= List of computer hardware manufacturers =

Current notable computer hardware manufacturers:

== Cases ==
List of computer case manufacturers:

- Aigo
- Antec
- AOpen
- ASRock
- Asus
- be quiet!
- CaseLabs (defunct)
- Chassis Plans
- Cooler Master
- Corsair
- Deepcool
- DFI
- ECS
- EVGA Corporation
- Foxconn
- Fractal Design
- Gigabyte Technology
- IBall
- In Win Development
- Lian Li
- MSI
- MiTAC
- NZXT
- Phanteks
- Razer
- Rosewill
- Seasonic
- Shuttle
- Thermaltake
- XFX
- XPG (Xtreme Performance Gear, a gaming brand of ADATA)
- Nvidia

=== Rack-mount computer cases ===
- Antec
- AOpen

== Laptop computer cases ==
- Clevo
- MSI
- XPG (Xtreme Performance Gear, a gaming brand of ADATA)

== Motherboards ==
Top motherboard manufacturers:

- ASRock
- Asus
- Biostar
- EVGA Corporation
- Gigabyte Technology
- MSI (Micro-Star International)
- Intel

List of motherboard manufacturers:

- Acer
- ACube Systems
- Albatron
- AOpen
- Chassis Plans
- DFI (industrial motherboards), stopped producing LanParty motherboards in 2009
- ECS (Elitegroup Computer Systems)
- EPoX (partially defunct)
- First International Computer
- Foxconn
- Fujitsu
- Gumstix
- Intel (NUC and server motherboards)
- Lanner Inc (industrial motherboards)
- Leadtek
- Lite-On
- NZXT
- Pegatron
- PNY Technologies
- Powercolor
- Sapphire Technology
- Shuttle Inc.
- Simmtronics
- Supermicro
- Tyan
- VIA Technologies
- Vigor Gaming
- ZOTAC

Defunct:

- BFG Technologies
- Chaintech
- Soyo Group Inc
- Universal Abit (formerly ABIT)

== Chipsets for motherboards ==
- AMD
- Redpine Signals
- Intel
- Nvidia
- ServerWorks
- Silicon Integrated Systems
- VIA Technologies

== Central processing units (CPUs) ==
Note: most of these companies only make designs, and do not manufacture their own designs.

Top x86 CPU manufacturers:

- AMD
- Intel

List of CPU manufacturers (most of the companies sell ARM-based CPUs, assumed if nothing else stated):

- Arm Ltd. (sells designs and the AGI CPU)
- Amazon (AWS Graviton is ARM-based)
- Apple Inc. (ARM-based CPUs)
- Broadcom Inc. (ARM-based, e.g. for Raspberry Pi)
- Google (ARM-based Axion and Tensor)
- Fujitsu (its ARM-based CPU used in top supercomputer, still also sells its SPARC-based servers)
- Hitachi (its own designs and ARM)
- Hygon Information Technology (x86-based)
- Loongson (MIPS-based)
- HiSilicon (acquired by Huawei), stopped making its ARM-based design
- IBM (now only designs two architectures)
- Ingenic Semiconductor (MIPS-based)
- Marvell (its ThunderX3 ARM-based)
- MCST (its own designs and SPARC)
- MediaTek (ARM chips, and MIPS chips)
- Microsoft (Arm-based Azure Cobalt CPU)
- Nvidia (sells ARM-based, and unsuccessfully attempted to buy the ARM company)
- Qualcomm (ARM-based)
- Rockchip (ARM-based)
- Amlogic (ARM-based)
- Allwinner (ARM-based)
- Samsung (ARM-based)
- SiFive (RISC-V-based, e.g. HiFive Unleashed)
- Texas Instruments (its own designs and ARM)
- Via (formerly Centaur Technology division), its own x86-based design
- Wave Computing (previously MIPS Technologies), licenses MIPS CPU design
- Zhaoxin (its own x86 design based on Via's)

== Hard disk drives (HDDs) ==
=== Internal ===
List of current hard disk drive manufacturers:

- Seagate Technology
- Toshiba
- Western Digital

=== External ===
Note: the HDDs internal to these devices are manufactured only by the internal HDD manufacturers listed above.

List of external hard disk drive manufacturers:

- ADATA
- Buffalo Technology
- Freecom
- G-Technology (brand of Western Digital)
- Hyundai
- IoSafe-Hard drive safes
- LaCie (brand of Seagate)
- LG
- Maxtor (brand of Seagate)
- Samsung
- Seagate Technology
- Silicon Power
- Sony
- Toshiba
- Transcend Information
- TrekStor
- Verbatim Corporation
- Western Digital

== Drive controller and RAID cards ==
- 3ware
- Adaptec
- Asus
- Areca Technology
- ATTO Technology
- Dell
- Hewlett Packard Enterprise
- Intel
- LG
- LSI
- PNY
- StarTech.com

== Solid-state drives (SSDs) ==
Many companies manufacture SSDs but there are only a few major manufactures of NAND flash devices that are the storage element in most SSDs. The five major NAND flash manufacturers are:

- Samsung
- SK Group
- Sandisk and Kioxia thru Flash Forward
- Micron
- YMTC
- Kingston Technology

== Optical disc drives (ODDs) ==
List of optical disc drive manufacturers:

- Asus
- Hitachi-LG Data Storage (HLDS)
- LG Electronics
- Panasonic
- Philips & Lite-on Digital Solutions Corporation
- Optiarc
- Pioneer
- Sony Corporation
- TEAC
- Toshiba Samsung Storage Technology

== Fans ==
- Aigo
- Antec
- Asus
- Arctic GmbH
- be quiet!
- Corsair
- Cooler Master
- Deepcool
- Delta Electronics
- Ebm-papst
- Inventec
- Lian Li
- Minebea (NMB)
- MSI
- Nidec
- Noctua
- NZXT
- Razer Inc. (also bundled with AIO watercoolers)
- Thermaltake
- Thermalright
- XPG (Xtreme Performance Gear, a gaming brand of ADATA)

== Fan controllers ==
- Asus (bundled with top of the range ROG motherboards)
- Cooler Master
- Corsair
- GELID Solutions
- Lian Li
- NZXT
- Razer Inc. (external or internal)
- Thermaltake

== Computer cooling systems ==
List of computer cooling system manufacturers:

- Aigo
- AMD
- Antec
- Arctic GmbH
- Asetek
- Asus
- be quiet!
- Cooler Master
- Corsair
- Deepcool
- ebm-papst
- Fractal Design
- Foxconn
- GELID Solutions
- Gigabyte Technology
- Hama Photo
- Intel
- Nidec
- Noctua
- NZXT
- MSI
- Saint-Gobain (tubing system)
- Thermalright
- Thermaltake
- Vigor Gaming
- XPG (Xtreme Performance Gear, a gaming brand of ADATA)

=== Non-refillable liquid cooling (AiO) ===
List of non-refillable liquid cooling manufacturers:

- Arctic GmbH "Liquid Freezer Series "
- Asus
- Cooler Master "Seidon Series"
- Corsair "H-Series"
- Deepcool "CAPTAIN Series" "MAELSTROM Series"
- EKWB
- EVGA Corporation
- Fractal Design "Kelvin Series"
- Lian Li
- NZXT "Kraken Series"
- Razer Inc. "Hanbo Chroma Series"
- Thermaltake "Water2.0 Series"
- XPG "Lavente series" (Xtreme Performance Gear, a gaming brand of ADATA)
- Zotac (stopped producing water coolers)

=== Refillable liquid cooling kits ===
List of refillable liquid cooling kits manufacturers:

- Thermaltake

=== Water block ===
List of water block manufacturers:

- Corsair
- EKWB
- EVGA Corporation
- Thermaltake

=== Video-card cooling ===
List of graphics card cooling manufacturers:

- Arctic GmbH
- Cooler Master
- Corsair
- Deepcool "v series"
- EVGA Corporation
- GELID Solutions
- Zotac

== Computer monitors ==
List of companies that are actively manufacturing and selling computer monitors:

- Alienware
- Apple
- Acer
- AOC Monitors
- Asus
- AOpen
- BenQ
- Chassis Plans
- Cooler Master
- Dell
- Eizo
- Fujitsu
- Hewlett-Packard
- Iiyama (company)
- Gateway
- HannStar
- Lenovo
- LG
- MSI
- NEC
- Philips
- Planar Systems
- Razer Inc.
- Samsung
- Sharp
- Sony
- Tatung Company
- ViewSonic

== Smartglasses ==
- Epson
- Everysight
- Google
- Magic Leap
- Meta Platforms
- Microsoft
- Snap Inc.
- Vuzix

== Virtual reality headsets ==
- Apple Inc
- ByteDance
- HTC
- Microsoft
- Pimax
- Razer Inc.
- Reality Labs
- Samsung Electronics
- Sony Interactive Entertainment
- Valve Corporation

== Video cards (graphics cards) ==
List of video card manufacturers:

- Acer: Arc, Radeon
- Asrock: Arc, Radeon
- Asus: GeForce, Radeon
- AMD: Radeon (reference)
- Biostar: Radeon, GeForce
- Chaintech: GeForce
- Colorful: GeForce
- ECS
- ELSA Technology
- Foxconn
- Gainward: GeForce
- Galaxy Microsystems: GeForce
- Gigabyte Technology: GeForce, Radeon
- HIS: Radeon
- Intel: Arc (reference)
- Leadtek: GeForce
- Matrox: Arc
- Maxsun: GeForce
- Moore Threads: MTT (reference)
- Nvidia: GeForce (reference)
- MSI: Radeon, GeForce
- Palit Microsystems: GeForce
- PNY: GeForce
- Point of View
- PowerColor: Radeon
- Sapphire Technology: Radeon
- SPARKLE: Arc
- XFX: Radeon, GeForce
- Zotac: GeForce

== Graphics processing units (GPUs) ==
- Advanced Micro Devices
- ARM Holdings (Mali GPUs, first designed by acquired Falanx)
- Broadcom
- Imagination Technologies (PowerVR)
- Intel
- Jingjia Micro
- Moore Threads
- NeoMagic
- Nvidia
- Qualcomm
- Samsung Electronics

== Keyboards ==
List of keyboard manufacturers:

- A4Tech
- Alps
- Amkette
- Arctic GmbH
- Behavior Tech Computer (BTC)
- Chassis Plans
- Cherry
- Chicony Electronics
- Corsair
- Cooler Master
- CTI Electronics Corporation
- Das Keyboard
- Drop (company)
- Fujitsu–Siemens
- Gigabyte Technology
- G.Skill
- Hama Photo
- Happy Hacking Keyboard
- HyperX
- IBall
- intex
- Kensington Computer Products Group
- Key Tronic
- Lite-On
- Logitech
- Microsoft
- Razer
- Saitek
- Samsung
- SteelSeries
- Targus
- Thermaltake
- Trust
- Umax
- Unicomp
- Wooting
- XPG (Xtreme Performance Gear, a gaming brand of ADATA)

== Mouse ==
List of mouse manufacturers:

- A4Tech
- Acer
- Alienware
- Arctic GmbH
- Asus
- Behavior Tech Computer (BTC)
- Belkin
- Cooler Master
- Corsair
- Creative Technology
- CTI Electronics Corporation
- Fellowes, Inc.
- Flextronics
- General Electric
- Gigabyte Technology
- Hama Photo
- IBall
- intex
- TVS Electronics
- Kensington Computer Products Group
- Key Tronic
- Labtec
- Lite-On
- Logitech
- Mad Catz
- Microsoft
- Mitsumi
- OCZ Technology
- Razer
- Saitek
- Samsung
- Sony
- SteelSeries
- Targus
- Toshiba
- Trust
- Umax
- Verbatim Corporation
- XPG (Xtreme Performance Gear, a gaming brand of ADATA)

== Joysticks ==
List of Joystick manufacturers:

- Saitek
- Logitech
- CTI Electronics Corporation
- Microsoft
- Thrustmaster
- Sony

== Speakers ==
List of computer speaker manufacturers:

- Altec Lansing
- AOpen (stopped making speakers)
- Auzentech
- Behringer
- Bose Corporation
- Cemex
- Cerwin-Vega
- Corsair
- Creative Technology
- Edifier
- General Electric
- Gigabyte Technology
- Hama Photo
- Harman International Industries (acquisition)

(division: Harman Kardon, JBL)

- Hercules
- IBall
- Intex
- Klipsch
- Logic
- Logitech
- M-Audio
- MartinLogan
- Microlab
- Philips
- Plantronics (acquisitions)
- Razer
- Shuttle Inc.
- Sonodyne
- Sony
- SteelSeries
- Teufel Audio
- Trust
- Yamaha

== Modems ==
List of modem manufacturers:

- 3Com
- Agere Systems
- Alcatel
- Aopen
- Arris Group
- Asus
- AVM GmbH
- Belkin International, Inc.
- Coolpad
- D-Link
- Cisco
- Huawei
- JCG
- Linksys
- Microcom
- Motorola
- Netgear
- Netopia
- Telebit
- TP-Link
- USRobotics
- Zhone Technologies
- Zoom Telephonics
- ZyXEL

== Network interface cards (NICs) ==
List of network card manufacturers:

- 3Com
- Asus
- Atheros
- Belkin
- Chelsio Communications
- Cisco
- CNet
- D-Link
- Gigabyte Technology
- Hewlett Packard Enterprise
- IBM
- Intel
- JCG
- Linksys
- Ralink
- Mellanox
- Netgear
- Raza Microelectronics
- Solarflare
- StarTech.com
- TP-Link
- USRobotics
- Zoom

== Chipsets for network cards ==
- ASIX
- Atheros
- Aquantia
- Broadcom
- Emulex
- Fujitsu
- Hewlett Packard Enterprise
- Intel
- LSI Corporation
- Nvidia
- Marvell Technology Group
- Mellanox
- Proxim
- Qlogic
- Qualcomm
- Ralink
- Realtek
- Solarflare
- VIA Technologies
- Winbond

There are a number of other companies (AMD, Microchip, Altera, etc.) making specialized chipsets as part of other ICs, and they are not often found in PC hardware (laptop, desktop or server). There are also a number of now defunct companies (like 3com, DEC, SGI) that produced network related chipsets for us in general computers.

== Power supply units (PSUs) ==
List of power supply unit (PSU) designers:

- XPG (Xtreme Performance Gear, a gaming brand of ADATA)
- Antec
- Arctic GmbH
- ASRock
- ASUS
- be quiet!
- Cooler Master
- Corsair
- Deepcool
- Delta Electronics
- Dynex
- EVGA Corporation
- Fractal Design
- Foxconn
- FSP Group
- Gigabyte Technology
- Lian-Li
- Lite-On
- Maplin
- NZXT
- OCZ Technology
- PC Power and Cooling
- Razer Inc.
- Rosewill
- Seasonic
- Seventeam
- StarTech.com
- Super Flower
- Thermaltake
- Trust
- XFX
- Xilence

== Random-access memory (RAM) modules ==
Note that the actual memory chips are manufactured by a small number of DRAM manufacturers. List of memory module manufacturers:

- ADATA
- Apacer
- Asus
- Buffalo Technology
- Chaintech
- Corsair
- Dataram
- Fujitsu
- G.Skill
- GeIL
- HyperX
- IBM
- Infineon
- Kingston Technology
- Lenovo
- Crucial (Micron decided to exit the Crucial consumer business in December 2025 and continue with Micron-branded memory modules)
- Mushkin
- Netlist
- PNY
- Rambus
- Ramtron International
- Rendition
- Renesas Technology
- Samsung Semiconductor
- Sandisk
- Sea Sonic
- SK Hynix
- Silicon Power
- Toshiba
- Transcend
- Virtium
- Wilk Elektronik
- Winbond

== Random-access memory (RAM) chips ==
List of current DRAM manufacturers:

- Micron Technology
- Samsung Semiconductor
- SK hynix
- ChangXin Memory Technologies
- Nanya Technology
- Powerchip Semiconductor (as a foundry)
- Winbond (specialty and mobile DRAM)

List of former or defunct DRAM manufacturers:

- NEC, Hitachi, later Elpida Memory (went bankrupt, bought by Micron)
- Mitsubishi, later Elpida
- Siemens, spun off Infineon Technologies, spun off Qimonda (went bankrupt, IP bought by Micron and others)
- Inotera, bought by Micron
- Intel (Intel 1103)
- Mostek
- Mosel Vitelic Inc (ProMOS Technologies spun off from Mosel Vitelic)
- Toshiba (DRAM business sold to Micron)
- Texas Instruments (sold to Micron)

List of fabless DRAM companies:

- Rambus

In addition, other semiconductor manufacturers include SRAM or eDRAM embedded in larger chips.

== Headphones ==
List of headphone manufacturers:

- AKG Acoustics
- Altec Lansing
- Amkette
- Asus
- Audio-Technica
- Beats Electronics
- Beyerdynamic
- Biostar
- Bose Corporation
- Bush (brand)
- Corsair
- Creative Technology
- Edifier
- Fostex
- Grado Labs
- Hercules
- HiFiMan
- IHome
- JBL
- JLab Audio
- JVC (brand of JVCKenwood)
- Klipsch Audio Technologies
- Koss Corporation
- Meze Headphones
- Microsoft
- Monster Cable
- Panasonic
- Philips
- Plantronics
- Plantronics Gamecom
- Razer
- Roccat
- Samsung
- Sennheiser
- Shure
- Skullcandy
- SMS Audio
- Sonodyne
- Sony
- Stax Earspeakers
- SteelSeries
- Thermaltake
- Technics (brand)
- Thinksound
- Thrustmaster
- Turtle Beach Systems
- Ultrasone
- V-Moda
- XPG (Xtreme Performance Gear, a gaming brand of ADATA)
- Yamaha

== Image scanners ==
List of image scanner manufacturers:

- Brother
- Canon
- Fujitsu
- Kodak
- Lexmark
- Microtek
- Panasonic
- Plustek
- Ricoh
- Seiko Epson
- Umax
- Visioneer
- XEROX

== Sound cards ==
List of sound card manufacturers:

- Gravis
- Analog Devices
- Asus
- Aureal Semiconductor
- Auzentech
- C-Media
- Conrad
- Creative Technology
- Diamond Multimedia
- Avid Audio
- E-MU Systems
- Ensoniq
- ESS Technology
- Focusrite
- Hercules
- HT Omega
- Korg
- Lexicon
- M-Audio
- MOTU
- PreSonus
- Razer
- Realtek
- Roland
- StarTech.com
- Silicon Integrated Systems
- TerraTec
- Turtle Beach
- VIA Technologies
- Yamaha

== TV tuner cards ==
List of TV tuner card manufacturers:

- AVerMedia
- Asus
- Diamond Multimedia
- EVGA Corporation
- EyeTV
- Gigabyte Technology
- Hauppauge Computer Works
- KWorld
- Leadtek
- Micro-Star International
- Pinnacle Systems
- Plextor
- Powercolor
- TerraTec
- Umax

== USB flash drives ==
List of USB flash drive manufacturers:

- ADATA
- Aigo
- Apacer
- ATP Electronics
- Corsair
- Crucial Technology
- Imation
- IronKey
- Kingston Technology
- Konami
- Lexar
- Maxell
- Netac
- OCZ
- PNY
- Quantum Corporation
- Ritek
- Samsung
- Sandisk
- Seagate
- Silicon Power
- Sony
- Strontium Technology
- Toshiba
- Transcend
- TrekStor
- Umax
- Verbatim
- VisiOn
- Wilk Elektronik

== Webcams ==
List of webcam manufacturers:

- A4Tech
- Behavior Tech Computer
- Canon
- Creative Technology
- D-Link
- FaceVsion
- General Electric
- Hama Photo
- Hewlett-Packard
- Intel
- Labtec
- Lenovo
- Logitech
- Kodak
- Microsoft
- Philips
- Razer Inc.
- Samsung
- Silicon Power
- Trust
- TP-Link

== See also ==
- List of computer system manufacturers
- List of laptop brands and manufacturers
- List of flash memory controller manufacturers
- List of printer companies
- List of semiconductor companies by country
- List of solid-state drive manufacturers
- Market share of personal computer vendors
- List of computer hardware manufacturers in the Soviet Union
