= Thermalright =

Taiwan-based electronics company

- Industry: Computer hardware industry
- Founded: 2001; 25 years ago
- Headquarters: Taiwan
- Products: Computer cooling
- Website: www.thermalright.com

Thermalright Inc. is a Taiwan-based electronics company headquartered in Taipei. It was established in 2001. The company produces cooling products like heat sinks and other components for cooling desktop computers.

== Types of products ==
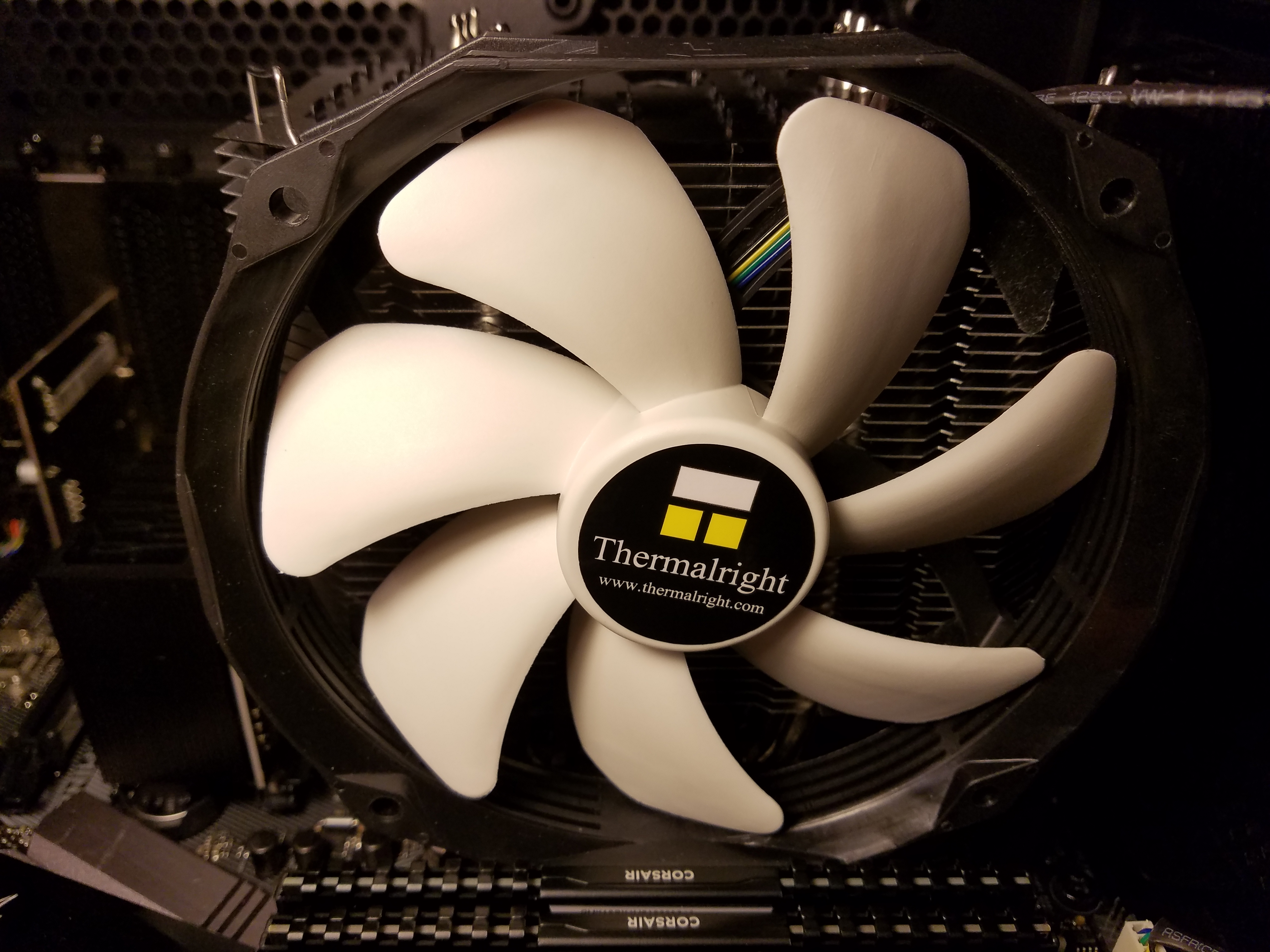
Thermalright Le Grand Macho RT

CPU fan Thermalright Le Grand Macho RT functioning

Thermalright Inc. produces cooling components for desktop computers, such as various heat sink, CPU coolers, and other accessories. Since 2022, they have also been producing computer power supplies.

== See also ==
Similar companies

- Arctic GmbH (Arctic Cooling)
- Cooler Master
- Deepcool
- Noctua
