= LTSports =

Taiwanese online media

LTSports or Leadteksports (Chinese: 麗台運動報), founded by Leadtek, is a Taiwanese online media and provides the latest local and international sport news.
