= Be Quiet =

Be quiet is an immediate command to stop speaking, or making noise.

Be quiet may also refer to:

- be quiet!, a German computer hardware brand
- Be Quiet, a song by Pitbull
- Bee Quiet, an episode from the animated cartoon Stoppit and Tidyup
