= Targus =

Targus may refer to:

- Anastasia Targus, a character in the video game Star Trek: Borg
- Targus (corporation), a company that makes computer accessories
- Targus, a planet in the role-playing game Star Hero RPG world

== See also ==
- Târgu Mureș, a Romanian city
- Târgu Jiu, a Romanian city
