= Noctua =

Noctua may refer to:

- Noctua (company), a computer hardware company
- Noctua (constellation), an archaic constellation
- Noctua (moth), a genus of moths
