= Silicone rubber keypad =

Silicone rubber keypads (also known as elastomeric keypads) are used extensively in both consumer and industrial electronic products as a low cost and reliable switching solution.

== Technology ==
Silicone Key web design

The technology uses the compression molding properties of silicone rubber to create angled webbing around a switch center. On depression of the switch, the webbing uniformly deforms to produce a tactile response. When pressure is removed from the switch, the webbing returns to its neutral position with positive feedback.

To make an electronic switch, a carbon or gold pill is placed on the base of the switch center which contacts onto a printed circuit board when the web has been deformed. Alternately, instead of using a conductive pill, the switch itself can be made of a conductive elastomer such as rubber with a mixture of carbon.

It is possible to vary the tactile response and travel of a key by changing the webbing design and/or the shore hardness of the silicone base material. Unusual key shapes can easily be accommodated as can key travel up to three millimeters. Tactile forces can be as high as 500 g depending on key size and shape.

The snap ratio of a keypad determines the tactile feel experienced by the user. The recommended snap ratio for designers to maintain is 40%-60%; if dropped below 40% the keys will lose tactile feel but have an increased life. Loss of tactile feel means the user will not receive a ‘click’ feedback during actuation.

Snap ratio is calculated as the difference between the actuation force and the contact force of a switch divided by the actuation force. The actuation force is the force required to collapse the membrane of a rubber switch, and the contact force is the force required to maintain rubber-switch contact closure with a printed circuit board.

Mathematically, this can be represented by:

Snap ratio = (F1 - F2) / F1

where F1 is the actuation force, and F2 is the contact force.

By adding pigments to the natural silicone rubber, it is possible to create keys in various colors which can be molded together (Flowing colors) during the compression process to form a multi key keypad. Individual legends can be printed on to a key allowing full customization of the keypad for its application. Techniques have also been developed to allow for keypads to be spray painted and legends then laser etched through the paint coating. This allows individual key to be illuminated using SMT LEDs placed on the printed circuit board. Also several coating materials such as Sealplast coating can be done to ensure a smooth surface where the printed legend last longer with good feeling of touch.

Laser etching is the laser controlled process of removing the top coat layer of a painted keypad (usually black in color) to reveal lighter colored layer below (usually white). The effect is to produce an enhanced backlight effect by only lighting the legends on a keypad. By combining laser etching with either electroluminescence (EL) or LED backlighting in a range of color options it is possible to produce an interesting range of effects.

Also the contact resistance can be customized based on electronics need where contact pills can be of different resistance. A general carbon pill can be of around 20 to 100 ohms, a low resistance contact pill can be up to 10 ohms. Gold or Supra-Conductive pills can be used to obtain a resistivity as low as 1 ohm.

== Properties ==
Because silicone is an insulator, silicone rubber keypads are naturally shock resistant. Silicone rubber keypads are also naturally vibration resistant, and they can be customized to be water and dust resistant as well. For this reason, rubber keypads are often suitable for rugged applications. Rubber keypads can also be easily backlit, as silicone rubber acts as an efficient light diffusion medium.

== Applications ==
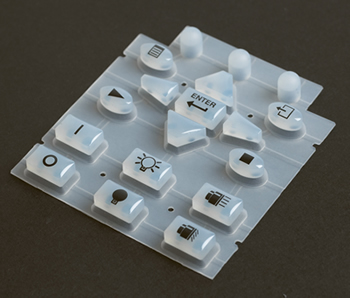
Keypad with translucent rubber

Common applications of silicone rubber keypads include remote controls for TV, video and HIFI units, electronic toys and games, and industrial control equipment.

Industrial silicone rubber keypads such as ones produced by CTI Electronics Corporation are used in the medical, marine, or military fields and are typically sealed to comply with specific industry standards such as NEMA or IP66 for protection against elements such as liquids or dust.

Prior to eliminating keypads in favor of touchscreens, mobile phone handset manufacturers were the main consumer of rubber keypads worldwide. Their involvement has led to advances in technology including the use of hard plastic key tops bonded to a rubber keypad and also the use of embossed Mylar layer to produce an enhanced tactile response.

With the increased use of low-current switching in automobiles, silicone-rubber keypads are being used extensively as switch mechanisms for various buttons such as window lifts and steering wheel mounted controls. Low-resistance pills such as SC pills and gold pills, along with short-stroke metal-dome contacts, are widely used in these settings.

== See also ==
- Elastomeric connector
- Elastomer
- Membrane switch
