= Fractal Design =

Swedish computer hardware manufacturer

Fractal Gaming Group AB
- Company type: Public
- Traded as: First North: FRACTL
- ISIN: SE0015504477
- Industry: Computer hardware
- Founded: 2007; 19 years ago
- Founder: Hannes Wallin
- Headquarters: Gothenburg, Sweden
- Products: Computer cases, power supplies
- Number of employees: 80
- Website: www.fractal-design.com

Old logo of Fractal Design, used until August 2019

Fractal Design is a Swedish computer hardware manufacturer. Founded in 2007, the company manufactures computer cases, water coolers, case fans, and power supplies.

In recent years the company's products have won several awards in computer hardware industry such as the Case Manufacturer of the Year (2013–2015), European Hardware Awards (2015) and Brand of the year IXBT.com (2015), Russia.

Their products are designed and engineered in the company's headquarters in Gothenburg, Sweden, and manufactured in China. As Fractal Design is operating internationally, the company also has offices in Europe, North America and Asia.

== History ==
Fractal Design was founded in Gothenburg, Sweden, in 2007. In 2009, international recognition for the company grew after the first computer case within the Define series was introduced. In the same year, the company opened a North American office in Dallas, Texas. A few months later, an Asia office was established to handle increased Product Development and Sales.

By the end of 2016, the company continued to develop the concepts of Scandinavian design, silent computing and support of powerful computer configurations by launching new computer cases under the Define series. As of 2020, Fractal products are available in more than 50 countries.

== See also ==
- List of computer hardware manufacturers
