= Thermaltake =

Taiwanese PC component manufacturer

Thermaltake Technology Co., Ltd.
- Logo since 2017
- Native name: 曜越科技
- Company type: Public
- Traded as: TPEx: 3540
- Industry: Computer hardware
- Founded: 1999; 27 years ago
- Headquarters: Neihu District, New Taipei City, Taiwan
- Key people: Kenny Lin (CEO)
- Products: Computer cases; Computer cooling; Power supplies; Computer storage; Computer keyboards; Computer mice; Computer memory; Liquid cooling Kits; Mobile audio products; PC accessories; Notebook accessories
- Number of employees: 500 (June 2010)
- Website: www.thermaltake.com

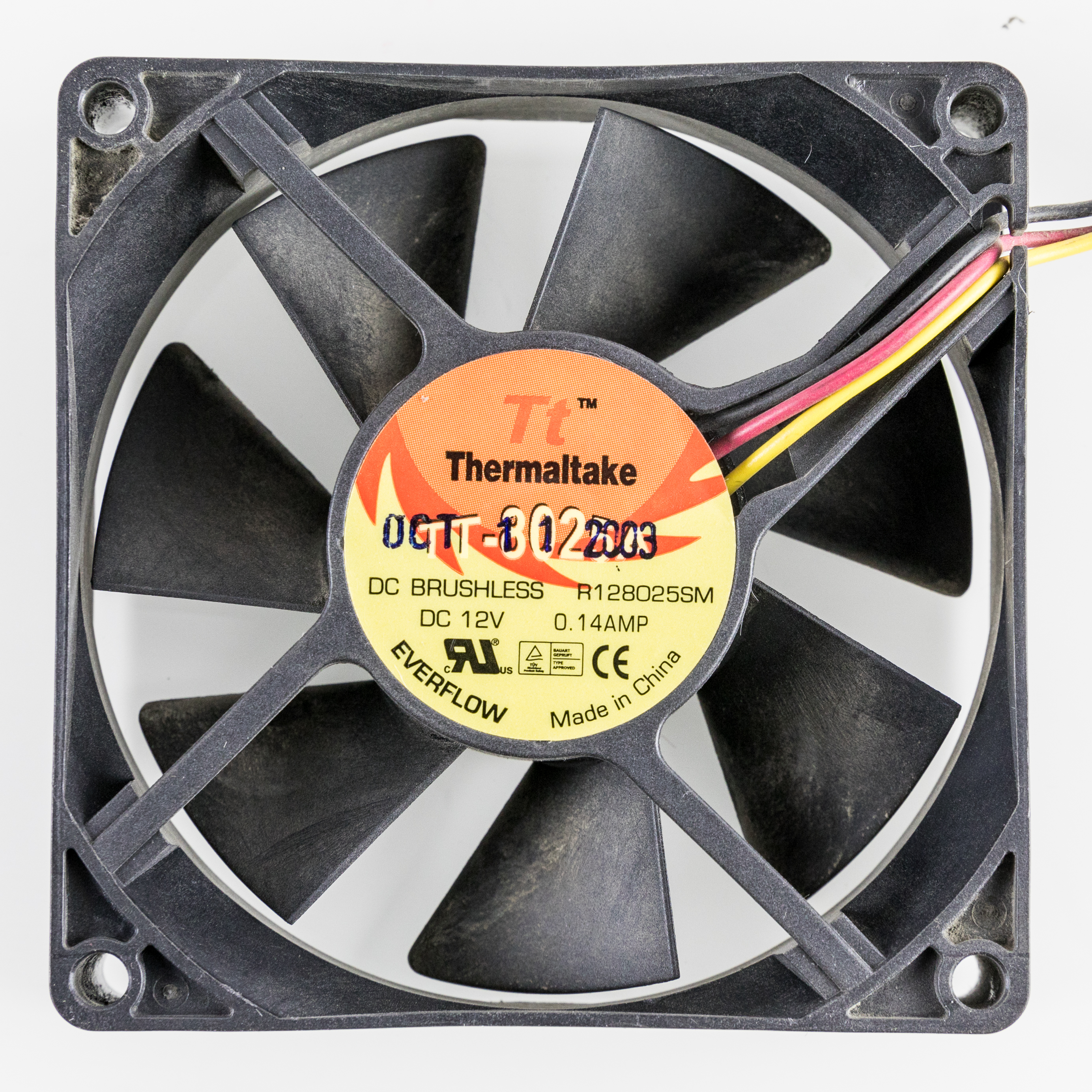
Thermaltake cooling fan

Thermaltake Technology Co., Ltd. (Chinese: 曜越科技; pinyin: Yàoyuè Kējì; To Exceed Radiant Technology) is a Taiwanese manufacturer of PC case designs, power supplies, cooling devices and other peripherals. Its main headquarters are located in Taipei, Taiwan. It has multiple manufacturing facilities in mainland China, including a major plant at Dongguan, and as of September 30, 2024 had a trailing twelve-month revenue of $125M. In 2021 Forbes listed Thermaltake on its annual Asia's 200 Best Under A Billion; more recently the company has increased its presence in the computer gaming market.

== History ==
Thermaltake was founded in Taiwan in 1999. Its American headquarters were established at the same time with offices in Southern California.

=== Copying controversy ===
At Computex 2015, Thermaltake introduced two new computer cases that were very similar to CaseLabs' SM8 and TH10 cases with the pedestal accessory.

== Brands ==
=== Tt eSPORTS ===
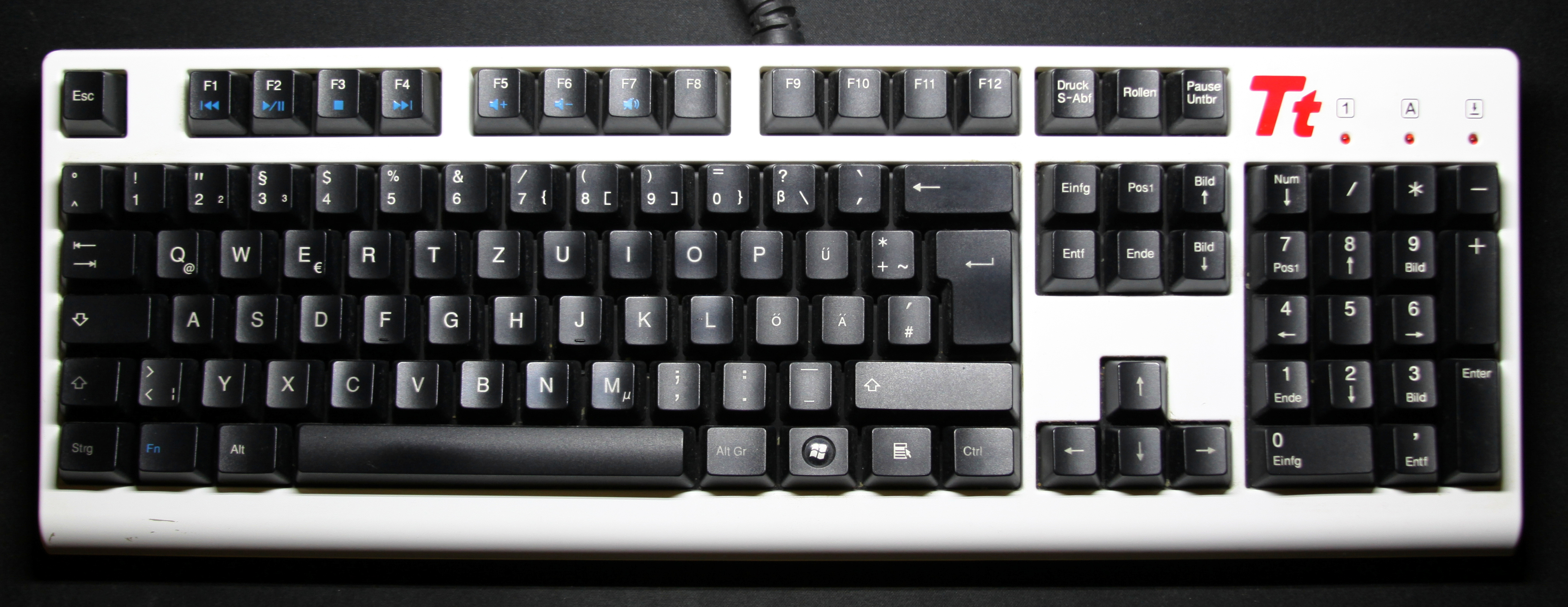
Tt eSports Meka G1 gaming keyboard with Cherry MX Black switches

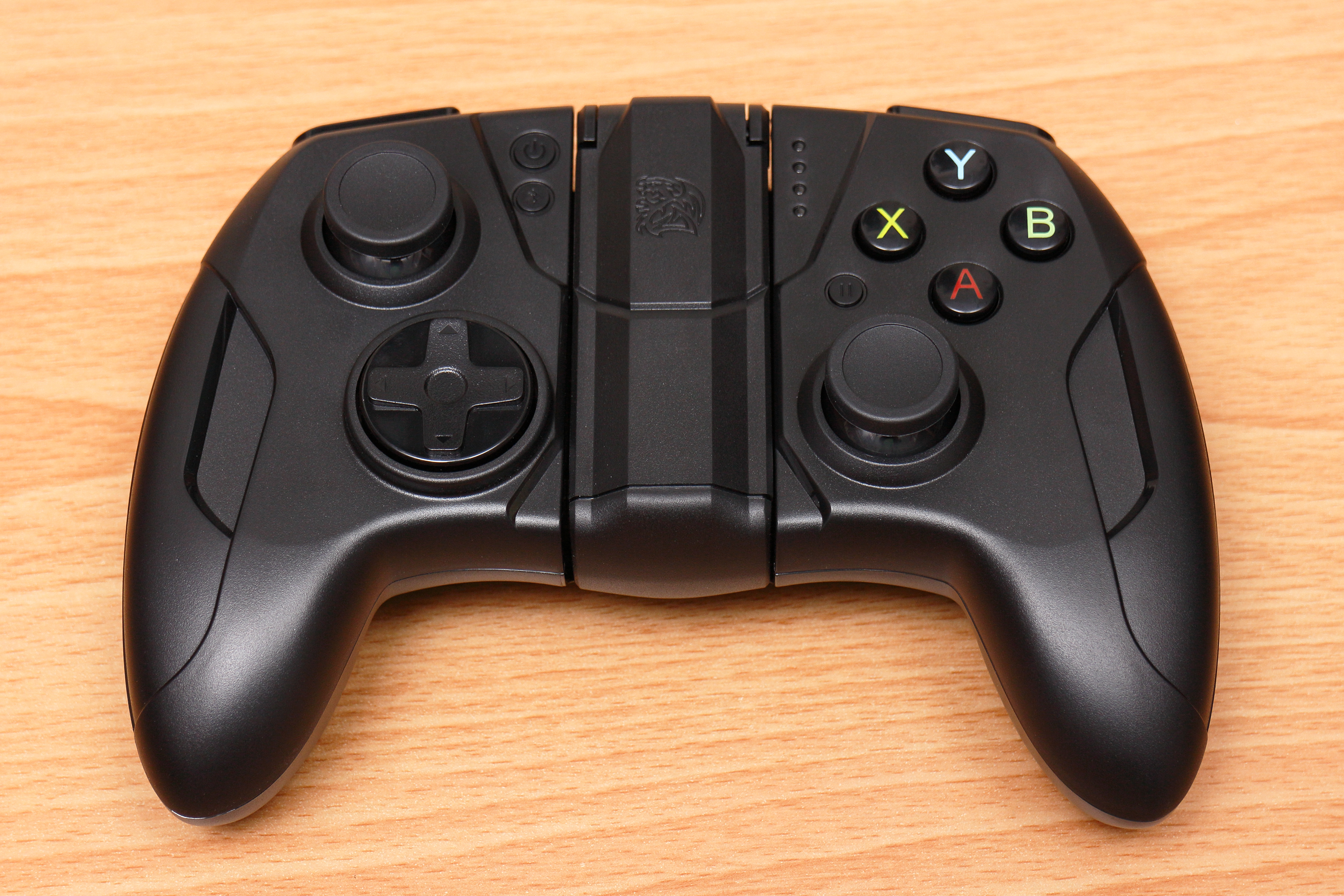
Tt eSports Contour gamepad

Thermaltake delivers a series of gaming mice, computer keyboards and other peripherals targeted towards competitive gamers through the Tt eSports brand. Tt eSPORTS also sponsors a variety of eSports teams and streamers across the world.

=== LUXA2 ===
In 2009, Thermaltake launched a mobile accessory brand called LUXA2.
