= Chassis Plans =

US military and industrial computer systems manufacturer

CP (North America) Inc.
- Trade name: Chassis Plans
- Industry: Military and Industrial Computer Systems and LCD Displays
- Founded: October 20, 1997; 29 years ago
- Headquarters: San Diego, California, U.S.
- Area served: Worldwide
- Products: Rackmount Computers; Military Computers; Rugged Computers; Industrial PCs; Rackmount LCDs; Single Board Computer Systems with Passive and Active Backplanes; Motherboard Systems; Personal Supercomputers; Distributed Cloud Computing Systems
- Website: cpnorthamerica.com

CP (North America) Inc., doing business as Chassis Plans, is an American military and industrial computer systems manufacturer specializing in rackmount computers, military computers, rugged computers, industrial PCs, rackmount LCDs, single-board computer systems with passive and active backplanes and motherboard systems. Chassis Plans is a spin-off of Industrial Computer Source, but it also has a spin off of itself called Industrial Commonship.

== Products ==
Chassis Plans specializes in providing custom and semi-custom solutions, with an emphasis on systems tailored exactly to the application requirements. A wide variety of rackmount 1U thru 5U computer systems are offered as standard products as outgrowths of custom designs. A line of military grade LCD keyboard systems is also offered.

== History ==
- 1997: Established as a spin-off of Industrial Computer Source providing engineering services and computer system designs.
- 1998: Recognized by Internet Telephony Center Stage for the design of the 717-BP20 Rackmount Computer.
- 2001: Chassis Plans expands product offering from design services to complete turnkey computer systems.
- 2006: COTS Journal article "Rugged Displays Suit Up for Challenging Environments".
- 2011: Honored by 2nd selection in Inc 500/5000 list for 2011.
- 2012: Honored by 3rd selection in Inc 500/5000 list for 2012.
- 2013: Honored by 4th selection in Inc 500/5000 list for 2013. #39 of Top 100 Computer Hardware Companies.
- 2014: Funds 'Chassis Plans Leadership in Engineering Scholarship'.
- 2014: Intelligent Aerospace Magazine Article - "Enhancing displays used in unmanned aircraft systems ground control stations"
- 2014: COTS Journal Magazine article - "Ruggedized Servers Revamp Data-Centric Military Environments"
- 2014: Awards Leadership in Engineering Scholarship.
- 2014: Named for fifth time to Inc 500/5000 list.
- 2014: Secures trademarks for "Industrial Computer Source-Book" and "Military Computer Source-Book".
- 2015: Mil Embedded Systems magazine awards the TFX1-19 rackmount LCD an Editor's Choice Award

== See also ==
- List of computer hardware manufacturers
- List of computer system manufacturers
