= List of computer hardware manufacturers in the Soviet Union =

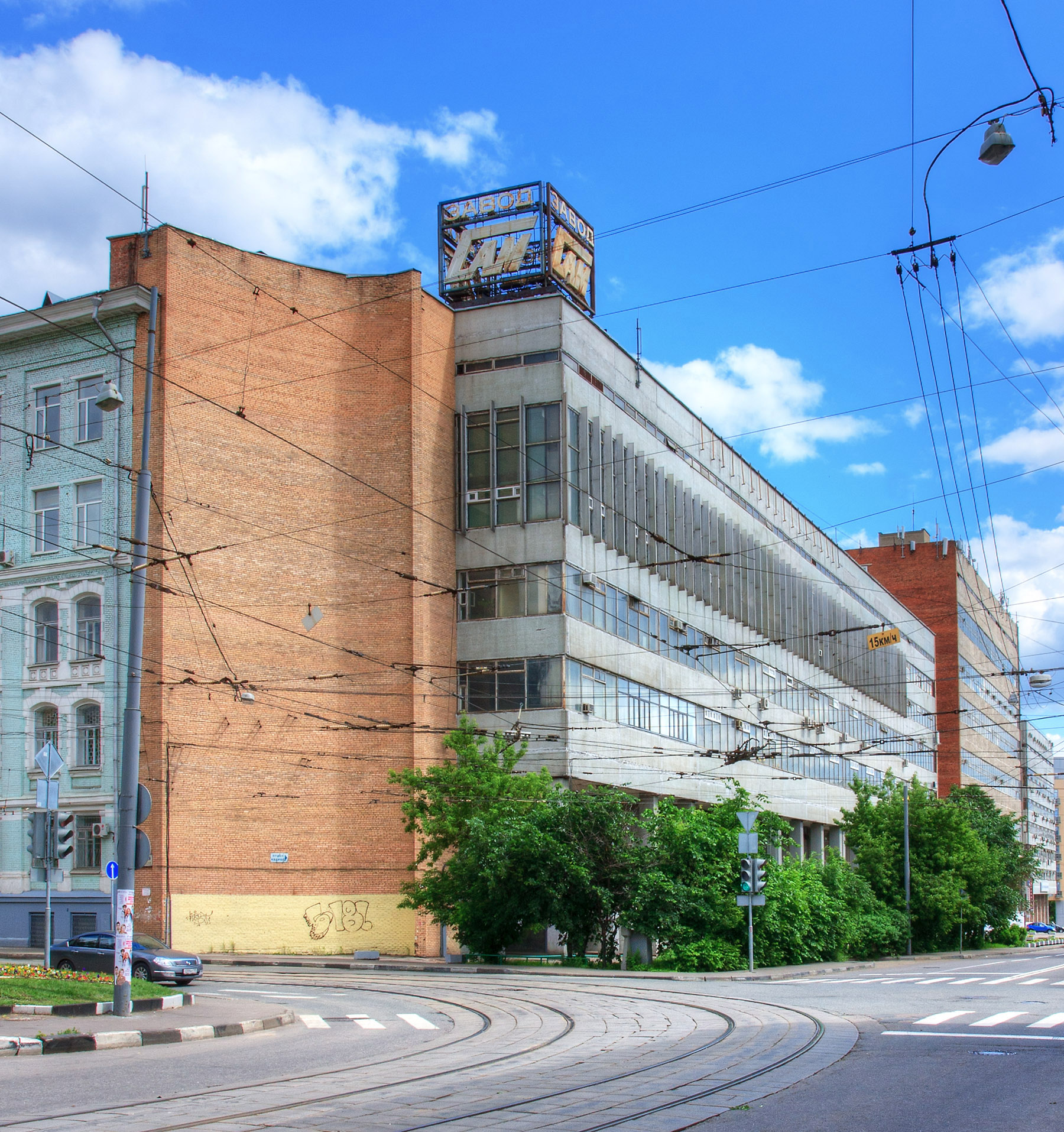
The Moscow Calculating Machines Plant in 2010

This is a list of computer hardware manufacturers in the Soviet Union:

== List ==
Major Soviet hardware manufacturers and ministry affiliations in 1988:

=== Ministry of the Electronics Industry ===
- Elka Plant
- Leningrad Svetlana Association
- Exiton Plant in Pavlovskiy Posad (завод «Экситон»)
- Voronezh Elektronika Association (НПО «Электроника»)
- Zelenograd Complex

=== Ministry of Instrument Making ===
- V. I. Lenin Kiev Elektronmash Production Association (Киевское производственное объединение «Электронмаш» им. В. И. Ленина)
- Kiev Plant of Computers and Electronic Control Machines (VUM) (Киевский завод вычислительных и управляющих машин - ВУМ)
- Kishinev Calculating Machine Plant
- Kursk Calculating Machines Plant
- Leningrad Electrical Machines Plant (Ленинградский Электромашиностроительный Завод)
- Livny Experimental Factory of Computer Graphics (Ливенский завод средств машинной графики)
- Moscow Elektronmash Scientific Production Association
- Orel Computer Machines Plant
- Ryazan Order of Lenin Factory of Calculating Analytical Machinery
- Impulse Severodonetsk Scientific Production Association (Северодонецкое научно-производственное объединение «Импульс»)
- Smolensk Calculating Machine Factory
- Taurage Calculating Machine Assemblies Plant (Tauragės skaičiavimo mašinų elementų gamykla)
- Tbilisi Control Computer Works
- Lenin Vilnius Computer Factory
- Vilnius Sigma Association
- Vinnytsia Terminal Plant (Завод «Терминал»)

=== Ministry of Radio Technology ===
- Kazan Computer Plant (Казанский завод ЭВМ)
- Minsk Computer Technology Production Corporation (Минское производственное объединение вычислительной техники)
- Moscow Calculating Machines Plant (SAM; Московский завод счётно-аналитических машин)
- Moscow Radio Plant (Московский Радиозавод)
- Penza Computer Work (Завод вычислительных электронных машин)
- Yerevan Electronics Plant (Ереванский завод "Электрон")

== See also ==
- List of computer hardware manufacturers
