= Xilence =

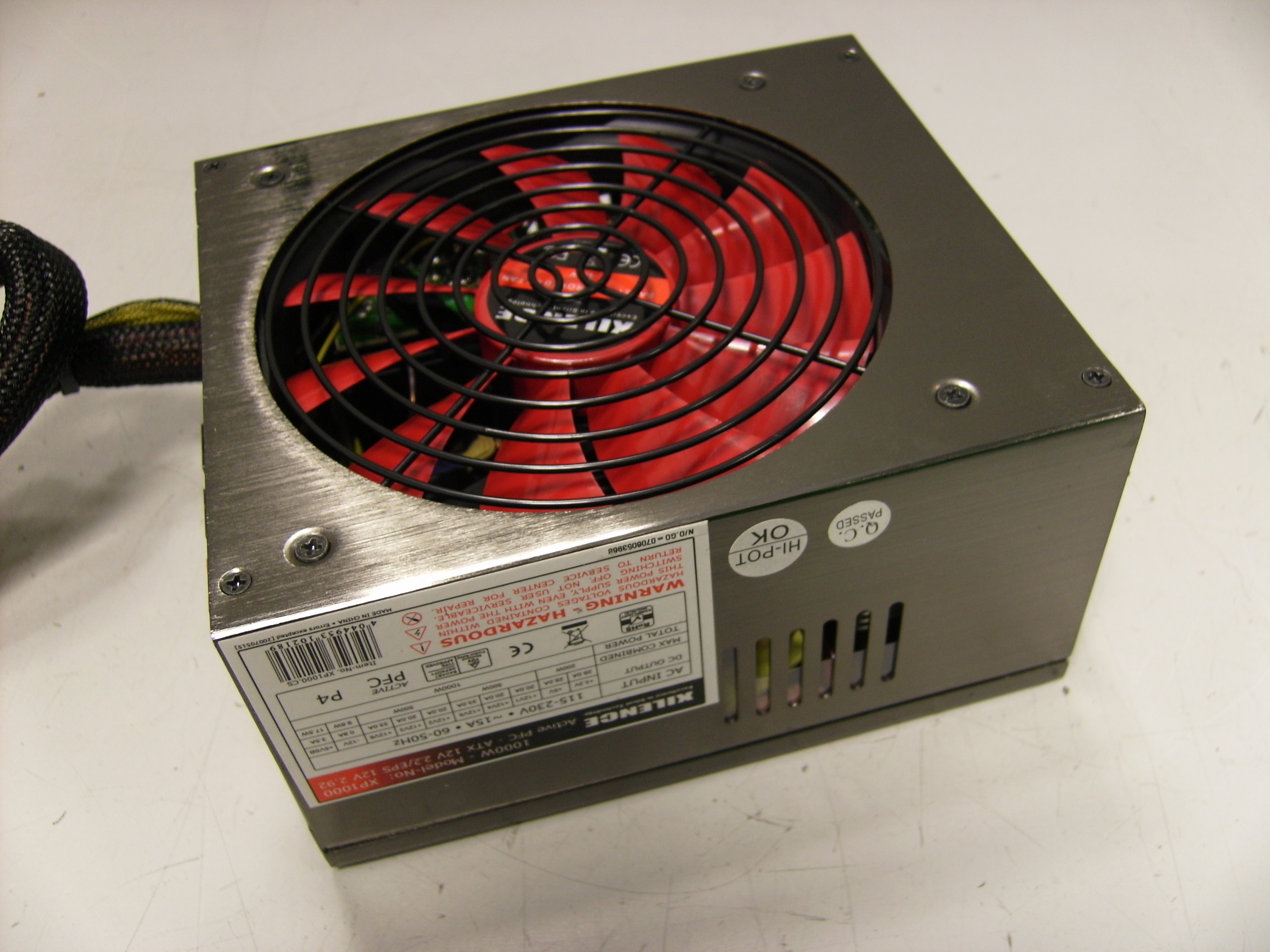
Xilence 1000W fan

Xilence was founded in 2003 and is a German-Taiwanese manufacturer of power supplies and components for cooling as well as noise reduction in PCs. Its products include power supplies (PSUs), fans, cases and cooling for CPUs, GPUs and hard drives.

The company has headquarters in Taipei, Taiwan, its production facility being in mainland China. There are branch offices located in China, Germany and North America.
