= GELID Solutions =

GELID Solutions Ltd.
- Type: Private
- Industry: Computer hardware, Thermal Solutions
- Founded: 2008; 18 years ago
- Headquarters: Ap Lei Chau, Hong Kong
- Products: Cooler
- Website: www.gelidsolutions.com

GELID Solutions Ltd. is a designer and manufacturer of CPU and VGA coolers, chassis fans, thermal compounds, accessories and other equipment for computers and electronic devices. The company is based in Hong Kong and has multiple manufacturing facilities in Mainland China and Taiwan.

== History ==
GELID Solutions was founded in 2008 by Gebhard Scherrer and VC Tran.

In 2009, GELID Solutions launched the GC-Extreme thermal compound which is fully compatible to extreme overclocking and subzero liquid nitrogen cooling. The GC-Extreme thermal compound is reportedly used by famous enthusiast overclockers, such as Matei Mihatoiu, Winner of MSI Master Overclocking Arena EMEA 2011, and Lau Kin Lam, Winner of G.Skill OC World Cup 2015.

In 2013, GELID Solutions manufactured the world's first cooling unit for routers, switches, media players and many other small form-factor devices, the IcyPad. In 2014, the company launched the first 6-channel fan controller with touch screen and 30W power output per channel, the SpeedTouch 6.

In June 2015, GELID Solutions announced a new product series, wearables and wireless chargers at Computex Taipei.

== Products ==
- Air and liquid cooling
- Wearables
- Energy management accessories
