= A4Tech =

Taiwanese computer peripherals company

A4Tech Co., Ltd.
- Company type: Private
- Industry: Computer hardware Electronics
- Founded: August 1987; 38 years ago
- Founder: Robert Cheng
- Headquarters: Xindian, New Taipei, Taiwan
- Area served: Worldwide
- Products: Keyboards, Mice, PC Cameras, Hubs, Gaming Devices
- Number of employees: 2500
- Subsidiaries: Bloody Gaming; X7 Gaming
- Website: www.a4tech.com

A4Tech Co., Ltd. is a Taiwanese computer hardware and electronics company headquartered in New Taipei, Taiwan. A4Tech was founded in 1987 by Robert Cheng. The first activity of the company was the production of computer mice. In the future, the range of products was replenished with other types of computer peripherals.

From the moment of its foundation to the present day, the company is private. The number of owners and their shares in the authorized capital were not disclosed. The company also does not publish profit and loss statements, sales data and other financial statements.

== History ==
A4tech was founded in 1987 by Robert Cheng. A4tech used to make peripherals mainly for office and home use. After seeing growth and having a large growth of customers, they soon targeted gamers with their gaming peripherals.

As of 2015, A4Tech has turned its attention to the North American market with a new gaming brand called "Bloody".

== Products ==
PC peripherals:

- Keyboards, mice (wired, wireless, Bluetooth models)
- Webcams
- Computer speakers
- Headphones and headsets
- Merchandise and other products for gamers

== Bloody Gaming ==
In 2011, A4Tech launched its secondary PC gaming brand – Bloody Gaming. Initial products focused on the integration of optical switches into gaming peripherals - specifically keyboards and gaming mice.

At the CES 2018 expo in Las Vegas, Bloody introduced the third generation of Light Strike technology (dubbed LK Libra) and launched its full upgraded keyboard portfolio by February 2018.
