= Antec =

Taiwanese PC component and consumer tech product manufacturer

Antec, Inc.
- Company type: Public
- Traded as: TPEx: 6276
- Industry: Computer industry Computer hardware Mobile devices
- Founded: 1986; 40 years ago
- Headquarters: Taiwan
- Key people: Frank Lee (CEO), Wendy Tang, Eric Chen
- Products: Computer cases; Power supplies; Computer cooling; Electric generator; Mobile audio products; PC accessories; Notebook accessories
- Revenue: ▲ ~US$ 61 million (2020)
- Number of employees: 71
- Website: www.antec.com

Antec, Inc. (Chinese: 安鈦克; pinyin: Āntàikè) is a Taiwanese manufacturer of personal computer (PC) components and consumer tech products. Antec's principal products are computer cases and power supplies. Antec also offers PC cooling products, notebook accessories, and previously offered a line of Antec Mobile Products (A.M.P.) which included Bluetooth speakers, headphones, portable batteries, and charging hubs. Antec joined the handheld PC gaming market globally with the CORE HS which is a 32GB/2TB AMD 7840u based Windows 11 device with a 1080p screen and gaming controller built into the device. Originally founded in 1986 in Fremont, California, the company is now headquartered in Taipei City, with additional offices in Rotterdam, Beijing, and Fremont, California. Antec pioneered a number of innovations in the PC case industry, including the switch from beige to black exterior color, and first cases specifically designed for noise reduction with the Sonata and P180. In 2011, Antec was purchased by Ming-Jong Technologies Ltd. of Taiwan, and the combined company adopted the Antec name. Antec products are sold in over 40 countries through its online retail platform, Amazon, and distribution partners. The company is publicly traded on the Taipei stock exchange under ticker 6276.

== Products ==
- Computer enclosures
- Computer power supplies
- Computer cooling products

== Antec Mobile Products (a.m.p) ==
In October 2012, Antec launched the now-defunct Antec Mobile Products (A.M.P.), a wholly owned subsidiary of Antec. The product range included a line of Bluetooth audio devices, USB-powered battery packs and mobile chargers.

== Console Gaming ==
Antec entered the console gaming sector with the X-1 Cooler for the Xbox One in 2015 which received positive reviews. The cooler prevented the console from over-heating while in use and helped preserve the lifespan of the console.
