= HT Omega =

American audio hardware company

HT Omega, Inc.
- Company type: Private
- Industry: Computer hardware
- Founded: 2006
- Headquarters: Ontario, California, United States
- Key people: Howard An (President)
- Products: Sound cards
- Subsidiaries: HT Omega Korea?
- Website: htomega.com

HT Omega is an audio hardware manufacturing company based in Ontario, California. It designs and builds multimedia hardware and peripherals for personal computer and professional markets. HT Omega has a dedicated research & development division, creating equipment based on Dolby Digital and DTS technologies, marketed towards gamers and home entertainment enthusiasts.

== Product line ==
HT Omega was one of the first companies to offer true 24-bit (192 kHz) performance in its sound cards, by implementing the C-Media Oxygen 8788 digital signal processor. Some cards have swappable op-amps.

HT Omega's line of PC audio cards includes the following:

- STRIKER 7.1 (Conventional PCI)
- CLARO, CLARO plus + (PCI)
- eCLARO (PCI Express)
- CLARO halo, halo XT (PCI)
- Fenix (PCI Express)
