= Strontium Technology =

Strontium Technology Pte. Ltd
- Type: Private
- Industry: Technology
- Founded: 2002; 24 years ago, Singapore
- Founder: Vivian Singh; Anshuman Gupta
- Headquarters: Paya Lebar, Singapore
- Area served: Worldwide
- Key people: Vivian Singh (President & CEO)
- Products: DRAM; Flash Memory Cards; USB Flash Drives; Solid-state drive
- Website: Official website

Strontium Technology Pte Ltd is a PC and flash memory manufacturing company, having its headquarters in Singapore. Today, its operations span to varied territories across Australia, Botswana, New Zealand, South East Asia, Indonesia, Africa, Middle East, Russia, India, US, Canada and Latin America. In total, the company maintains a strong market presence in over 35 countries. Strontium Technology serves an international network of distributors, resellers, retailers and OEM customers.

== History ==
Strontium Technology was founded in 2002 by Mr. Vivian Singh and Mr. Anshuman Gupta, who started the operations in Singapore and gradually expanded to South East Asia, Indonesia, Australia, New Zealand, India and USA. It actively collaborates with Hynix Semiconductor, Micron Technology, Samsung Electronics and Toshiba Corporation, with many of their integrated circuits incorporated into Strontium-branded memory.

== Awards and recognition ==
- 2010 - Singapore Top 50
