= Apacer =

Taiwanese multinational corporation

Apacer Technology Inc. 宇瞻科技股份有限公司
- Type: Public
- Traded as: TWSE: 8271
- Industry: Storage devices
- Founded: 1997; 29 years ago
- Headquarters: Tucheng, New Taipei, Taiwan
- Area served: Worldwide
- Key people: I-Shih Chen (Chairman); Chia-Kun Chang (President)
- Products: Flash memory cards USB flash drives External hard drives Mobile phone Accessories; DRAM; SSD; Overclocking & Gaming; Industrial Products
- Number of employees: 471 (2022)
- Website: www.apacer.com (Apacer Official Website), International websites, see "External Links" section in this article.

Apacer Technology Inc. (Chinese: 宇瞻科技股份有限公司; pinyin: Yǔzhān Kējì Gǔfèn Yǒuxiàn Gōngsī) is a Taiwanese multinational corporation that designs and markets consumer electronics, memory modules and digital storage hardware and software.

== See also ==
- List of companies of Taiwan
