= XFX =

American computer hardware company

XFX Technology Inc.
- Company type: Subsidiary
- Industry: Manufacturing
- Founded: 2001; 25 years ago
- Founder: Michael Chiu
- Headquarters: Ontario, California, U.S.
- Products: Video cards, motherboards and PSUs
- Revenue: $280 million (2007)
- Parent: Pine Technology Holdings Limited
- Website: www.xfxforce.com

XFX Technology Inc. is an American computer hardware company that specializes in the manufacturing of video cards, power supplies and motherboards. XFX is headquartered in Ontario, California and is a subsidiary of Hong Kong-based Pine Technology Holdings Limited (SEHK: 1079), founded by Michael Chiu.

XFX's previous logo

== Video cards ==
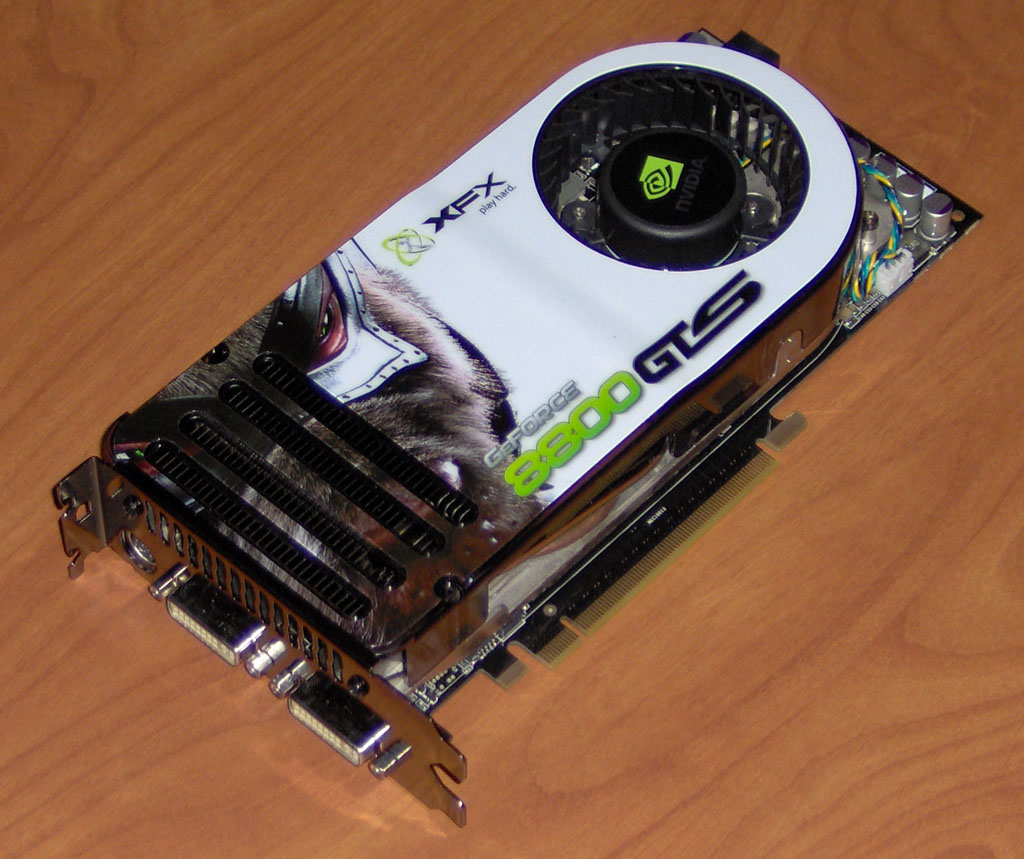
An XFX-manufactured Nvidia GeForce 8800 GTS video card

Originally, XFX produced only Nvidia graphics cards; in 2009, XFX began manufacturing AMD (known as ATI at the time) graphics cards. XFX continued selling mid-range Nvidia cards through early 2010, then ceased producing any Nvidia graphics cards in October 2010.

=== Warranty ===
All XFX graphics cards sold in the US or Canada previously came with a "double-lifetime" warranty. This warranty gave lifetime coverage to the original buyer and a subsequent owner of the used graphics card. However, it was only valid if the card was registered with XFX directly within 30 days of purchase. In January 2012, with the introduction of its Radeon HD 7970 graphics cards, XFX silently discontinued the program, stating it was no longer profitable nor sustainable.

=== Fatal1ty video cards ===
In 2006, XFX made an agreement to use the name of a computer tournament game player, Johnathan "Fatal1ty" Wendel, on a division of graphics cards.

XFX began selling power supplies in 2009, with their first unit being an 850w model under the branding "Black Edition". XFX exclusively uses Seasonic topologies in their power supplies.
