= KWorld =

Taiwanese Technology Company

KWorld Computer Co. Ltd
- KWorld logo
- Type: Public (TSEC: T3287)
- Industry: Computer hardware, Digital television, CCTV
- Founded: May 1999
- Headquarters: Jhonghe City, Taiwan
- Revenue: $24 million USD (2007)
- Number of employees: 120
- Subsidiaries: U.S., Brazil, India, Australia, Malaysia, Japan, Spain, UK Russia, Singapore, Thailand

KWorld Computer Co. Ltd (Chinese: 廣寰科技股份有限公司) is a Taiwan-based technology company that specializes in Computer accessories and hardware. In the past known for producing TV tuner cards and CCTV. Founded in 1999, the company is primary a computer accessories and hardware manufacturer in Taiwan. They were an audio/video hardware developer and provider. The company offered analogue, digital, hybrid, satellite TV tuners, and video/audio capture/editing cards and boxes. Currently KWorld Computer is a manufacture of Mechanical keyboard, Computer mouse, headsets, Computer case, Computer fan, CPU cooling, and PSU.

KWorld developed TV tuners for PAL, NTSC, and SECAM analogue television systems and for DVB-T, DVB-S, ISDB-T, DMB-T/H, ATSC, and IPTV digital television systems. KWorld also developed video capture/editing and audio capture/editing devices for both Macintosh and Microsoft Windows operating systems. The Taiwan Intellectual Property Management System (TIPS) certified KWorld in 2008. In 2013 KWorld Computer's market focus became manufacturing PC based peripherals and components. A year later the PC peripheral brand named, Gamdias was established in California, USA.

A 2020 Money Weekly article noted that the company's revenue experienced a steep drop owing to a substantial decrease in customers' purchases of KWorld's video products. It turned its attention to other ventures including earphone products and making mobile streaming software.

Kworld Computer produces PC peripherals and components under its Gamdias brand. The brand has demonstrated notable search interest in markets such as Brazil, India, the Philippines, Sri Lanka, Myanmar, and South Africa. Despite new products, the growing brand Gamdias has lost tracking starting early 2025 and decelerated during 2026. Kworld Computer continues expanding its manufacturing revenue, its original equipment manufacturer (OEM) and original design manufacturer (ODM) services have been on the decline internationally, but has stabled in the United States.

== See also ==
- List of companies of Taiwan
