= Vigor Gaming =

Privately held computer manufacturer

Vigor Gaming Computer
- Type: Privately held
- Founded: 2004; 22 years ago
- Headquarters: City of Industry, California
- Products: Enthusiast personal computers
- Parent: REKEN, Inc.

Vigor Gaming was a privately held manufacturer of enthusiast level personal computers based in City of Industry, California. The company was founded in 2004 by several former employees and the former owner of competing company. Vigor Gaming Computers were designed specifically for gaming enthusiasts, and are broken down into various models with varying capabilities. Vigor offered several different models of desktop computers and laptop computers with prices ranging from sub $1,000 all the way up to $15,000 for a fully configured gaming PC. Vigor gaming also produced enthusiast grade components, including their Monsoon II Thermoelectric cooling solution designed to aid in overclocking.

== Bankruptcy ==
In March 2010, news broke that Vigor Gaming had become bankrupt and defunct. During the month Vigor's customer support became unreachable by phone or e-mail. All customer orders pending were left unfulfilled.

== Industry recognition ==
Vigor Gaming PCs have received a lot of attention in various print magazines such as PC Magazine, Maximum PC, and Computer Shopper, but their most publicized product has been the Monsoon II thermoelectric cooling solution. This device, which incorporates active TEC technology with a powerful air-cooler, received much acclaim on enthusiast hardware review sites, such as Tom's Hardware, GotFrag Hardware, TweakTown, PC Perspective, and AnandTech.

== See also ==
- List of Computer System Manufacturers
