= Silicon Power =

Taiwan-based electronics manufacturer

Silicon Power Computer & Communications Inc. 廣穎電通股份有限公司

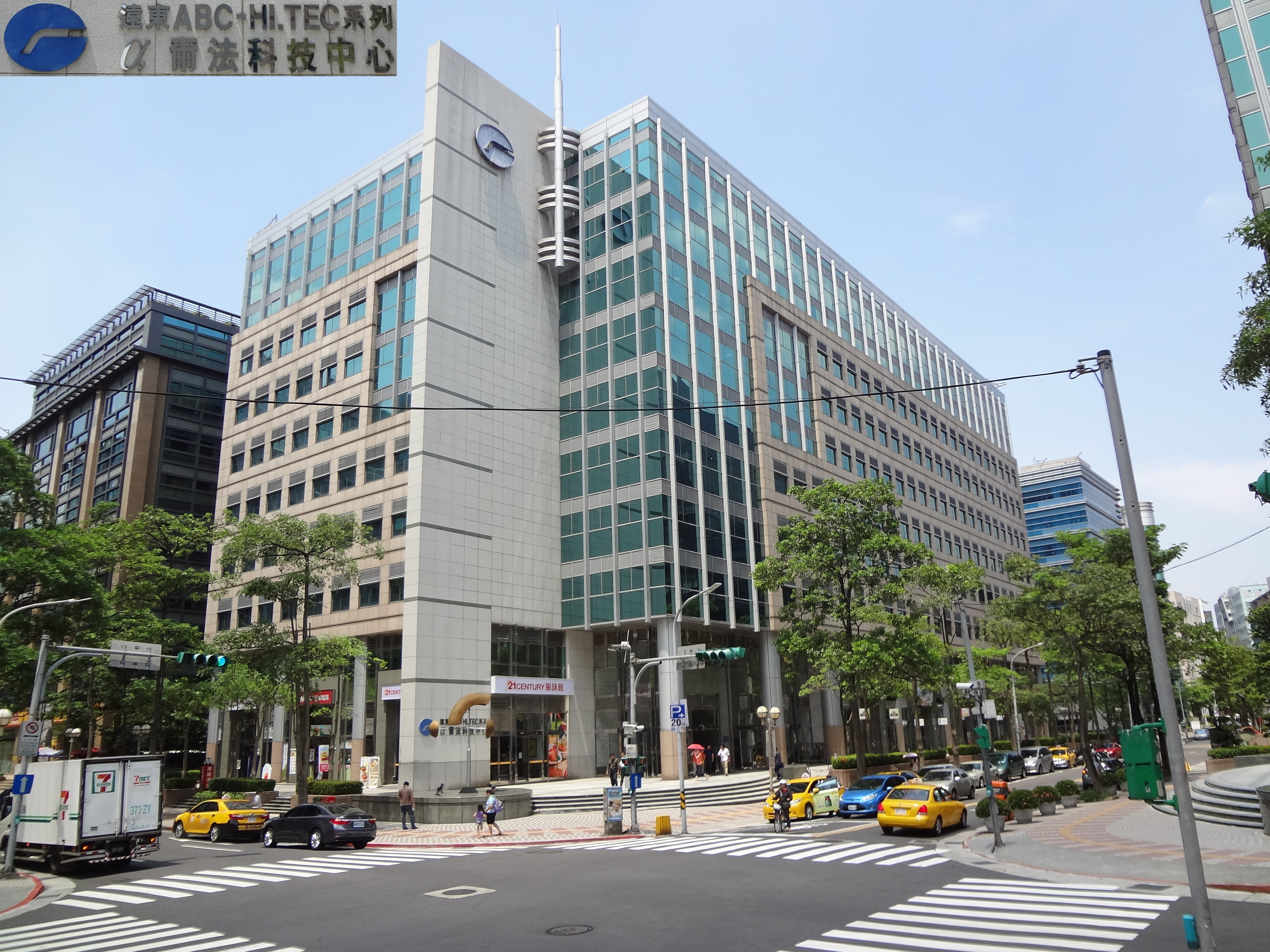
- Type: Public company
- Traded as: TPEx: 4973
- Industry: Information technology, storage devices, electronics
- Founded: 2003; 23 years ago in Taipei, Taiwan
- Headquarters: Taipei, Taiwan
- Products: Solid state drives USB flash drives Flash memory cards Portable hard drives DRAM modules Card readers USB 3.0 adapters Industrial products
- Revenue: NT$4.34 billion (2022)
- Number of employees: 500–1000
- Website: www.silicon-power.com

Silicon Power Computer & Communications Incorporated, commonly referred to as Silicon Power and as SP, is an international brand and a Taiwan-based manufacturer of flash memory products, including flash memory cards, USB flash drives, portable hard drives, DRAM modules, card readers, solid-state drives, USB adapters, and other industrial-grade computer products.

== Overview ==
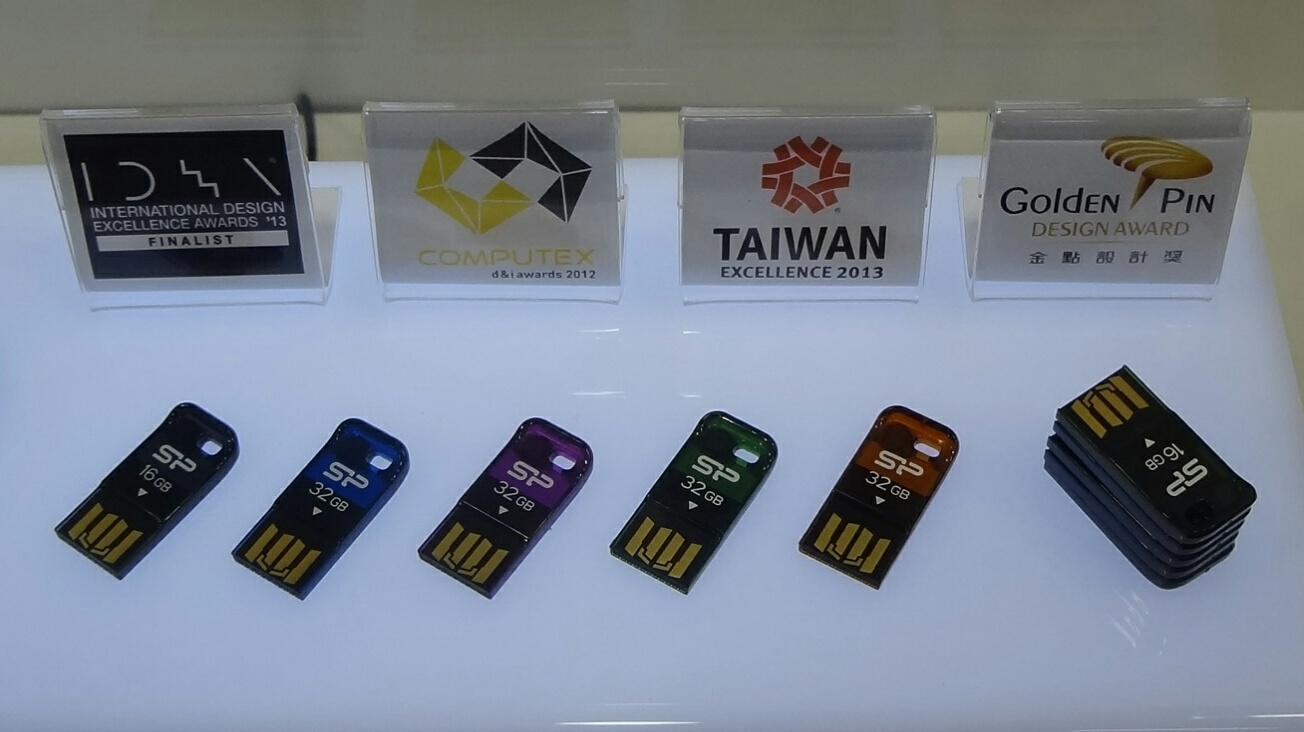
Silicon Power Touch T02

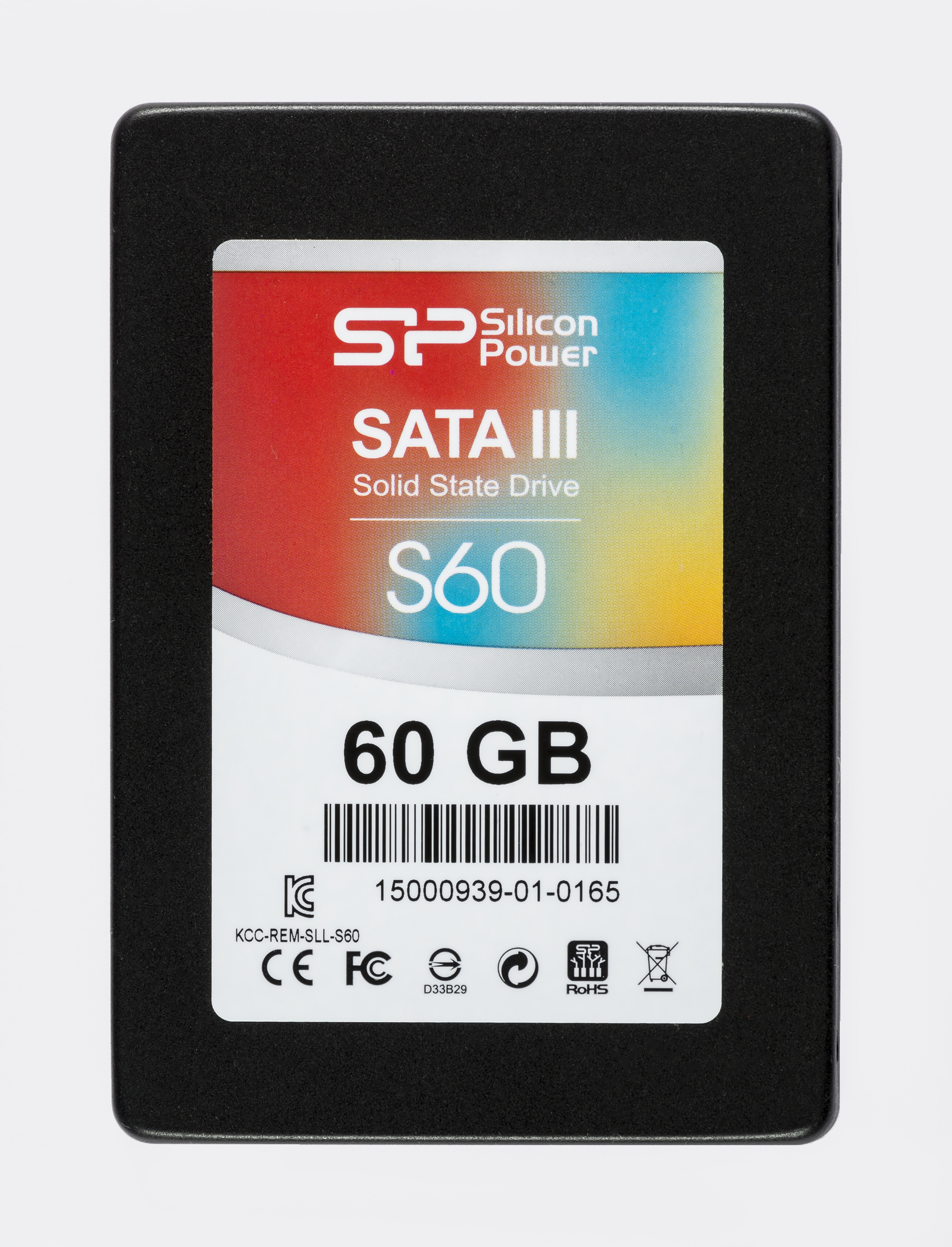
2015 Dysk SSD Silicon Power 60 GB (02)

Silicon Power is headquartered in the Neihu district of Taipei, Taiwan, and was founded in 2003. Silicon Power produces digital memory.

== Corporate information ==
Silicon Power has offices in Taiwan, Japan, the Netherlands, Balkan, China, India, the United States, as well as manufacturing facilities in Taiwan and logistics facilities in Taiwan and Netherlands. In 2012, Silicon Power became a public company on the Taipei Exchange.

In a 2010 survey by the Common Wealth Magazine, Silicon Power was ranked 11th in the top 1,000 fastest growing manufacturers in Taiwan, and first in the semiconductor industry.

== History ==
Silicon Power was founded in the Neihu district of Taipei, Taiwan, in 2003. Between 2004 and 2008, branches were opened in the Netherlands and Japan.

== See also ==
- List of companies of Taiwan
