= AOpen =

Taiwanese multinational electronics corporation

AOpen Inc.
- Native name: 建碁股份有限公司
- Type: Public
- Traded as: TWSE: 3046
- Industry: Computer
- Founded: 1996; 30 years ago
- Headquarters: Taipei, Taiwan
- Key people: Victor Chien (Chairman); Ken Wang (President)
- Products: Small form factor system, Digital Engine, XC mini, eTILE, All-in-one touch system, Chrome commercial devices, Gaming/Consumer/Commercial/Portable monitor, and Pico projector
- Parent: Acer Inc.
- Website: www.aopen.com/US_en/index.html

AOpen (Chinese: 建碁股份有限公司; pinyin: Jiànqí Gǔfèn Yǒuxiàn Gōngsī, stylized AOPEN) is a minor Taiwanese electronics manufacturer that makes computers and its parts. AOpen used to be the Open System Business Unit of Acer Computer Inc. which designed, manufactured and sold computer components.

The company was incorporated in December 1996 as a subsidiary of Acer Group with an initial public offering (IPO) at the Taiwan stock exchange in August 2002. It is also the first subsidiary that established the entrepreneurship paradigm in the pan-Acer Group. At that time, AOpen's major shareholder was the Wistron Group. In 2018, AOpen became a partner of the pan-Acer Group again as the business-to-business branch of the computing industry.

AOpen is perhaps most well known for their mobile on desktop (MoDT), which implements Intel's Pentium M platform on desktop motherboards. Because the Pentium 4 and other NetBurst CPUs proved less energy efficient than the Pentium M, in late 2004 and early 2005, many manufacturers introduced desktop motherboards for the mobile Pentium M, AOpen being one of the first.

AOpen currently specializes in ultra small form factor (uSFF) platform applications; digital signage; and product development and designs characterized by miniaturization, standardization and modularization.

AOpen logo used from 1996 to 2013

== Product position and strategies ==
AOpen has developed energy-saving products since 2005. According to different types of customers, applications and contexts, AOpen splits its product platforms into two major categories: media player platform and Panel PC platform, both of which have Windows, Linux, ChromeOS and Android devices.

== See also ==
- List of companies of Taiwan
