= Simmtronics =

Indian computer technology company

Simmtronics Infotech Pvt Ltd
- Type: Pvt Ltd
- Industry: Computer peripherals
- Founded: 2005; 21 years ago
- Headquarters: New Delhi, Delhi, India
- Products: Memory cards; USB flash drives; Laptop RAM; Desktop RAM
- Website: www.simmtronics.co.in

Simmtronics Infotech Pvt. Ltd is a multinational technology company, headquartered in India, operating in the segments of computer hardware manufacturing and development. It sells and supports computer related products such as laptop RAM, desktop RAM, pen drives, and Micro SD cards.

Simmtronics also processes, tests and resells hard disk drives under its label, originally manufactured by other suppliers (e.g. Western Digital, Seagate). The company was founded in Delhi, India Simmtronics has sales and subsidiary offices in Algeria, France, Mauritius, Macedonia, Nepal, Singapore, Sri Lanka, Thailand, United Kingdom, United States, Vietnam and U.A.E.

== History ==
Simmtronics Infotech Pvt Ltd.

In December 2010, VIA Technologies tied-up with Simmtronics as Exclusive Manufacturing and Distribution Partner for 'VIA pc-1' Mainboards in India, covering 15 other countries in SAARC, Middle East and Africa.

== Products ==
The company's products include:

- Desktop RAM
- Laptop RAM
- Pen Drive/Flash Drive
- Micro SD cards
