= Plantronics Gamecom =

Plantronics GameCom
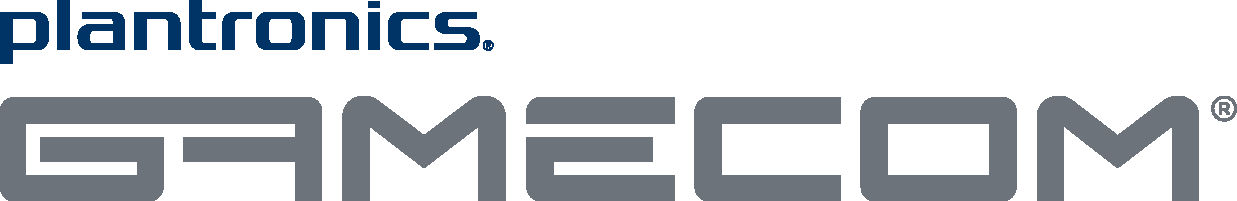
- Industry: Consumer electronics
- Founded: 2004; 22 years ago
- Headquarters: Santa Cruz, California, U.S.
- Products: headsets
- Website: www.poly.com/us/en

GameCom is the gaming sub-brand of Plantronics, officially trademarked as Plantronics GameCom. Though Plantronics produced gaming headsets as far back as 1999, in 2004 the GameCom brand was created to encompass their gaming headset family. Since then, GameCom has released headsets compatible with both console and PC gaming platforms, hosted gaming tournaments, and sponsored professional gaming teams.

== History ==
=== 1999-2003 ===
In 1999 Plantronics entered the PC gaming headset market first releasing headsets in the .Audio line, such as the .Audio 90 analog headset, followed by a line of USB PC headsets, most notably the DSP-500.

In 2002, Plantronics started on the path to GameCom by partnering with Microsoft to create the first headset to be released in conjunction with Xbox Communicator to enable voice communication with Xbox Live. online gaming service. In June 2003 Plantronics and Valve released a Counter-Strike branded headset based on the DSP-500.

=== 2004 ===
After successful sales for the DSP-500 and the Xbox Communicator headsets,

In 2004, Plantronics announced the GameCom brand with four new headsets for Xbox Live and Online PC gamers: GameCom X10 and X20 for Xbox Communicator, and GameCom 1 (analog) and GameCom Pro 1 with digital signal processing built-in sound card and connected to a PC via USB port.

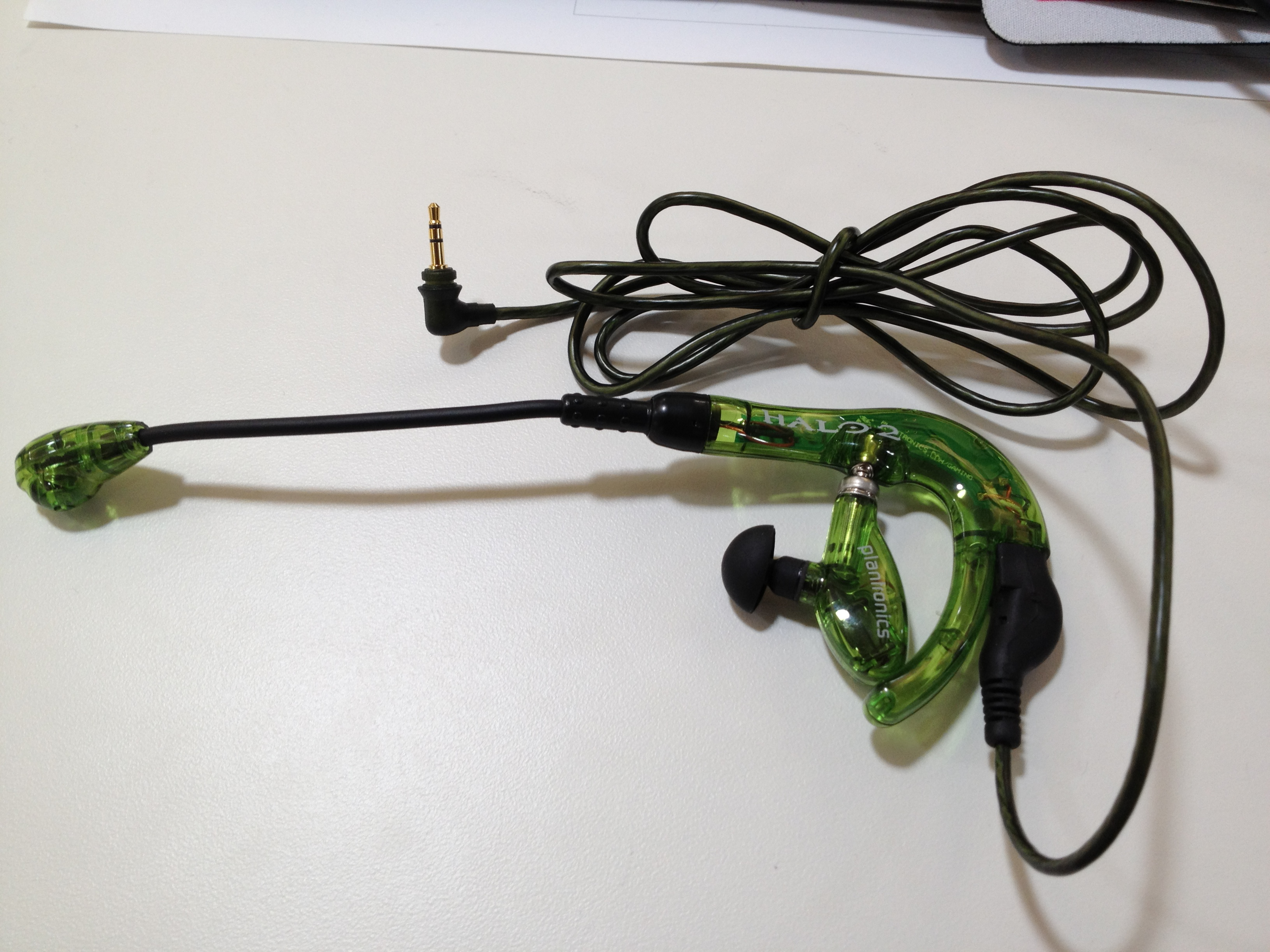
GameCom Halo 2 Edition headset

In October 2004, Plantronics released the GameCom Halo 2 Edition—a custom wired monaural headset built specifically for playing Halo 2 online with Xbox Live.

=== 2005-2009 ===
GameCom was selected as the official licensee of the Xbox Communicator and headset bundle, specifically the GameCom X10C headset, to be released for the Xbox 360 console.

In 2006, Plantronics GameCom released three new Xbox headsets: GameCom X10, GameCom X20, and GameCom X30 for use with the Xbox 360. The GameCom X30 received the CES 2007 Best of Innovations Electronic Gaming Category.

Plantronics continued to expand in the PC gaming headset market with the release of the GameCom 777 in 2008, a PC headset that featured virtual 5.1 Dolby Surround sound. Two other PC headsets, the GameCom 367 and GameCom 377 were released concurrently with the 777.

=== 2010-2011 ===
In 2010, Plantronics GameCom released the GameCom X95 headset that featured wireless stereo audio and communication for the Xbox 360 as well as a wired Xbox headset, the GameCom X40. Additionally, GameCom entered the PlayStation 3 wireless headset market with the release of the GameCom P90 which also featured the ability to connect to mobile phones.

=== 2012 ===
The Plantronics GameCom 777 headset was honored with a CES Innovations Design and Engineering award in the headphones category for 2011.

In January 2012 Plantronics GameCom released the GameCom 380 (analog) and the GameCom 780 (digital). The 780 features optional Dolby 7.1 virtual surround sound.

== Sponsorship ==
GameCom sponsored professional gaming teams and clans. In 2008 GameCom sponsored PMS Clan at ESWC 2008 in Paris as well as Frag Dolls at PAX 2008. Currently Plantronics GameCom sponsors Team Dynamic for various games including Counter-Strike: Source and League of Legends.

== ESWC 2012 ==
Plantronics GameCom hosted the North America Qualifier rounds for the 2012 Electronic Sports World Cup tournament in Paris, France for League of Legends, Dota 2, and Counter-Strike: GO. This means all competitors and teams must compete in the online tournaments through GameCom in order to go to PAX Prime 2012, and the winners of which went to ESWC 2012 in November.

== Comparison of headsets ==
Model	Platform	Connection Type	Speaker	Speaker Frequency Response	Mic Frequency Response	Dolby Virtual Surround	Weight (oz)
307	PC	2 x 3.5 mm audio/mic jacks	40 mm stereo	20 Hz - 20 kHz	100 Hz - 8 kHz	No	
380	PC	2 x 3.5 mm audio/mic jacks	40 mm stereo	20 Hz - 20 kHz	100 Hz - 8 kHz	No	13.6
780	PC (PS3 w/o 7.1)	USB	40 mm stereo	20 Hz - 20 kHz	100 Hz - 10 kHz	7.1	14.4
Commander	PC	2 x 3.5 mm audio/mic jacks	40 mm stereo	20 Hz - 18 kHz	100 Hz - 10 kHz	7.1	13.4
P90	PS3, Mobile phone	Bluetooth wireless	monaural			No	0.4
X10	Xbox 360	Xbox controller, 2.5 mm jack	monaural		100 Hz - 8 kHz	No	8
X30	Xbox 360	Xbox controller, 2.5 mm jack	monaural		100 Hz - 8 kHz	No	
X40	Xbox 360	Xbox controller, 2.5 mm jack	40 mm stereo	20 Hz - 20 kHz	100 Hz - 8 kHz	No	
X95	Xbox 360	Wireless, 3.5 mm	40 mm stereo	20 Hz - 20 kHz	100 Hz - 8 kHz	No	

== See also ==
- Plantronics
- Santa Cruz, California
- Penny Arcade Expo
- Electronic Sports World Cup
