= IBall (company) =

Indian Technology and consumer electronics company

iBall
- Type: Private
- Industry: Technology; Consumer electronics; Computer hardware; Electronics
- Founded: 24 September 2001; 25 years ago
- Founder: Sandeep Parasrampuria; Anil Parasrampuria
- Headquarters: Mumbai, Maharashtra, India
- Area served: Worldwide
- Key people: (Directors): Anil Parasrampuria; Sunil Kedia; Rakesh Shah
- Products: Laptops; Routers; Tablet; Earphone; Speaker; Computer hardware; Peripherals; Smartphone
- Revenue: ▲₹2,000 crore (US$210 million)
- Owner: Anil Parasrampuria
- Number of employees: 2,000+
- Parent: Zebronics
- Website: www.iball.co.in

iBall is an Indian multinational technology and electronics company, headquartered in Mumbai, Maharashtra, India. It manufactures computer peripherals, smartphones and tablets from original equipment manufacturers (OEMs). iBall was incorporated in September 2001 by Anil Parasrampuria, initially selling computer mice. In January 2026, iBall entered a new growth phase after being acquired by Zebronics India Pvt Ltd, a major homegrown tech and lifestyle brand in India..

== History ==
=== 2001: Foundation ===
iBall was founded in 2001 as a PC peripherals company. Its early products included computer mice, keyboards, speakers, cabinets, UPS systems and storage devices.

=== 2010: Expansion into Mobiles ===
In 2010, iBall entered the smartphone and tablet market, with Andi smartphone series, Slide tablet series and CompBook laptops. It mainly focused on affordable devices for the Indian market.

=== 2020: Reduced Mobile Focus ===
In 2020, iBall reduced its smartphone activity and instead focussed on computer accessories, audio devices, networking devices.

=== 2026: Acquisition by Zebronics ===
In January 2026, iBall was acquired by Zebronics. This acquisition was announced as a relaunch and revival of the iBall brand using Zebronics' manufacturing distribution and service network.

== Products ==
As of 2011, the company sold consumer electronics products in 28 different product categories. In 2014, iBall launched the Andi Uddaan smartphone for women. An SOS button located at the back of the phone sounds a loud siren and automatically sends text messages (SMS) to five pre-selected contacts when pressed.

In May 2015, iBall launched the iBall Slide i701 in collaboration with Intel and Microsoft.

In May 2016, iBall entered into a strategic partnership with Intel and Microsoft claimed to have launched India's most affordable Windows 10 Laptop, iBall CompBook at ₹9,999.

In 2026, after iBall was acquired by Zebronics, it launched new peripherals like, wireless microphones, keyboard - mouse combos, laptop stands, earphones, webcams and monitors.

== Awards ==
In 2020, iBall won the MEA Award for Innovative Use of Ambient Media.
