= CTI Electronics Corporation =

CTI Electronics Corporation is a manufacturer of industrial computer peripherals such as rugged keyboards, pointing devices, motion controllers, analog joysticks, USB keypads and many other industrial, military, medical, or aerospace grade input devices. CTI Electronics Corporation products are made in the United States and it is a well-known supplier of input devices to some of the most notable private defense contractors in the world, including Lockheed Martin, DRS Technologies, Computer Sciences Corporation, General Dynamics, BAE Systems, L3 Communications, AAI, Northrop Grumman, Raytheon, Boeing, Thales Group and many more companies that provide security and defense around the world. CTI also supplies Homeland Security and United States Department of Defense supporting their efforts in protecting and serving the country and military personnel of the United States.

== Background ==
CTI Electronics Corporation was started in 1986 and is currently located in Stratford, Connecticut.

== Industries ==
CTI's products are used in a variety of industries and specialize in reliable industrial-grade input devices for use harsh environments. Its products are currently being used in the control systems of UAVs, UUVs, and UGVs. CTI has also donated industrial joysticks to students of UW-Madison to for research into the Standing Paraplegic Omni-directional Transport (SPOT)

== Product certifications ==
- NEMA 4
- NEMA 4X
- NEMA 12
- IP54
- IP66
- RoHS
- CE
- ISO 9001:2008
