= Thinksound =

Canadian audio equipment manufacturer

thinksound
- Type: Privately held company
- Industry: Audio
- Founded: 2009
- Headquarters: Toronto, Ontario, Canada
- Key people: Aaron Fournier (President, Co-Founder, Chief Product Officer); Andrew Grubb (Chief Executive Officer); Mark Forward (Chief Marketing Officer)
- Products: Headphones; Audio equipment
- Website: www.thinksound.com

Thinksound (stylized as thinksound) is an independent manufacturer of headphones and audio equipment based in Toronto, Ontario. The company manufactured wooden earphones which it claims are more environmentally friendly and sound better than earphones made from plastic and metal.

== History ==
Thinksound was founded in 2009 by Aaron Fournier and Mike Tunney.
