= Microlab =

Audio electronics manufacturer

Microlab Inc.
- Available in: English
- Headquarters: Shenzhen, {{{location_country}}}
- Area served: Worldwide
- Industry: Manufacturer
- Website: http://microlab.com/
- Launched: 1998

Microlab Inc. is a global audio electronics manufacturer based in Shenzhen, China that specializes in the research, development, and production of multimedia speakers, AV speakers, and peripheral products. It was founded in 1998, as a joint venture between Shenzhen Microlab Technology Inc. and International Microlab Blue Electronics Technology Co., Ltd.

== Products ==
Some of the company's products include FineCone speakers, Portable iPod/iPhone docks, Multimedia Speakers, General stereo speakers, the TMN Series, home theatre systems, the Soundbar Series, and the PURE Signatory Series. It is also a producer of headphones.
