= Lian Li =

Taiwanese computer case and accessories manufacturer

Lian Li Industrial Co., Ltd.

- Lian Li headquarters in Keelung, 2015
- Native name: 聯力工業股份有限公司
- Type: Co., Ltd.
- Industry: Computer
- Founded: 1983; 43 years ago
- Headquarters: Qidu, Keelung, Taiwan
- Products: Computer case Computer desk Power supplies Computer cooling
- Number of employees: 153
- Website: lian-li.com

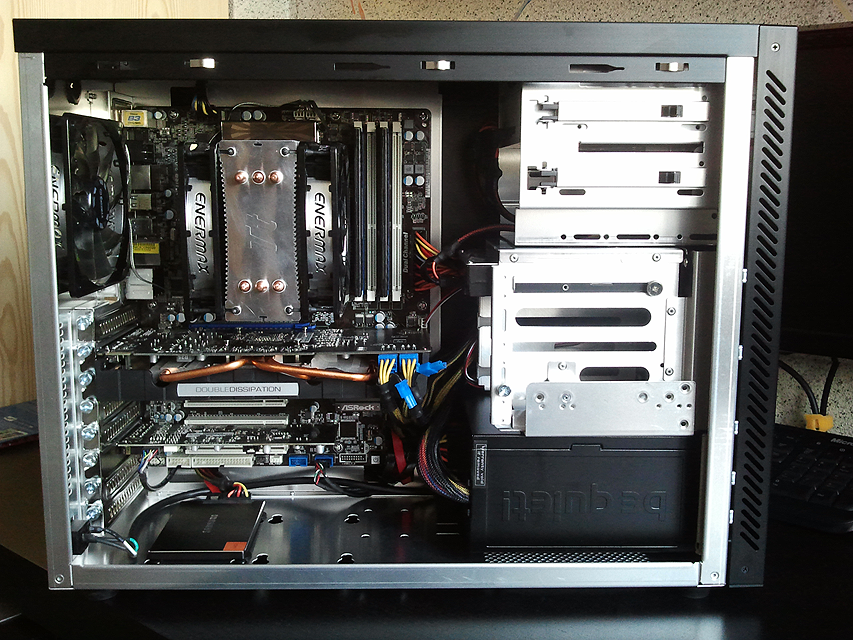
Inside of a Lian Li PC-A05FN computer case

Lian Li Industrial Co., Ltd. (Chinese: 聯力工業股份有限公司; pinyin: Lián Lì Gōngyè Gǔfènyǒuxiàngōngsī; lit. 'allied force industry') is a Taiwanese computer case and accessories manufacturer. It is one of the largest manufacturers of aluminium computer cases in Taiwan and is also a major world competitor in the premium aftermarket computer case industry.

== Products ==
Lian Li cases are constructed with either brushed or anodised aluminium and are lightweight and offered in silver, black, grey, golden, red, blue, and green shades. In addition to their various cases, they produce aluminum desks, power supplies and accessories such as window kits, CPU coolers, Liquid CPU Coolers, fans, removable hard drive bays, bezel covers, and memory card readers. The company also provides OEM and ODM services.

== History ==
Lian Li Industrial Co., Ltd. was founded in 1983.

== Location ==
Lian Li has its headquarters in the Liudu Industrial Park (六堵工業區, Liùdǔ Gōngyèqū) in Keelung.

== Subsidiary brand ==
In 2009 Lian Li launched LanCool as a subsidiary to produce cases without their signature aluminium in an effort to bring costs down. These cases feature a tool-less architecture aimed at gamers and PC enthusiasts. With LanCool producing the non-aluminium midtower cases, Lian Li is well known as a high-end aluminium chassis manufacturer. In August 2018, after years without new product releases, Lian Li revived the LanCool branding and presented the LanCool One chassis featuring tempered glass panels and RGB lighting.
