= Wilk Elektronik =

Polish computer memory manufacturer

Wilk Elektronik S.A.
- Type: Joint stock company
- Industry: Computer
- Founded: 1991; 35 years ago
- Founders: Wiesław Wilk
- Headquarters: Łaziska Górne, Poland
- Key people: Wiesław Wilk (CEO)
- Products: RAM, Flash memory
- Number of employees: (130)
- Website: www.goodram.com

Wilk Elektronik is a Polish manufacturer of computer memory under the brand name "GOODRAM" based in Łaziska Górne. After the bankruptcy of Qimonda it remains the only European producer of RAM modules.

== History ==
The company was established in Tychy in 1991 as a RAM distributor. In 1996 it became the leader in the Polish memory distribution market. In 2003 the company moved to Łaziska Górne where it has been manufacturing its own products under the brand name "GOODRAM" ever since. Another brand, "Gooddrive", under which flash drives and SSD had been sold, was replaced in 2011 with the unified "GOODRAM" brand.

Since 2008, WE has been the official distributor of Toshiba flash products for Central Europe as well as Middle East and Africa. It also cooperates with Elpida, Micron and Samsung.

In 2009, Wilk Elektronik's revenues reached above 100 mil. USD.

W.E. was ranked 43rd in a 2009 ranking of 200 Polish IT-companies compiled by Computerworld.

== Products ==
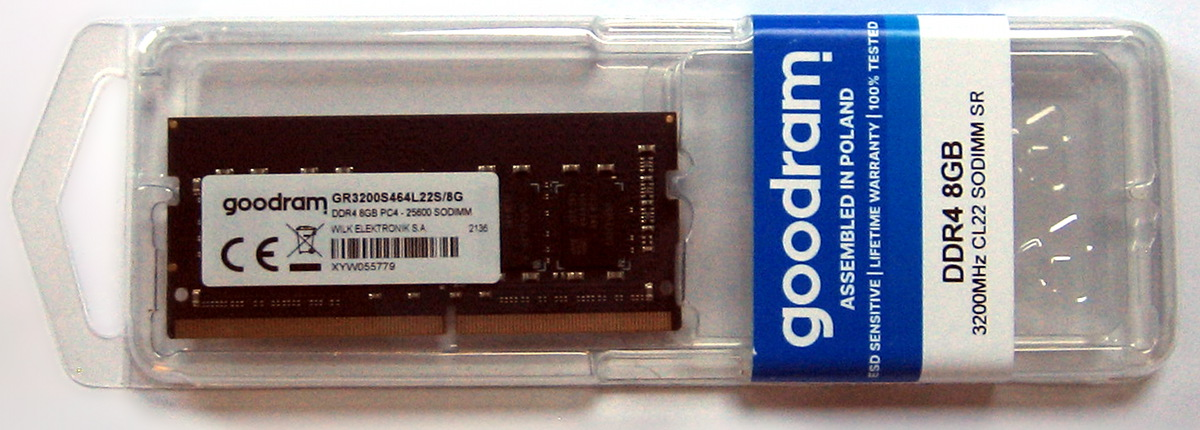
Goodram DDR4 SODIMM

- RAM modules
- Memory cards
- USB flash drives
- Solid-state drives
