= StarTech.com =

Canadian technology manufacturer

StarTech.com Ltd.
- Formerly: StarTech Computer Accessories
- Type: Private
- Industry: Information technology
- Founded: 1985; 41 years ago
- Founder: Paul Seed; Ken Kalopsis
- Headquarters: London, Ontario, Canada
- Area served: Worldwide
- Revenue: ▲CA$300 million (2018)
- Number of employees: 300+
- Website: www.startech.com

StarTech.com Ltd. (formerly StarTech Computer Accessories) is a Canadian technology manufacturer specializing in connectivity parts for the information technology and professional audiovisual industries. StarTech.com services a worldwide market with operations throughout the United States, Canada, Europe, Latin America, and Taiwan. The company headquarters is located in London, Ontario with other distribution centers in the United States, Canada, the United Kingdom, and Japan.

== History ==
=== Founding ===
StarTech.com was founded in 1985 in London, Ontario, Canada by Paul Seed and Ken Kalopsis. The company's first products were anti-glare screens for CRT computer monitors and keyboard dust covers.

=== International expansion ===
Although StarTech.com had been active in the Canadian and United States IT markets since the company's beginning, in 2004 the company expanded to Northampton, UK. In 2010 the company further expanded its UK operation with the appointment of a Business Manager, UK Country Manager, and National Account Manager. In the same year, both the UK and USA warehouses were relocated to better accommodate demand for products. By 2012, StarTech.com had begun the sale of products in many European and American markets, including those in France, Spain, Italy, and Benelux, as well as Mexico. In 2019, StarTech.com was selling in 23 countries worldwide and had plans for further expansion.

== Products and services ==
StarTech.com's product range includes adapters, converters, connectors, extenders, splitters, and switches. The company's products are divided into 8 main categories: Audio/Video Products, Electrical Cables, Server Management, Hard Drive Accessories, Expansion Cards, Networking Products, Computer Parts, and Laptop/Notebook Docking Stations & USB Hubs.
