= Chaintech =

Taiwanese computer hardware manufacturer

Chaintech Technology Corporation
- Native name: 承啟科技股份有限公司
- Type: Public
- Traded as: TWSE: 2425
- Industry: Computer hardware
- Founded: November 17, 1986
- Headquarters: New Taipei, Taiwan
- Products: Motherboards, graphics cards, all-in-one computers
- Number of employees: 266
- Website: www.chaintech.com.tw

Chaintech Technology Corporation (Chinese: 承啟科技股份有限公司), formerly known as Chaintech Computer Co., Ltd. and later Walton Chaintech Corporation, is a Taiwanese computer hardware manufacturer founded in November 1986. Headquartered in New Taipei, the company is historically best known for its motherboards and graphics cards.

== History ==
Chaintech former logo

Chaintech was established on 17 November 1986 in Taiwan and began as a manufacturer of motherboards for IBM-compatible personal computers. During the 1990s and early 2000s the company expanded distribution channels in Asia, Europe, Australia and North America.

In 2000, the company was listed on the Taiwan Stock Exchange (TSE: 2425). In 2005, it formed a strategic alliance with the integrated circuit packaging and testing company Huadong Technology, changing its name to Walton Chaintech Corporation and becoming part of the PSA Huake business group. At this time, the company also began producing memory modules.

Facing intense competition and industry consolidation, Chaintech officially exited the mainstream motherboard and graphics card markets in 2006. Same year, Chaintech established an EMS division, expanding into OEM manufacturing.

After several years of reduced activity following its 2006 exit, Walton Chaintech announced in June 2012 that it would return to the motherboard and graphics card markets. The company partnered with Chinese graphics card vendor Colorful to gradually re-enter the market, fulfilling OEM orders and planning to resume its own branding business by 2013.

In subsequent years the company reorganized and updated its corporate name to Chaintech Technology Corporation. The logo has been updated to a bilingual design, reflecting the company’s focus on the China's market.

== Products and markets ==
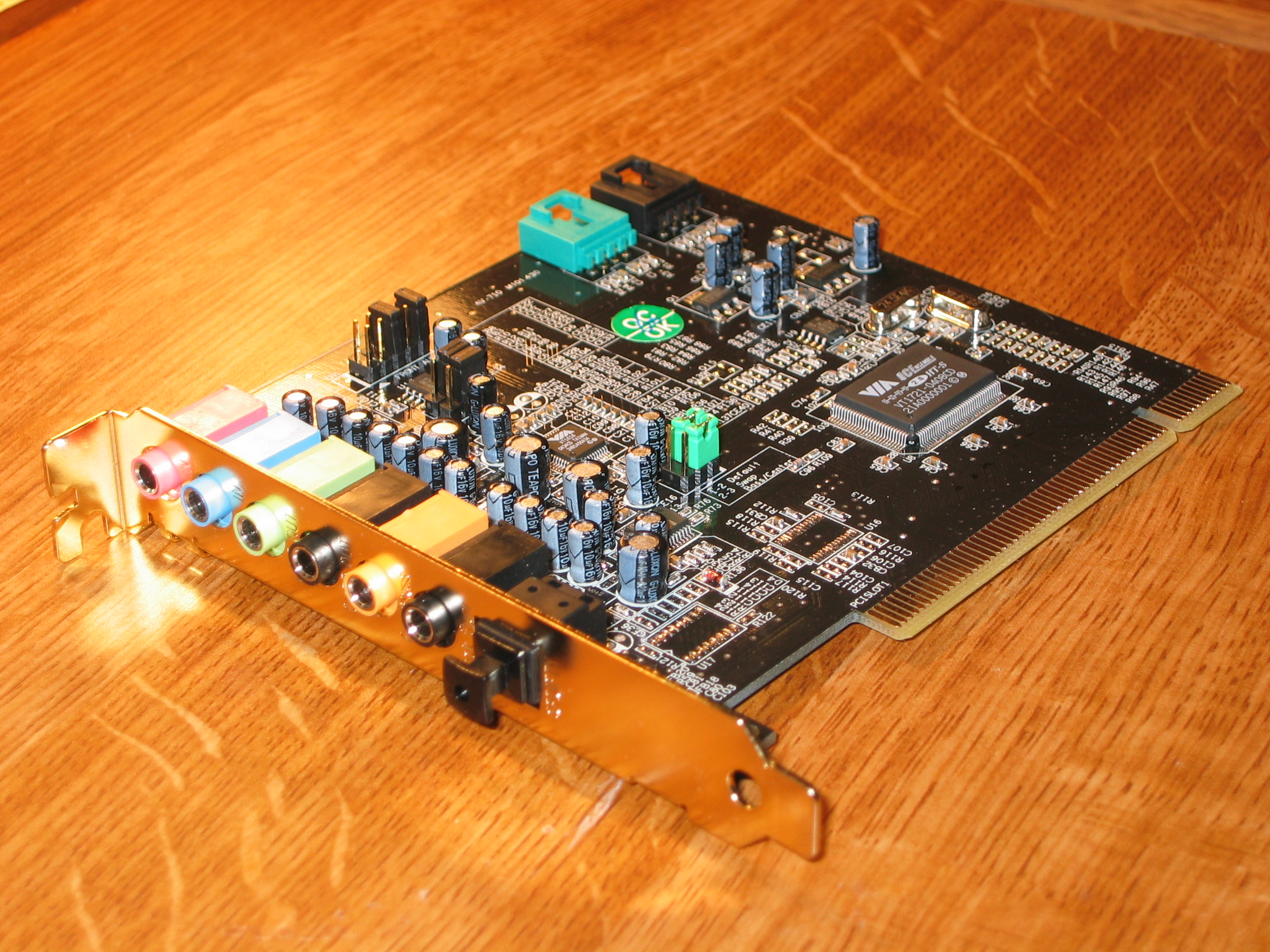
A Chaintech AV-710 sound card based on the VIA Envy chipset

Historically Chaintech produced motherboards and graphics cards. Its portfolio also included sound cards, modems, memory modules and other PC peripherals. The company sold both under the Chaintech/Walton Chaintech brand and through OEM/ODM arrangements for other vendors and regional markets.

After its 2012 announcement to re-enter the motherboard and graphics card markets, Chaintech focused on strategic partnerships and regional distribution primarily within China and selected overseas markets. The company's more recent products includes AI server products and all-in-one computers.
