= Noctua (company) =

Austrian computer hardware manufacturer

- Company type: Private
- Industry: Computer hardware
- Founded: 2005; 21 years ago
- Headquarters: Vienna, Austria
- Key people: Roland Mossig (CEO)
- Products: Computer cooling
- Website: noctua.at

Noctua is an Austrian computer hardware manufacturer of CPU coolers and computer fans. The company is named after Athene noctua, the scientific name for the little owl, a symbol of wisdom and intelligence in Greek mythology, which is also represented in its logo.

== Product range ==
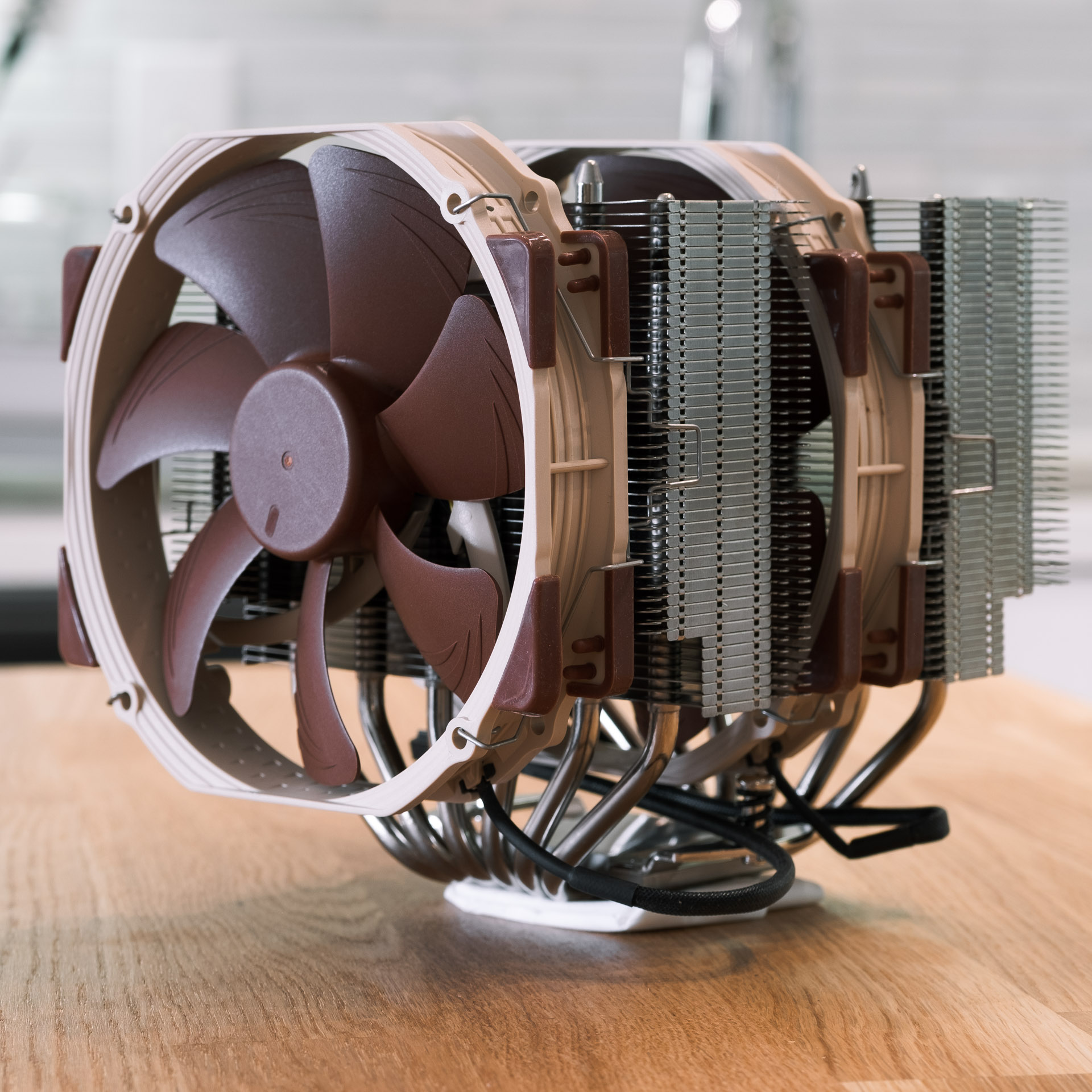
The Noctua NH-D15 CPU cooler in Noctua's brown and beige colour scheme

Noctua offers products such as CPU coolers, computer fans, thermal compounds, solutions for industrial applications, and collaborative offerings like graphics cards.

A unique aspect of Noctua's computer fan products is their signature brown and beige color scheme. However, this color choice has elicited mixed opinions within the customer and enthusiast community; the color palette has faced criticism with PC Gamer characterizing it as a "khaki-and-mud color scheme straight out of the '70s".

=== Collaborative ventures ===
In October 2021, Noctua partnered with Asus to release a Noctua-branded Nvidia GeForce RTX 3070 graphics processing unit (GPU) featuring Noctua cooling technology. Further collaboration between Noctua and Asus for graphics card offerings was confirmed in March 2022. By 2025 there's been an RTX 3070, 3080, 4070, 4080, 4080 Super and 5080 Noctua Edition. In 2021, Noctua also partnered with mechanical keyboard manufacturer Drop to create a keycap set, along with a desk mat and coiled aviator cable.

In 2023, Noctua partnered with Linus Media Group to release a branded screwdriver featuring Noctua's color scheme. Then, in 2025, they partnered with Seasonic to release a 1600W power supply unit featuring Noctua's color scheme.

== See also ==
- Computer cooling
- Quiet PC
