= Targus (company) =

Computer accessories company

- Company type: Private company
- Industry: Mobile computing accessories
- Founded: 1983; 42 years ago
- Founder: Neil Bruce-Copp
- Headquarters: Anaheim, California, United States
- Area served: Worldwide
- Key people: Mikel Williams (CEO)
- Owner: TGHI, Inc.
- Website: www.targus.com

Targus is a privately owned multinational mobile computing accessories company that designs, manufactures, and sells laptop and tablet cases, computer accessories such as mice, keyboards, and privacy screens, as well as universal docking stations. Targus released the world's first laptop case in 1983.

Targus employs approximately 500 people globally. Mikel H. Williams is CEO and chairman.

== Overview ==
Targus was founded in Barnes, London in 1983 by Neil Bruce-Copp, after he invented the world's first personal computer carrying case and secured orders from IBM and ICL to fund Targus Group. In 1986, Targus launched its first laptop case, the T3100L, with a 250-unit order from Toshiba.

In 1995, Targus became known as Targus Group International and had offices in the US, Canada, Hong Kong, Taipei, Australia, and several more throughout Europe.

Targus opened its new headquarters in Anaheim, California in 2000. In 2004, Targus launched its first docking station, joined the Bluetooth marketplace, and developed the SafePort Air Protection System.

Early in 2005, Targus joined the mobile device market with a range of iPod accessories. Since 2015 Targus has been a Samsung and Google partner.

In 2016, Targus Group International filed for Chapter 11 bankruptcy protection with plans to liquidate its assets after an agreement with creditors.
