= Sea Sonic =

Taiwanese power supply manufacturer

Sea Sonic Electronics Co., Ltd.
- Native name: 海韻電子工業股份有限公司
- Type: Computer hardware, power supplies
- Founded: September 1975; 50 years ago
- Headquarters: Taipei, Taiwan
- Products: Computer power supply
- Website: www.seasonic.com

Sea Sonic Electronics Co., Ltd. (Chinese: 海韻電子工業股份有限公司; pinyin: hǎiyùn diànzǐ gōngyè gǔfèn yǒuxiàngōngsī), stylized as Seasonic, is a Taiwanese power supply and computer PSU manufacturer and retailer, formerly limited to trading hardware OEM for other companies. They first started making power supplies for the PC industry in the 1981. All of their PSUs are 80 Plus-certified.

In 2002, Sea Sonic established a wholly owned subsidiary in California to sell products in the US retail market and to provide technical support.

== History ==
- 1975 Sea Sonic incorporated to manufacture Electronic Test Equipment.
- 1981 Sea Sonic enters the PC power supply market
- 1984 Headquarters relocates to Shilin, Republic of China.
- 1986 The factory phases in Automated Test Equipment in production methodology, this is the first in switching power supply manufacturing in Taiwan.
- 1990 Second factory in Taoyuan County (now Taoyuan City), Taiwan begins operation.
- 1993 European office opens in The Netherlands.
- 1994 Dong Guan China I factory begins full operation.
- 1995 Sea Sonic develops an ATX power supply for the Pentium market.
- 1997 Dong Guan factory receives ISO9002 certification.
- 1998 The Dong Guan II factory begins full operation. Taiwan headquarters and Taoyuan factory receive ISO9001 certification.
- 1999 Headquarters relocates to present address at Neihu, Taipei.
- 2000 Dong Guan factory receives ISO 9001 certification. The first PSU maker to provide PC and IPC market cost-effective Active PFC (Power Factor Correction) solutions. Designs and applies S2FC (Smart & Silent Fan Control) towards PC and IPC products.
- 2002 USA office opens in California, USA. Sea Sonic Electronics Co., Ltd. lists on Taiwan's Gre Tai Securities Market (OTC Stock Exchange).
- 2003 Launched retail products with own brand name and won awards and recommendations worldwide.
- 2004 Dedicated to develop green and silent power supplies with higher efficiency and higher power output.
- 2005 The USA office was renamed as Sea Sonic Electronics Inc., a 100% Sea Sonic owned subsidiary, to serve North and South America customers. The first PSU manufacturer to win the 80 Plus efficiency certification.
- 2006 Dong Guan factory receives ISO14001 certification. Began to mass-produce RoHS & WEEE compliant products.
- 2008 European subsidiary opens in the Netherlands to serve the European market. Dong Guan Factory II begins full operation.
- 2009 Sea Sonic is first in the market to achieve 80 PLUS® Gold rating by introducing the X-Series power supplies.
- 2010 Sea Sonic introduces the world's first 80 PLUS® Gold rated fanless models to the worldwide retail market.
- 2011 The 80 PLUS® Platinum rated 860 W and 1000 W models get introduced.
- 2012 Japan subsidiary opens in Tokyo. The 80 PLUS® Platinum rated 400 W, 460 W, and 520 W ultra-silent fanless models enter the world market.
- 2013 The S12G 80 PLUS® Gold-, and the M12II EVO 80 PLUS® Bronze-rated power supplies get introduced.
- 2014 Sea Sonic launches the 80 PLUS® Platinum 1050 W and 1200 W, and the 80 PLUS® Gold X-Series 1050 W and 1250 W models.
- 2017 Under the 'One Seasonic' initiative, Sea Sonic revamps its entire product line to introduce the PRIME, FOCUS and CORE series.
- 2018 The Seasonic SCMD (system cable management device) marks the beginning of a new era for simplifying cable management.
- 2019 The Seasonic CONNECT system modernizes system installation and cable management.
- 2020 Sea Sonic partners with G2 Esports to enter the world of competitive gaming.
- 2021 The new Seasonic SYNCRO Q704 case wins both the 2021 Red Dot Award and the 2021 iF Design Award for excellent design.
- 2022 The Seasonic MagFlow Fan has won the 2022 Red Dot Design Award and the 2022 if Design Award for its innovative design.
- 2023 Sea Sonic receives ISO 14064-1:2018 certification for the quantification and reporting of greenhouse gas emissions and removals.
- 2026 Sea Sonic releases the PRIME ENTERPRISE RX-1600 which is the first ATX PSU to earn the 80 PLUS® Ruby Certification at 115 volts
