= DeepCool =

Chinese computer hardware company

Beijing DeepCool Industries Co., Ltd. 九州风神
- Trade name: DeepCool
- Industry: Computer hardware
- Founded: March 1996; 30 years ago
- Headquarters: Beijing, China
- Products: Computer cooling; Computer cases; Power supplies; Mousepad; Laptop cooler; Computer mouse; Computer keyboard
- Number of employees: 1,681
- Website: www.deepcool.com

DeepCool (Chinese: 九州风神) is a Chinese manufacturer of computer hardware headquartered in Beijing. Founded in 1996, the company produces computer cooling products, computer cases, power supplies and related peripherals. The company operates manufacturing facilities in Huizhou and distributes its products to more than 70 countries worldwide.

== History ==
Old logo used until January 11, 2020

DeepCool was founded in Beijing in 1996 with an initial focus on producing desktop and server coolers for original design manufacturer (ODM) partners. During the 2000s the company expanded from air coolers to include all-in-one liquid cooling systems and later diversified into PC cases and power supplies.

In 2020, DeepCool applied for an initial public offering on the ChiNext board of the Shenzhen Stock Exchange, but the application was rejected in 2022.

== Sanctions ==
In June 2024 the United States Department of Commerce added DeepCool to a sanctions list, alleging that the company supplied over US$1 million in computer hardware to Russian entities on the "Common High Priority List", potentially contributing to Russia's military capabilities in the war in Ukraine.
