= Leadtek =

Taiwanese computer hardware company

Leadtek Research, Inc.
- Company type: Public (TSEC: T2465)
- Industry: Computer hardware
- Founded: 24 October 1986; 39 years ago
- Headquarters: New Taipei, Taiwan
- Key people: K.S. Lu (President and Chairman)
- Products: WinFast series of video cards WinFast series of TV tuners for PCs; NSC 3600 series of video surveillance equipment
- Revenue: $169.9 million USD (2003)
- Number of employees: over 498
- Website: www.leadtek.com/eng

Leadtek Research, Inc. (Chinese: 麗臺科技) is a Taiwanese company, founded in 1986, which focuses on research and development that is specialized in the design and manufacture of graphics cards.

== Products ==
Products in Leadtek's Computer Group include 3D graphics accelerators (of the NVIDIA GeForce line, mainstream and workstation-class). Currently, Leadtek's product lines are covering computer gaming graphics cards, workstation graphics cards, AI software and hardware, AI cloud supercomputing workstations, desktop virtualization Zero Client/Thin Client, smart medical/health care, school research and big data.

In 2019, Leadtek acquired the world-renowned oximeter brand Alvital. Through non-invasive, fast, and accurate measurement of blood oxygen saturation (SpO2) and pulse rate, its oximeters gained recognition and were purchased by governments during the COVID-19 pandemic. The brand also obtained international medical certifications, including FDA (USA), PMDA (Japan), and TFDA (Taiwan), aiding countries severely affected by COVID-19. This contributed to a gradual increase in Leadtek's revenue from its medical business in recent years. In 2023, Leadtek launched a home sleep monitoring service, offering market-oriented solutions and sleep screening services to address the needs of individuals with insomnia. This initiative aims to solve the pain points of the insomnia population, further expanding Leadtek's footprint in the healthcare market.

== History ==
=== Key dates ===
- 1997
  Pioneer of GPS products since 1997 (one of Taiwan's earliest).
- 2000
  Leadtek GPS module became “de facto” Smart Antenna.
  module (9531) SiRF Star I GPS module (9520).
- 2001
  Mini size GPS antenna for PDA application .
  9532 Smart Antenna.
  9540/9542/9543 SS-2 module.
- 2002
  9543LP module/ 9546 SiRFXtrac module .
  9546 SiRFXtrac module.
  9534 CF card receiver.
- 2003
  9551 SD card receiver.
  9547 SiRFLoc/ SiRFXtrac module.
  9800 2t host-based module .
  First Bluetooth GPS Receiver 9537-SiRF Star II.
- 2004
  First GPS receiver (9553)-SiRF Star III chipset.
  First SMD module (9548)-SiRF Star III chipset.
  First tiny Bluetooth GPS Receiver 9553.
  SiRF Star II SMD module (9805).
  First GPS receiver with RDS/TMC function (9815) to European market.
- 2005
  All-in-one GPS Navigator (9700)-Win CE4.0 platform.
- 2006
  9101LP/9548SLP/9552LP module (SiRF Star III).
  9805ST/9540G/9121/9122 module (SiRF Star II).
  9500EVK evaluation kit.
  9559X Bluetooth GPS receiver.
- 2007
  9450 GPS Smart Antenna.
  9569 Bluetooth GPS receiver.
  9750/9752 PND (Personal Navigation Device).
- 2008
  LR 8M03 LBS Tracker.
- 2016
  Cooperated with the Canadian Nano Research company to develop “NewClean long effect nano-spray”.
- 2017
  Leadtek became a certified partner of NVIDIA DLI (Deep Learning Institute) and started AI talent training course.
- 2019
  Leadtek was awarded " Taiwan i sports (Certificate of Corporate Wellness) " by Sports Administration, Ministry of Education
- 2020
  H2 Plus Wearable ECG Recorder won the 29th Taiwan Excellence Award (2021)
- 2021
  Leadtek workstations have been validated by NVIDIA as NVIDIA-Certified Systems
- 2022
  Leadtek has been certified by three international management systems: SGS ISO 27001 (information security), ISO 27017 (cloud service information security) and ISO 27701 (privacy information), providing customers with system information security, cloud security and personal information security.
- 2023
  Leadtek Launched the 8D52 wearable blood oxygen monitor, which integrates blood oxygen and heart rate monitoring.

== See also ==
- List of companies of Taiwan
