= Be quiet! =

German computer hardware company

be quiet!
- Company type: GmbH
- Industry: Computer hardware industry
- Founded: 2002; 24 years ago
- Headquarters: Glinde, Schleswig-Holstein, Germany
- Products: Computer power supply PC cases PC cooling solutions
- Website: bequiet.com

be quiet! is a German computer hardware brand owned by Listan GmbH, which manufactures power supply units, CPU coolers, computer cases and case fans. The main target groups for products in the be quiet! range are PC enthusiasts and computer game players as well as system integrators. The company's headquarters is in Glinde, close to Hamburg. At present, the firm also has branches in Poland, China and Taiwan. The products of be quiet! are directly sold from Glinde to distributors and resellers worldwide. However, the major market of the be quiet! brand is Europe.

== History ==
The be quiet! trademark was registered in 2002 by Listan GmbH. Initially only PC power supplies equipped with noise-minimizing technology were marketed under the brand name. From 2008, it was decided to add products for the cooling of PCs (CPU coolers and case fans) to the be quiet! range in addition to power supplies. In 2014, be quiet! added PC cases to the product portfolio.

The readers of the German computer magazine PC Games Hardware elected be quiet! "Manufacturer of the Year" in the PSU category. Also, in the election of the leading German online magazine Hardwareluxx, be quiet! was chosen by the readers as "Manufacturer of the Year" in the PSU category. According to regular studies by the GfK Group, based on the numbers of units sold, be quiet! is consistently concluded as a market leader in Germany for PC power supplies, from 2006 to their latest study in 2017.

== Products ==
The organizational, administrative and logistics work as well as technical development of be quiet! products are performed at the headquarters in Germany. This includes inspiration, product conception and design in addition to the final quality control.

In line with its brand name, the development of all products in the be quiet! range converge on the goal of minimizing noise. To achieve this, the company has developed a selection of its own technologies and registered patents.

=== Power supply units ===
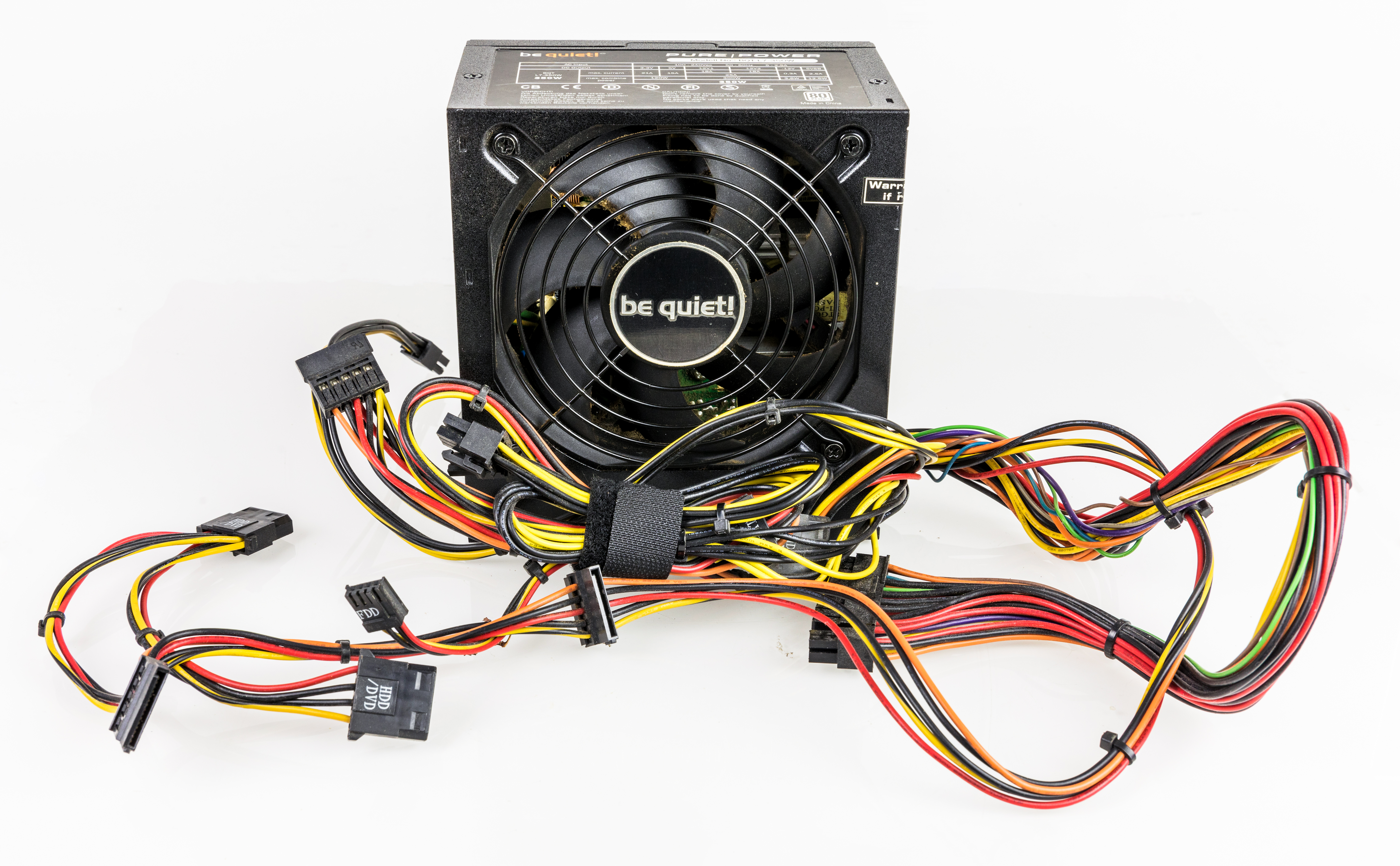
be quiet! BQT L7-350W ATX power supply unit

The main focus of be quiet! PC power supply products is the ATX format. However, the brand now also produces power supplies for SFX and TFX systems. The power supplies manufactured cover a spectrum of power classes from 300W to 1600W, focusing on high-end PC components.

=== PC cases ===
In August 2014, the brand be quiet! introduced its first mid-tower PC case Silent Base 800 to the market and since then introduced three further product series (Dark Base, Pure Base and Shadow Base).

=== CPU cooler and case fans ===
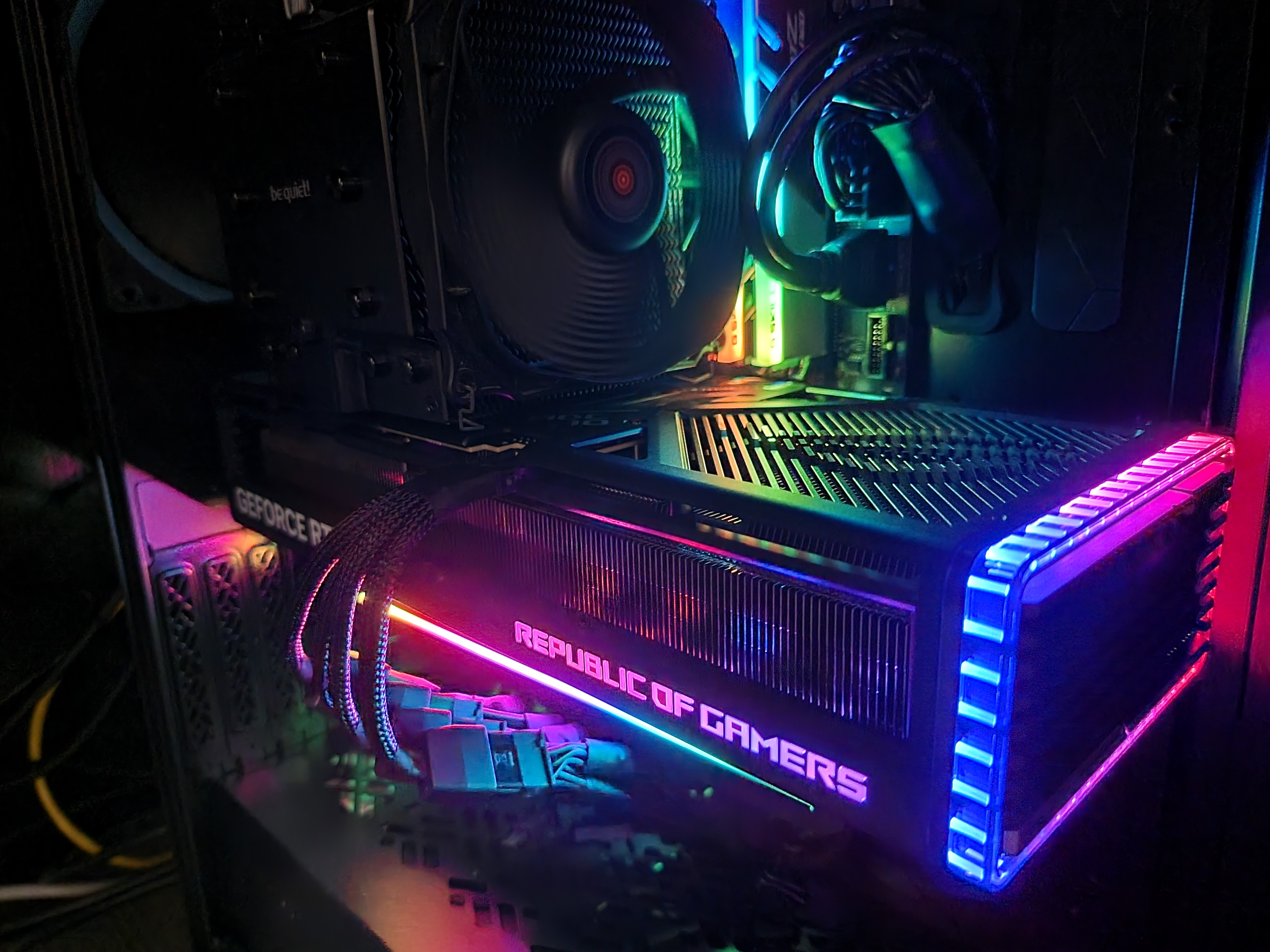
be quiet! Dark Rock Pro 4 CPU cooler installed within a PC

In 2008, be quiet! extended its product palette with CPU coolers in tower, dual tower and top flow architectures. In addition, case fan models were produced with and without the PWM function in mounting sizes from 80 to 140 millimeters. In 2015, the be quiet! Pure Wings 2 case fan series won the European Hardware Awards, an annual selection of the very best hardware products available in the European market. In 2016, be quiet! extended its CPU cooler range with water coolers, in 240, 280 and 360mm formats.

== Patents and utility models ==
For the technology it developed itself between 2009 and 2011, the company has lodged several registered designs and patents in diverse regions and countries. These all share the aim: Reduction of noise in addition to optimizing the operation in cooling and power supply components. One example is the "technology of aerodynamically optimized surface texture" as used in other industrial applications to reduce operational noise and improve airflow. This technology is applied to all be quiet! fans. The case fan series Silent Wings 2 and Shadow Wings have a further example of patented technology known as "anti-vibration mounts" that not only simplify the fitting and dampen the overall vibration, but also offer a flexible choice of mounting according to application. Another such technology is known as the "fan damping assembly", that reduces vibration with a rubber seal, simplifies the fitting procedures, and so significantly reduces the assembly time needed. In addition, the company has registered another invention for a "device to anchor the fan" on the CPU cooler as a utility model. This facilitates the fitting, because the device clamps easily to the exterior of the heat sink. The bracing against the heat sink serves to absorb the fan vibrations well and so inhibits the generation of noise. The company also has a registered utility model for the "connector angular setting" for the cables of its power supply products. This special technology enables the setting and adjustment of the outlet cable angle, to suit the installation sites in differing PC configurations. This makes for tidy routing of the cables and improves the air circulation in the casing.
