= CaseLabs =

California's computer case manufacturer

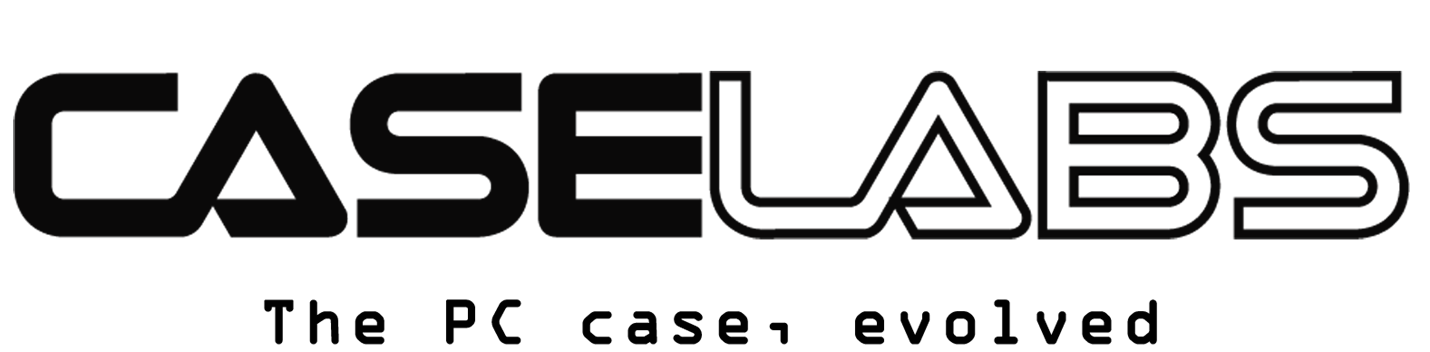
- Industry: Computer hardware
- Founded: 1971; 55 years ago in California, United States
- Defunct: August 2018; 8 years ago
- Fate: Bankruptcy
- Products: Computer cases
- Website: https://caselabs.se/

CaseLabs was the trade name used by the now defunct CFC California Fabrication Inc (based in Canoga Park, Los Angeles, California) for their consumer computer case business. The company was founded in 1971 as a manufacturer of computer cases for electronic, military, medical, and industrial applications, and started making cases for the consumer market in late 2010.

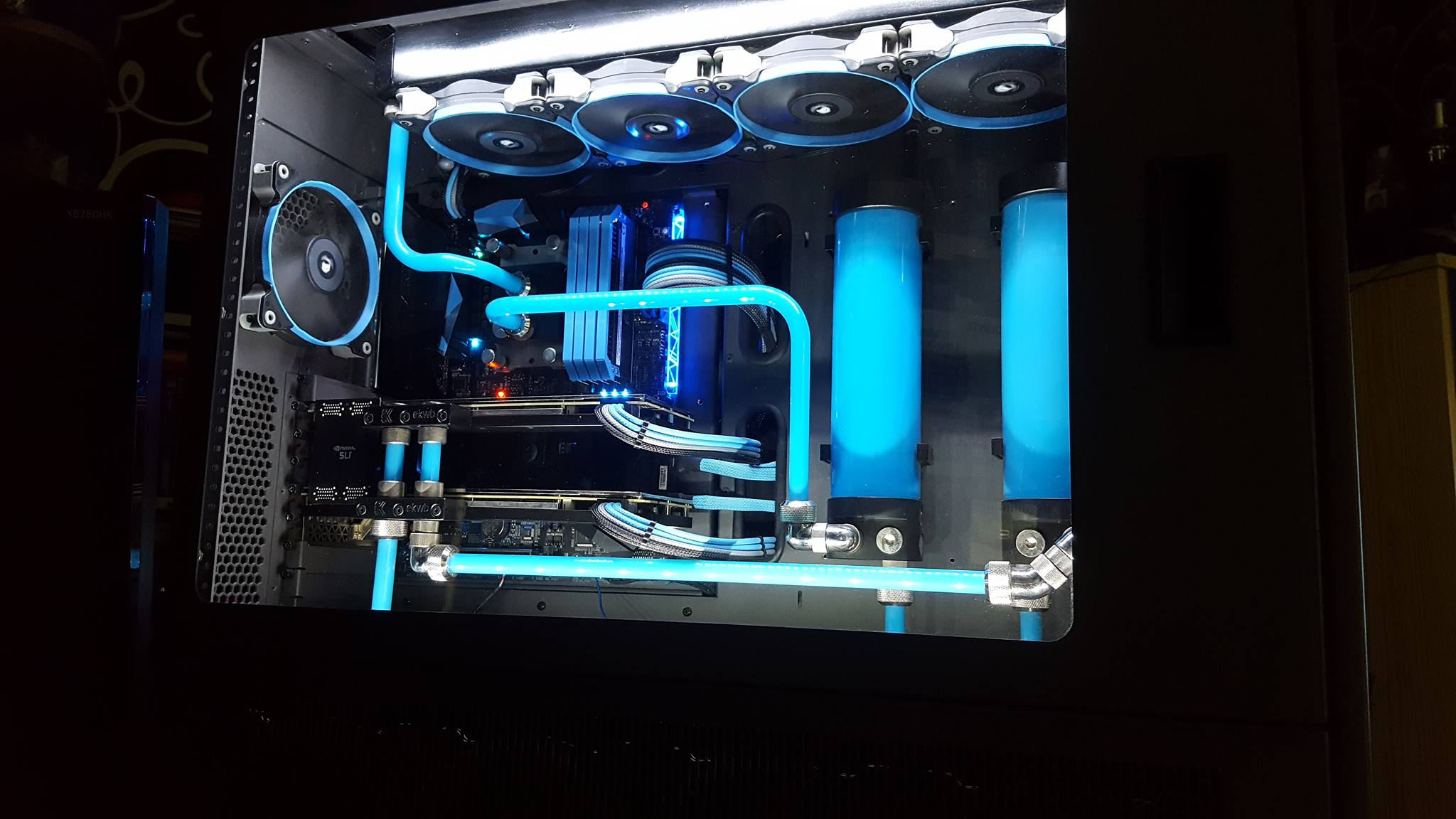
A watercooled computer inside a CaseLabs SMA8 case

CaseLabs allowed buyers to customize their purchases from their website by offering factory options. The company's cases used aluminum construction and were noted for their ability to house multiple radiators for liquid cooling.

CaseLabs announced that it was shutting down permanently in August 2018, citing the first Trump tariffs cutting into margins by "raising prices by almost 80%", and the "default of a large account". The company said it would not be able to fulfill all existing orders, but parts orders should ship to customers.

== New Ownership ==
On October 2, 2021, popular PC gaming news outlet GamersNexus reported the intellectual property of the bankrupt CaseLabs brand had been sold to a new owner.

At some point in the future, we would love to design brand new case models. However, our current plan regarding cases is to start by selling spare parts, followed by the original line of cases. After that, our focus will be on updating the original line-up of cases to revision A with updated front I/O, vertical GPU bracket support and so on. And we have heard you: A small form factor case could see the light of day sometime in the future.

== Products ==
=== Discontinued ===
==== PC cases ====
- SMA8, full tower with basement
- TH10, double width full tower with basement and optional hat
- TX10-D, double width full tower with (semi-double) basement, loft and extended hat

Year 2015 or later versions of above cases are under Magnum (model line)

- Bullet
  - BH8, horizontal E-ATX, 2 inch taller to allow for thicker water cooling radiators, successor of BH7
  - BH7, horizontal ATX
  - BH4, SFF horizontal matx
  - BH2, SFF horizontal mITX
