= List of companies of Taiwan =

Location of Taiwan and nearby islands

Taiwan is a stable industrial economy as a result of economic growth and industrialization during the late 20th century, often referred to as one of the Four Asian Tigers along with Hong Kong, Singapore and South Korea. It is a member of both the World Trade Organization and the Asia-Pacific Economic Cooperation under various names due to its ambiguous political status. As the 20th largest economy in the world as of 2023, its high-tech industry plays a key role in the global economy.

== Largest firms ==
This list shows firms in the Fortune Global 500, which ranks firms by total revenues reported before January 2026.

Largest firms in Taiwan
Rank	Image	Name	2025 revenues (US$M)	Employees	Notes
28		Hon Hai Precision Industry (Foxconn)	213,699	633,167	World's largest contract electronics manufacturer and the fourth-largest information technology company (by revenue). The firm operates as a contract manufacturer and subsidiaries include the Sharp Corporation and Smart Technologies.
126		Taiwan Semiconductor Manufacturing Company (TSMC)	90,167	83,825	World's largest dedicated independent semiconductor foundry. Subsidiaries include SSMC in Singapore.
348		Quanta Computer	43,949	65,926	Largest manufacturer of notebook computers in the world.
461		Pegatron	35,058	98,202	Electronics manufacturing company developing computing, communications and consumer electronics. Spun off from Asus. Subsidiaries include ASRock and Unihan Corporation.
494		CPC	32,769	16,637	State-owned petroleum company
496		Wistron	32,688	42,091	Electronics manufacturing company developing computing, communications and consumer electronics. Spun off from Acer Inc.. Subsidiaries include AOpen and Wiwynn.

== Notable firms ==
This list includes notable companies with primary headquarters located in the country. The industry and sector follow the Industry Classification Benchmark taxonomy. Organizations which have ceased operations are included and noted as defunct.

Notable companies Status: P=Private, S=State; A=Active, D=Defunct
Name	Industry	Sector	Headquarters	Founded	Notes	Status	
50 Lan	Consumer services	Beverages	Tainan	1994	Bubble tea and other beverages	P	A
85 °C Bakery Cafe	Consumer services	Beverages	Taichung	2004	Coffee shop & bakery	P	A
A.mart	Consumer services	Diversified retail	New Taipei City	1990	Supermarkets, owned by Far Eastern Group	P	A
A4Tech	Technology	Computer hardware	New Taipei City	1987	Computer accessories	P	A
AAEON	Technology	Computer hardware	Taipei	1992	Computer and peripheral equipment, owned by Asus	P	A
Accton Technology Corporation	Technology	Telecommunications equipment	Hsinchu	1988	Networking equipment	P	A
Acer Inc.	Technology	Computer hardware	New Taipei City	1976	Computer and peripheral equipment	P	A
ADATA	Technology	Computer hardware	New Taipei City	2001	Memory and storage	P	A
ADI Corporation	Technology	Computer hardware	Taipei	1979	Defunct 2006	P	D
ADLINK	Technology	Computer hardware	Taipei	1995	Computer and peripheral equipment	P	A
Adly	Consumer goods	Automobiles	Chiayi	1978	Scooters	P	A
Aeon Motor	Consumer goods	Automobiles	Tainan	1970	ATVs, scooters and mini-bikes	P	A
Aerospace Industrial Development Corporation	Industrials	Aerospace & defense	Taichung	1969	Aerospace research and engineering	P	A
AG Neovo	Technology	Computer hardware	Taipei	1978	Imaging and display devices	P	A
AIPTEK	Technology	Computer hardware	Hsinchu	1997	Imaging and display devices, cameras	P	A
Airiti Inc.	Consumer services	Publishing	Taipei	2000	Publishing, database, indexing, ebooks, online bookstore, wine	P	A
Albatron Technology	Technology	Computer hardware	New Taipei	1984	Graphics cards	P	A
Alchip	Technology	Semiconductors	Taipei	2003		P	A
ALi Corporation	Technology	Semiconductors	Taipei	1987	Defunct 2006, acquired by Nvidia (USA)	P	D
Alleycat's Pizza	Consumer services	Restaurants & bars	Taipei	2004	Restaurant chain	P	A
An Feng Steel	Basic materials	Iron & steel	Kaohsiung	1986	Iron and steel	P	A
Andes Technology	Technology	Semiconductors	Hsinchu	2005		P	A
Antec	Technology	Computer hardware	Taipei	1986	Computer cases & accessories	P	A
AOC International	Technology	Computer hardware	Taipei	1934	Imaging and display devices	P	A
AOpen	Technology	Computer hardware	Taipei	1996	Computer and peripheral equipment, owned by Acer Inc.	P	A
Apacer	Technology	Computer hardware	Taipei	1997	Memory and storage	P	A
Arphic Technology	Technology	Software	New Taipei City	1990	Type foundry	P	A
ASE Group	Technology	Semiconductors	Kaohsiung	1984	Semiconductor assembly, packaging and testing	P	A
Asia Cement Corporation	Industrials	Cement	Taipei	1957	Cement	P	A
ASIX	Technology	Semiconductors	Hsinchu	1995		P	A
ASRock	Technology	Computer hardware	Taipei	2002	Computer and peripheral equipment	P	A
Asus	Technology	Computer hardware	Taipei	1989	Computer and peripheral equipment	P	A
ATEN International	Technology	Computer hardware	New Taipei City	1979	Computer accessories	P	A
ATP Electronics	Technology	Computer hardware	Taipei	1991	Memory and storage	P	A
AUO Corporation	Industrials	Electronic components & equipment	Hsinchu	1996	Optoelectronics, display panels	P	A
AVer Information	Technology	Computer hardware	New Taipei City	1990	Computer accessories, video conferencing equipment	P	A
Avision	Technology	Computer hardware	Hsinchu	1991	Imaging and display devices	P	A
Bafang Dumpling	Consumer services	Restaurants & bars	Taipei	1998	Restaurant chain	P	A
Bank of Kaohsiung	Financials	Banks	Kaohsiung	1982	Banking	P	A
Bank of Taiwan	Financials	Banks	Taipei	1897	Banking, owned by Taiwan Financial Holdings Group	S	A
Bank SinoPac	Financials	Banks	New Taipei City	1992	Banking	P	A
Behavior Tech Computer	Technology	Computer hardware	New Taipei City	1982	Computer accessories	P	A
BenQ	Consumer goods	Consumer electronics	Taipei	2001	Cell phones, TVs, display devices	P	A
Billion Electric	Technology	Telecommunications equipment	Taipei	1973	Telecommunications equipment	P	A
Biostar	Technology	Computer hardware	New Taipei City	1986	Computer and peripheral equipment	P	A
Bit Corporation	Technology	Software	Taipei	1984	Gaming, defunct 1992	P	D
C.C.P Contact Probes	Industrials	Electrical components & equipment	New Taipei City	1986	Connectors	P	A
C-Media	Technology	Computer hardware	Taipei	1991	Sound card	P	A
C&E	Technology	Software	Taipei	1990	Gaming	P	A
Cathay Life Insurance	Financials	Insurance	Taipei	1962	Life insurance, owned by Cathay Financial Holdings	P	A
Cathay United Bank	Financials	Banks	Taipei	1975	Banking, owned by Cathay Financial Holdings	P	A
Central Bank of the Republic of China (Taiwan)	Financials	Banks	Taipei	1924	State-owned central bank	S	A
Century Development Corporation	Industrials	Construction	Taipei	1993	State-owned heavy construction engineering	S	A
Chaintech	Technology	Computer hardware	Taipei	1986	Graphics and sound card	P	A
Chang Hwa Bank	Financials	Banks	Taichung	1905	Banking	P	A
Chatime	Consumer services	Beverages	Zhubei	2005	Bubble tea and other beverages	P	A
Cheng Shin Rubber	Chemicals	Specialty chemicals	Yuanlin	1967	Rubber	P	A
Chi Mei Corporation	Chemicals	Specialty chemicals	Tainan	1960	Plastics	P	A
Chiahui Power Corporation	Utilities	Conventional electricity	Chiayi County	1996	Electricity, owned by Far Eastern Group	P	A
Chicony Electronics	Technology	Computer hardware	Taipei	1983	Computer and peripheral equipment, cameras	P	A
China Airlines	Consumer services	Airlines	Taoyuan	1959	State-owned airline	S	A
China Motor Corporation	Consumer goods	Automobiles	Taipei	1969	Automobiles, commercial vehicles, Mitsubishi Motors (Japan) & MG Motor (China), owned by Yulon Motor	P	A
China Steel	Basic materials	Iron & steel	Kaohsiung	1971	Iron and steel	P	A
Chingwin Publishing Group	Consumer services	Publishing	Taipei	1964	Publishing	P	A
Chroma ATE	Industrials	Electronic components & equipment	Taoyuan	1984	Testing equipment and automation system	P	A
Chun Shui Tang	Consumer services	Beverages	Taichung	1983	Bubble tea and other beverages	P	A
Chun Yuan Steel	Basic materials	Iron & steel	Taipei	1965	Iron and steel	P	A
Chunghwa Post	Transportation	Delivery services	Taipei	1878	State-owned courier services	S	A
Chunghwa Telecom	Telecommunications	Fixed-line telecommunications	Taipei	1996	Communications and internet	P	A
Chuntex Electronic	Technology	Computer hardware	Taipei	1981	Imaging and display devices	P	A
CipherLab	Technology	Computer hardware	Taipei	1988	Imaging and display devices	P	A
Clevo	Technology	Computer hardware	Taipei	1983	Computer and peripheral equipment	P	A
CMC Magnetics	Technology	Computer hardware	Taipei	1978	Memory and storage	P	A
CNet Technology	Technology	Telecommunications equipment	Taipei	1989	Networking equipment	P	A
CoCo Fresh Tea & Juice	Consumer services	Beverages	Taipei	1997	Bubble tea and other beverages	P	A
Compal Electronics	Technology	Computer hardware	Taipei	1984	Computer and peripheral equipment	P	A
Continental Engineering Corporation	Industrials	Construction	Taipei	1945	Heavy construction engineering	P	A
Cooler Master	Technology	Computer hardware	New Taipei City	1992	Computer cases & accessories	P	A
Coretronic	Technology	Computer hardware	Hsinchu	1992	Imaging and display devices	P	A
CPC Corporation	Energy	Integrated oil & gas	Taipei	1946	State-owned petroleum, natural gas and gasoline exploration & production	S	A
CSBC Corporation	Industrials	Shipbuilding	Kaohsiung	1937	State-owned, civil & naval ships building	S	A
CTBC Bank	Financials	Banks	Taipei	1966	Banking, owned by CTBC Financial Holding	P	A
CTBC Financial Holding	Financials	Financial services	Taipei	1966	Banking, financial and related services	P	A
CyberLink	Technology	Software	New Taipei City	1996	Information services	P	A
D-Link	Technology	Telecommunications equipment	Taipei	1986	Telecommunications equipment	P	A
Daily Air	Consumer services	Airlines	Taipei	1992	Airline	P	A
DBTel	Telecommunications	Fixed-line telecommunications	Taipei	1979	Communications and internet	P	A
DelSolar	Industrials	Electronic components & equipment	Hsinchu	2004	Solar cells, modules	P	A
Delta Electronics	Industrials	Electronic components & equipment	Taipei	1971	Power electronics, industrial and building automation, LED lighting, medical devices	P	A
DFI	Technology	Computer hardware	New Taipei City	1981	Computer and peripheral equipment	P	A
Digital United	Telecommunications	Fixed-line telecommunications	Taipei	2000	Internet service provider	P	A
Din Tai Fung	Consumer services	Restaurants & bars	Taipei	1958	Restaurant chain	P	A
Dopod	Technology	Telecommunications equipment	New Taipei City	1997	Defunct 2007, acquired by HTC	P	D
DrayTek	Technology	Telecommunications equipment	Hsinchu	1997	Networking equipment	P	A
DronesVision	Industrials	Aerospace & defense	Keelung	2015	Drones and anti-drone systems	P	A
DTK Computer	Technology	Computer hardware	Taipei	1981	Defunct 2009	P	D
DynaComware	Technology	Software	Taipei	1987	Type foundry	P	A
E.SUN Commercial Bank	Financials	Banks	Taipei	1992	Banking	P	A
E-TEN	Consumer goods	Consumer electronics	Taipei	2001	Defunct 2008, acquired by Acer Inc.	P	D
Edimax	Technology	Telecommunications equipment	Taipei	1986	Networking equipment	P	A
Edison-Opto	Industrials	Electronic components & equipment	New Taipei City	2001	Optoelectronics	P	A
Elitegroup Computer Systems	Technology	Computer hardware	New Taipei City	1987	Computer and peripheral equipment	P	A
Epistar	Industrials	Electronic components & equipment	Hsinchu	1996	LED products	P	A
EPoX	Technology	Computer hardware	Taipei	1995	Defunct 2007	P	D
Eslite Bookstore	Consumer services	Specialty retail	Taipei	1989	Books store	P	A
Etron Technology, Inc.	Technology	Semiconductors	Taipei	1991		P	A
EVA Air	Consumer services	Airlines	Taoyuan	1989	Airline, owned by Evergreen Group	P	A
Ever Glory Publishing	Consumer services	Publishing	Tainan City	1991	Manga publishing	P	A
Evergreen Group	Conglomerate		Taipei	1975	Shipping, cargo, aviation, transportation, hotel	P	A
Ever Power IPP Co., Ltd.	Utilities	Conventional electricity	Taoyuan	1996	Electricity	P	A
Evergreen Marine	Industrials	Marine transportation	Taoyuan	1968	Shipping and cargo transportation, owned by Evergreen Group	P	A
Everlight Electronics	Industrials	Electronic components & equipment	New Taipei City	1983	LED products	P	A
EZTABLE	Technology	Consumer digital services	Taipei	2008	Online restaurant reservations	P	A
Far Eastern Group	Conglomerate		Taipei	1937	Energy, textile, cement, retail, financial, transportation, communication, construction, hotel	P	A
Far Eastern New Century	Basic materials	Textile products	New Taipei City	1942	Textile products, owned by Far Eastern Group	P	A
Far EasTone	Telecommunications	Mobile telecommunications	New Taipei City	1997	Mobile network, owned by Far Eastern Group	P	A
Faraday Technology	Technology	Semiconductors	Hsinchu	1993		P	A
FCF Co., Ltd.	Consumer goods	Food & beverage	Kaohsiung	1972	Seafood industry, largest tuna fish trader in the world	P	A
Feastogether	Consumer services	Restaurants & bars	Taoyuan	2002	Multi-brand restaurant operator	P	A
Federal Corporation	Consumer goods	Tires	Taoyuan	1954	Tires	P	A
First International Computer	Technology	Computer hardware	Taipei	1980	Computer and peripheral equipment	P	A
First International Telecom	Telecommunications	Mobile telecommunications	Taipei	1997	Defunct 2014	P	D
Formosa Automobile Corporation	Consumer goods	Automobiles	Taipei	1996	Commercial vehicles DAF Trucks (Netherlands), owned by Formosa Plastics Group	P	A
Formosa Chang	Consumer services	Restaurants & bars	Taipei	1960	Fast casual restaurant chain	P	A
Formosa Ha Tinh Steel	Basic materials	Iron & steel	Kaohsiung	1940	Iron and steel	P	A
Formosa Petrochemical	Energy	Oil refining & marketing	Yunlin County	1992	Petroleum refining & marketing	P	A
Formosa Plastics Corp	Chemicals	Specialty chemicals	Kaohsiung	1954	Plastics, owned by Formosa Plastics Group	P	A
Formosa Plastics Group	Conglomerate		Kaohsiung	1954	Petroleum, electronics, biotechnology, power generation	P	A
Formosa Television	Consumer services	Media	Taipei	1996	Media agency	P	A
Foxconn	Technology	Electronics	New Taipei City	1974	OEM/ODM	P	A
FSP Group	Technology	Computer hardware	Taoyuan	1993	Power supply	P	A
Fubon Financial Holding Co.	Financials	Financial services	Taipei	2001	Banking, financial and related services	P	A
Funtech	Consumer goods	Consumer electronics	Taipei	1983	Defunct 1998	P	D
FUNTORO	Industrials	Electronic components & equipment	New Taipei	2008	Automotive electronics, owned by Micro-Star International	P	A
G.Skill	Technology	Computer hardware	Taipei	1989	Memory and storage	P	A
Gainward	Technology	Computer hardware	Taipei	1984	Graphics card, owned by Palit Microsystems	P	A
Gamania	Technology	Software	New Taipei City	1995	Gaming	P	A
Getac	Technology	Computer hardware	Taipei	1989	Rugged computer and peripheral equipment	P	A
Giant Bicycles	Consumer goods	Recreational products	Taichung	1972	Bicycles	P	A
Gigabyte Technology	Technology	Computer hardware	New Taipei City	1986	Computer and peripheral equipment	P	A
Global Unichip Corporation	Technology	Semiconductors	Hsinchu	1998		P	A
Gloria Material Technology Corp.	Basic materials	Iron & steel	Tainan	1993	Steel	P	A
Gogoro	Consumer goods	Automobiles	Taoyuan	1993	Electric smartscooters	P	A
Gold Apollo	Technology	Telecommunications equipment	New Taipei City	1995	Paging systems, transmitters, receivers, LED products	P	A
Gong Cha	Consumer services	Beverages	Kaohsiung	2006	Bubble tea and other beverages	P	A
HannStar Display Corporation	Industrials	Electronic components & equipment	Taipei	1998	Monitors, TVs, displays	P	A
HeySong Corporation	Consumer goods	Beverages	New Taipei City	1925	Alcoholic & non-alcoholic drinks, coffee	P	A
Hi-VAWT	Utilities	Alternative electricity	New Taipei	2005	Wind turbine power & solar power	P	A
HIM International Music	Consumer services	Entertainment	Taipei	1991	Music	P	A
Himax	Technology	Semiconductors	Tainan	2001		P	A
Hitron	Technology	Telecommunications equipment	Hsinchu City	1986	Networking equipment	P	A
Holtek	Technology	Semiconductors	Hsinchu	1983		P	A
Ho-Ping Power Company	Utilities	Conventional electricity	Xiulin	1997	Electricity	P	A
Horizon Yacht	Industrials	Yacht manufacturer	Kaohsiung	1987	Yachts and recreational craft	P	A
Hotai Motor	Consumer goods	Automobiles	Taipei	1947	Automobiles, commercial vehicles	P	A
HTC	Consumer goods	Consumer electronics	Xindian District, New Taipei City	1997	Cellphones and accessories	P	A
Hsin Tao Power Corporation	Utilities	Conventional electricity	Hsinchu	1998	Electricity	P	A
Hsin Tung Yang	Consumer goods	Food & beverage	Taipei	1972	Meat products	P	A
Hualien Media International	Consumer services	Media	Taipei	2014	Media agency	P	A
Hung Hua Construction	Industrials	Shipbuilding	Taichung	1990	Shipbuilder	P	A
Ichia Technologies	Technology	Electronics	New Taipei City		Printed circuit boards	P	A
I-Mei Foods	Consumer goods	Food & beverage	Taipei	1934	Dairy products, baked goods	P	A
Infortrend	Technology	Computer hardware	New Taipei City	1993	Memory and storage	P	A
Innodisk	Technology	Computer hardware	New Taipei City	2005	Memory and storage	P	A
InnoLux Corporation	Industrials	Electronic components & equipment	Zhunan	2003	OEM TFT-LCD panels	P	A
Inotera	Technology	Semiconductors	Taoyuan City	2003	Defunct 2016, acquired by Micron Technology (USA)	P	D
Inprocomm	Technology	Semiconductors	Hsinchu	2002	Defunct 2005, acquired by MediaTek	P	D
Insyde Software	Technology	Software	Taipei	1998	Firmware and engineering support services	P	A
Inventec	Technology	Computer hardware	Taipei	1975	Computer and peripheral equipment	P	A
In Win Development	Technology	Computer hardware	Taoyuan	1985	Computer cases & power supply	P	A
J&G Fried Chicken	Consumer services	Restaurants & bars	Taipei	1973	Restaurant chain	P	A
Jadever	Industrials	Electronic components & equipment	Taipei	1986	Scale manufacturing	P	A
Jade Yachts	Industrials	Yacht manufacturer	Kaohsiung	2004	Yachts and recreational craft	P	A
JMicron	Technology	Semiconductors	Hsinchu	2001		P	A
Johnson Yachts	Industrials	Yacht manufacturer	Kaohsiung	1987	Yachts and recreational craft	P	A
Jong Shyn Shipbuilding Company	Industrials	Shipbuilding	Kaohsiung	1973	Civil & naval ships building	P	A
Karmin international	Industrials	Shipbuilding	Taipei	1988	Security boat builder	P	A
Kdan Mobile	Technology	Software	Tainan	2009	Mobile applications	P	A
Kenda Rubber Industrial Company	Consumer goods	Tires	Yuanlin	1962	Tires	P	A
KGI Bank	Financials	Banks	Taipei	1992	Banking, owned by KGI Financial Holding	P	A
KGI Financial Holding	Financials	Financial services	Taipei	2001	Banking, financial and related services	P	A
KGI Life Insurance	Financials	Insurance	Taipei	1963	Life insurance, owned by KGI Financial Holding	P	A
Kinesis Industry	Consumer goods	Recreational products	Taichung	1989	Bicycles	P	A
King Car Group	Consumer goods	Food & beverage	Taipei	1979	Alcoholic & non-alcoholic drinks, coffee	P	A
Kingmax	Technology	Computer hardware	Hsinchu	1989	Memory and storage	P	A
KKBox	Technology	Software	Taipei	2004	Music applications	P	A
KLG	Consumer services	Restaurants & bars	Taichung	2000	Restaurant chain	P	A
KMC Chain Industrial	Consumer goods	General industry	Tainan	1977	Roller chains and bicycle chains manufacturer	P	A
Koos Group	Conglomerate		Taipei	1899	Banking, petrochemicals, electronics, cement, financial services, hospitality, real estate	P	A
Kuo Yuan Ye	Consumer goods	Food & beverage	Taipei	1867	Confectionery foods	P	A
Kuozui Motors	Consumer goods	Automobiles	Taipei	1955	Automobiles, commercial vehicles, joint venture of Hotai Motor, Toyota & Hino Motors (Japan)	P	A
KWorld	Technology	Computer hardware	New Taipei City	1999	Multimedia devices and peripheral equipment	P	A
KYE Systems	Technology	Computer hardware	Taipei	1983	Computer accessories	P	A
Kymco	Consumer goods	Automobiles	Kaohsiung	1963	ATVs, motorcycles and scooters	P	A
Land Bank of Taiwan	Financials	Banks	Taipei	1946	State-owned banking	S	A
Lanner Electronics	Technology	Computer hardware	New Taipei City	1986	Computer and peripheral equipment	P	A
Largan Precision	Industrials	Electronic components & equipment	Taichung	1987	Optoelectronics	P	A
Laya Burger	Consumer services	Restaurants & bars	Taoyuan	2002	Restaurant chain	P	A
Leadtek	Technology	Computer hardware	New Taipei City	1986	Graphics card	P	A
Lian Li	Technology	Computer hardware	Keelung	1983	Computer cases & accessories	P	A
Lite-On	Technology	Computer hardware	Taipei	1975	Computer and peripheral equipment	P	A
Liuli Gongfang	Industrials	Glass	New Taipei City	1987	Glass making	P	A
Louisa Coffee	Consumer services	Beverages	Taipei	2006	Coffee Shop	P	A
Lungteh Shipbuilding	Industrials	Shipbuilding	Yilan County, Taiwan	1979	Civil & naval Boat and ship fabricator	P	A
Luxgen	Consumer goods	Automobiles	Miaoli County	2009	Automobiles, owned by Yulon Motor	P	A
Macronix	Technology	Semiconductors	Taipei	1989		P	A
MAG InnoVision	Technology	Computer hardware	Taipei	1990	Imaging and display devices	P	A
Mai-Liao Power Corporation	Utilities	Conventional electricity	Mailiao	1996	Electricity, owned by Formosa Plastics Group	P	A
Mandarin Airlines	Consumer services	Airlines	Taipei	1991	Airline	P	A
Maxxis	Consumer goods	Tires	Yuanlin	1967	Tires	P	A
MediaTek	Technology	Semiconductors	Hsinchu	1997	SoCs, DSPs, PHY, wireless and other ICs	P	A
Meet Fresh	Consumer services	Restaurants & bars	New Taipei City	2007	Restaurant chain	P	A
Mega International Commercial Bank	Financials	Banks	Taipei	2002	Banking	P	A
Merida Bikes	Consumer goods	Recreational products	Yuanlin	1972	Bikes	P	A
Micro-Star International	Technology	Computer hardware	New Taipei City	1986	Computer and peripheral equipment	P	A
Microlife Corporation	Health care	Medical equipment	Taipei	1981	Digital meters & monitoring devices	P	A
Microtek	Technology	Computer hardware	Hsinchu	1980	Imaging and display devices	P	A
Miniwiz	Industrials	Support services	Taipei	2005	Upcycling	P	A
Mio Technology	Consumer goods	Consumer electronics	Taipei	2002	Cell phones, navigation devices	P	A
MIPRO	Technology	Telecommunications equipment	Chiayi	1995	Wireless microphone systems	P	A
Mirror Media	Consumer services	Media	Taipei	2016	Media agency	P	A
MiTAC	Technology	Computer hardware	Hsinchu	1982	Computer and peripheral equipment	P	A
Momo.com	Technology	Consumer digital services	Taipei	2004	E-commerce, subsidiary of Fubon Financial Holding Co.	P	A
Mosel Vitelic	Technology	Semiconductors	Hsinchu	1983		P	A
Moxa Technologies	Technology	Consumer digital services	Taipei	1987	Computing, cyber securities and networking solutions	P	A
MStar	Technology	Semiconductors	Hsinchu	2002	Defunct 2012, acquired by MediaTek	P	D
Muse Communication	Consumer services	Entertainment	Taipei	1992	Anime distributor	P	A
Nankang Rubber Tire	Consumer goods	Tires	Taipei	1959	Tires	P	A
NCSIST	Industrials	Aerospace & defense	Taoyuan City	1969	State-owned defense company	S	A
Neo Solar Power	Industrials	Electronic components & equipment	Hsinchu	2005	Solar cells, modules	P	A
Nuvoton	Technology	Semiconductors	Hsinchu	2008		P	A
OBI Pharma, Inc.	Health care	Pharmaceuticals	Taipei	2002		P	A
Ocean Alexander	Industrials	Yacht manufacturer	Kaohsiung	1977	Yachts and recreational craft	P	A
Palit Microsystems	Technology	Computer hardware	Taipei	1988	Graphics card	P	A
Pegatron	Technology	Electronics	Taipei	2007	OEM/ODM	P	A
Phalanx Biotech Group	Health care	Biotechnology	Hsinchu	2002		P	A
Phison	Technology	Computer hardware	Hsinchu	2000	Memory and storage	P	A
Phonic Corporation	Consumer goods	Consumer electronics	Taipei	1977	Audio electronics	P	A
Pinkoi	Technology	Consumer digital services	Taipei	2011	E-commerce	P	A
Plextor	Technology	Computer hardware	Taipei	1985	Defunct 2024, acquired by Kioxia (Japan)	P	D
Plustek	Technology	Computer hardware	Taipei	1986	Imaging and security devices	P	A
Pou Chen Corporation	Consumer goods	Footwear	Taichung	1969	Footwear	P	A
Powerchip	Technology	Semiconductors	Hsinchu	1994		P	A
PowerColor	Technology	Computer hardware	New Taipei	1997	Graphics card	P	A
Powertech Technology	Technology	Semiconductors	Taipei	2010	Semiconductor assembly, packaging and testing	P	A
Prince Motors	Consumer goods	Automobiles	Taipei	1965	Defunct 2011	P	D
Proton Electronic	Consumer goods	Consumer electronics	Taipei	1964	Radio electronics, TVs	P	A
PX Mart	Consumer services	Diversified retail	Taipei	1998	Supermarkets	P	A
QNAP Systems	Technology	Computer hardware	New Taipei City	2004	Memory and storage, networking equipment	P	A
Quanta Computer	Technology	Computer hardware	Taoyuan	1988	Computer and peripheral equipment	P	A
Quickly	Consumer services	Beverages	New Taipei City	1996	Bubble tea and other beverages	P	A
Ralink	Technology	Semiconductors	Hsinchu	2001	Owned by MediaTek	P	A
Realtek	Technology	Semiconductors	Hsinchu	1987	DSPs, PHY, wireless, audio and other ICs	P	A
Rebar	Conglomerate		New Taipei City	1960	Construction, banking, telecommunications, media	P	A
Republic of China Armoured Vehicle Development Center	Industrials	Defense	Taipei	1980	State-owned armored vehicles research and manufacturer	S	A
Ritek	Technology	Computer hardware	Hsinchu	1988	Memory and storage, display devices, solar modules	P	A
Rock Records	Consumer services	Entertainment	Taipei	1980	Music record labels	P	A
RSEA	Industrials	Construction	Taipei	1956	Defunct 2020	P	D
RT-Mart	Consumer services	Diversified retail	Taipei	1996	Supermarkets, owned by PX Mart	P	A
Runewaker Entertainment	Technology	Software	Taichung	2004	Gaming	P	A
Sampo Corporation	Consumer goods	Consumer electronics	Taoyuan City	1936	Home appliances, TVs	P	A
Sangean	Consumer goods	Consumer electronics	New Taipei City	1974	Radio electronics	P	A
Sanyang Motor	Consumer goods	Automobiles	Hsinchu	1954	ATVs, scooters and mini-bikes	P	A
Sea Sonic	Technology	Computer hardware	Taipei	1975	Power supply	P	A
Senao International	Consumer services	Specialty retail	Taipei	1979	Cell phones and accessories distributor, owned by Chunghwa Telecom	P	A
Senao Networks	Technology	Telecommunications equipment	Taipei	2006	Networking equipment	P	A
Seventeam Electronics	Technology	Computer hardware	Taipei	1986	Computer and peripheral equipment	P	A
Shanghai Commercial and Savings Bank	Financials	Banks	Taipei	1915	Banking	P	A
Sharp Point Press	Consumer services	Publishing	Taipei	1982	Manga, music publishing	P	A
Sheico	Consumer goods	Clothing & accessories	Wujie	1965	Watersports clothing, life saving apparel	P	A
Shiatzy Chen	Consumer goods	Clothing & accessories	Taipei	1978	Luxury goods	P	A
Shihlin Electric	Industrials	Electrical components & equipment	Taipei	1955	Electric machinery, automobile systems, transformer, system engineering	P	A
Shin Kong Group	Conglomerate		Taipei	1945	Textile, food, financials, healthcare, retail	P	A
Shin Kong Mitsukoshi	Consumer services	Diversified retail	Taipei	1972	Departmental store	P	A
Shinfox Energy	Utilities	Alternative electricity	New Taipei	2007	Wind turbine power	P	A
Shuttle Inc.	Technology	Computer hardware	Taipei	1983	Computer and peripheral equipment	P	A
Silicon Integrated Systems	Technology	Semiconductors	Hsinchu	1987		P	A
Silicon Power	Technology	Computer hardware	Taipei	2003	Memory and storage	P	A
Siliconware Precision Industries	Technology	Semiconductors	Taichung	1984	Semiconductor assembly, packaging and testing	P	A
Soft-World	Technology	Software	Taipei	1983	Gaming	P	A
SPARKLE Computer	Technology	Computer hardware	Taipei	1982	Graphics card, memory and storage	P	A
Starlux Airlines	Consumer services	Airlines	Taipei	2018	Airline	P	A
Sun Ba Power Corporation	Utilities	Conventional electricity	Taipei	2000	Electricity	P	A
SunComm Technology	Technology	Telecommunications equipment	New Taipei City	1977	GSM fixed wireless phones	P	A
Sunmerry Bakery	Consumer goods	Food & beverage	Taipei	1986	Confectionery foods	P	A
Super Flower	Technology	Computer hardware	New Taipei	1991	Computer cases & power supply	P	A
Synology Inc.	Technology	Computer hardware	Taipei	2000	Memory and storage	P	A
Synta Technology	Industrials	Electronic components & equipment	Taoyuan	1980	Optoelectronics, telescopes	P	A
Ta Ching Motor Co.	Consumer goods	Automobiles	Pingtung County	1986	Defunct 2002	P	D
Taichung Bank	Financials	Banks	Taichung	1953	Banking	P	A
Taipei Fubon Bank	Financials	Banks	Taipei	2005	Banking, owned by Fubon Financial Holding Co.	P	A
TCI Bio	Biotechnology	Biotechnology	Taipei	1980	Health supplements	P	A
TS Financial Holdings	Financials	Financial services	Taipei	2001	Banking, financial and related services	P	A
Taishin International Bank	Financials	Banks	Taipei	1992	Banking, owned by TS Financial Holdings	P	A
Taiwan Cement Corporation	Industrials	Cement	Taipei	1946	Cement	P	A
Taiwan Cooperative Bank	Financials	Banks	Taipei	1944	Banking	P	A
Taiwan Fertilizer	Chemicals	Fertilizers	Taipei	1946	State-owned fertilizers	S	A
Taiwan Financial Holdings Group	Financials	Financial services	Taipei	2007	State-owned banking, financial and related services	S	A
Taiwan Golden Bee	Consumer goods	Automobiles	Kaohsiung	1954	ATVs, scooters and engines	P	A
Taiwan International Ports Corporation	Industrials	Ports & shipping	Kaohsiung	2012	State-owned seaports operations	S	A
Taiwan Mobile	Telecommunications	Mobile telecommunications	New Taipei City	1997	Mobile network	P	A
Taiwan Power Company	Utilities	Conventional electricity	New Taipei City	1946	State-owned electrical power	S	A
Taiwan Railways Corporation	Industrials	Railroad	Taipei	2024	State-owned railway services	S	A
Taiwan Rolling Stock Company	Industrials	Railroad equipment	Hsinchu County	2002	Manufactures rolling stock for railroad, metro, and Light Rail Transit (LRT)	P	A
Taiwan Semiconductor Company Limited	Technology	Semiconductors	New Taipei	1979		P	A
Taiwan Star Telecom	Telecommunications	Mobile telecommunications	Taipei	2000	Mobile network, defunct 2023	P	D
Taiwan Sugar Corporation	Consumer goods	Food & beverage	Tainan	1946	State-owned sugar	S	A
Taiwan Tobacco and Liquor Corporation	Consumer goods	Food & beverage	Taipei	1945	State-owned alcohol and tobacco products	S	A
Taiwan Water Corporation	Utilities	Water	Taichung	1973	Water supply	S	A
Tamarack Microelectronics	Technology	Semiconductors	Taipei	1987	Defunct 2002	P	D
Tang Eng Iron Works	Basic materials	Iron & steel	Kaohsiung	1940	Iron and steel	P	A
Tatung Company	Consumer goods	Consumer electronics	Taipei	1918	Home appliances, TVs	P	A
Techman	Technology	Computer hardware	Taoyuan	2016	Automation & robotics	P	A
TECO Electric and Machinery	Industrials	Electrical components & equipment	Taipei	1956	Industrial motor	P	A
Tecom	Technology	Telecommunications equipment	Hsinchu	1980	GSM fixed wireless phones	P	A
Ten Ren Tea	Consumer services	Beverages	Taipei	1953	Tea beverages	P	A
Thecus	Technology	Computer hardware	Taipei	2004	Memory and storage	P	A
Thermaltake	Technology	Computer hardware	New Taipei City	1999	Computer cases & accessories	P	A
Thinking Electronic	Industrials	Electronic components & equipment	Kaohsiung	1979	Electronic parts/components	P	A
TiSPACE	Industrials	Aerospace	Chunan, Miaoli County	2016	Rockets and aerospace components	P	A
Thunder Tiger	Industrials	Aerospace & defense	Taichung	1979	Drones, Radio controlled equipment, medical equipment	P	A
Tigerair Taiwan	Consumer services	Airlines	Taipei	2013	Airline, owned by China Airlines	P	A
TKK Fried Chicken	Consumer services	Restaurants & bars	New Taipei City	1974	Restaurant chain	P	A
Tong Li Publishing	Consumer services	Publishing	Taipei	1977	Publishing	P	A
TransAsia Airways	Consumer services	Airlines	Taipei	1951	Defunct 2016	P	D
Transcend Information	Technology	Computer hardware	Taipei	1988	Memory and storage	P	A
TSMC	Technology	Semiconductors	Hsinchu	1987	World's largest Pure Play Foundry; Major customers include Apple Inc. and Nvidia.	P	A
TVBS	Consumer services	Media	Taipei	1991	Media agency	P	A
Tyan	Technology	Computer hardware	Taipei	1989	Computer accessories, owned by MiTAC	P	A
Ulead Systems	Technology	Software	Taipei	1989	Sound, photo, movie editing software	P	A
UMAX Technologies	Technology	Computer hardware	Taipei	1987	Computer and peripheral equipment	P	A
Uni Air	Consumer services	Airlines	Taipei	1998	Airline, owned by EVA Air	P	A
Uni-President Enterprises Corporation	Consumer goods	Food & beverage	New Taipei City	1967	Dairy products, beverages, snack foods, instant noodles	P	A
Unimicron	Technology	Electronics	Taoyuan	1990	Printed circuit boards, subsidiary of United Microelectronics Corporation	P	A
Union Bank of Taiwan	Financials	Banks	Taipei	1992	Banking	P	A
Unison Healthcare Group	Health care	Medical supplies	Taipei	1981	Medical devices distributor	P	A
United Microelectronics Corporation	Technology	Semiconductors	Hsinchu	1980		P	A
Universal Abit	Technology	Computer hardware	Neihu	1989	Defunct 2008	P	D
UserJoy Technology	Technology	Software	New Taipei City	1995	Gaming	P	A
Vanguard International Semiconductor Corporation	Technology	Semiconductors	Hsinchu	1994		P	A
VIA Technologies	Technology	Semiconductors	New Taipei City	1987		P	A
Wan Hai Lines	Industrials	Marine transportation	Taipei	1965	Shipping and transportation	P	A
Wang Film Productions	Consumer services	Entertainment	Taipei	1978	State-owned Animation production	S	A
Want Want	Consumer goods	Food & beverage	Taipei	1962	Dairy products, beverages, snack foods	P	A
Wei Chuan Foods Corporation	Consumer goods	Food & beverage	Taipei	1972	Dairy products, beverages, snack foods, sauces, spices	P	A
Winbond	Technology	Semiconductors	Taichung	1987		P	A
Wintek	Technology	Electronics	Taichung	1990	Defunct 2014	P	D
Wistron	Technology	Computer hardware	Taipei	2001	Computer and peripheral equipment	P	A
Wiwynn	Technology	Computer hardware	Taipei	2012	Memory and storage, networking equipment, owned by Wistron	P	A
WonderMedia	Technology	Semiconductors	Taipei	2008	Defunct 2016, acquired by VIA Technologies	P	D
World Gym	Consumer Discretionary	Recreational Services	Taichung	1976	Fitness centers	P	A
Wu Pao Chun Bakery	Consumer goods	Food & beverage	Kaohsiung	2010	Confectionery foods	P	A
XGI Technology	Technology	Computer hardware	Taipei	2003	Defunct 2010	P	D
XING Mobility	Consumer goods	Automobiles	Taipei	2015	Automobiles, electric vehicles	P	A
Yageo	Industrials	Electronic components & equipment	New Taipei City	1977	Electronic parts/components	P	A
Yang Ming Marine Transport Corporation	Industrials	Marine transportation	Keelung	1972	Shipping and transportation	P	A
Yuanta Securities	Financials	Financial services	Taipei	1990	Financial and related services	P	A
Yulon	Consumer goods	Automobiles	Miaoli County	1953	Automobiles, commercial vehicles	P	A
Zyxel	Technology	Telecommunications equipment	Hsinchu	1989	Telecommunications equipment	P	A

== See also ==
- List of airlines of Taiwan
- List of Taiwanese automakers
- List of banks in Taiwan
- Economy of Taiwan
