= Digital United =

Taiwanese internet provider

Digital United, commonly known as SeedNet, is a Taiwanese Internet service provider based in Taipei. The service offers broadband services, including fiber-optic internet and ADSL connections.

It was first a Project SEED (Software Engineering Environment Development), sponsored by the Ministry of Economic Affairs and operated by the Institute for Information Industry to push-start Taiwan's local Internet market.

Digital United was established in 2000. Its major shareholders were Far Eastern Textile (20%), Asia Cement (20%), Singtel (18%), Uni-President Enterprises Corporation (10%), and China Development Industrial Bank (10%). In November, GigaMedia, a subsidiary of the Koos Group, was said to be interested in acquiring the service.

In 2005, Digital United launched a VoIP telephony service using the SIP-based network of American internet service TelTel. In August 2007, Singtel transferred its 24.5% stake in the provider for a 3.5% share of Far EasTone. Later that year, Digital United launched an online music platform to provide value-added services to its broadband Internet access customers.

== See also ==
- List of companies of Taiwan
