= Chunghwa Int'l Communication Network =

Taiwanese telecom/network provider

Chunghwa Int'l Communication Network Co., Ltd.
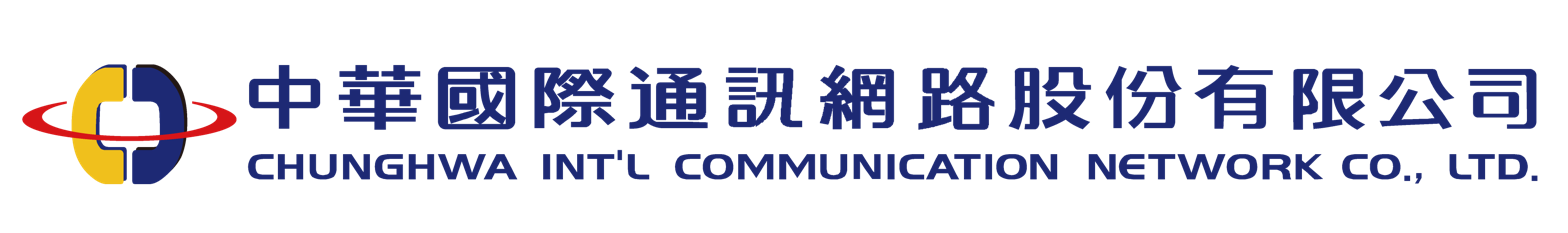
- Native name: 中華國際通訊網路股份有限公司
- Company type: 未上市股票代號:8993
- Industry: telecommunication
- Founded: 31 March 1997
- Headquarters: Republic of China
- Products: VOIP, SMS, Payment Gateway, Domain name, IDC
- Revenue: ▲NTD$ 1,000,000,000
- Number of employees: 65
- Website: www.ccnet.com.tw

Chunghwa Int'l Communication Network (CCNET; Chinese: 中華國際通訊網路股份有限公司) is a telecommunication and networking provider in Taiwan, services includes VOIP, SMS, Payment Gateway, Domain name, web hosting, co-location, IDC.

== See also ==
- List of companies of Taiwan
