= Century Development Corporation =

Company of Taiwan

Century Development Corporation (CDC; Chinese: 世正開發; pinyin: Shì Zhèng Kāifā) is a Taiwanese infrastructure company established by the Ministry of Economic Affairs with leading companies from the private sector.

== History ==
As a joint venture supervised by the Ministry of Economic Affairs, CDC was established in 1993 by companies including TECO Group, Shin Kong Group, Taishin Group, BES Engineering Corporation, RSEA Engineering Corporation, Fubon Group, and Singaporean company Ascendas. The company works with central and local governments throughout Asia to develop technology parks, industrial parks, university buildings, and other educational facilities, as well as infrastructure designed to spur economic development, attract foreign investment, and encourage the development of local industries.

CDC projects include the Technology Innovation International Park (TIIP) in Bangalore, the Nankang Software Park project in Taipei, and the Subic Bay Gateway Park in Subic Bay, Philippines.

== See also ==
- List of companies of Taiwan
