= C.C.P Contact Probes =

Taiwanese manufacturing company

C.C.P. Contact Probes
- Native name: 中國探針股份有限公司
- Company type: Public limited company
- Traded as: TW.6217
- ISIN: TW0006217003
- Industry: Electronic Equipment/Instruments
- Founded: 1986
- Headquarters: New Taipei, Taiwan
- Area served: Worldwide
- Key people: Chih-Feng Chen, CEO
- Products: Industrial plugs and connectors, Pogo Pin Connectors, High Current Connectors, Testing Probes, High Frequency Connectors
- Revenue: ▲2,274 million NTD (2018)
- Net income: ▲159.3 million NTD (2016)
- Number of employees: 1000+ (2019)
- Subsidiaries: CCP Kontakt GmbH, CCP Connection Platform Inc., Dong Guan CCP Contact Probes Co Ltd. シーシーピーコンタクトプローブ
- Website: ccpcontactprobes.com

C.C.P. Contact Probes Co., Ltd. (Chinese: 中國探針股份有限公司; pinyin: Zhōng Guó Tàn Zhēn Yǒu Xiàn Gōng Sī ) is a Taiwanese manufacturer of testing probes and probe-like connectors. The company was founded by Chung-Kai Huang (黃介崇) on January 22, 1986 and is headquartered in New Taipei, Taiwan. C.C.P Contact Probes., Ltd. operates internationally with global sales offices in China, Hong Kong, USA and Germany and has approximately 1000 employees. The 4 main products are testing solutions, Pogo Pin Connectors, EV Crown Spring Connectors and Industrial Connectors. The company is a supplier for Pogo Pin connectors of major brands around the world such as Apple, Huawei, and Microsoft. Known products such as the Macbook Series from Apple Inc. or the Surface Pro 4 from Microsoft are using magnet connectors from C.C.P. Contact Probes.

C.C.P. Contact Probes Co., Ltd. is listed at the Taiwanese Stock Exchange (Bloomberg Ticker: 6217:TT). In 2017, it had approximately NTD1,892.3 million (~USD60 million) revenue and a Net Income of NTD159.3 million (~USD5.15 million).

== History ==
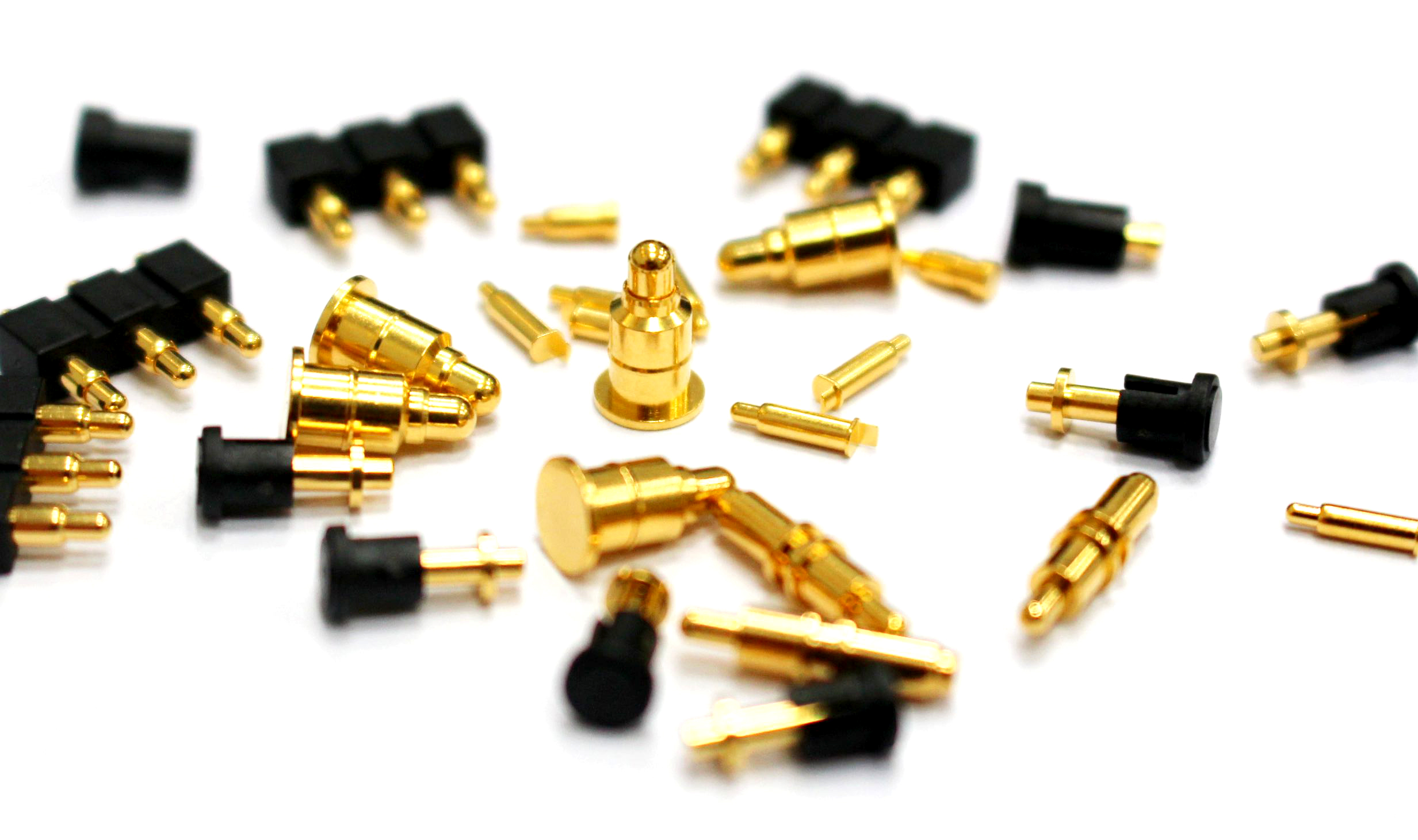
Pogo Pin Connectors Designed and Manufactured by C.C.P. Contact Probes

- 2020 Korea Branch Established
- 2019 Singapore and Japanese Branch Established
- 2018 European and Indian Branch Established
- 2015 Launch of the USA Office in San Jose and roll out of new Contact Pin Series
- 2012 Set up 2nd generation production line with 100K-class clean room and developed the Crown Spring Connector series
- 2010 Obtained ISO 9001:2008
- 2009 Developed Magnetic Connector with Lenovo and set up the Plating Lab
- 2008 Obtained ISO QC 080000 certificate and set up of C.C.P. International Co., Ltd. office in Hong Kong
- 2006 Set up of IC Socket factory in Taipei and the Beijing Branch Office
- 2003 Listed in Taiwan Stock Market (TW.6217)
- 2002 Obtained BSI ISO 9001:2000 certificate
- 2000 Dong Guan C.C.P. Contact Probes Co., Ltd. was founded
- 1986 CCP Contact Probes Enterprise Co., Ltd established

== Finance ==
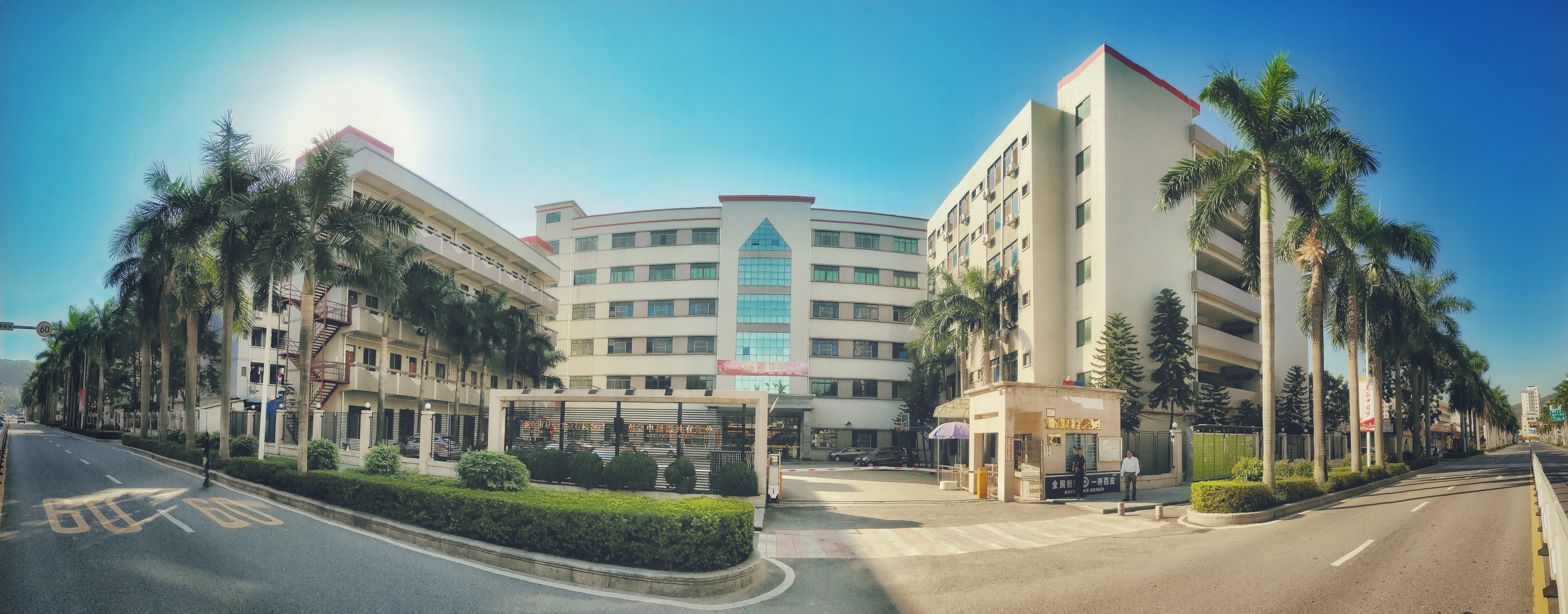
The manufacturing facility in Dongguan, Humen Town was set up in 2001 and mostly produces Spring Loaded Connectors.

C.C.P. Contact Probes Co., Ltd. is listed at the Taiwanese Stock Exchange (ISIN TW0006217003). In 2016, it had approximately NTD1,892.3 million(~USD60 million) revenue and a Net Income of NTD159.3 million (~USD5.15 million). The company invests approximately 7% of its operating revenue in R&D activities.

=== Ownership ===
Ownership 2019
Name	Shares	%
Chih-Feng Chen	3,776,397	5.79%
Li-Chi Investment Co., Ltd.	1,437,060	2.20%
Jing-yu Lin	153,803	0.24%
Tzung-Ming Tsai	265,957	0.41%
Eddie Tsai	209,851	0.32%

=== Sales ===
Sales 2016
Region		Amount (in thousand NTD)	%
Domestic		284,866	15.12
International Sales	Asia	1,191,324	63.25
International Sales	Others	407,362	21.63
International Sales	Total	1,598,686	84.88
Total Net Sales		1,883,552	100.00

== See also ==
- List of companies of Taiwan
