= Tecom =

Tecom Co., Ltd. (Tecom; Chinese: 東訊股份有限公司; pinyin: Dōngxùn Gǔfèn Yǒuxiàn Gōngsī) is the Telecom Arm of TECOM industrial group, a manufacturer of telecommunications equipment, that was established in 1980 in the Science-Based Industrial Park at Hsinchu, Taiwan.

Currently, there are over 1,400 employees.

TECOM's product lines include business communication systems, Wireless communication systems, infrastructure transmission systems, and Broadband/IP communication systems.

Tecom is also involved in telecommunications service, such as providing GSM and Fixed Network services in Taiwan, broadband Internet access for building complexes, as well as Fixed Wireless Access (FWA) in rural communities and developing countries.

Tecom has been publicly listed on the Taiwan Stock Exchange since November 1991. TECOM is also the name of the economic zone in Dubai - Internet City.

== See also ==
- List of companies of Taiwan
