= TCI Bio =

Taiwanese CDMO and contract manufacturer of dietary supplements and cosmetics

TCI Co., Ltd.
- Native name: 大江生醫股份有限公司
- Type: Public (Taiwan OTC)
- Traded as: TWSE: 8436
- Industry: Biotechnology; health & personal care manufacturing (CDMO/ODM)
- Founded: August 1, 1980; 46 years ago
- Founder: Ta Chiang International Co., Ltd. (original corporate entity)
- Headquarters: 8F, No. 187, Gangqian Road, Neihu District, Taipei, Taiwan
- Key people: Lin Yong-Hsiang (林詠翔) (Chairman & CEO)
- Products: Functional beverages, dietary supplements, probiotics, collagen, skincare/beauty products (CDMO/ODM)
- Revenue: (see financials section)
- Number of employees: ~884 (group-wide, 2021 est.)
- Website: www.tci-bio.com

TCI Co., Ltd. (Chinese: 大江生醫股份有限公司) is a Taiwanese contract development and manufacturing organization (CDMO) specializing in the research, development and production of functional beverages, dietary supplements and skincare products. Headquartered in the Neihu Technology Park in Taipei, TCI evolved from an original trading company founded in 1980 into a CDMO group serving clients across Asia, Europe and North America, and is publicly traded on Taiwan's over-the-counter market under the code 8436.

== History ==
The corporate origins trace back to 1980, when the predecessor trading company (Ta Chiang International) was established. In the late 1990s the group created a biomedical division and moved progressively into health-care product development and manufacturing.

In 2011 the company transitioned its business model from an ODM (original design manufacturer) to a CDMO (contract development and manufacturing organization), emphasizing integrated bioscience design, proprietary ingredient development and turnkey manufacturing services for clients seeking private-label and brand products.

The firm went public on Taiwan's OTC market in 2013 (listing date 12 September 2013) with stock code 8436, accelerating capital access for factory expansion, R&D laboratories and overseas business development.

Since the 2010s TCI has expanded into multiple subsidiaries and business lines (including genetic testing and digital health services), pursued international client partnerships, and invested in laboratory and production capacity—reporting a group workforce in the high hundreds and multiple manufacturing sites and laboratories by the early 2020s.

== Research, development and products ==
TCI provides end-to-end services for the nutraceutical and cosmetic sectors: market analysis and concept design, ingredient sourcing and proprietary raw material development (IBD—Integrated Bioscience Design), formulation R&D, stability and safety testing, pilot production, and full-scale manufacturing for capsules, soft gels, liquids, powders, and cosmetic formulations. The company markets private-label products under group consumer channels as well as acting as a CDMO for domestic and international brands. Subsidiaries and affiliated brands include genetic testing (TCI GENE) and consumer retail channels (TCI Living), reflecting a diversification strategy across upstream R&D and downstream retail.

TCI Bio conducts research in functional ingredients, metabolic health, beauty-from-within products, and gut microbiome applications. The company reports conducting human clinical studies to evaluate ingredient efficacy in areas such as metabolic health, weight management, glycemic control, skin health, and gut health. TCI employs a proprietary AI-driven ingredient discovery system it calls Bio-Resource Data Mining, described as an automated, cloud-based platform used to identify bioactive natural compounds for potential formulation development.

In addition to contract manufacturing services, TCI Bio has developed proprietary nutraceutical ingredients, including:

- GLP-1 Formula – a formulation intended to support endogenous glucagon-like peptide-1 (GLP-1) activity. The GLP-1 Formula is a proprietary blend of plant extracts, probiotics, and prebiotics developed to support endogenous glucagon-like peptide-1 (GLP-1) activity. GLP-1 is a hormone secreted by intestinal L-cells in response to food intake that regulates insulin secretion, suppresses glucagon release, reduces appetite, and slows gastric emptying. TCI leveraged its Bio-Resource Data Mining technology to identify natural active compounds, and subsequently developed the formula through in-vitro validations and human trials. In-vitro studies indicated that the formula stimulates natural GLP-1 secretion from intestinal L-cells, which TCI reported to support stable blood glucose levels, enhances fat metabolism, and may induce white fat browning.
- SugarLock – a botanical extract designed to modulate postprandial glucose response. It is described as a proprietary, polyphenol-rich, allergen-free extract, and in clinical evaluation over a six-week intervention period was shown to support fasting blood glucose, decrease body fat, and attenuate postprandial blood sugar spikes. Outcomes were further validated through continuous glucose monitoring (CGM). TCI has positioned SugarLock as an ingredient for brands targeting glycemic control and metabolic health applications. The ingredient was featured at SupplySide Global 2025, where TCI's Chief Product Officer presented clinical findings from the intervention study.
- PDRN-based formulations – nucleotide-derived compounds used in cosmetic and skin health applications. TCI incorporates PDRN into its cosmetic and skin health formulation portfolio as part of its broader beauty-from-within and topical skincare product lines. A recognized challenge in cosmetic application of PDRN is its large molecular weight, susceptibility to decomposition, low bioavailability, and poor stability and skin permeability — factors that have spurred development of delivery technologies such as liposomal encapsulation. TCI's broader CDMO capabilities in liposomal formulation, marketed under the doubleNUTRI liposomal platform, are relevant to addressing such delivery challenges for bioactive ingredients.
- Happy Banana - Banana Peel Extract is a proprietary botanical ingredient developed by TCI from the peel of Musa × paradisiaca. The ingredient has been developed for applications related to sleep health, mood support, and circadian rhythm regulation. TCI has established extraction and standardization technologies and conducted both in vitro studies and randomized, double-blind, placebo-controlled human clinical trials to evaluate its physiological effects. According to published studies, supplementation with the ingredient was associated with changes in biomarkers related to serotonin, melatonin, autonomic nervous system activity, and sleep quality.The ingredient has also been included in a U.S. Food and Drug Administration (FDA) New Dietary Ingredient (NDI) notification, evaluated under Australia's Therapeutic Goods Administration (TGA) ingredient framework, and is protected by multiple international patent applications related to banana peel extract and its applications.

== Public listing, financials and governance ==
TCI is listed on Taiwan's OTC market (stock code 8436). Regulatory and investor pages report the company's registration details, public offering timeline (public offering 25 August 2011; OTC listing 12 September 2013), paid-in capital and disclosure contacts. Quarterly and annual reports are published on the company's investor relations pages.

== Recognition and sustainability ==
TCI has publicly promoted sustainability initiatives and in recent years participated in corporate sustainability networks. Industry reporting and chamber notices noted TCI's membership in RE100 initiatives or climate/sustainability collaborations, positioning the company among early adopters in Taiwan's biotech/manufacturing sector to commit to renewable energy targets and net-zero ambitions.

== Contemporary developments and strategy ==
Throughout the 2020s TCI pursued an acquisition and expansion phase, increasing capacity for CDMO services, establishing additional labs, and extending product portfolios into probiotics, collagen, functional drinks and clinical-grade ingredients. The company emphasizes integrated R&D, regulatory compliance for international markets, and sustainability in manufacturing operations.

== Criticism and market challenges ==
As with many contract manufacturers in the nutraceutical and cosmetic sectors, TCI faces sector-wide pressures including regulatory compliance across multiple jurisdictions, supply-chain volatility (raw material sourcing), increasing competition from lower-cost regional producers, and the need to demonstrate product efficacy and safety through independent clinical evidence. Publicly available sources emphasize the company's efforts to address these through expanded testing capabilities and R&D investment; independent media coverage and financial reports remain the primary sources for external assessment of performance and governance.

== See also ==
- Nutraceutical
- Contract development and manufacturing organization
- List of companies of Taiwan
- Daiken Bio
