= Avision =

Taiwanese printer manufacturer

- Avision Logo
- Company type: Public
- Traded as: TWSE: 2380
- Industry: Office automation
- Founded: April 1991
- Headquarters: No. 20, Creation Road 1, Science-Based Industrial Park, Hsinchu 300, Taiwan, R.O.C., Hsinchu, Taiwan
- Number of locations: Taiwan, China (2), Japan, Germany, United States
- Area served: worldwide
- Products: Image scanners and multifunction printers
- Revenue: US$110,000,000 (2010)
- Number of employees: 2000
- Website: www.avision.com.tw

Avision (Chinese: 虹光精密工業股份有限公司) is a Taiwan based company founded in 1991 that designs and produces image scanners and multifunction printers. The company was established in Hsinchu Science and Industrial Park in 1991.

Avision is member of the TWAIN Working Group, a nonprofit organization that maintains TWAIN standard specification, data source manager, sample code, software protocol and applications programming interface (API) for regulating communication between software applications and imaging devices. For business application, the company offers color imaging scanners and multifunction printers, as well as document capture software.

The head office is located in Hsinchu Science and Industrial Park, and the company operates worldwide. Avision owns and operates four branch offices in China, Germany, the United States, and Brasil, and employs approximately 2,000 individuals.

== Timeline ==
- In April 1991, Avision is established in Hsinchu, Taiwan, ROC by a group of engineers with engineering experience in imaging processing technology.
- In November 1992, Avision made its first document scanners (AV800C, ODM) with an ADF (auto document feeder) which can hold a 50-page document at one time.
- In December 1993, Avision unveiled its first sheetfed scanner (AV100P, ODM) and won PC magazine's Editor's Choice
- In February 1996, Avision introduced its first flatbed scanner (AV6240).
- In February 1997, Avision introduced its first compact A4-size flatbed scanner - AV260, and its first A3-size flatbed scanner - AVA3 for the consumer market.
- In December 1998, Avision's annual revenue exceeded NT$3,800M(US$108M). Its company stocks went public at the Taiwan Stock Exchange.
- In May 1999, Avision unveiled its new product, NetDeliver @V2000, a network scan station to scan and distribute the scanned images over the network. The NetDeliver series allows users to scan single-sided or double-sided documents and deliver the electronic image to e-mail recipients, a network printer, ftp server, web site, or a computer on the network.
- In December 1999, Avision expanded its head office to additional 3rd and 4th floor (entire working space 30,253 square meters).
- In December 2000, Avision's annual revenue exceeded NT$9,400M (US$268M).
- In November 2001, Avision expanded its manufacturing capacity by establishing its manufacturing base in Suzhou, China. (Fab I, 31,000 square meters)
- In October 2004, Avision incorporated the technology of a scanner and a laser printer by introducing its first MFP, AM3000 series to the market. The AM3000 series are able to perform print, copy, and fax with an additional fax module.
- In September 2006, Avision established additional manufacturing base in China-Avision Business Tech (Fab II, 33,568 square meters)

Avision's headquarter in Hsinchu	Avision's factory in China (Fab I)	Avision's factory in China (Fab II)

== See also ==
- List of companies of Taiwan
