= Alleycat's Pizza =

Taiwanese pizza chain

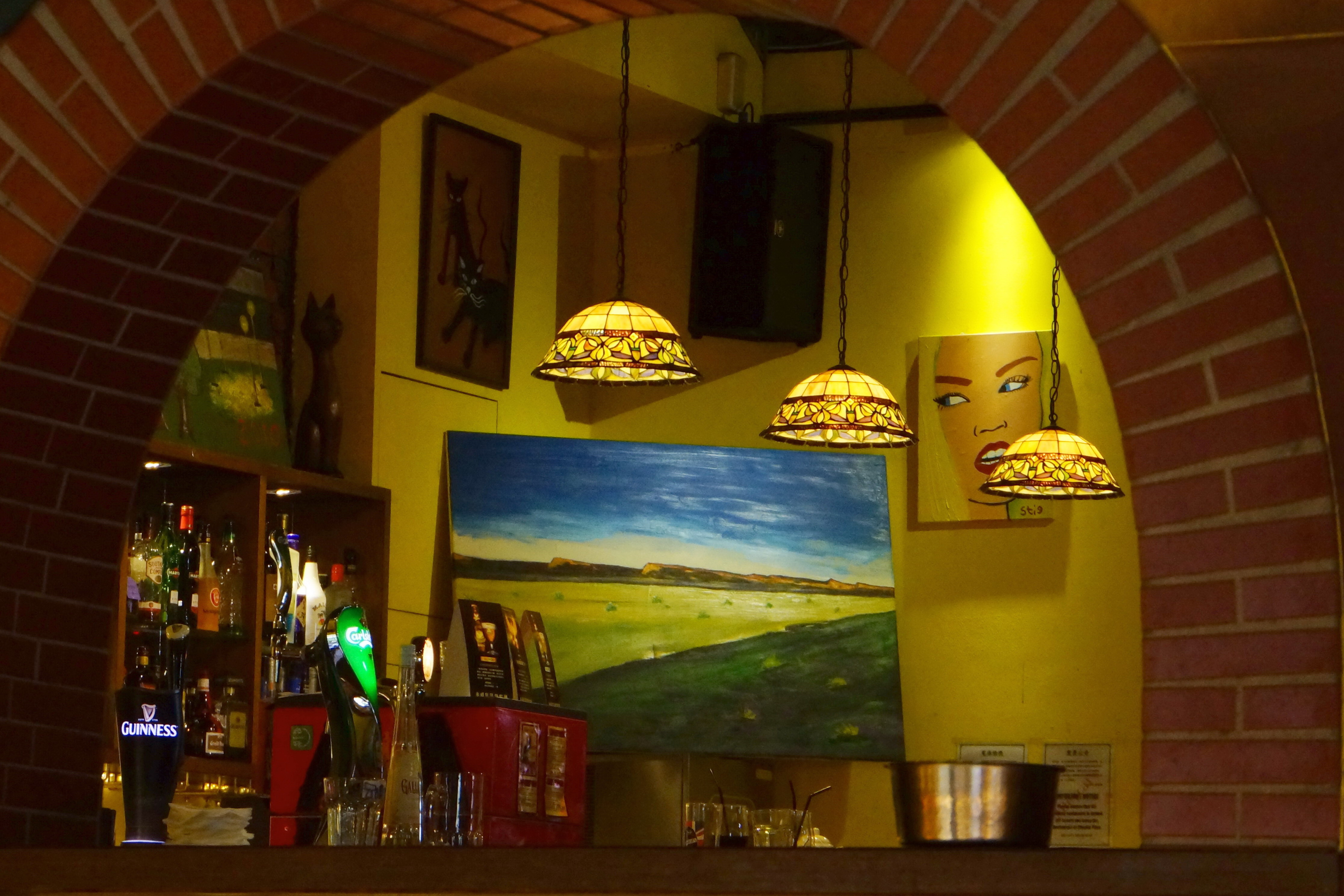
- Interior of restaurant
- Industry: Restaurant chain
- Founded: 2004
- Headquarters: Taipei, Taiwan
- Key people: Alan Pontes, Mark Thomas
- Products: Pizza, calzones
- Website: alleycatspizza.com

Alleycat's Pizza, usually referred to simply as Alleycat's, is a pizzeria chain restaurant that started in Taipei, Taiwan, in 2004. Started in the tiny basement level of a building on Lishui Street, it had expanded to twelve locations throughout Taipei. As of 2023 there is only one remaining location in Taipei, at 1914 Huashan 1914 Creative Park.

== History ==
Alleycat's was started in 2004 by Alan Pontes, a South African expatriate with Italian family roots. The dearth of Italian pizza available in Taiwan gave Pontes the idea of starting his own pizza restaurant, featuring a masonry oven. It addressed a long-felt need among the expat population for more traditional pizza varieties (as opposed to the locally popular toppings based on East Asian cuisine). A second location opened in Neihu in early 2006, quickly followed by a third in the former VFW post building in Tienmu.

The original Lishui Street basement location was closed in 2006 when a street-level space in an adjacent building became available. Twelve new Alleycat's locations were added, before most of the locations closed with the exception of one restaurant remaining in the Taipei area. In 2007, Pontes briefly left Taiwan, and the chain was sold to Mark Thomas. Pontes returned to Taiwan in 2008, and started a new restaurant, Yuma Southwest Grill. Yuma Southwest Grill closed its doors for business the following year.

== Signage ==
Alleycat's signage is simply the name in red-on-black lettering in a stylized font. Although the chain has used various drawings for promotions from time to time, it does not use a logo.

== See also ==
- List of companies of Taiwan
