= Chun Yuan Steel =

Manufacturing company of Taiwan

- Native name: 春源鋼鐵工業
- Founded: 7 January 1966; 60 years ago
- Headquarters: Taipei, Taiwan
- Key people: Tsai Hsi-chi (chairperson)
- Website: www.cysco.com.tw

Chun Yuan Steel Industry (Chinese: 春源鋼鐵工業; pinyin: Chūn Yuán Gāngtiě Gōngyè; TWSE: 2010) is a steel producer in Taiwan. It is the largest steel company in northern Taiwan. Its factories are located in New Taipei, Taichung and Kaohsiung. Chun Yuan also invests for founding steel mills in Mainland China.

== History ==
The company was established on 7 January 1966.

== See also ==
- List of companies of Taiwan
