= CNet Technology =

Company of Taiwan

CNet Technology, Inc.
- Founded: 1989; 37 years ago
- Headquarters: Zhonghe, Taipei, Taiwan
- Key people: Chairman: Jiazhen Zhang
- Products: Network equipment
- Website: www.cnetusa.com

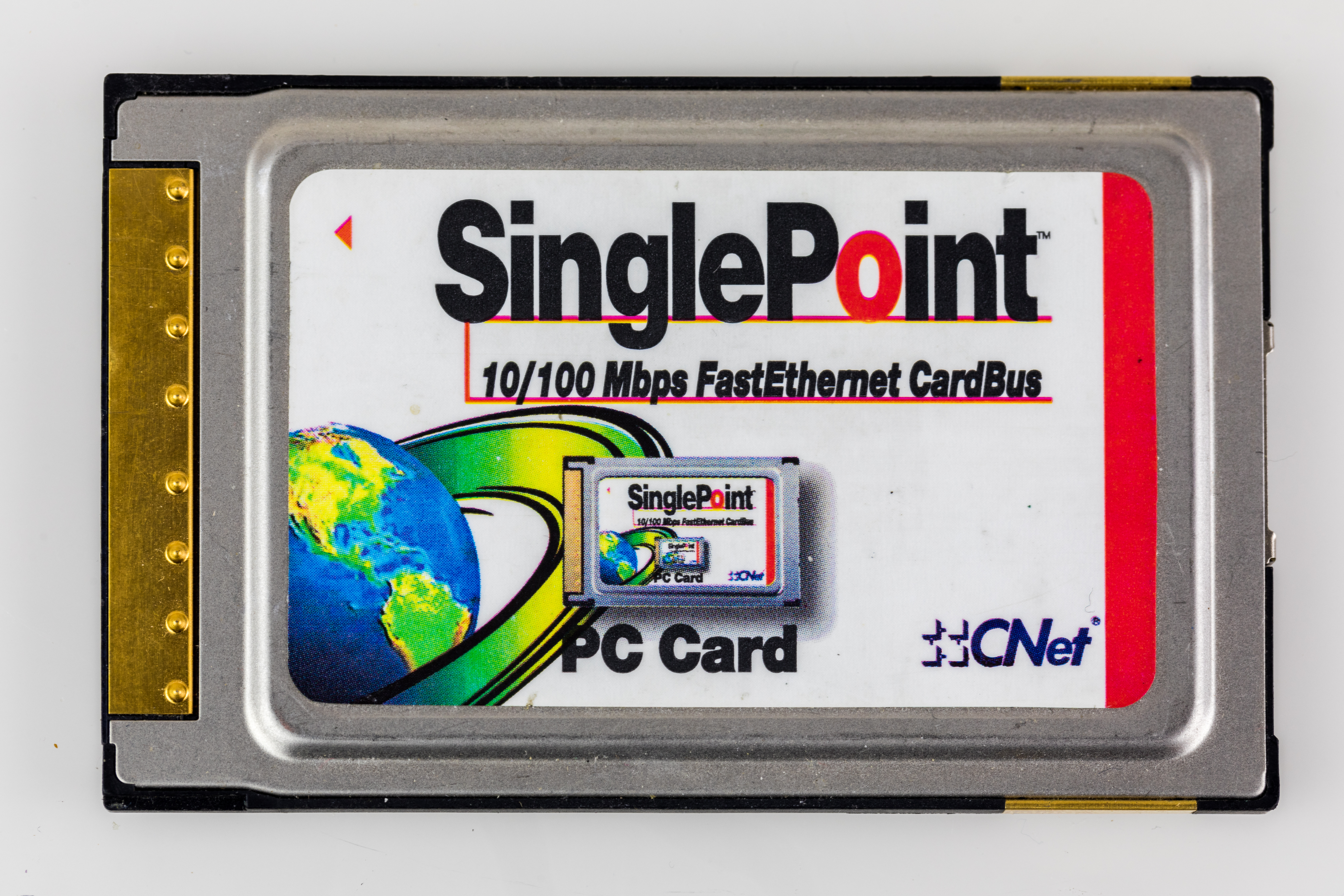
CNet SinglePoint 10/100 Mbit/s FastEthernet CardBus

CNet Technology is a Taiwanese company that manufactures network equipment such as network cards, switches, and modems.

== History ==
The company was established in 1989 in Hsinchu Science Park.

== See also ==
- List of companies of Taiwan
