= Shihlin Electric =

Shihlin Electric and Engineering Corporation
- Trade name: Shihlin Electric
- Native name: 士林電機廠股份有限公司
- Company type: Public (TWSE: 1503)
- Founded: 1955
- Headquarters: Taipei, Taiwan
- Key people: Emmet Hsu (Chairperson)
- Products: Automobile equipment system, breaker switchgear and system, heavy electric system, factory automation, system engineering
- Owner: Mitsubishi Electric
- Number of employees: 1,837 (Taiwan), 1,648 (Mainland China), 454 (Vietnam)
- Website: www.seec.com.tw

Shihlin Electric and Engineering Corporation (SEEC; Chinese: 士林電機廠股份有限公司; pinyin: Shìlín Diànjīchǎng Gǔfèn Yǒuxiàn Gōngsī) is a company based in Taipei, Taiwan, which manufactures electrical and power transformers, capacitors, control panels, automation, automotive electrical devices, and other electronics. The technology for the manufacturing originally involved technology transfers from Mitsubishi Electric (Japan) and France Transfo, a Schneider Electric Company (France).

Shihlin Electric was founded in 1955. The company is listed on the Taiwan Stock Exchange (TSE 1503), and Mitsubishi Electric (Japan) is a 20% share holder. Shihlin Electric, in Q1 2009, lists 15 sales subsidiaries and over 100 distribution partners worldwide. Additionally, Shihlin Electric operates manufacturing factories in Taiwan (three in Hsinchu), Mainland China (ten in Xiamen, Suzhou, Wuxi, Changzhou, Fuzhou and Wuhan) and Vietnam (one in Southern Vietnam).

In recent years, Shihlin Electric has actively invested in the green energy sector, striving to provide comprehensive green power and heavy electrical solutions. According to its 2023 Sustainability Report, Shihlin Electric has set a short-term goal of increasing the revenue share of green energy products and services to 30% within three years, with a long-term target of 50% in more than three years.

In the field of renewable energy, Shihlin Electric has installed two rooftop solar power systems with a total capacity of 609 kW. Looking ahead to 2030, the company aims to achieve a cumulative solar installation capacity of 5.1 MW, with self-generated green electricity accounting for 15% of its total power consumption.

In the electric vehicle (EV) sector, Shihlin Electric continues to develop EV power systems ranging from 10 kW to 150 kW and is actively expanding into the EV charging station market. Additionally, the company has partnered with HDRE (HD Renewable Energy) to establish two joint ventures in Taiwan, leveraging both parties' strengths in production and sales channels to expand the EV charging business—with plans to further extend this business into the Japanese market.

== See also ==
- List of companies of Taiwan
