= Jadever =

Taiwanese multinational corporation

Jadever Scale Co., Ltd. 鈺恆股份有限公司
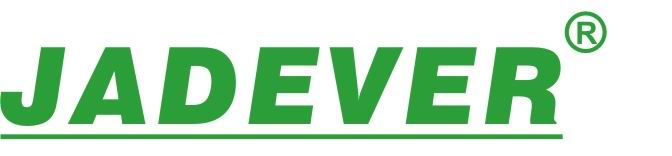
- Company type: Limited Company
- Industry: Manufacturer, Wholesaler
- Founded: 1986
- Headquarters: Taipei, Taiwan
- Key people: David Huang; Irving Chiang
- Products: Weighing Scale, Counting Scale, Portable Scale, Precision Balance, Bench Scale, Indicator, Crane Scale, Platform, Controller, Semi-auto Packing Machine, Load Cell
- Number of employees: Approx. 200 (2010)
- Website: www.jadever.com

Jadever Scale Co., Ltd. (Chinese: 鈺恆股份有限公司; pinyin: Yùhéng Gǔfèn Yǒuxiàn Gōngsī) is a Taiwanese multinational corporation, manufacturer of scales, analytical instruments and components. The company is headquartered in Taipei, with several branches in Mainland China (the most important of them located in Xiamen) and sales representative offices worldwide.

Jadever's product development includes several industry transitions, such as the introduction of LCDs for indicators and the production of energy-efficient scales. In [Year?], the company released the JDI "robot" digital scale, which incorporates automated digital processing features.

"Jadever" is a portmanteau of the English words "Jade" and "Ever". However, the exact translation of the Chinese name (simplified Chinese: 鈺恆; traditional Chinese: 钰恒; pinyin: yùhéng) means "permanent treasure". According to the company, the name implies the slogan "We treasure the value of scale".

== History and business model ==
Jadever was founded in July, 1986. During its first years of existence, the company advanced in technology innovation and developing a business plan. In 1998, the first of their products received approval from the International Organization of Legal Metrology. In 1999, Xiamen Jadever Scale Co., Ltd. is established; the main production area for the company is located here. By 2006 Jadever acquired ISO 9001:2000 certification.

Currently, the company maintains its headquarters in Taipei, plus branches in four Chinese cities (Xiamen, Shanghai, Shenzhen and Wuhan) and an international branch in Markham, Canada. Jadever expects to position itself in Latin America with their regional project for 2010, aim to distribute its brand products in Spanish, Portuguese and French languages versions.

== Main Products ==
The company produces weighing scale, price-computing scales, counting scales, indicators, platforms, load cells and several other accessories. Lately, the company is investing in expand its catalogue and improve the internal capacity and technology of its products, having as an example the most advanced model of the company, the JDI robot scale, which is on production and sale since late 2009.

== See also ==
- List of companies of Taiwan
