= Innodisk =

Taiwanese electronics company

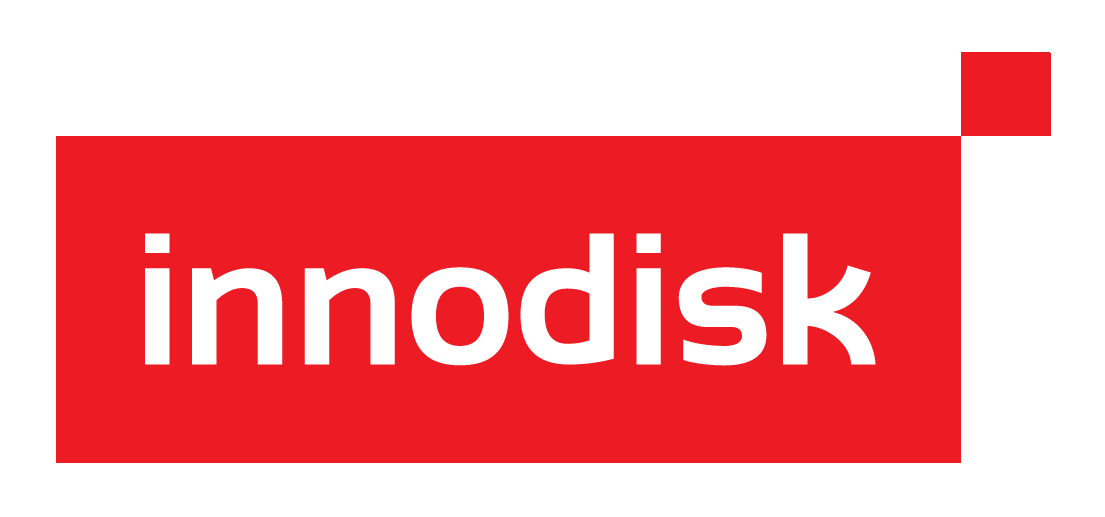

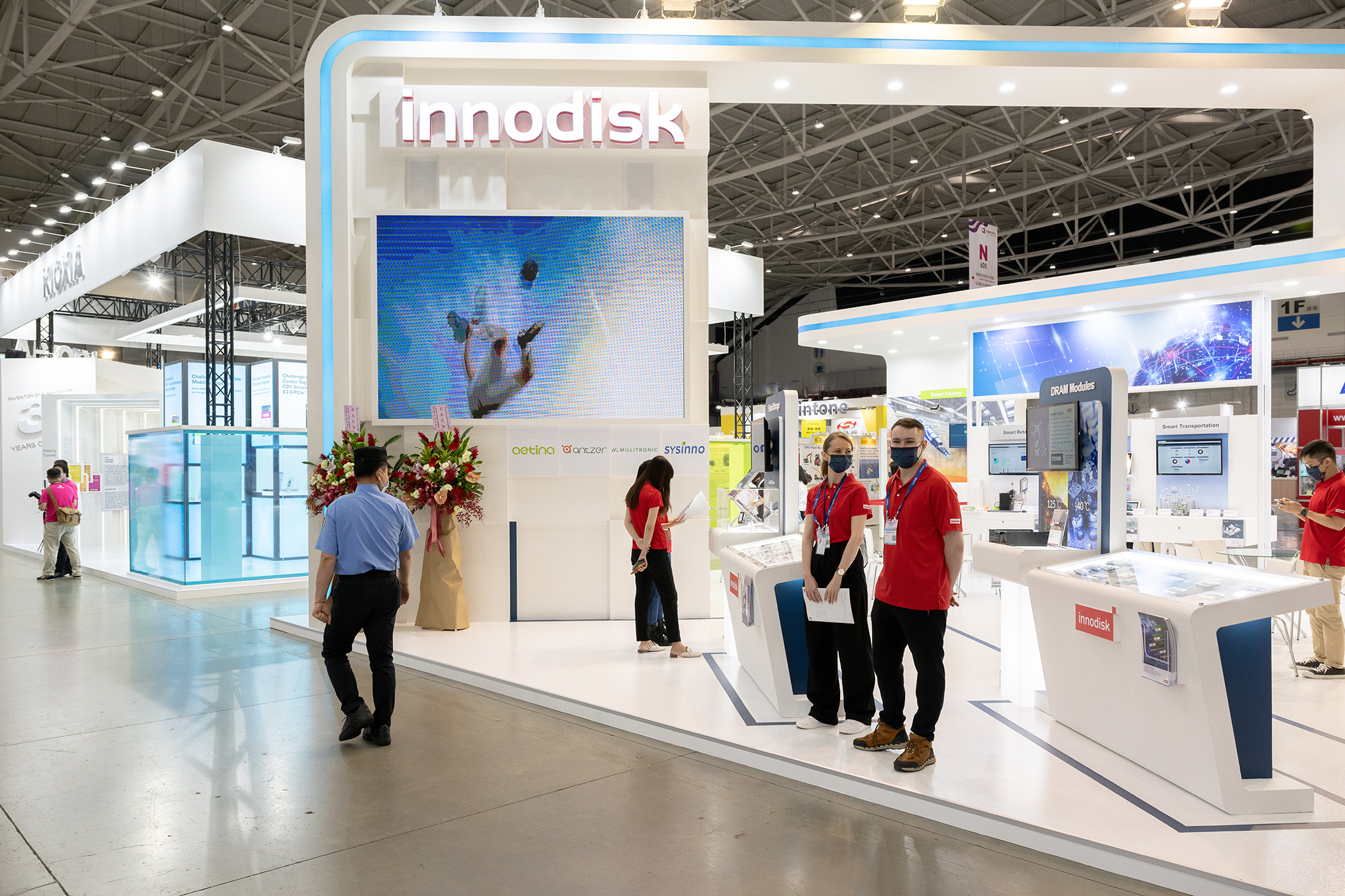
- Innodisk booth at COMPUTEX Taipei 2022
- Native name: 宜鼎國際
- Type: Public
- Traded as: TPEx: 5289
- Industry: Computer and Peripheral Equipment Manufacturing
- Founded: 2005; 21 years ago
- Founder: Richard Lee
- Headquarters: Xizhi District, New Taipei City, Taiwan
- Area served: Worldwide
- Key people: Randy Chien (CEO)
- Products: Embedded system; Flash memory; Memory modules
- Number of employees: 781
- Website: www.innodisk.com

Innodisk Corporation (Chinese: 宜鼎國際股份有限公司; pinyin: Yí dǐng guójì gǔfèn yǒuxiàn gōngsī) is a Taiwanese provider of industrial embedded flash and storage products and technologies, with a focus on enterprise, industrial and aerospace industries. Founded in 2005 and headquartered in Xizhi District, New Taipei City, its products are mainly embedded storage devices, dynamic random access memory modules, embedded peripheral modules, software and related technical services.

== History ==
Innodisk was formally established in Taiwan in March 2005. Subsidiaries were established in the following years, with the U.S. subsidiary in October 2008, the subsidiary in Japan in February 2010 and a subsidiary in China in January 2011.

An office in the Netherlands was established in April 2012, which was restructured into a Dutch subsidiary in January 2015.

The company went public in August of the same year and was listed in October 2012. In November 2013 the stocks were listed on the OTC.

In January 2013, the company launched a new corporate identity image. In December 2015, the company established the Innodisk International Education Foundation. In May 2018, a R&D and Manufacturing Center was completed in Yilan, Taiwan.

== Awards and recognitions ==
- November 2018: Selected as Top 35 Taiwanese International Brands
- October 2019: Selected as Top 35 International Brands in Taiwan
- March 2019: The Dutch branch opens a new office in Eindhoven
- November 2020: Selected as Top 35 International Brands in Taiwan

== See also ==
- List of companies of Taiwan
