= Thinking Electronic =

Taiwanese electronics manufacturer

Thinking Electronic Industrial Co., Ltd. 興勤電子工業股份有限公司
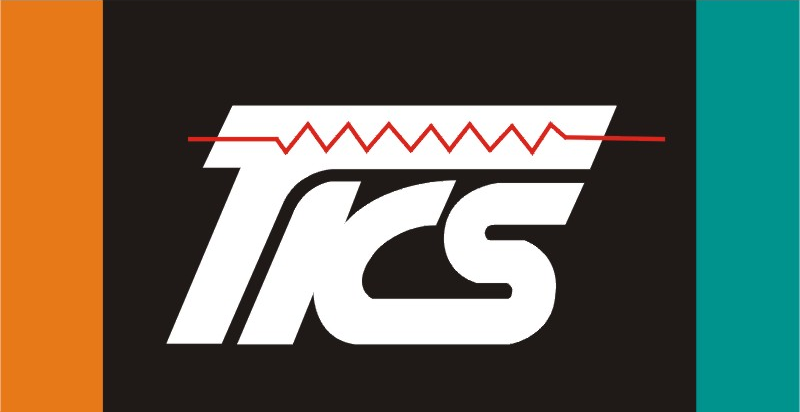
- Type: public (TWSE 2428)
- Industry: Electronics
- Founded: 1979
- Headquarters: Kaohsiung, Taiwan
- Products: NTC and PTC Thermistors, Varistors, ESD suppressor, Polymer resettable fuses, Temperature Sensors
- Website: www.thinking.com.tw

Thinking Electronic Industrial Co., Ltd. (THINKING; Chinese: 興勤電子工業股份有限公司; pinyin: Xìngqín Diànzǐ Gōngyè Gǔfèn Yǒuxiàn Gōngsī) (TWSE：2428) is one of the major circuit protection component manufacturer in Taiwan. It was established in 1979 and the headquarters are in Kaohsiung, Taiwan.

== Locations ==
THINKING manufactures products in Kaohsiung. More production facilities in China include Guangdong, Jiangsu, Hubei and Jiangxi.

== Products and services ==
Started from ceramic material than extended to polymer and metal, THINKING developed series of products to protect electronic circuit from damaged by over current, overvoltage or overheat. Portfolio includes NTC (negative temperature coefficient) and PTC (positive temperature coefficient) thermistors, temperature sensor probes, varistors, ESD (electrostatic discharge) suppressors, and polymer resettable fuses (also known as PPTC).

== Market position ==
It is well known as NTC Thermistor and varistor manufacturer in Taiwan, as well as the first publicly listed cooperation in Taiwan's protective component industry. With the PC industry rising from the 1980s in Taiwan, its NTC thermistor is adapted as the inrush current limiter in switched-mode power supply to suppress the inrush current when power supply turns on, and the varistor protects the circuit from damaged by surge current occasionally occurred in the electricity network. This earns THINKING a role in the supply chain of the switched-mode power supply industry and listed into top 1,000 manufacturers in Taiwan by the press.

== See also ==
- List of companies of Taiwan
- Switched-mode power supply
- Inrush current
- Varistor
- Thermistor
- Varistor
- Temperature sensor
