= Plustek =

Computer hardware company based in Taiwan

Plustek Inc.
- Industry: Computer industry
- Founded: 7 June 1986; 40 years ago
- Headquarters: Taipei, Taiwan
- Products: Image scanners
- Services: Manufacture scanners
- Number of employees: 200
- Website: plustek.com

Plustek Inc. (Chinese: 精益科技; pinyin: Jīngyì Kējì) is a computer hardware company established in 1986 that manufactures image scanners, as well as surveillance devices in recent years. They have the MobileOffice, SmartOffice, OpticBook, OpticPro, OpticFilm, and OpticSlim line of products.

== Competitors ==
- Canon
- Epson
- Fujitsu
- HP
- KeyScan
- Lexmark
- Microtek
- Mustek Systems
- Ricoh
- Xerox
- Umax
- Avision Inc

== See also ==
- List of companies of Taiwan
