= E.SUN Commercial Bank =

Taiwanese bank

E.SUN Commercial Bank 玉山商業銀行
- Company type: Privately owned company
- Industry: Bank
- Founded: February 1992
- Founder: Yung-Jen Huang
- Headquarters: No.117, Sec.3, Minsheng E.Rd., Songshan Dist, 105-46, Taipei, Taiwan
- Area served: Taiwan, United States, Hong Kong, Singapore, China, Vietnam, Myanmar, Cambodia, Australia, and Japan
- Key people: Joseph N.C. Huang （Chairman） Mao-Chin Chen （CEO）
- Total assets: NT$2,947,000,000,000
- Parent: E.SUN Financial Holding Co., Ltd.
- Website: https://www.esunbank.com/en/

E.SUN Commercial Bank, Ltd. (Commonly known as E.SUN Bank, E.SUN, Chinese: 玉山商業銀行) is a Taiwanese bank headquartered in Taipei, Taiwan.

== Background ==
E.SUN Bank was founded in 1992 by Mr. Yung-Jen Huang, the current chairman of E.SUN financial holding company. Responding to the surging Asia market and trend of financial innovation, E.SUN Bank is focus on its priority markets in Asia, Australia, and US, with 139 branches in Taiwan and 28 branches and subsidiaries in 9 countries and jurisdictions as of December 31, 2020.

== Overseas operations ==
- 5 operating sites under E.SUN Bank (China), China subsidiary
- 14 presences under Union Commercial Bank, Cambodian subsidiary
- Hong Kong Branch
- Los Angeles Branch
- Singapore Branch
- Dong-Nai Branch
- Sydney Branch
- Brisbane Branch
- Yangon Branch
- Tokyo Branch
- Hanoi City Representative Office (Vietnam)

== Financial performance ==
E.SUN Bank's overall profit after tax in 2020 reached NT$16.465 billion. The EPS, ROE, and ROA were NT$1.43, 9.45% and 0.61%, respectively. The overall business maintained steady growth. In 2020, the growth rates of total loans and total deposit were 12.3% and 19.4%, respectively. Loan growth was achieved while maintaining sound asset quality. The NPL ratio was 0.19%. The NPL coverage ratio was 656.3%.

== See also ==
- List of banks in Taiwan
- Economy of Taiwan
- List of companies of Taiwan
- Mercuries Life Insuranc
