= Sheico =

Taiwanese water sports equipment company

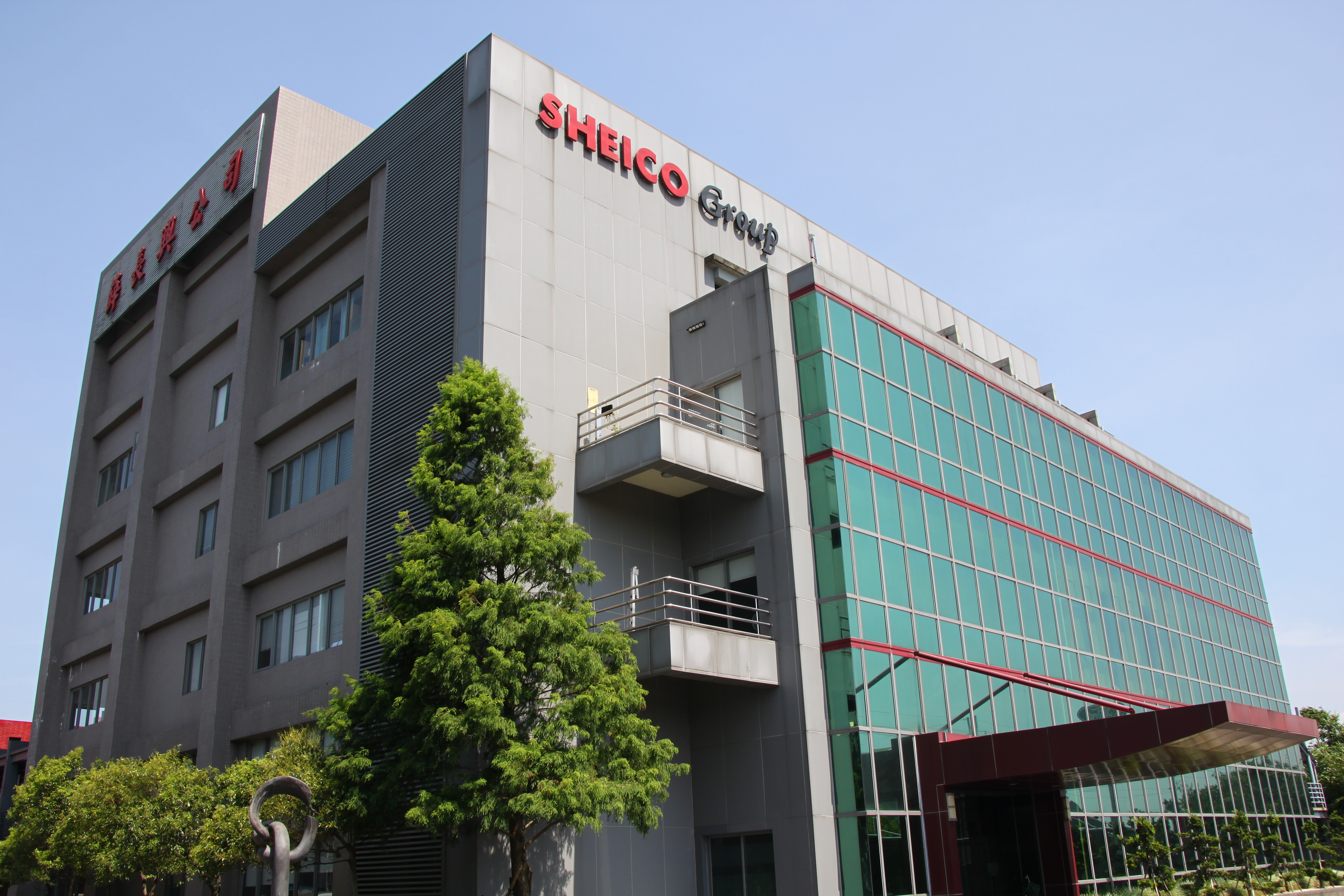
- The headquarters of SHEICO Group, located in Yilan County
- Native name: 薛長興集團
- Founded: 1968
- Headquarters: Wujie, Yilan County, Taiwan
- Website: www.sheico.com

Sheico Group (Chinese: 薛長興集團; pinyin: Xuē Zhǎngxìng Jítuán) is a large OEM supplier of many types of watersports apparel. The company's headquarters is located in Yilan, Taiwan, and its manufacturing facilities are in Taiwan, Vietnam, Thailand and Cambodia. Its customers include global brands such as Billabong, Xcel, Patagonia, and ScubaPro. In 2021, Sheico Group generated $470 Million U.S. Dollars in revenue and has an estimated global market share of 65% in the wetsuit industry.

== Products ==
It manufactures goods include neoprene wetsuits, drysuits, life vests, personal flotation devices, boots, gloves, orthopedic supports and waders. Recently, the company's product line has expanded to functional fabrics as well as sportswear OEM/ODM service.

== History ==
The company was founded in 1968, as a maker of rain gears and rubber boots. By 2014, the company's production accounted for over 60% of global market share.

In the early stages of the company development, the neoprene sheets needed to produce such a line were dearly priced and tightly controlled by a handful of Japanese suppliers. Therefore, the founder, Mr, Pi-goon Shiue, and his son, Min Shiue, were intent on bringing the neoprene in-house. By 1983, the experimentation was a success and the first neoprene production line of the company was established.

In 1996, the company's vertical integration was expanded to create "Shei Heng Hsin Sheiflex Ind. co., Ltd." and began producing spandex yarn. Two spandex manufacturing facilities were established in Taiwan and mainland China. A spandex brand, Sheiflex, is created in order to promote their spandex yarn.

Starting in the second half of 2020, the global COVID pandemic created a surge in outdoor recreation that greatly boosted the demand for wetsuits. Sheico quickly expanded its production to meet the demand and grew its revenue significantly. The company also gave back to the community by donating over US$2 million to build a covered playground complex in the Luodong Sports Park in Yilan, Taiwan.

== See also ==
- List of companies of Taiwan
- Sportswear (activewear)
- Wetsuit
- Neoprene
