= Taiwan Fertilizer =

Fertilizer company of Taiwan

Taiwan Fertilizer Co., Ltd. 台灣肥料股份有限公司
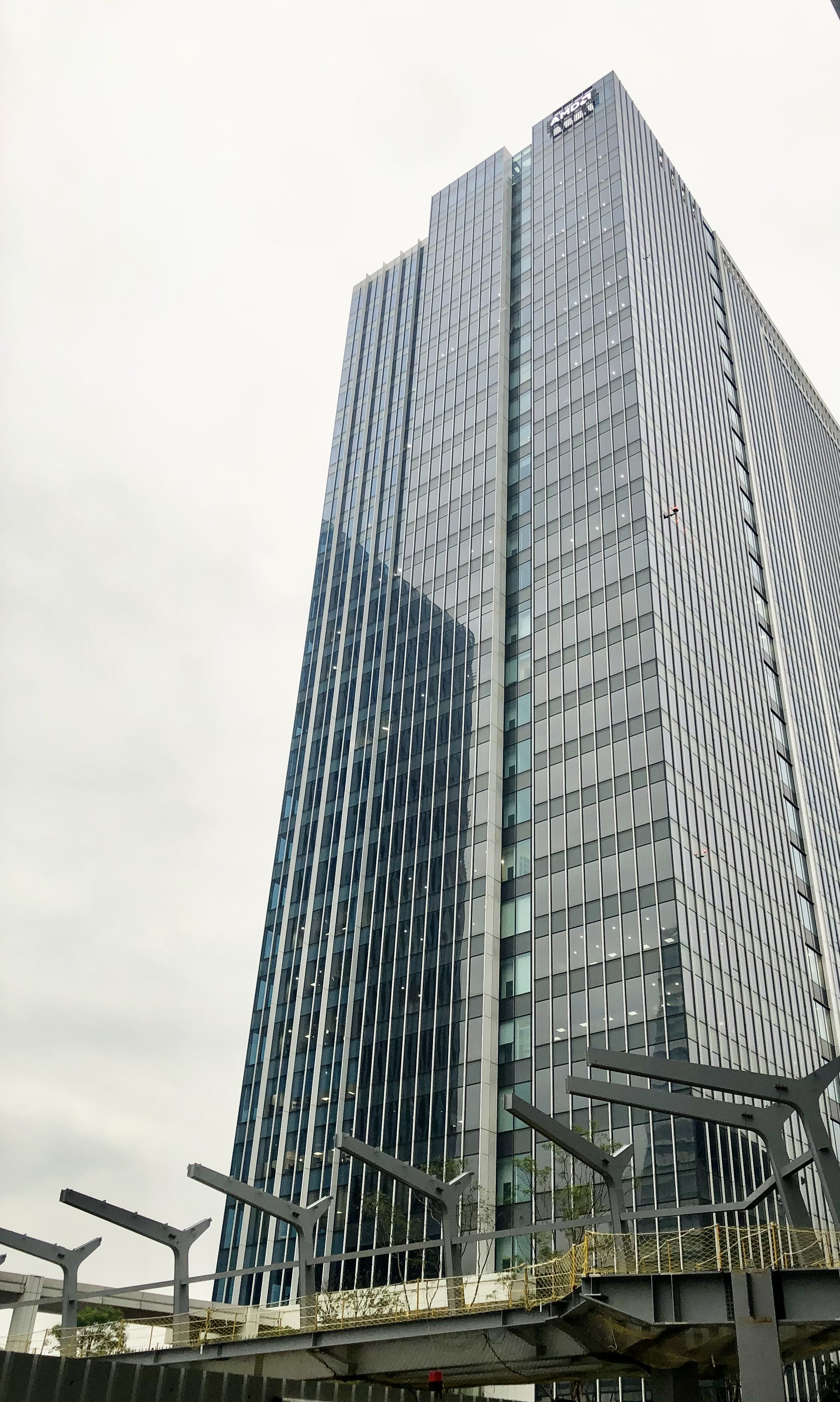
- Industry: fertilizer
- Founded: 1 May 1946; 80 years ago
- Headquarters: Nangang, Taipei, Taiwan
- Website: Official website

The Taiwan Fertilizer Co., Ltd. (TFC; traditional Chinese: 台灣肥料公司; simplified Chinese: 台湾肥料公司; pinyin: Táiwān Féiliào Gōngsī) is a fertilizer company of Taiwan.

== History ==
TFC was established on 1 May 1946 as a state-owned company under the Ministry of Economic Affairs. On 1 September 1999, it was privatized and listed as private corporation. In January 2001, it completed the electronic-class chemical plant supplying chemicals to domestic LCD and semiconductor manufacturers.

== Factories ==
- Keelung
- Miaoli
- Hualien
- Taichung

== Organizations ==
- Administration Department
- Financial Department
- Information Department
- Planning Department
- Business Development Department
- Real Estate Development Department
- Property Management Department
- Sales Department
- Trading Department
- Research and Development Department
- Industrial Safety and Health Department

== Transportation ==
The new company headquarter office Taifer C2 Office Complex is accessible within walking distance of Taipei Nangang Exhibition Center metro station of Taipei Metro.

== See also ==
- List of companies of Taiwan
