= Seventeam Electronics =

Seventeam Electronics Co., Ltd. 七盟電子股份有限公司
- Company type: Private
- Industry: Computer hardware
- Founded: 1986
- Headquarters: Taiwan
- Products: Power supplies
- Website: www.seventeam.com.tw

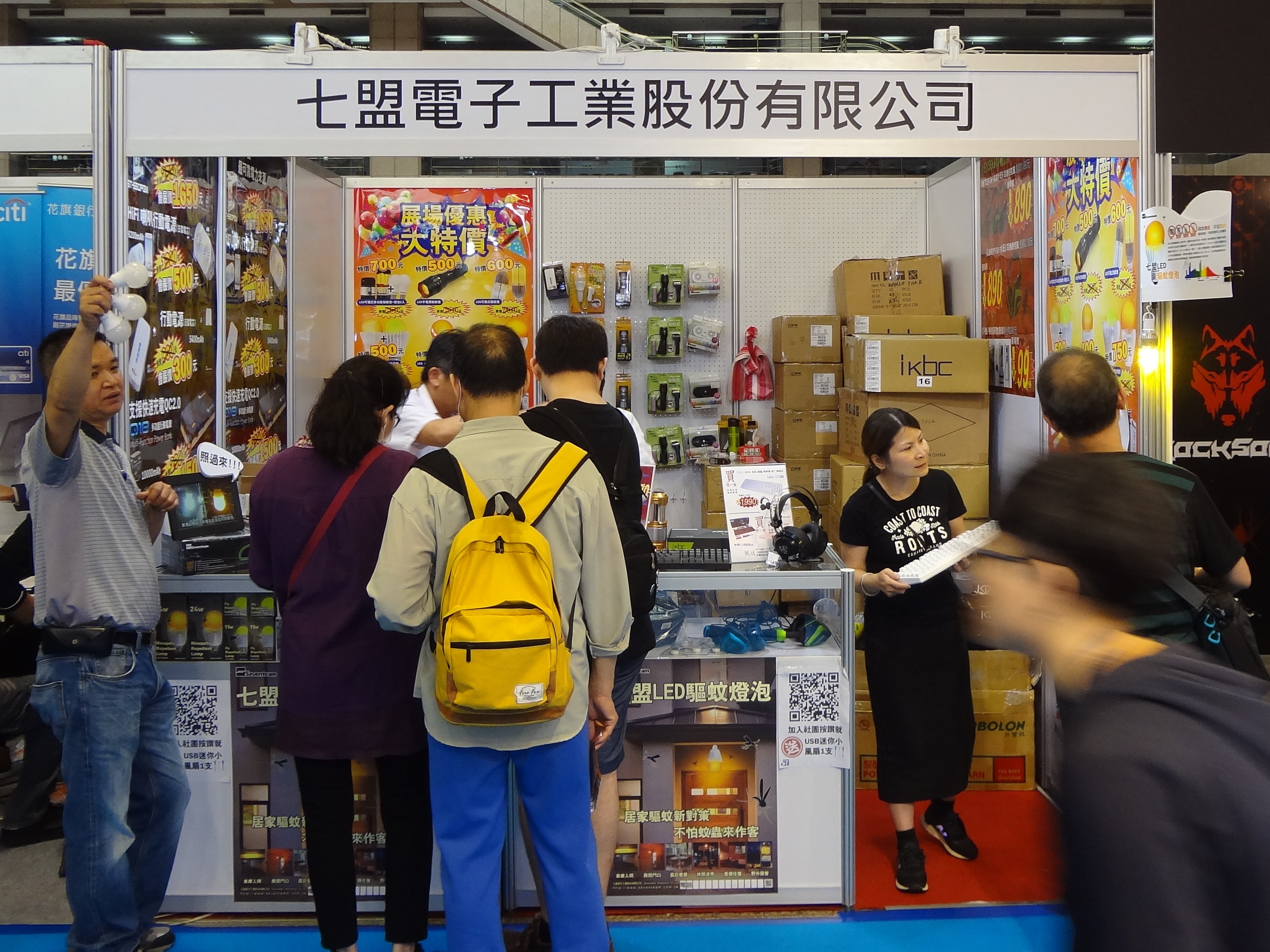
Seventeam Electronics' booth at the 2018 Taipei Spring Computer Show

Seventeam Electronics (Chinese: 七盟電子) is a Taiwanese manufacturer of power supplies for Personal Computer and Industrial PC. Some earlier models from Seventeam were sold by Cooler Master and SilverStone under their own respective brand names.

== See also ==
- List of companies of Taiwan
