= Phalanx Biotech Group =

Multinational biotechnology research organization

- Type: Private
- Industry: Biotechnology; Bioinformatics
- Founded: 2002
- Headquarters: Hsinchu, Taiwan; San Diego, California; Shanghai, China; Beijing, China
- Number of locations: 4
- Area served: Worldwide
- Products: OneArray microarrays Custom microarrays
- Services: Microarray services NGS services Bioinformatics; Custom microarray printing qPCR miRNA profiling
- Number of employees: 200
- Subsidiaries: PhalanxBio, Inc.
- Website: www.phalanxbiotech.com www.onearray.com

Phalanx Biotech Group is a Taiwanese multinational biotechnology company founded in 2002 as a result of collaboration between Taiwan's Industrial Technology Research Institute (ITRI) and several private companies and research institutes. It is a manufacturer of DNA microarrays and a provider of gene expression profiling and microRNA profiling services based in Hsinchu, Taiwan, San Diego, California, Shanghai, China, and in Beijing, China. The company sells its DNA microarrays and service platform under the registered trademark name OneArray.

Phalanx Biotech Group is a member of the FDA-led Microarray Quality Control Project.

== Description of Products and Services ==
Phalanx Biotech Group is a manufacturer and provider of DNA microarray products and services used for gene expression profiling and miRNA profiling.

Human, Mouse, Rat and Yeast whole genome OneArray DNA microarrays are manufactured and used for gene expression profiling products and services.

The miRNA profiling products and services include miRNA OneArray microarrays and related services for Human, Rodent, and many Model organism and Plant species.

Other than the OneArray services, Phalanx also offers Agilent microarray services, qPCR services, PCR array profiling services, and NGS services. Each one of these services can be accompanied by an extensive, customizable bioinformatics package.

== Manufacturing ==
The DNA microarrays are produced using a patented non-contact inkjet deposition of intact oligonucleotides. This is performed using a patented inkjet dispensing apparatus. The oligonucleotides are deposited on a standard size 25mm X 75mm glass slide.

== Milestones ==
Date	Milestone
June 2002	Phalanx Biotech Group, Inc. founded.
April 2004	U.S. subsidiary, PhalanxBio, Inc., founded.
July 2006	Human OneArray Whole Genome DNA Microarray launched.
October 2006	OneArray Service Center and Gene Expression Profiling Service launched.
January 2007	Mouse OneArray Whole Genome DNA Microarray launched.
March 2009	miRNA OneArray microarray products launched.
March 2010	Yeast OneArray Whole Genome DNA Microarray launched.
July 2010	Human OneArray v.5 launched.
October 2010	miRNA OneArray v.2 launched.
December 2010	Mouse OneArray v.2 launched.
March 2011	Rat OneArray Whole Genome DNA Microarray launched.

== See also ==
- List of companies of Taiwan
