= Bank of Kaohsiung =

Public bank of Taiwan

Bank of Kaohsiung 高雄銀行

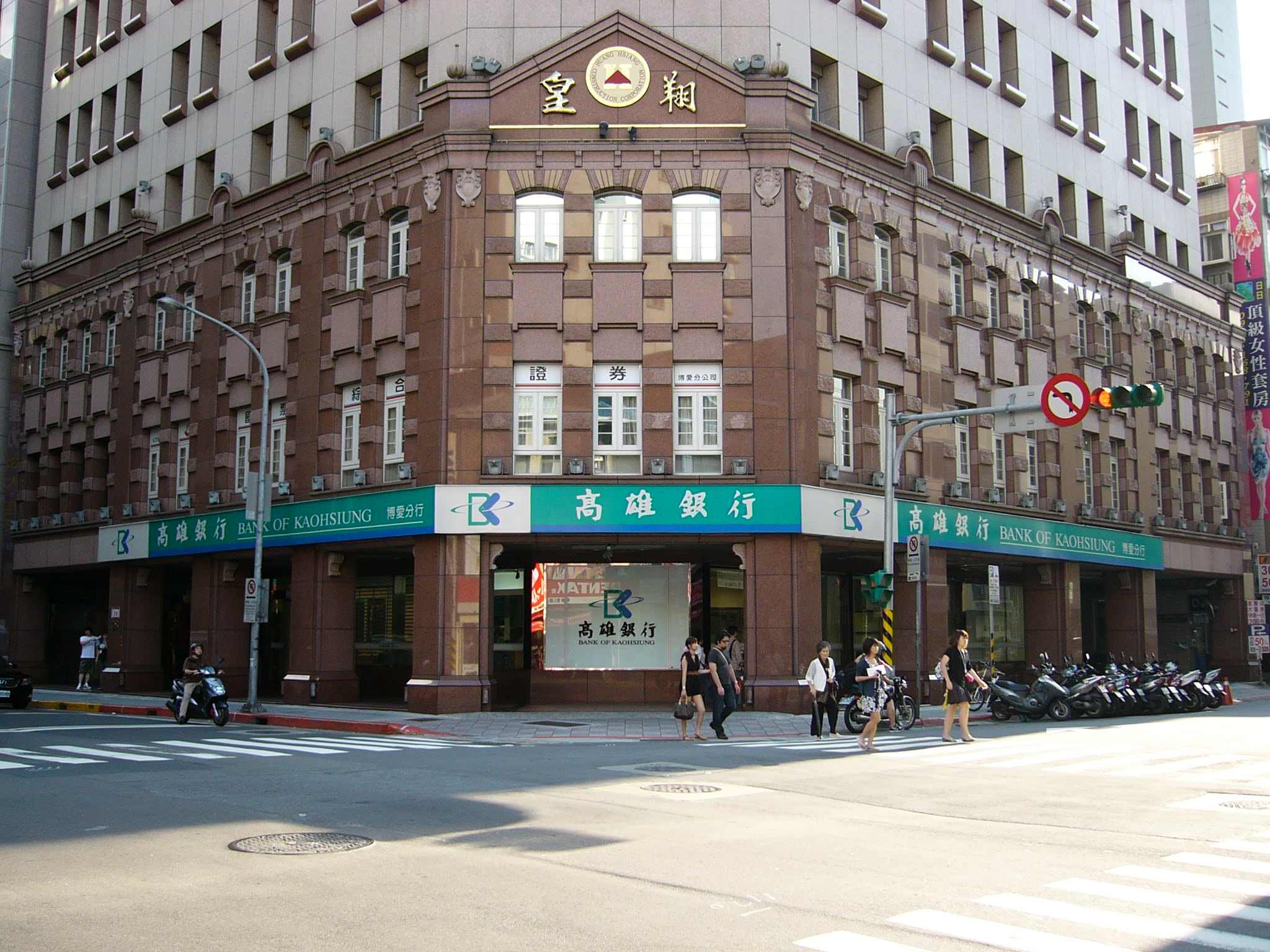
- Po Ai Branch, Bank of Kaohsiung on Bo'ai Road in Taipei City.
- Company type: Public (TSEC:2836)
- Industry: banking
- Founded: 13 January 1982
- Headquarters: Zuoying, Kaohsiung, Taiwan
- Key people: Chien Chen-cheng, Acting Chairman
- Products: financial services
- Total assets: NT$8,232,238,250 (14 October 2016)

The Bank of Kaohsiung (BOK; traditional Chinese: 高雄銀行; simplified Chinese: 高雄银行; pinyin: Gāoxióng Yínháng; Wade–Giles: Kao^{1}-hsiung^{2} Yin^{2}-hang^{2}) is a public bank headquartered in Zuoying District, Kaohsiung, Taiwan.

== History ==
The bank was established on 13 January 1982.

== Organizational structures ==
- Credit Management Department
- Risk Management Department
- Business Management Department
- Treasury Department
- Legal Affairs Department
- Executive Administration Department
- Human Resources Department
- IT Department
- Municipal Treasury Department
- Financial Market Department
- Offshore Banking Unit
- International Banking Department
- Trust Department
- Wealth Management Department

== See also ==
- List of banks in Taiwan
- List of companies of Taiwan
