= EZTABLE =

Online restaurant reservation platform

EZTABLE 簡單桌
- Industry: Internet
- Founded: April 2008
- Founder: Alex Chen, Brooky Yen, Jerry Yen, Peter Hsieh
- Headquarters: Taipei, Taiwan
- Area served: Taiwan, Thailand, Hong Kong, Indonesia
- Products: Online restaurant reservations, CRM, E-commerce
- Website: www.eztable.com

EZTABLE (Chinese: 簡單桌; pinyin: Jiǎndānzhuō) is an online restaurant reservation platform operating in Asia. Founded in Taipei, Taiwan, in April 2008, its mission is to create the world's largest dining program. Similar to OpenTable in the U.S., EZTABLE allows its users to search, reserve, and prepay online. Since its founding, EZTABLE has had over 10,000 restaurants in Taiwan, Hong Kong, Thailand, and Indonesia.

== History ==
EZTABLE was co-founded by Alex Chen, Brooky Yen, Jerry Yen, and Peter Hsieh in April 2008. They were inspired by OpenTable, the online restaurant reservation company in the U.S. They found out that consumers in Asia still made reservations via telephone and decided to start their own online restaurant reservation business in Taiwan.

In August 2008, the website began operations, serving a limited selection of restaurants. EZTABLE focused on online-to-offline (O2O) strategies. EZTABLE opened its first brick-and-mortar store in Taipei’s Nankang Software Park in March 2016. In the store, customers can make reservations, learn about the company’s two apps, and scan QR codes for EZTABLE gift cards.

In 2012, AppWorks, a famous accelerator in Asia, and Rose Park Advisors, an investment firm founded by Harvard Business School professor Clayton M. Christensen and his son Matthew Christensen, invested US$1.5 million in EZTABLE.

In January 2015, the company disclosed that it had raised a US$5 million funding round led by MediaTek, with participation from UMC, food conglomerate I-Mei, AppWorks, and Rose Park Advisors.

In 2016, Japanese hotel and restaurant reservation company LKYU invested US$8.8 million in EZTABLE, and the companies hope to promote tourism between their two countries.

== Services ==
EZTABLE allows users to search for restaurants based on time, location, and cuisine. Customers complete a reservation and prepay for the meal. Users can book restaurants online through the company’s website and on its two applications available for iOS and Android.

== See also ==
- List of companies of Taiwan
- List of websites about food and drink
