= Adly =

Company of Taiwan

Adly Moto is a Taiwanese scooter manufacturer and is owned by the Her Chee Industrial Company Ltd. Adly was founded in 1978 and initially produced motorcycles. It now also produces scooters (petrol and electric) and quad-bikes. Her Chee Industrial Ltd has exclusive manufacturing agreement for high quality LandFighter all-terrain vehicles.

== See also ==
- List of companies of Taiwan
