= Shinfox Energy =

Electricity company of Taiwan

Shinfox Energy Co., Ltd.
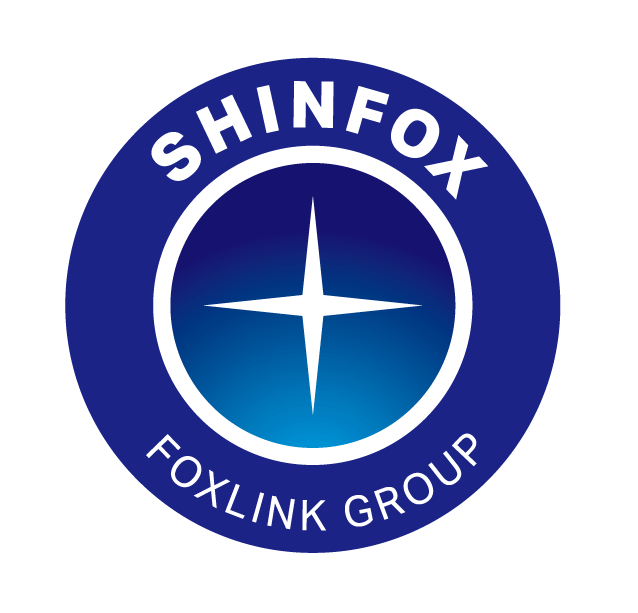
- Native name: 森崴能源
- Romanized name: Sēnwǎi Néngyuán
- Traded as: TWSE: 6806
- Industry: energy
- Headquarters: Tucheng, New Taipei, Taiwan
- Website: Official website

Shinfox Energy Co., Ltd. (Chinese: 森崴能源; pinyin: Sēnwǎi Néngyuán) is an energy company of Taiwan and a subsidiary of Foxlink Group. Its subsidiaries include Foxwell Energy Corporation Ltd., Foxwell Power Co., Ltd., and Shinfox Far East Pte Ltd. Shinfox Energy specializes in renewable energy development and offshore wind farm construction and operations.

It currently operates two onshore wind farms with a total installed capacity of 28.8MW. Shinfox's wholly owned subsidiary, Foxwell Energy, was contracted by Taiwan Power Company for the TPC Offshore Wind Farm Phase 2. It will install 31 Vestas wind turbines (9.5MW) with a total of 294.5MW in installed capacity. Shinfox Energy took the top spot in the Round 3.2 auction in July 2024 and was awarded rights to develop the 700MW Youde wind farm by the Ministry of Economic Affairs.

In addition to renewable energy, Shinfox Energy and its parent company, Foxlink, established a joint venture with Ubitus K.K. The joint venture, named Ubilink, built the largest AI supercomputing center in Taiwan in 2024.

== History ==
Shinfox was established on 27 April 2007 as a subsidiary of Taiwan Cogeneration Corporation. With additional investments from the Foxlink group, it expanded into renewable energy development and green electricity trading. Shinfox Energy is now listed on Taiwan Stock Exchange (TWSE) and its stock code is 6806. Shinfox Energy's subsidiary Foxwell Power (stock code: 6994) is expected to be listed on TWSE in early 2025. It is a major supplier of renewable energy certificates (RECs) for companies such as ASE Group, Foxconn, Wistron, Delta Electronics, and Chunghwa Telecom.

== Transportation ==
The company headquarter office is accessible within walking distance north east from Dingpu Station of Taipei Metro.

== See also ==
- Electricity sector in Taiwan
- List of companies of Taiwan
