= FSP Group =

Taiwanese electronics company

FSP GROUP INC.
- Native name: 全漢企業股份有限公司
- Type: Public
- Traded as: TWSE: 3015
- Industry: Computer
- Founded: 1993
- Headquarters: Taiwan
- Products: Adapter; Personal Computer Power Supply; Industrial PC Power Supply (IPC PSU); Immersion Cooling Power Supply; CRPS and M-CRPS; Medical Power Supply; Open Frame Power Supply; Panel Mount Power Supply; Battery Charger; Energy Storage System; PV Inverter; Uninterruptible Power System; PSU plus BBU; Solid-State Lighting Power Supply; Display PSU
- Number of employees: 5182
- Website: www.fsp-group.com www.fsplifestyle.com

FSP Technology Inc. (FSP Group) is a leading global power supply unit (PSU) manufacturer headquartered in Taoyuan City, Taiwan. Established in 1993, the company built its foundation on PC power supplies and has since diversified into industrial, server, medical, telecommunications, and renewable energy systems.

History & Strategic Transformation

From its inception, FSP partnered with global tech giants like Intel to define industry-standard PSU specifications. As computing technology evolved, the company shifted its focus toward developing high-power-density and digital power control solutions.

In the 2020s, driven by the explosive growth of artificial intelligence, FSP pivoted its R&D toward AI infrastructure power solutions, specifically targeting the demands of Edge AI and Generative AI hardware. Its current portfolio includes efficient power management systems designs, with uses ranging from data center servers to edge devices.

Core Values & Sustainability

Guided by its brand slogan, "Power Never Ends," FSP emphasizes power stability and continuous R&D innovation. In line with global net-zero emission trends, the company integrates ESG principles into its core business by maximizing energy conversion efficiency, holding numerous 80 PLUS certifications, to minimize the carbon footprint of electronic devices.

Core Products & Business Segments

FSP Group specializes in the R&D and manufacturing of comprehensive power solutions. Our product portfolio is strategically categorized across the following key application sectors:

- Data Center & Networking Power Supply: Features CRPS-compliant server power supplies tailored specifically for high-performance AI servers, networking equipment, and hyperscale data centers.
- Industrial Power Systems: Provides robust, embedded power supplies engineered for Edge AI computing, industrial automation, and mission-critical medical devices.
- Energy Management Systems: Covers cutting-edge microgrid technologies, Energy Storage Systems (ESS), solar inverters, and Uninterruptible Power Supplies (UPS).
- Consumer Electronics Power Supply: Includes high-efficiency PC power supplies (PSUs), USB-PD fast chargers, and versatile external power adapters.

== History ==
- 1993: Formally incorporated in April, initially focusing on OEM/ODM manufacturing and power supply trading.
- 1995: Partnered with Intel to launch the world's first ATX Form Factor power supply (ATX 235W).
- 1997: Designated as a seed partner by Intel.
- 2000: Completed and inaugurated the global headquarters in Taoyuan, Taiwan.
- 2002: Formally listed on the Taiwan Stock Exchange (TWSE) on October 16.
- 2003: Entered the LCD TV Open Frame power supply market; launched the FSP retail brand to enter the consumer market.
- 2004: Successfully integrated LLC resonant topology into PC power supply R&D.
- 2005: Made a strategic investment in US-based 3Y Power Technology Inc. to boost industrial power R&D, entering the high-end 500W to 3,200W market. Completed the Active PFC architecture and began providing OEM services for global retail brands.
- 2006: Attained laboratory certifications from CSA, TÜV, TMP, and TDAP.
- 2007: Acquired Protek Power to integrate R&D for medical and industrial power supplies.
- 2008: Made a strategic investment in Voltronic Power Technology Corp. to enrich the Uninterruptible Power Supply (UPS) product line.
- 2009: Developed the proprietary, patented MIA IC™ chipset.
- 2010: Developed the FSP450-60PTM, the world’s first 80 PLUS Platinum-certified power supply.
- 2011: Utilized proprietary MIA IC™ technology to launch the AURUM series.
- 2012: Released the RAIDER series, a single-rail PC power supply.
- 2013: Developed the world’s smallest 65W laptop adapter. Surpassed 400 registered global patents.
- 2017: Constructed and inaugurated a new R&D building in Taoyuan, Taiwan.
- 2018: Pioneered the world's first liquid-cooled power supply; officially entered the 5G power supply market.
- 2019: Expanded into the battery charger industry; fully transitioned product lines to comply with the IEC 62368-1 safety standard.
- 2020: Commenced construction of the Taoyuan Plant 3.
- 2021: Completed and inaugurated the Taoyuan Plant 3.
- 2023: Completed the Vietnam manufacturing facility and commenced mass production.
- 2024: Secured IATF 16949 certification for battery charger products.

== Awards & Recognitions ==
- 2012: AURUM CM, AURUM Xilenser, and NB Q90 PLUS honored with the Taiwan Excellence Award.
- 2016: EMERGY 1000/3000 Green Energy Storage Series won the Taiwan Excellence Award.
- 2020: DAGGER PRO 650W secured the "Must Have" Award from tech authority TweakTown.
- 2020: HYDRO G PRO 850W received the "Worth Buying" Award from tech authority KitGuru.
- 2020: CMT510 Plus garnered the "Diamond" Award from GND-Tech.
- 2022: HYDRO PTM PRO 850W won the Product Gold Award.
- 2022: Certified as an "Outstanding Sports Enterprise" (2021).
- 2022: Honored with the Taoyuan Golden Enterprise Excellence Award (2021).
- 2023: Hydro Ti PRO selected for the prestigious "Best Choice Award."
- 2023: Named among Business Weekly’s "Top 100 Carbon Competitive Enterprises."
- 2024: Recognized as a Family-Friendly Workplace for Childcare Initiatives.
- 2024: Ranked in the top 5% among mid-cap listed companies in Taiwan.
- 2024: Awarded the EcoVadis Bronze Medal in the global corporate sustainability assessment.
- 2024: Awarded the "DEI Age-Friendly Employer Award," setting a new benchmark for workplace inclusion.
- 2024: Named one of the "Top 100 Age-Friendly Enterprises" jointly by Business Weekly and 104 Job Bank.
- 2025: Ranked in Business Weekly’s "Top 100 Age-Inclusive Enterprises."
- 2025: Won the "Diversified & Inclusive Vision Silver Award" and the "Best Cross-Generational Inclusion Special Award."
- 2025: Certified as a Taoyuan Age-Friendly Enterprise for middle-aged and senior workers.
- 2025: Honored as a "2025 Sustainable Health Workforce Pioneer Enterprise."
- 2025: Recognized as a Taoyuan Family-Friendly/Childcare Exemplary Enterprise.

== See also ==
- List of companies of Taiwan
