= TECO Electric and Machinery =

Taiwanese electronics company

TECO Electric & Machinery Co., Ltd.
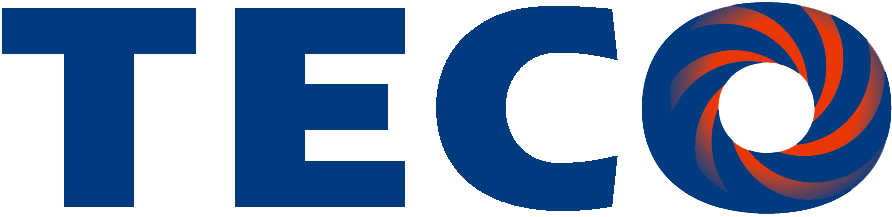
- Type: Public
- Traded as: TWSE: 1504
- Industry: Electronics
- Founded: 12 June 1956
- Headquarters: Nangang District, Taipei, Taiwan
- Products: Electric motors, servo drives, air conditioners
- Website: www.teco.com.tw

TECO Electric & Machinery Co. (Chinese: 東元電機股份有限公司; pinyin: Dōngyuán Diàn Jī Gǔfèn Yǒuxiàn Gōngsī) is a Taiwanese company specializing in the manufacture of industrial electric motors. The company also manufactures and installs various electrical and mechanical equipments such as telecommunication equipment and home appliances.

== History ==
Taiwan Electric Company (TECO) was established in 1956. In 1988, TECO began a joint venture with Westinghouse Electric to form Westinghouse Motor Company (WMC), with factories in Texas, Taiwan, and Malaysia. TECO purchased all of Westinghouse's shares of WMC in 1995, later renaming the company to TECO-Westinghouse Motor Company (TWMC). In 1989, TECO Industry Malaysia was founded.

In 2025, TECO acquired Malaysian electromechanical engineering company NCL and its renewable energy subsidiary, NCL Green Energy Sdn Bhd.

== See also ==
- List of companies of Taiwan
