= Asia Cement =

South Korean manufacturing company

Asia Cement Co. Ltd. (Korean: 아세아시멘트) is South Korea's cement, concrete, and chemical company headquartered in Seoul, Korea. Established in 1957, the company primarily produces remicon and portland cement. Asia Cement Co., Ltd. is one of the three largest cement manufacturing companies in Korea.

In 2018, which marked the company's 62nd anniversary, it acquired HALLA Cement Corp. from Lafarge Cement Co. Asia Cement is the nation's key industrial, manufacturing company with 1,000 employees and annual production capacity of 15 million tons of cement and 3.6 million cubic meters of ready-mixed concrete. Headquartered in Gangnam, Seoul, it oversees 9 branch factories and service stations located in Jechon, Anyang, Suwon, Yongin, Daejun and Daegu as well as ten remicon manufacturing factories.

Halla Cement, a subsidiary, operates its main factory in Ganagneung and slag cement factories in Gwangyang, Pohang, and Incheon. It also manages nine service stations throughout the country.

The company owns the most productive limestone mine in Korea, projected to last for the next 200 years.

== Current management status ==
Asia Cement Co., Ltd. manufactures and sells cement, remicon, and dry mortar, the three major construction materials.

Production was increased with the introduction of a total productive maintenance system in the main factory and in branches. The manufacturing cost was reduced by the reuse of waste material at the Jechon Factory, which is fully equipped with recycling facilities.

In 2017, the company increased its annual sales to about 461 billion won and net income to 55 billion won. Overall, the Asia Group, including all subsidiaries in industries of cement, paper, amusement park and venture capital recorded annual sales of 1,197 billion won and net income of 73 billion won and 1,816 billion won in total assets.

== Subsidiaries ==
Halla Cement Corp. and Asia Industry Development Co., Ltd. manufacture cement-related products and aggregates.

Subsidiaries also include Asia Paper Manufacturing Co., the largest industrial paper producer in Korea, and Jeil Industry, a producer of cardboards. Other paper-related subsidiaries are Yujin Paper and A-Pack and Kyung-San paper.

It also owns and operates Gyeongju world resort, an amusement theme park in the Youngnam region, and Wooshin Development Finance Co. Ltd., a venture capital investment firm.

== See also ==
- Economy of South Korea
