= Wiwynn =

Taiwanese technology company

Wiwynn Corporation

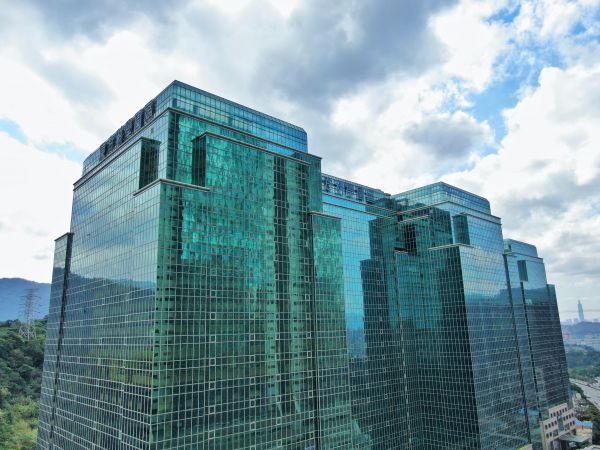
- Wiwynn headquarters in Taiwan
- Trade name: 緯穎科技、Wiwynn
- Native name: 緯穎科技
- Company type: Public
- Traded as: TWSE: 6669
- Industry: Electronics
- Founded: March 3, 2012 （14 years, 105 days）
- Founder: Simon Lin
- Headquarters: Taipei, Taiwan
- Key people: Emily Hong (Chair and CSO)
- Products: Cloud Infrastructure Products
- Services: Cloud Infrastructure design, manufacturing, and after-sales support services
- Revenue: ▲US$7.13 billion (2023)
- Operating income: ▲US$430.1 million (2023)
- Net income: ▲US$457.67 million (2023)
- Total assets: US$3.2 billion (2023)
- Total equity: US$1.8 billion (2023)
- Number of employees: 7,257 (2023)
- Parent: Wistron
- Capital ratio: 20.2 (2023)
- Website: www.wiwynn.com

Wiwynn Corporation (TWSE: 6669) is a Taiwanese company specializing in the design, manufacturing, and delivery of cloud infrastructure products, including servers, storage systems, and networking equipment. Founded in 2012 as a subsidiary of Wistron Corporation, Wiwynn became a supplier of cloud and data center infrastructure products, serving hyperscale cloud providers and enterprise customers globally.

Wiwynn partnered with IBM to enhance its infrastructure using IBM Spectrum Scale and IBM Elastic Storage Server (ESS), efficiently managing and scaling its data storage capabilities to meet growing customer demands.

In 2023, Wiwynn's strategic positioning in the AI server market, particularly in response to the rising demand from cloud service providers like Meta, Microsoft, and AWS, accounted for nearly 50% of global server procurement, highlighting Wiwynn's key role in the industry.

Wiwynn has also been at the forefront of adopting NVIDIA's latest technology. In 2024, Wiwynn showcased its AI computing solutions based on the NVIDIA GB200 NVL72 system at the NVIDIA GTC 2024 conference. The GB200 system, featuring the Grace Blackwell Superchip, delivers improvements in AI model inference speed, power efficiency, and scalability, according to the StorageReview blog.

In 2024, Wiwynn was recognized by TIME magazine as one of the world's most sustainable companies, ranking #416 globally and #15 in Taiwan.
