= Pinkoi =

Taiwanese e-commerce platform

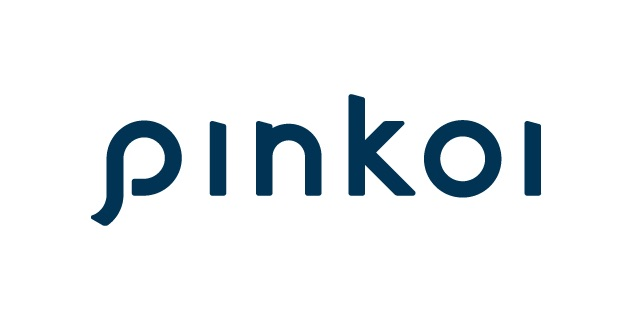
- Website type: E-commerce, mobile commerce, cross-border marketplace, design goods marketplace
- Available in: Traditional Chinese, Simplified Chinese, Japanese, Thai, English
- Owner: Pinkoi (HK) Limited
- Creators: Peter Yen, Mike Lee, Maibelle Lin
- Website: pinkoi.com
- Commercial: Yes
- Registration: Required to buy or sell. Additional selection process required for opening a store.
- Launched: 2011; 15 years ago
- Current status: Active

Pinkoi is a Taiwanese e-commerce platform focused on the sale of original design goods in East Asia and Southeast Asia, based in Taipei. It was founded by Peter Yen, Mike Lee and Maibelle Lin in 2011.

In March 2016, Pinkoi acquired iichi, a Japanese handicraft e-commerce platform. Pinkoi became iichi’s top shareholder. iichi’s other shareholders are Hakuhodo and Hakuhodo DY Media Partners. In August 2017, Pinkoi announced its official launch in Thailand. The site is currently available in Traditional Chinese, Simplified Chinese, Japanese, Thai, and English.

In April 2020, Pinkoi launched Pinkoi for Business, a one-stop online wholesale solution targeted at buyers, wholesalers, retailers, and importers in the design industry. Pinkoi for Business provides market sales data along with cross-border logistics, payment, and customs duties solutions that assist in the product curation and buying process.

Pinkoi for Business uses data from Pinkoi’s global marketplace, which has sold over 10 million products worldwide, to identify the top vendors and trending products in categories such as home decor, accessories, pet supplies, stationery, beauty, electronics, and kitchen tableware.

Pinkoi for Business serves established design retailers like Design Within Reach (a subsidiary of Herman Miller Inc.), Tsutaya Books, LOFT, Siam Discovery, National Gallery of Art, etc.
