= Albatron Technology =

Albatron Technology Co., Ltd.
- Native name: 青雲國際科技股份有限公司
- Company type: Public company
- Traded as: TWSE: 5386
- Industry: IT industry
- Founded: 1984; 42 years ago
- Headquarters: New Taipei, Taiwan
- Key people: CEO: Jack Ko chairman of the board: Ke Tsung-Yuan; President: Luu Yang-Kai; Vice President: Feng Chih-Kun
- Products: Motherboards, graphics cards, computer peripherals and accessories
- Revenue: ▼US$2,922 million (2011)
- Number of employees: 60
- Website: www.albatron.com.tw

Albatron Technology Co. Ltd. (Chinese: 青雲國際科技股份有限公司) is a Taiwan-based company, primarily known for being a major manufacturer of graphics cards and motherboards based on NVIDIA chipsets in the 2000s that were marketed under the brand Albatron.

== History ==
The company began in 1984 as Chun Yun Electronics, TVs and markets. It was renamed "Albatron Technology" in 2002 and expanded its range of products. The company started making generic "noname" branded technology hardware, and started to brand its products after the name change to Albatron.

The company once had a small market share in consumer computer hardware aftermarket, but now only manufactures peripherals and accessories for consumers as their graphics cards and motherboards manufacturing is now aimed at industrial users only.

== Location ==
The company's headquarters are located in New Taipei, Taiwan since 2002. The trading company has more than 60 distributors worldwide, and 4% of its revenues were invested in research and development.

== See also ==
- Elitegroup Computer Systems (ECS)
- Gigabyte Technology
- Micro-Star International (MSI)
- ASRock
