= Proton Electronic =

Taiwanese electronics company

Proton Electronic Industrial Co., Ltd. (Chinese: 普騰電子工業股份有限公司) is a Taiwanese company founded in 1964. The company's line of business includes the manufacturing of radio and television consumer electronics equipment.

== History ==
Proton was founded in 1964 as an importer of hi-fi equipment. They moved into manufacturing in 1970 and OEM manufacturing in 1975. In 1975 parent company Fulet Electronic Industrial Company Ltd. was founded to manage the increasingly complex operations. In 1985 the company employed more than 900 people and had an R&D department of 85.

In 2003 Proton Electronic formed a joint venture with the Chinese TV manufacturer Tsinghua Tongfang (清華同方) to gain exposure to the vast Chinese television market. Chinese growth at the time was driven by a government program which aimed to have all sets capable of receiving digital broadcasts by 2010.
