= Hi-VAWT =

Taiwanese renewable energy solutions provider

Hi-VAWT Technology Corp. Ltd.
- Industry: Manufacturing
- Founded: 2005 as Hi-Energy Technology Corp. Ltd., renamed in 2009
- Headquarters: Linkou District, New Taipei City, Taiwan
- Area served: Worldwide
- Key people: Jacken Chen, General Manager
- Products: Small wind turbines, solar panels, hybrid streetlights
- Owner: Michael Chen
- Number of employees: 50
- Website: hi-vawt.com.tw

Hi-VAWT is a renewable energy equipment manufacturer headquartered in Linkou District, New Taipei City, Taiwan. Hi-VAWT has installations in many countries/territories worldwide (Taiwan, China, Japan, South Korea, Hong Kong, India, Malaysia, Australia, New Zealand, South Africa, Spain, Austria, Czech Republic, Italy, Germany, Poland, Guam, Hawaii, the USA, Jamaica and Canada), and on every continent including Antarctica. The company also a member of Taiwan Wind Turbine Industry Association.

Hi-VAWT's turbines utilize a combined Darrieus and Savonius wind turbine. Savonius turbine is a drag-type wind turbine that perform well under low-wind speed condition, while Darrieus turbine is a lift-type wind turbine that perform best at high-wind speed condition. The vertical axis allowing the turbine to take wind from all directions simultaneously. While the combo-blades provide a self-starting performance while maintain a good working condition in higher wind speed situation.

== Locations ==
Hi-VAWT business organization was started and is headquartered in Linkou District, New Taipei City, Taiwan. The company also has offices/distributors in China, South Korea, Japan and the US, which serve those individual regional markets.

== Products ==
Hi-VAWT’s services including vertical axis wind turbines (ranges from 300 to 3000 watts system), solar panels and hybrid street lights system. The DS-3000 wind turbine system currently is the only vertical axis wind turbine system that has been certified by Nippon Kaiji Kyokai and qualify for Feed-in tariff application in Japan and Taiwan.

In May 2019, DS3000 also certified by Small Wind Certification Council, which means that the turbine qualified for various Feed-in-Tariff or other rebate programs in the USA.

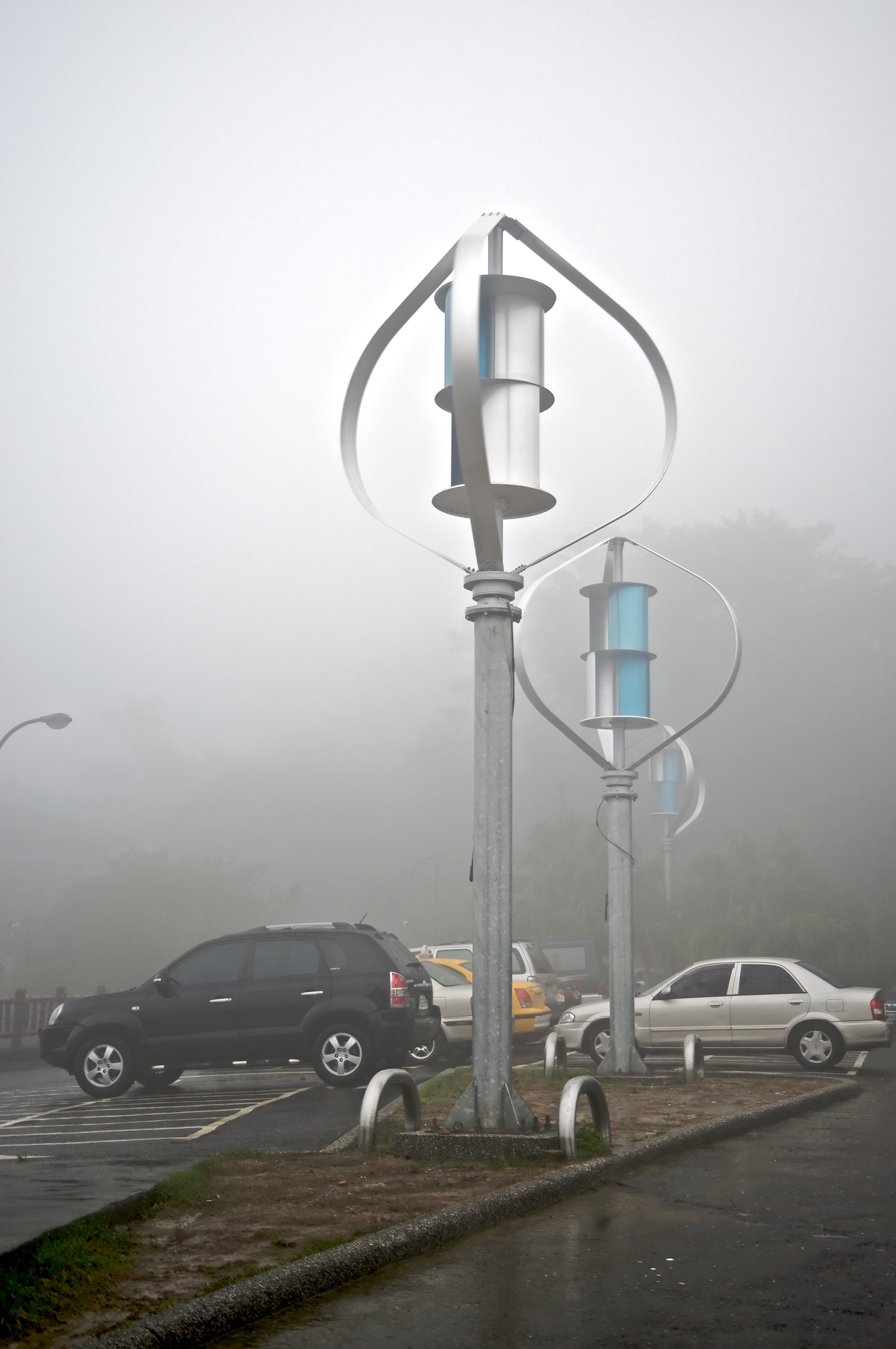
Hi-VAWT wind turbine installation in Taiwan

== See also ==
- Wind power
- Renewable energy in Taiwan
- Electricity sector in Taiwan
