= Edison-Opto =

- Type: Public
- Industry: Optoelectronics
- Founded: 2001
- Headquarters: Zhonghe, New Taipei, Taiwan
- Key people: Jason Wu (CEO)
- Products: LED Lighting, Optical SPDIF, Opto Sensor
- Number of employees: 734
- Website: www.edison-opto.com.tw

Edison Opto Corporation (Chinese: 艾笛森光電股份有限公司; pinyin: Àidísēn Guāngdiàn Gǔfèn Yǒuxiàn Gōngsī) is a global leading high power LED manufacturer, established in October, 2001 based in Taipei, Taiwan.

== Overview ==
Edison Opto Corporation is principally engaged in the research, manufacture and distribution of high power light-emitting diodes (LEDs). Edison Opto's major products include high power LED components and modules, applied to lighting equipment, such as portable products lighting, special lighting, building lighting, commercial lighting and outdoor lighting; Datalink, used as digital music and signal transmission interface for acoustic systems, mobile phones and personal computers (PC) mainboards, and opto sensors, applied for digital cameras and personal digital assistants (PDAs), among others.

In 2011, Edison Opto created the LDMS service program, which integrates the four essential technologies in LED lighting applications (Thermal Management, Electrical Scheme, Mechanical Refinement and Optical Optimization). In aspect of quality policy, Edison Opto established a photometric testing and product safety laboratory which was certified by UL.

== History ==
Edison Opto Corporation was established in October 2001 and received its RoHS certificate in August 2005. Dongguang Edison Opto was established in July 2006. Yangzhou Edison Opto was established September 2009.

Edison has been listed in Forbes Asia's 200 Best Companies Under A Billion in 2010. In the fourth quarter of 2010 IPO in Taiwan Stock Exchange. The starting year of LDMS business was quarter one of 2011. Certificate Approved EPA LM80 Approved Lab was received in the fourth quarter of 2011. Certificate Approved UL Safety Approved Lab was received September 2012.

== Major Products ==
- Opto Sensor
- Optical SPDIF
- LED Lighting devices and modules.

== See also ==
- Everlight Electronics
