= Kdan Mobile =

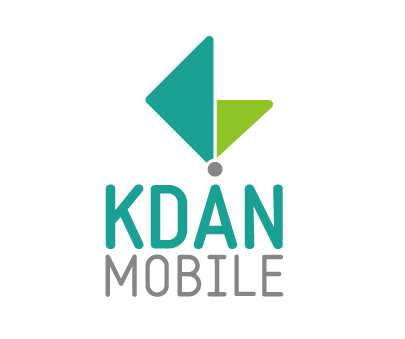
- Native name: 凱鈿行動科技股份有限公司
- Company type: Private
- Industry: Software industry
- Founded: 2009
- Founder: Kenny Su
- Headquarters: Tainan, Taiwan
- Number of employees: 300 worldwide (2022)
- Website: www.kdanmobile.com

Kdan Mobile Software Limited is a software application development company based in Tainan City, Taiwan. Kdan also has branches in Taipei, Changsha, Irvine, California, Japan, and South Korea. The company was founded in 2009 by Kenny Su, the company's CEO.

== History ==
Kdan Mobile was founded in 2009 by Kenny Su (蘇柏州) and develops an application for PDF documents. Su previously worked at the Industrial Technology Research Institute (ITRI) .

In 2018, the company completed its Series B round of fundraising, in which it raised 16 million USD in total. Four global firms, Dattoz Partners (South Korea), WI Harper Group (U.S.), Taiwania Capital (Taiwan), and Golden Asia Fund Mitsubishi UFJ Capital (Japan), made up the Series B investment. Kdan previously raised 5 million USD in its Series A round in 2018.
