= Super Flower =

Taiwanese company

Super Flower Computer Inc. 振華電腦有限公司
- Company type: Private
- Industry: Computer hardware
- Founded: 1991; 35 years ago
- Headquarters: Xinzhuang, New Taipei, Taiwan
- Products: Power supplies Computer cases
- Website: super-flower.com.tw

Super Flower Computer Inc. (Chinese: 振華電腦有限公司; pinyin: Zhènhuá diànnǎo yǒuxiàn gōngsī) is a Taiwanese company founded in 1991 that manufactures power supplies, enclosures, and related components for personal computers and servers.

They are best known for their computer power supplies, which are sold under other brand names as well as their own, and which have gained a reputation for high quality in the marketplace.

== ATX power supplies ==
During the 2010s, Super Flower's reputation for high quality 80 plus rated computer power supplies has been commented upon by a wide range of analyst and hardware review websites. Numerous Gold, Platinum and Titanium rated products based on their Leadex platform (also used as the OEM platform for EVGA's Supernova power supplies) have gained 10/10, or close to 10/10, in reviews, and accolades for consistent and outstanding performance and build quality.

In reviewing Super Flower's 1600W T2 Titanium rated in 2015, PSU review website JonnyGuru.com and TechPowerup both state that Titanium power supplies had such high specifications that only small number were listed at 80 Plus (18 in the first review and "very few" in the second), and of those, Super Flower accounted for a third of the Titanium models listed and was the only manufacturer to have a range rather than a single model at Titanium specification. In reviewing Super Flower's 2000W Platinum 8pack edition power supply, hexus.net commented it was the first consumer power supply of that size to be produced.
