= Vibo A688 =

Touchscreen smartphone

- Manufacturer: Foxconn
- Type: Slate form smartphone
- Compatible networks: UMTS/HSPA 850/1900/2100, GSM/GPRS/EDGE 850/900/1800/1900
- Dimensions: 56.8×114.9×12.6 mm (2.24×4.52×0.50 in)
- Weight: 114.4 g (4.04 oz)
- Operating system: Android v1.6
- CPU: 600 MHz Qualcomm MSM7227 processor
- Memory: RAM: 256MB, ROM: 512MB
- Storage: microSD slot: supports up to 32 GB
- Battery: Standard battery, Li-ion 1230 mAh, stand-by: up to 250 h, talk time: up to 3 h
- Rear camera: 5.0 megapixel with autofocus
- Display: 320 x 480 px, 3.2 in (81 mm), TFT LCD, HVGA
- Connectivity: Wi-Fi (802.11b/g), Bluetooth 2.0, ExtUSB, A-GPS
- Data inputs: Capacitive touchscreen, virtual keyboard

The Vibo A688 is a touchscreen smartphone released for the Vibo Telecom network on 18 January 2010. It runs the Google Android software, and is manufactured by Foxconn.

== Specifications ==
The specifications according to the Vibo website in October 2010:

=== Hardware ===
- Screen size: 3.2 in.
- Screen resolution: HVGA (320 x 480 pixels)
- Weight: 114.4g
- Size: 56.8 x 114.9 x 12.6 mm
- Input devices: touchscreen
- Battery: 1230 mAh Li-ion
- Talk time: 180 min
- Standby time: up to 250 hrs
- Processor: 600 MHz
- RAM: 256 MB
- ROM: 512 MB
- Memory: up to 32 GB microSD
- Wi-Fi, 802.11b/g
- Bluetooth 2.0
- GPS/AGPS receiver
- Accelerometer
- Proximity sensor
- Digitcal compass
- 5 megapixels camera

=== Applications ===
Users may customize their phones by installing apps through the Android Market. Preinstalled applications are:

- 800 radio telephone
- Android Market
- Games
- Google Talk
- Google Maps
- Google Calendar
- Gmail
- MuchMarts digital market
- iMarket digital market
- YouTube
- Widgets: Weather, stock prices, RSS

== Clones ==
Vibo A688 was sold in various countries under several different names: Apanda A60, Chinavision Excalibur, Cincinnati Bell Blaze, Commtiva Z71, Gigabyte Gsmart G1305, Motorola Quench XT5 (XT502), Muchtel A1, Nexian Journey, Optimus Boston, Orange Boston, Spice Mi-300, Cherry Mobile Nova and Wellcom A88.

== See also ==
- Galaxy Nexus
- List of Android devices
