= Taiwan Mobile =

Taiwanese telecommunications company

Taiwan Mobile Co., Ltd. 台灣大哥大股份有限公司
- Type: Public
- Traded as: TWSE: 3045
- Industry: Telecommunications; Mobile Communications
- Founded: 25 February 1997; 29 years ago
- Headquarters: Xinyi, Taipei, Taiwan
- Area served: Taiwan
- Key people: Richard Tsai, Chairman
- Products: Mobile services Data services
- Number of employees: 8,268 (2019)
- Parent: Fubon Group
- Website: english.taiwanmobile.com

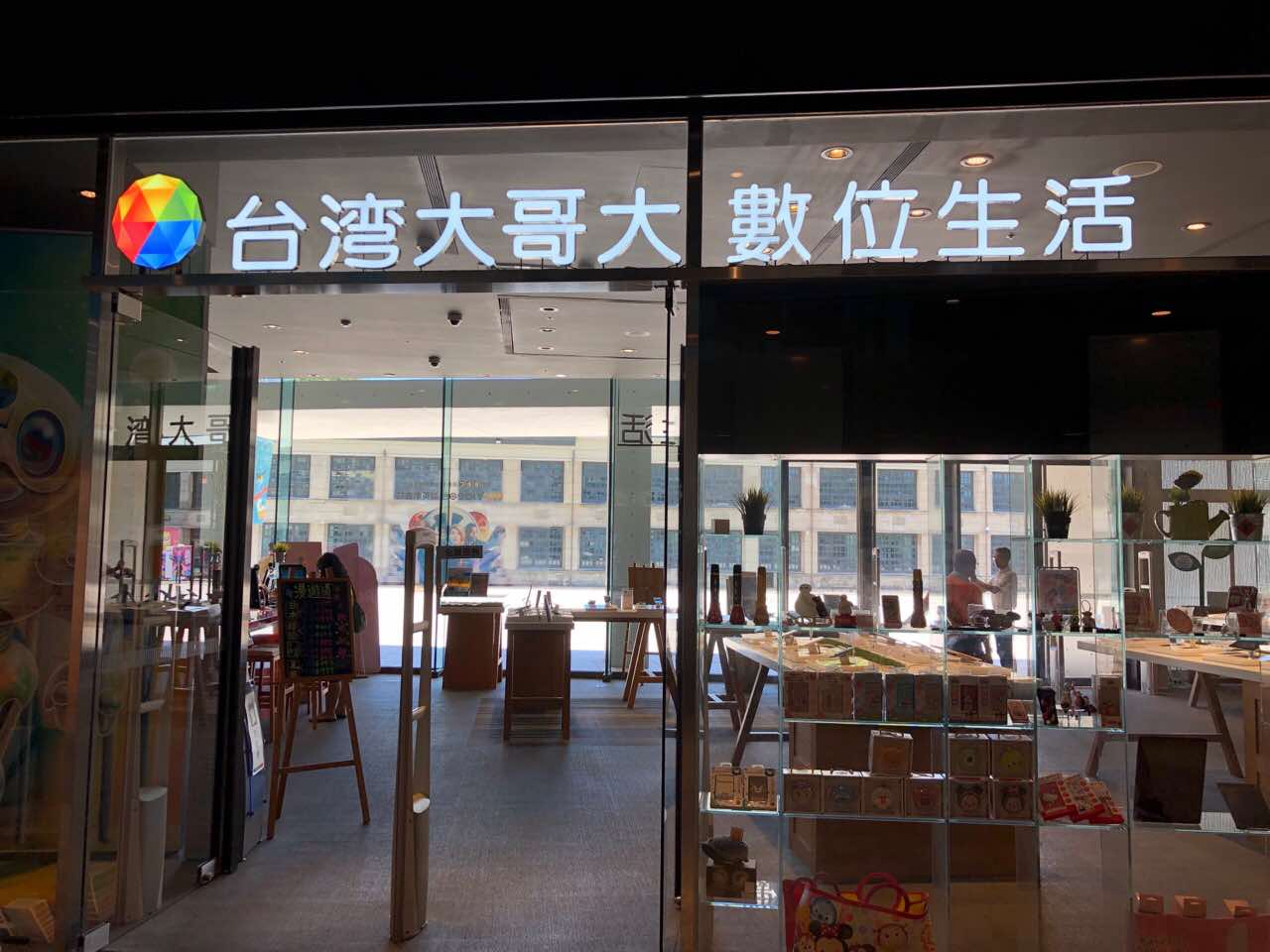
Taiwan Mobile's myfone Store

Taiwan Mobile (Chinese: 台灣大哥大; pinyin: Táiwān Dàgēdà) is a mobile phone operator based in Taiwan. It is the second largest telecom company behind Chunghwa Telecom.

== History ==
Taiwan Mobile started as part of a strategic divestment from the now defunct Pacific Electric Wire & Cable Co. Ltd (listed then in Taiwan's main board of securities). PEWC started their telecom venture first by becoming a shareholder (5%) of Iridium LLC in 1994, and this investment place them in a high profile, and high risk, following a strategic win in Hong Kong PCS license in 1995 and later rolled out as P Plus Communications in Hong Kong. PEWC also made various business development efforts and tender bids in different wireless licenses in China, Vietnam, Singapore, Indonesia and Philippines. The company finally returned to Taiwan to bid for the various licenses being liberalised in 1996 and 1997. Taiwan Mobile now also have acquired stakes in Taiwan Fixed Network.

Taiwan Mobile was previously named Pacific Cellular Corporation (太平洋電信事業股份有限公司; PCC) while the Hong Kong investment holding company was called PEWC Telecommunications Co. Ltd which holds the investment in P-Plus Communications Ltd. PEWC, PCC, Pacific Iridium were part of the overall telecom portfolio. The company had also invested into various telecom and internet businesses and had made a series of merger and acquisitions with retail distribution company, a CRM company and an engineering company that receives outsourcing contract from the combined cellular and phone companies. The company has merged in December 2023 with Taiwan Star Telecom to expand their 5G cellular network and even evolving on green energy consumption within the communications.

Today's Taiwan Mobile's logo is more colorful but still has the look of the original satellite gateway station of Iridium with hexagonal shapes. The older logo used to be all red and had a legacy red from the now defunct Pacific Electric Wire & Cable Co., Ltd (太平洋電線電纜股份有限公司; PEWC).

== Mobile Network Information ==
Frequency	Technology Type	Band	Bandwidth	Attributes
2100 MHz	UMTS; LTE-A	1		UMTS/WCDMA service will be terminated on this frequency on 31 Dec 2018. After that date, this frequency will be refarmed to LTE.
700 MHz	LTE-A	28	2x20 MHz	This frequency is to provide supplemental coverage in areas where the 1800 MHz frequency is weak or non-existent.
1800 MHz	LTE-A	3	2x15 MHz	Main LTE band for most services.
3.5 GHz	5G NR	n78	60 MHz	
28 GHz	5G NR	n257	200 MHz	

== See also ==
- List of companies of Taiwan
- Chunghwa Telecom
- Far EasTone
- Taiwan Star Telecom
