= Far EasTone =

Taiwanese telecommunications company

Far EasTone Telecommunications Co., Ltd.
- Company type: Public company
- Traded as: TWSE: 4904
- Industry: Telecommunications
- Founded: April 11, 1997; 29 years ago
- Headquarters: Taipei, Taiwan
- Key people: Douglas Hsu (chairman); Chee Ching (president)
- Services: Mobile phone
- Parent: Far Eastern Group

Chinese name
- Traditional Chinese: 遠傳電信股份有限公司
- Simplified Chinese: 远传电信股份有限公司
- Hanyu Pinyin: Yuǎnchuán Diànxìn Gǔfèn Yǒuxiàngōngsī
- Website: fetnet.net

Far EasTone Telecommunications Co., Ltd., marketed as FET (Chinese: 遠傳; pinyin: Yuǎnchuán), is a telecommunications company based in Taiwan. It is the third largest behind Chunghwa Telecom and Taiwan Mobile.

== History ==
Far EasTone was founded in October 1996 by the Far Eastern Group in a joint venture with AT&T. The company was awarded two wireless (GSM 900 and GSM 1800) service licenses in January 1997. The following year, Far EasTone launched its service and became the first company to introduce a fully integrated dual-band system.

Far EasTone was the first Taiwanese company to offer the Java 32K SIM Toolkit, mobile banking, mobile commerce, real-time access to financial, entertainment and headline news, mobile fax/mail, logo download and e-coupons. In March 1999, after fourteen months in business, Far EasTone achieved one million revenue-producing customers, faster than any other GSM operator.

The company was listed on the Taiwan OTC Stock Exchange in December 2001 under the ticker code 4904 and was officially listed on the Taiwan Stock Exchange in the electronic sector in August 2005. In September 2006, Far EasTone began providing 3G WCDMA services.

On December 16, 2009, Far EasTone acquired WiMAX licenses, and from December 22 began offering WiMAX transmission services. On October 30, 2013, Taiwan's LTE standard license bidding closed with Far EasTone paying NT$31.315 billion for the LTE frequency bands (700 MHz A2/1800 MHz C3, C4), with a total bandwidth of 30 MHz. Far EasTone launched 4G LTE services on June 3, 2014 and 5G NR services in 2020.

=== List of presidents ===
- Joseph O'Konek (May 1998 – 30 June 2002)
- Jan Nilsson (1 September 2002 – September 2010)
- Yvonne Li (10 September 2010 – January 2019)
- Chee Ching (since 7 January 2019)

== Mobile network frequencies ==
Frequency	Technology Type	Band	Bandwidth	Attributes
2100 MHz	LTE-A, WCDMA	1		UMTS/WCDMA service was terminated on 31 Dec 2018. This frequency was refarmed to LTE to increase capacity during times of congestion.
700 MHz	LTE-A	28	2x10 MHz	This frequency is to provide supplemental coverage in areas where the 1800 MHz or 2600 MHz frequencies are weak or non-existent. (Acquired from digital TV spectrum auction after analogue TV was switched off).
1800 MHz	LTE-A	3	2x20 MHz	Main LTE band for most services.
2600 MHz	LTE-A	7	2x20 MHz	This frequency acts as a capacity booster to supplement the 1800 MHz frequency in certain areas.
2600 MHz	LTE-A	38	25 MHz	Same frequency as band 7, but using TD-LTE modulation to increase download capacity in high traffic areas.
3.5 GHz	NR	n78	80 MHz	Deploying/in progress
28 GHz	NR	n257	400 MHz	Recent won in a spectrum auction in early 2020. In trial.

== Mergers and acquisitions ==
The parent company of KG Telecom, NTT Docomo, reportedly proposed in 2003 that KG Telecom and Far EasTone swap shares in a merger. A deal was reached in that July, only to fall through in August. Another round of negotiations produced a second agreement in October 2003. In April 2004, the merger was finalized, and became the largest ever acquisition in the Taiwanese telecom industry. In February 2005, Far EasTone bought a 55.3% stake in Arcoa. In May 2005, Far EasTone formally merged with Yuan-Ze Telecom. In May 2007, the company bought a 51% equity interest in Q-ware Communications to extend the scope of its wireless communications services.

In August 2007, Singtel transferred its 24.5% stake in New Century Infocomm Tech company for a 3.5% share of Far EasTone. On April 30, 2009, it was announced that China Mobile would invest up to 12 per cent into the company. The amount of foreign ownership was projected to be: NTT DoCoMo at 4.1 per cent, SingTel at 3.5 per cent, China Mobile at 12 per cent. On April 27, 2012, Singtel sold its 3.98% share of Far EasTone. On April 18, 2013, China Mobile announced the termination of a stake in Far EasTone, though the parties signed a bilateral cooperation agreement.

According to a July 5, 2015 article in The Wall Street Journal, there was a consortium seeking to buy cable television company China Network Systems from the private equity firm MBK Partners LP, led by the company and Morgan Stanley.

FarEasTone announced in February 2022 that the company would acquire Asia Pacific Telecom in a stock swap, resulting on the merger between two telecom.

== Subscribers and market share ==
The total number of subscribers between the Company and KGT was 6.13 million at the end of December 2008. In the Taiwan mobile market (2 & 3G) the market shares were as follows: Chunghwa Telecom at 35%, Taiwan Mobile at 25%, Far EasTone at 24%, Asia Pacific Telecom and Vibo Telecom at 10%, and PHS at 6%. The company, along with other leading Taiwan companies, has recently (April 29, 2016) been raising prices.

== See also ==
- List of companies of Taiwan
