= Shuttle Inc. =

Taiwanese computer hardware company

Shuttle Inc. 輔信科技股份有限公司
- Type: Public
- Traded as: TWSE: 2405
- Industry: Computer hardware Electronics
- Founded: 1983; 43 years ago
- Headquarters: Taiwan
- Number of employees: 450
- Website: www.shuttle.com

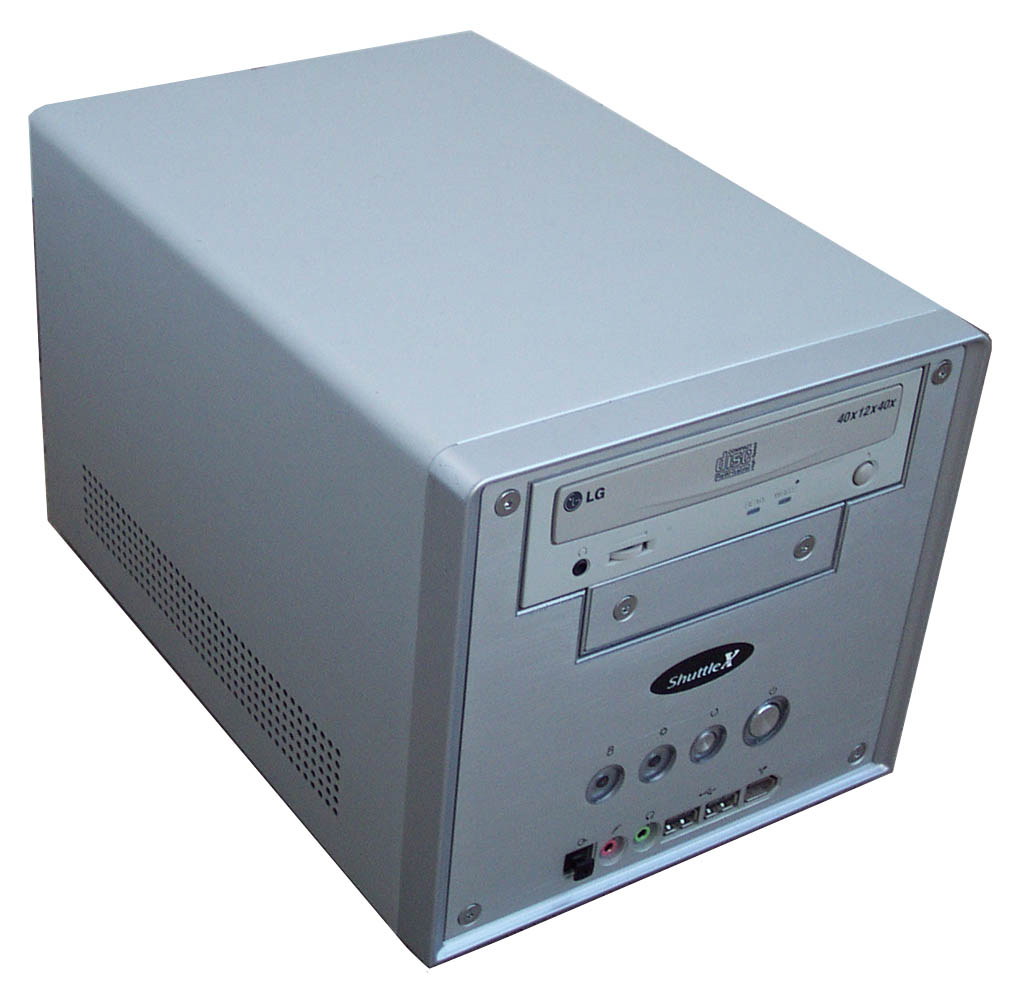
Shuttle PC

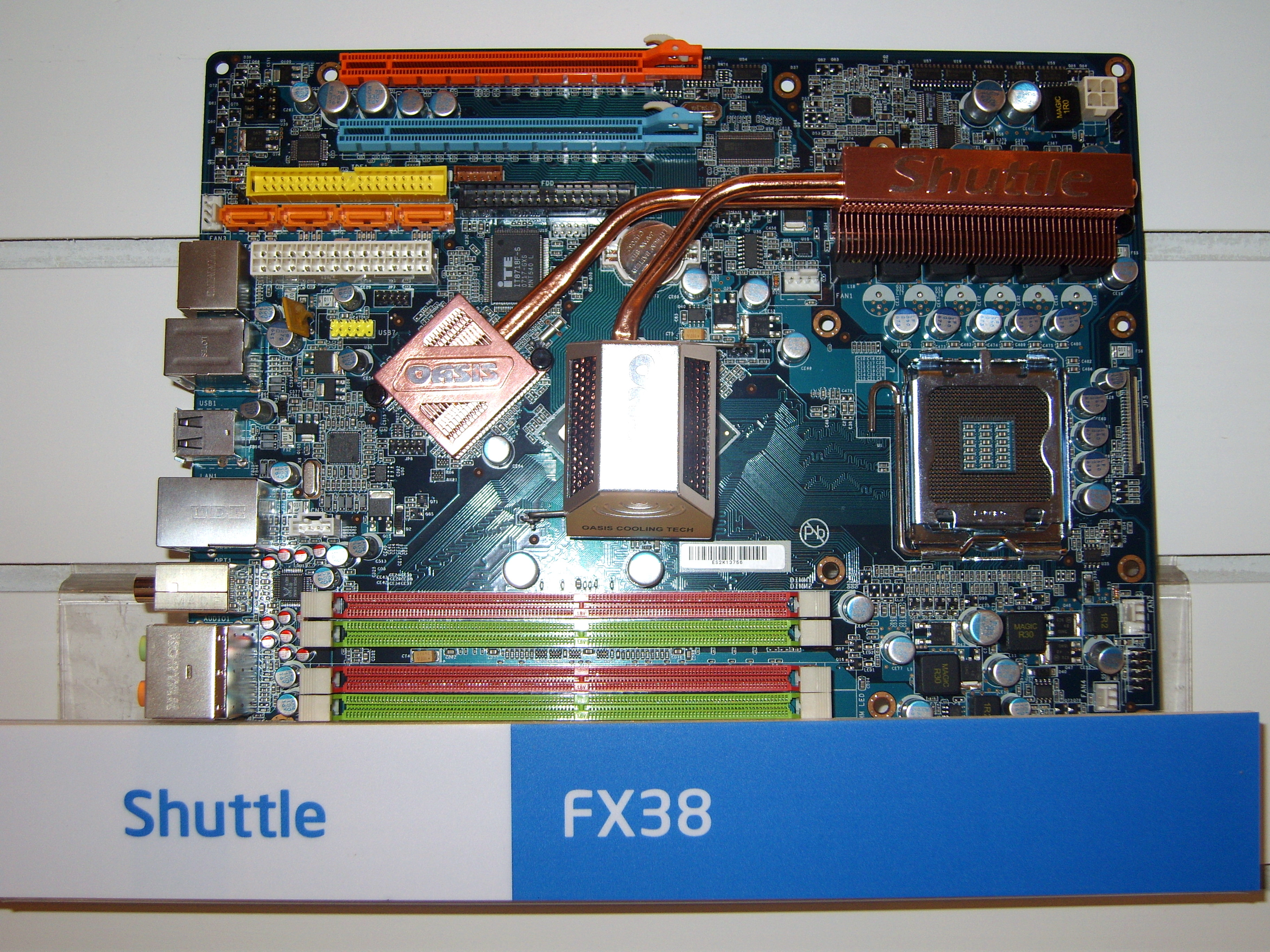
Shuttle PC Motherboard (BTX form factor)

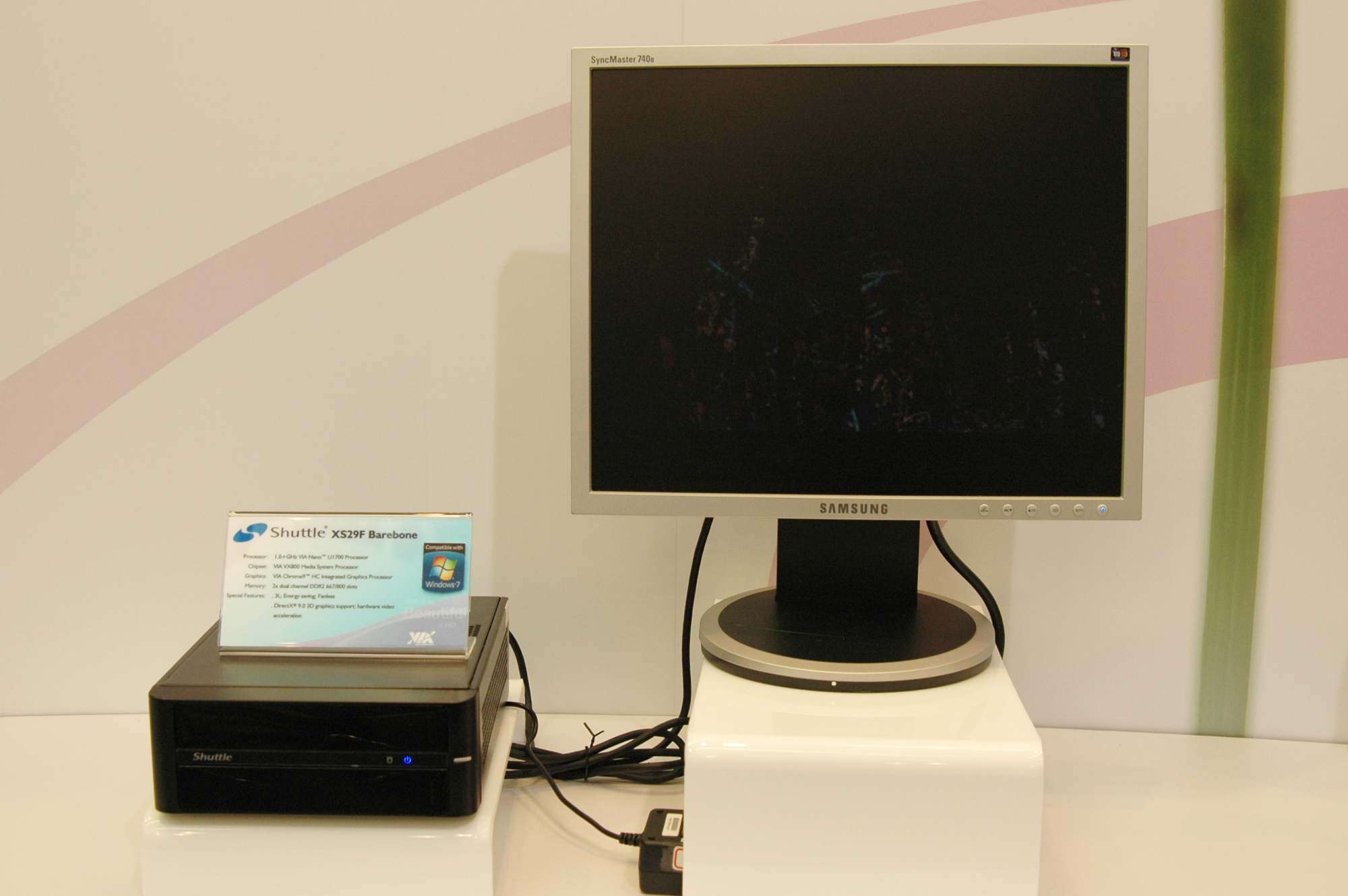
Shuttle XS29F Barebone using VIA Nano processor

Shuttle Inc. (Chinese: 輔信科技股份有限公司; simplified Chinese: 辅信科技; traditional Chinese: 輔信科技; pinyin: Fǔ Xìn Kē Jì) (TAIEX:2405) is a Taiwan-based manufacturer of motherboards, barebone computers, complete PC systems and monitors. In 2001, they introduced the Shuttle SV24, a small form factor computer.

Shuttle XPC desktop systems are based on same PC platform as the XPC barebone (case+motherboard+power supply) Shuttle manufactures.

== History ==
David and Simon Yu incorporated Shuttle in 1983 in Taiwan under the name Holco (浩鑫).

== Products ==
From 1987 to 2004, Shuttle manufactured AT, Baby AT, ATX, and Micro ATX motherboards. Among Shuttle's most popular motherboards were the HOT-603 Socket 7 motherboard based on the AMD640 chipset, and the AK31 Socket A motherboard based on the VIA KT266 and KT266A chipsets.

Shuttle's primary product is the XPC. The Shuttle XPC's design goal is to provide the power and features of a typical desktop PC in a fraction of the space. The XPC consists of a custom small-footprint motherboard, a rectangular chassis typically consisting of aluminum, a "Shuttle ICE" heatpipe-augmented heatsink, and a compact power supply. In 2004, Shuttle began manufacturing fully assembled PC systems.

The Shuttle XP17 is a portable 17" LCD introduced in 2004. The XP17 is targeted at LAN gaming and other activities requiring a portable, high performance monitor. The XP17 won the Red Dot Award for industrial design in June 2005.

== Laptop standardization proposal ==
At the 2010 Consumer Electronics Show Shuttle unveiled a proposal called Shuttle PCB Assembly (SPA) to standardize motherboard size and layouts for laptop computers. Computer Shopper magazine said this was one of the top ten announcements for innovation made at 2010 CES.

== Awards ==
In 2009, CNet praised one of Shuttle's new machines for allowing full sized graphics cards while still maintaining a small form factor.

== See also ==
- List of companies of Taiwan
