= Senao =

Senao can refer to:

- Senao International, Co., Ltd., founded 1979, Taiwanese distributor of cellular phones and related electronics and accessories
- Senao Networks, Inc., spun off from a Senao International, Co., Ltd. in 2006, a manufacturer of data networking products and wireless telephones under the EnGenius and Senao brand names
