= Biostar =

Taiwanese hardware manufacturing company

Biostar Microtech International Corp.
- Native name: 映泰股份有限公司
- Company type: Public
- Traded as: TWSE: 2399
- Industry: Computer hardware Electronics
- Founded: 1986; 40 years ago
- Headquarters: New Taipei, Taiwan
- Area served: Worldwide
- Key people: Mingyi Wang (CEO and Chairman) Mingzheng Wang (General Manager / Director)
- Products: Barebone computers Desktops; Expansion cards Graphics cards Headphones; Home theater PCs; Industrial PCs; Motherboards; Remote controls Server hardware Small form factor System-on-chip solutions Thermal grease
- Revenue: ▲NT$4.608 Billion / $147 Million (2013)
- Operating income: ▲NT$54.6 Million / $1.7 Million (2013)
- Net income: ▲NT$122.6 Million / $3.9 Million (2013)
- Number of employees: 553 (2014)
- Website: www.biostar.com.tw

Biostar Microtech International Corp. (Chinese: 映泰股份有限公司; pinyin: Yìngtài Gǔfèn Yǒuxiàn Gōngsī) is a Taiwanese company which designs and manufactures computer hardware products including motherboards, video cards, expansion cards, thermal grease, headphones, home theater PCs, remote controls, desktops, barebone computers, system-on-chip solutions and industrial PCs.

Awarded Taiwan's Top 20 Global Brand in 2008, Biostar, with an estimated brand value of US$46 million, was ranked No. 1 as the top motherboard brand for internet cafés in China. Biostar is an independent company listed on the main floor of Taiwan Stock Market, stock ID number TWSE: 2399.

== History ==
The company was founded in 1986, manufacturing XT form factor mainboards and in later years add-on cards. In 1999 Biostar was listed on the Taiwan Stock Exchange and met the ISO 9001 standard.

On 1 August 2004, having collaborated on Nvidia nForce based motherboards, Biostar became a partner with Nvidia of graphics solutions. Biostar was awarded "Top 20 Taiwan Global Brand" in 2008 conducted by Taiwan External Trade Development Council (TAITRA) with an estimate brand value of US$46 million.

Biostar allows end-users to modify voltages and frequencies of the video card's GPU and memory to boost performance to extreme limits (overclocking). Those cards are called "V-Ranger" or "V-Series".

Their mainboards, notably the "T-Power" and "T-Series", have been widely reviewed to be highly overclockable achieving world record FSB overclocks.

== Products ==
=== ethOS ===
A 64-bit Linux distribution operating system for cryptocurrency mining motherboard rig, it mines Monero, Ethereum, etc., developed in 2016.

=== Mainboard chipset ===
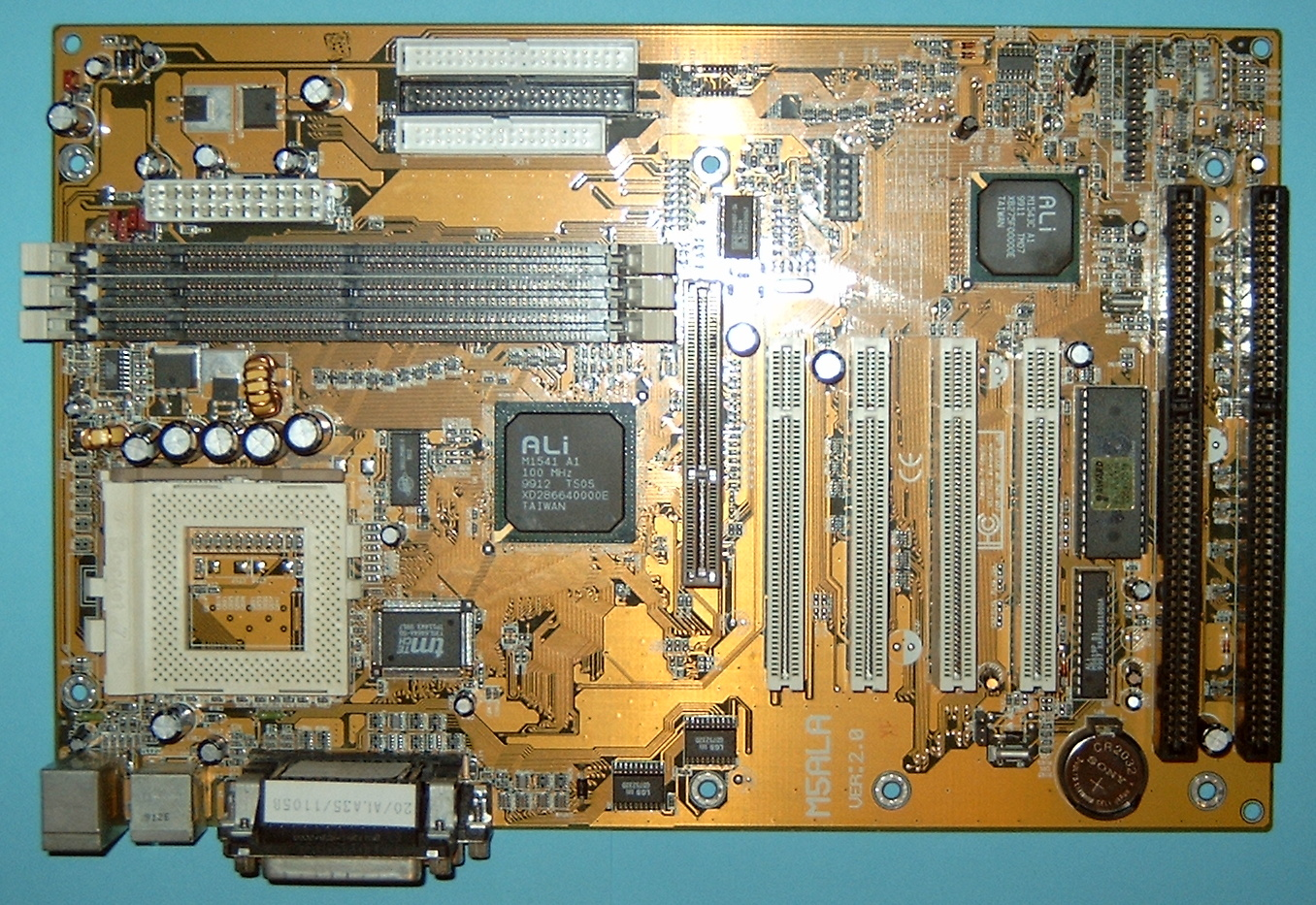
Biostar M5ALA Rev.2.0 ALi Aladdin V Chipset

== Location ==
Biostar is located in New Taipei City, Taiwan and has five regional headquarters around the world.

== See also ==
- List of companies of Taiwan
- ASRock
- Asus
- DFI
- Elitegroup Computer Systems (ECS)
- EVGA Corporation
- Gigabyte Technology
- Micro-Star International (MSI)
