= Windows tax =

Windows tax may refer to:

- The window tax, an historic British tax on glass
- "Windows tax", a term for the cost of Microsoft Windows preinstalled on a computer; see Bundling of Microsoft Windows
