= Taiwan Star Telecom =

Former mobile network operator in Taiwan

Taiwan Star Telecom Corporation Limited 台灣之星電信股份有限公司
- Formerly: Vibo Telecom
- Type: Unlisted company
- Founded: 2000
- Defunct: December 1, 2023
- Fate: Merged into Taiwan Mobile
- Successor: Taiwan Mobile
- Headquarters: Taipei
- Area served: Taiwan
- Key people: Feng-Hsiung Chang, CEO
- Products: Mobile and Telecommunication operator
- Website: https://www.tstartel.com

Taiwan Star Telecom Corporation Limited (Chinese: 台灣之星電信股份有限公司), doing business as T Star, and formerly Vibo Telecom Inc. (Chinese: 威寶電信股份有限公司; pinyin: Wēibǎo Diànxìn Gǔfèn Yǒuxiàn Gōngsī), was a 3G mobile network operator in Taiwan. Major operations were all done in Taiwan.

== Services ==
Vibo was founded in 2000. It was awarded a license in February 2002 and went live on October 1, 2005. Vibo offered a common pricing plan for broadband and mobile that was introduced under the slogan On-Net/Off-net one price.

T-Star's network is UMTS (W-CDMA) based in the 2.1 GHz band. Vibo also provided international roaming.

T-Star also uses Band 7 (2600MHZ) and Band 8 (900 MHz) for its LTE network.

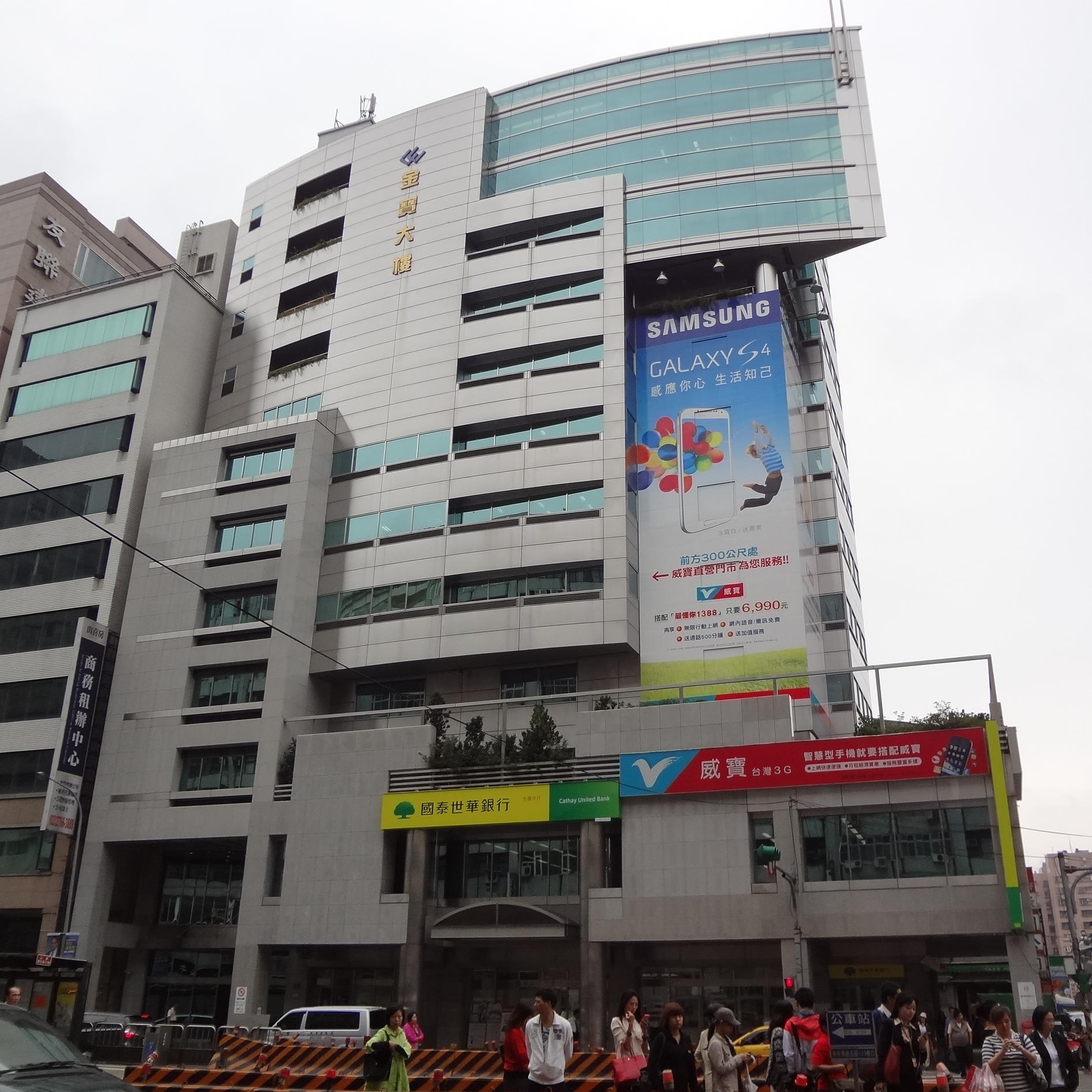
Kinpo Building, the former headquarters of Vibo Telecom.

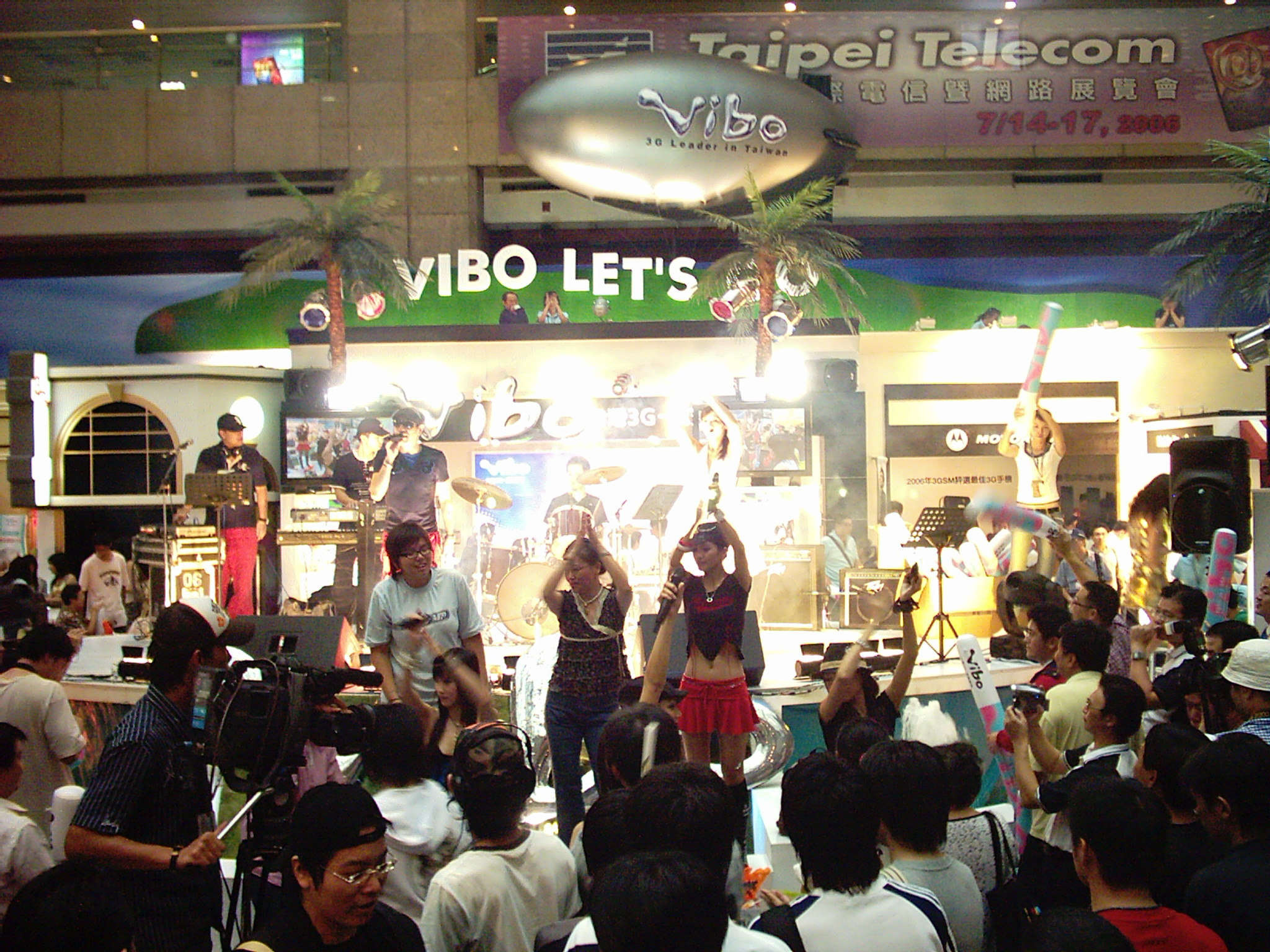
Vibo Telecom at Taipei Telecom (2006)

=== Mobile Network Information ===
Network Type	Frequencies (Band No).	Bandwidth	Attributes
WCDMA, LTE-A	2100 MHz (1)		UMTS/WCDMA service was terminated on 12/31/18. This frequency was reframed to LTE.
LTE-A	900 MHz (8)		This frequency band is used to extend coverage in areas where higher frequency bands are weak or non-existent. (In more populated areas, this frequency is combined with the 2600 MHz band to provide carrier aggregation to boost capacity.
LTE-A	2600 MHz (7)		2x20 MHz
NR	3.5 GHz (n78)		40 MHz

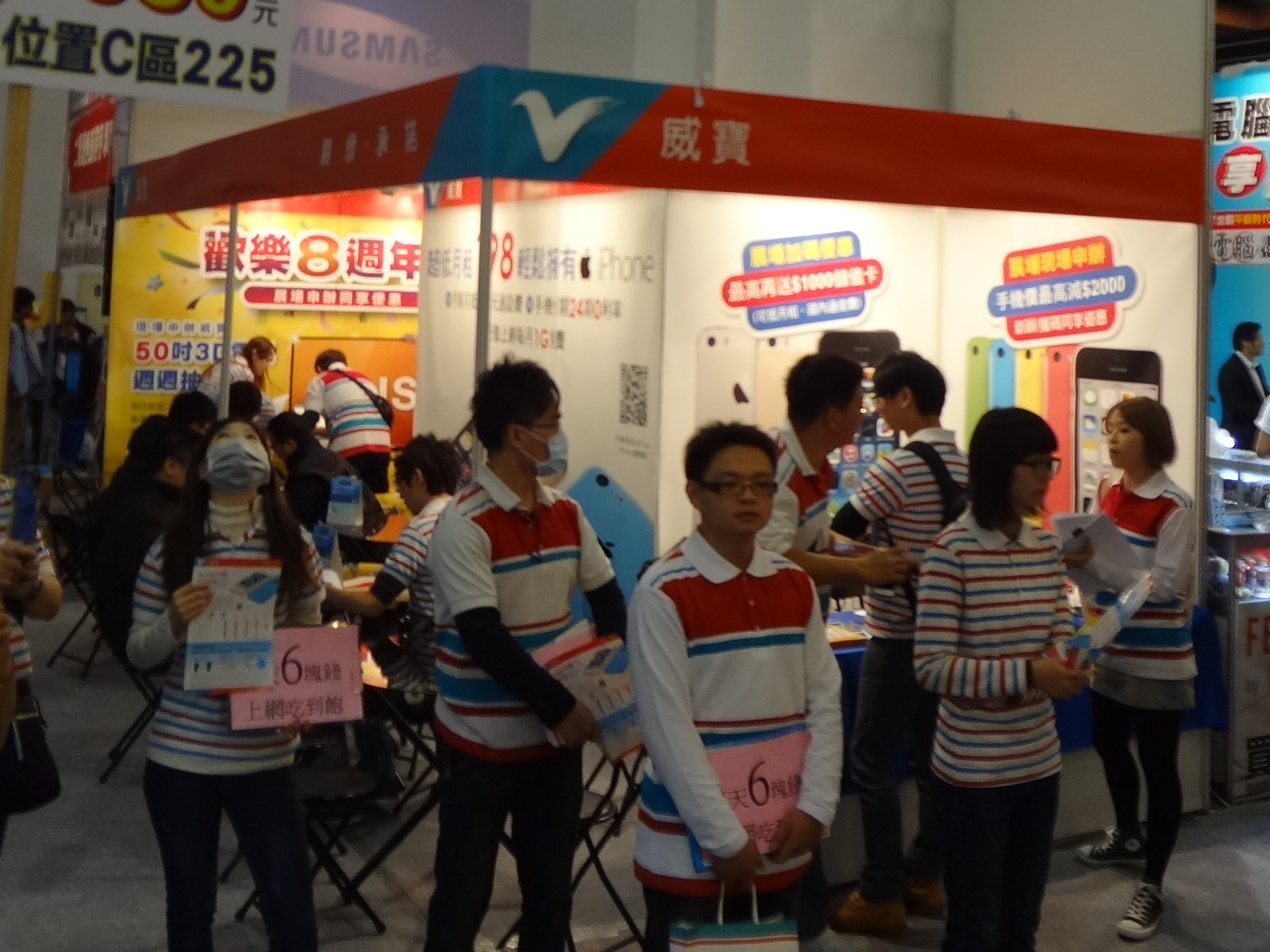
Vibo Telecom at IT Month (2013)

== History ==
In July 1999, the Preparatory Office of the Federal Telecommunications Co., Ltd. was established.

In April 2000, the Federal Telecommunications was established with the entire capital of NT 300 million yuan. In May 2000, the Securities and Futures Commission approved the Federal Telecommunications' public stock offering. On May 30, 2000, the federal telecommunications stock was listed on the Taiwan Stock Exchange under ticker 3157.

In February 2002, the Federal Telecommunications third-generation mobile communications service bid. In October, the federal telecommunications board elected Hsiung Hsu Ren Jinbao Electronics representative as chairman. In September 2003, the Federal Telecommunications was renamed to "Vibo Telecom Co, Ltd."

In September 2005, Vibo Telecom handled a syndicated loan of NT 9.06 billion yuan, International Commercial Bank of China, Chinatrust Commercial Bank, JihSun International Commercial Bank, Ta Chong Commercial Bank, China Development Industrial Bank, Taiwan Cooperative Bank, jointly organized a 23-bank syndicated loan. In December, the formal launch of the third-generation mobile communications business services took place.

In April 2006, over 10 million subscribers. Strategic alliance with Aurora Telecom operates a virtual mobile phone service (Mobile Virtual Network Operator, MVNO) business. In December, Vibo "Granville Card" was listed.

In February 2007, the exclusive launch of Taiwan's first mobile phone money card, "Granville travel card." In March, launched the "VIBO cards." May, a joint venture with Tecom VMAX. In June, Taiwan's first 3G prepaid "VIBO one card" (威寶旺卡) was listed. In September, "Wei Wei Bao Tong Card" launched new applications, the "Gateway Card Antenna Group and its subsidiaries," the world's most important industry-leading dual-card combination, non-contact inductive (NFC) technology, in cooperation with Union Bank, and including commercially available 3G handsets. In December, there were more than 4,000 completed WCDMA base station optimizations.

In July 2008, they invested in the "威寶電通" pathway, responsible for operating the phone. In April 2009, it broke the one million subscribers milestone. In September, an exclusive "MyCard video card" was launched. In November, completed Taiwan's first test network integration of WCDMA / TD-SCDMA system resources. In December, they broke the 1.5 million subscribers milestone.

In March 2010, Verbatim promoted quality improvement, the goal of two million subscribers, and revenue exceeded NT$12 billion. In April, Verbatim organized the "Action Taipei Technology Corridor" result presentation, Taiwan's first dual-brand system to complete the first 3.5G network of experimental stations and WiMAX certification. In December, Vibo Telecom launched its own brand tablet, "Vibo Vpad."

In June 2011, VIBO's net loss significantly improved operational robustness towards turnaround; Shareholders' Meeting re-election of directors and supervisors, general manager George Chou elected director. Vibo Telecom updated its corporate identity, English trademark "VIBO" with the first letter "V" as the representative of the company to identify the word; George Chou said, V symbolizes victory, and the V shape is male wings soaring upward like an eagle, a symbol of how Verbatim will soar, a new start. In July, Verbatim sold to Taiwan the first exclusive Dual SIM Android smartphone. In August, China Trust Commercial Bank Group signed a five-year NT$5 billion syndicated loan. In November, Vibo Telecom reduced capital by NT12.804 billion yuan.

In June 2012, Taiwan's first telecom operator, Vibo Telecom, and international communications software industry LINE started to work together. More than half of the entire network base station is HSPA+ (21 Mbps) 3.75G service building (six metropolitan areas to provide comprehensive HSDPA high-speed Internet service). The same month, according to the Consumers' Foundation, NTU motor pen collected 100,000 mobile internet connection speed data (August 15, 2011, to May 28, 2012). Survey results show that mobile data service quality and Verbatim three domestic telecom industry to keep pace, network quality in some places is better than in others.

In June 2013, Verbatim stores started grid again, closer to consumer demand. The same month, they won the Business Times "2013 Taiwan's service industry big evaluation" chain telecommunications access class silver medal.

On November 8, 2013, Campbell and Compal Electronics announced the sale to Taiwan Vibo Star mobile telecommunications, with the end of April 2014 to be converted to equity conversion. Star holds an 8% stake in Taiwan; after the share swap, Campbell Compal Electronics and Taiwan each hold about a 4% stake, and no longer hold Vibo Telecom's stake. On January 23, 2014, Vibo Telecom held a board meeting, approving the resignation of General Manager George Chou and Vice Chairman William Yen.

On April 25, 2014, Vibo Telecom in Taiwan held the Stars' shareholders meeting, and after the two sides discussed through a shared swap, Vibo Telecom decided to convert into shares of Taiwan, completing the Star's 100% shareholding of subsidiaries.

On June 3, 2014, the Board of Directors Chairman VIBO reelection, retiring Vibo Telecom Hsiung Hsu, chairman of Taiwan's Star Director Wei Ying took Vibo Telecom Chairman; Vibo Telecom Board also resolved to change the headquarters business address, business address from the headquarters, Lane 358, 5th Floor, No. 36 Ruiguang to Taipei Neihu Road, Taipei, Tiding Avenue, 6th Floor, No. 239, Sec. On June 4, 2014, Taiwan Star Telecom (台灣之星電信) announced an LTE concession license, and Vibo Telecom officially became Taiwan Star with 100% shareholding of subsidiaries.

On December 1, 2023, T Star was merged into Taiwan Mobile.

== See also ==
- List of companies of Taiwan
- Chunghwa Telecom
- Taiwan Mobile
- Far EasTone
