= Senao Networks =

Senao Networks, Inc. is a Taiwanese manufacturer of data networking and telephony products marketed under the EnGenius and Senao brands. The company was spun off in 2006 from Senao International, Co., Ltd., a distributor of cell phones and related electronics and accessories and a subsidiary of Chunghwa Telecom, the incumbent PSTN, mobile, and broadband carrier of Taiwan. All three are public companies listed on the Taiwan Stock Exchange.

The networking products line includes switches, indoor and outdoor long range wifi access points.

The telephony line includes the DuraFon line of long ranges cordless phones (PSTN and VoIP versions.)

As of mid-2024, Senao International held about 34% of the stake, making it the company's largest stakeholder, followed by the second-largest stakeholder's 3.5%.

In 2023, the CEO Tsai said he is considering investing in southern Taiwan.
