= Windows Refund Day =

1999 protest

Windows Refund Day was a protest that lasted a day, on February 15, 1999, due to Linux users being unable to get refunds for the bundled copy of Microsoft Windows included with their computers. Multiple protests took place outside of Microsoft offices in the US, with the most well-documented one occurring in the San Francisco Bay Area in California.

== Motives for the protests ==
At the time, original equipment manufacturers (OEMs) used to sell computers that were bundled with a Windows license, including laptops. Computer users who used Linux or other open source operating systems who did not use Windows wanted to be refunded, as the bundled copy significantly raised the price of the computer.

When the press interviewed them, they claimed that although the end user license agreement (EULA) mentioned that "users who do not accept this EULA can return this copy of Windows to the OEM to get a refund", the OEMs would tell Linux users that Microsoft was responsible for the refunds, "as the OEM isn't the manufacturer of Windows", essentially creating a loophole. In 1997, an article was published where a Linux user described how she successfully managed to receive a refund for a laptop she had bought that had Windows bundled with it. According to her, it was a "lengthy process" and a manager at the company that manufactured the laptop, Canon Inc., claimed that they had not been told by Microsoft that the OEM is the one that is supposed to issue the refund.

== Bay Area protest ==
News coverage of the Bay Area protest
- ABC7 News
- News Station 4
- Compilation including ABC7, Channel 5 Eyewitness News, News Station 4 and Fox 2 News

On February 15, 1999, protesters arrived outside of Microsoft's Foster City office (950 Tower Ln, Suite 9000, Foster City, California; 37°33′29.71″N 122°16′34.79″W) after making signs at a local Denny's parking lot. This quickly caught the attention of members of the press and news stations. The protesters were users of Linux and other open source operating systems who did not use Windows and had no use for the bundled license that their computer included. They were holding signs, as well as bundled copies of Windows that were included with their computers. Microsoft had been expecting the protesters and had even put up a sign welcoming them. A Microsoft representative was also there, mainly to talk to the press members.

When the press interviewed a Microsoft spokesperson, he claimed that the protest was a "PR activity being used by some Linux enthusiasts to generate interest in their products". Microsoft reminded users that the OEMs were the ones who were supposed to issue the refunds for the copies of Windows and issued an official letter to the protesters which also mentioned that OEMs who sold computers with no operating system or Linux preinstalled existed.

A few protesters even attempted to enter the Microsoft office, on the 9th floor of the building. However, the elevator had been configured to disable access to the 9th floor, and when protesters tried to use the elevator to go to the 10th floor and use the stairs to go to the 9th floor, they discovered that the doors were locked from the side of the stairway.

After many attempts to get into the offices, the protesters left the building without any refunds.

== Aftermath ==
Although the protesters could not get refunds for the Windows copies bundled with their PCs, as one protester claimed: "the goal of the protest was to raise awareness to the catch 22 issue".

The protests received media attention from local news channels that covered the story. News outlets including BBC News and The New York Times also published articles on the internet which reached people worldwide.
