= SmarTone =

Telecommunications company in Hong Kong

SmarTone Telecommunications Holdings Limited

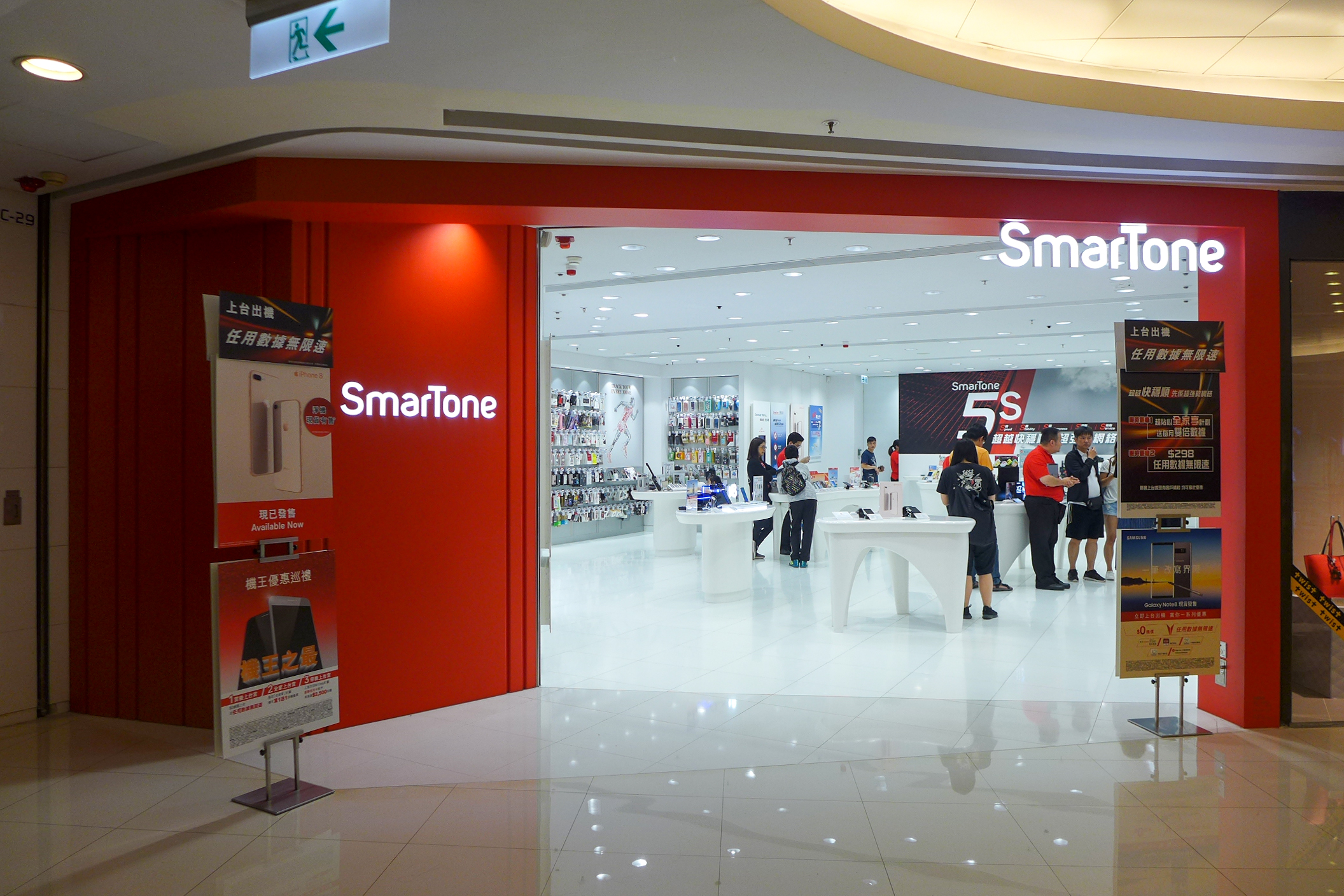
- The SmarTone store in APM.
- Type: Public
- Traded as: SEHK: 315
- Industry: Mobile telecommunication
- Founded: 1992; 34 years ago (in British Hong Kong)
- Headquarters: Hong Kong
- Area served: Hong Kong
- Key people: Raymond Kwok (Chairman); Allen Fung (Deputy Chairman); Fiona Lau (Chief Executive Officer); Stephen Chau (Chief Technology Officer)
- Services: Mobile; 5G Home Broadband; Fibre Broadband; Roaming; Value-added Services
- Number of employees: 1,737 (full-time only, 30 June 2022)
- Parent: Sun Hung Kai Properties
- Website: www.smartone.com

SmarTone Telecommunications Holdings Limited (0315.HK), listed in Hong Kong since 1996 and a subsidiary of Sun Hung Kai Properties Limited, is a leading telecommunications provider with operating subsidiaries in Hong Kong, offering voice, multimedia and mobile broadband services, as well as fixed fibre broadband services for both consumer and corporate markets. SmarTone spearheaded 5G development in Hong Kong since May 2020, with the launch of its territory-wide 5G services. SmarTone is also the first in Hong Kong to launch Home 5G Broadband service.

== History ==
SmarTone was launched by Sun Hung Kai Properties and ABC Communications in 1992. It started operations in March 1993 as the first GSM network in Hong Kong and in Asia. It used to have another branding EXTRA for its GSM-1800-only packages obtained by the acquisition of P Plus Communications in March 1998. The brand EXTRA ended in 2002 and was merged into SmarTone's dual-band network.

A new branding "SmarTone-Vodafone" was officially launched in April 2005, following a partnership agreement with Vodafone in December 2004. This brand name was used only in Hong Kong. SmarTone retained its original brand name in Macau.

On 19 September 2011, SmarTone Telecommunications Holdings Limited announced that it would not renew its marketing co-operation with Vodafone and reverted its brand to SmarTone from December 2011.

In January 2018, SmarTone launched a new brand, Birdie, which is targeting millennial. Birdie has two products: the no contract local mobile plan and the travel data SIM card (simply known as Birdie Travel SIM).

In March 2019, SmarTone pushed the frontier to 5G and pioneered Hong Kong’s first 5G live field trial in 3.5 GHz and 28 GHz bands simultaneous

On 26 May 2020, SmarTone launched its 5G service in Hong Kong, offering ultra fast 5G connectivity with the widest network coverage both indoors and outdoors.

In September 2020, SmarTone launched Hong Kong’s first Home 5G Broadband Service, offering 5G ultra-fast speed, simple plug-and-play setup and fibrefree convenience for residential users.

In May 2021, SmarTone unveiled ‘5G LAB’ at Sky100 Observation Deck of International Commerce Centre to showcase Hong Kong’s world-class 5G innovation and solidify its status as a global 5G leader.

In December 2022, SmarTone announced a collaboration with The Point, an integrated loyalty programme of Sun Hung Kai Properties. SmarTone’s customers can automatically earn 1 The Point bonus point upon every eligible spending of $2 at SmarTone.

== Network Development ==
=== Hong Kong ===
Frequencies used on SmarTone in Hong Kong
Frequency	Frequency Width	Protocol	Notes
700 MHz (713~718; 768~773)	2*5 MHz		
850 MHz (825~837.5; 870~882.5)	2*12.5 MHz	GSM/LTE	
900 MHz (910~915;955~960)	2*5 MHz	GSM/LTE	
1800 MHz (1710~1720;1805~1815)+(1740~1750;1835~1845)	2*20 MHz ( not contiguous)	GSM/LTE	
2100 MHz (1920.3 – 1925.3;2110.3 – 2115.3)+(1960.0 – 1964.9;2150.0 – 2154.9)	2*20 MHz ( not contiguous)	LTE	
2600 MHz (2520~2530;2640~2650)	2*10 MHz	LTE	
3.3 GHz (3360~3380)	20 MHz		
3.5 GHz (3510~3560)	50 MHz		
4.9 GHz (4920-4960)	40 MHz		

==== 2G ====
- March 1993 – Launched Asia's first GSM mobile service
- December 1993 – Launched Asia's first auto-GSM roaming service
- December 2002 – Launched SmarTone iN! – Proprietary advanced multimedia services mobile portal for customers
- August 2012 – Re-farmed the 2G 1800 MHz frequency band for its 4G LTE network and put into use
- September 2014 – Announced in the 2013/2014 Annual Results Announcement that it started to re-farm its 2G 900 MHz spectrum for 4G LTE, to provide even better coverage. The re-farming targets to complete at the end of 2014
- August 2022 - Announced to Terminate 2G Services on 14 October 2022

==== 3G ====
- December 2004 – Launched 3G services
- July 2007 – Became the first company in the world to enable customers to stream flash video when browsing on any 3G feature phone
- April 2010 – Debut 28.8 Mbit/s HSPA+ network
- September 2001 – Successfully bid the 3G license in Hong Kong
- March 2011 – Won the auction for 850 MHz frequency band for its 3G service

==== 4G ====
- August 2012 – Launched its 4G service with 1800 MHz spectrum, supporting all 4G smartphones available in Hong Kong. 1800 MHz spectrum provides better indoor coverage than higher frequency spectrum
- September 2012 – Became the only Hong Kong mobile operator approved by Apple to offer 4G on iPhone 5. SmarTone emphasized that "it is the only operator in HK offers 4G network on iPhone 5"
- November 2012 – Extended 4G LTE coverage on all MTR Island Line stations and targets to offer 4G LTE coverage at all MTR stations and its connecting tunnels in early 2013
- January 2013 – Provided 4G LTE network along the seven MTR lines (Island Line, Kwun Tong Line, Tsuen Wan Line, Tseng Kwan O Line, Tung Chung Line, Disney Line and the Airport Express). In the same year, it successfully bid for 2 x 10 MHz at the 2600 MHz frequency band for its 4G network to expand its network capacity and offer higher speed
- December 2013 – Extended its 4G coverage to KCR's lines (East Rail Line, West Rail Line and Ma On Shan Line) and Lok Ma Chau Line
- August 2014 – Launched VoLTE service but only supported selected smartphone models
- September 2014 – Commenced the re-farming of 2G 900MHZ spectrum for its 4G LTE, to provide better indoor coverage. Target to complete the re-farming end of this year. SmarTone planned to meet the growing data demand with cell densification, small cell technologies, LTE-Advanced, as well as refarming
- October 2016 – Extended 4G coverage to the new MTR Kwun Tong Line Extension, covering the new Whampoa and Ho Man Tin stations
- December 2016 - Extended 4.5G coverage to the new South Island Line, including Ocean Park, Wong Chuk Hang, Lei Tung and South Horizons stations and deployed additional 2100 MHz spectrum to all MTR lines

==== 5G ====
- November 2016 – Partnered with Ericsson for a five-year partnership toward 5G, commencing early trials and pilot deployments of key pre-5G technologies to take place in Q4 2016
- May 2020 - Launched its 5G service
- Sept 2020 - Launched its Home 5G Broadband Service
- Oct 2021 - Acquired 65 MHz of New Radio Spectrum Expanding Network Capacity to Support Future 5G Business Growth
- May 2022 - 5G network coverage extends to East Rail Line cross-harbour extension Optimal network experience spanning all Hong Kong MTR stations
- Dec 2022 - 5G Network covers Tseung Kwan O – Lam Tin Tunnel and Cross Bay Link

=== Macau ===
The 2G, 3G and 4G networks of SmarTone Macau were built by Nokia Networks.

==== 2G ====
- July 2001 – Launched GSM mobile service in Macau
- Its market share was estimated at approximately 11% as of December 31, 2003.
- 2019 - 2G service terminated as Macau decommissioned 2G network.

==== 3G ====
- July 2010 – Launched 3G service in Macau

==== 4G ====
- November 2015 – Launched 4G service in Macau
- August 2024 - The Macau SAR Government has received an application from SmarTone to forgo the 4G license and plans to cease renewing the 3G license after expiration. According to the Post and Telecommunications Bureau (CTT), SmarTone (at that time) had a relatively small market share in Macau, only a single-digit percentage.
- SmarTone MAC is the only carrier not yet to offer VoLTE in Macau, till its operation ceased.

Frequencies used on SmarTone in Macau (Before operation ceased)
Frequency	Frequency Width	Protocol	Notes
1800 MHz (1750-1760; 1845-1855)	2*10 MHz	LTE	
2100 MHz (1930-1935; 2120-2125)	2*5 MHz	UMTS/HSPA/HSPA+	

== Home 5G Broadband Service ==
SmarTone was Hong Kong’s first telecom operator to launch Home 5G Broadband service in September 2020, offering 5G ultra-fast speed, simple plug-and-play setup and fibrefree convenience for residential users.

== Fibre Broadband Service ==
SmarTone launched its fibre broadband service for the home and office markets in 2014.

== See also ==
- List of companies of Hong Kong
