= Senao International =

- Type: Public
- Traded as: TWSE: 2450
- Industry: Technology
- Founded: 1979
- Key people: Yu Cheng-hsien (CEO)
- Parent: Chunghwa Telecom

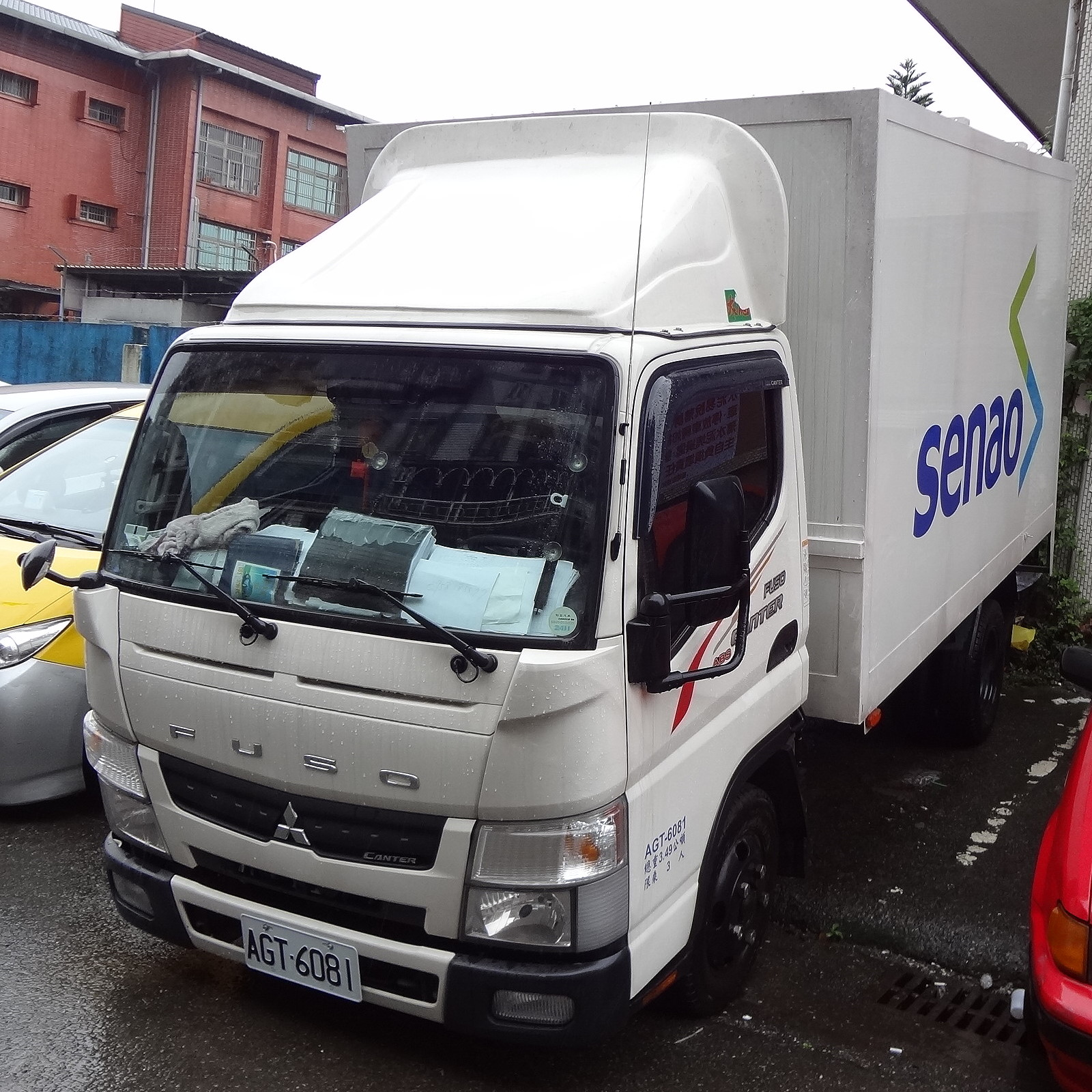
Senao International delivery truck in Keelung, Taiwan

Senao International, Co., Ltd. is a Taiwanese distributor of cellular phones, smartphones, tablets, notebooks, game consoles and related accessories. Founded in 1979, it is a public company listed on the Taiwan Stock Exchange and a subsidiary of Chunghwa Telecom, the incumbent mobile, PSTN, and broadband carrier of Taiwan. Senao International is the largest cellular phone distributor in Taiwan with over 50% market share.

In 2006, the wireless product group that manufactures data networking products and wireless telephones under the EnGenius and Senao brand names was spun off from Senao International to become Senao Networks, Inc.

The current CEO is Yu Cheng-hsien.

== See also ==
- List of companies of Taiwan
