= P Plus Communications =

P-Plus Communications Co. Limited was a PCS/GSM company based in Hong Kong originally formed by a consortium led by PEWC, Star Paging, Telecom Finland, Telecom Paging, Asia Paging, BB Telecom, Epro Telecom, and 2 other smaller paging companies in 1995. The consortium was successful in winning the first PCS/GSM 1800 license issued by Hong Kong's OFTA (one of six that was issued) in 1995. P-Plus Communications Limited won the first mobile license in Asia by Hong Kong–based paging companies who had the strategic plan to be part of the mobile value-chain. PEWC, a Taiwanese company, had later in 1996 also won the tender bidding contest in Taiwan for the PCS license in Taiwan and is currently the market leader in Mobile services and one who also own a fixed network license in Taiwan. P-Plus was acquired and integrated to become Smartone's Extra (1800Mhz) services in 1998.

Telecom Finland, who co-founded the GSM MoU (now GSM Association), was the technical partner and the seven paging companies each contributed their billing and customer care experience and access to RF planning and sites access. PEWC was the largest shareholder (and the only Taiwanese shareholder to have involved in bidding of a PCS license in HK), who also had a 5% stake in the world-renowned Iridium Satellite communication project and increasing foothold and exposure in their home country. Taiwan had chosen focus their resources and capabilities for Taiwan and hence chose to exit the Hong Kong markets, which inadvertently had led to the sale of P-Plus to SmarTone in 1998. P-Plus was the first carrier in Hong Kong to have proposed to OFTA and to have offered per-second billing plan which intended to offer to the mass-market an alternative pricing-plan solution for a market that is only adapted to per-minute billing increments. P-Plus was then using Nokia's mobile network infrastructure and had deployed Hong Kong wide services.
