= TAIEX =

Taiwanese stock market index

TAIEX (TWSE Capitalization Weighted Stock Index)
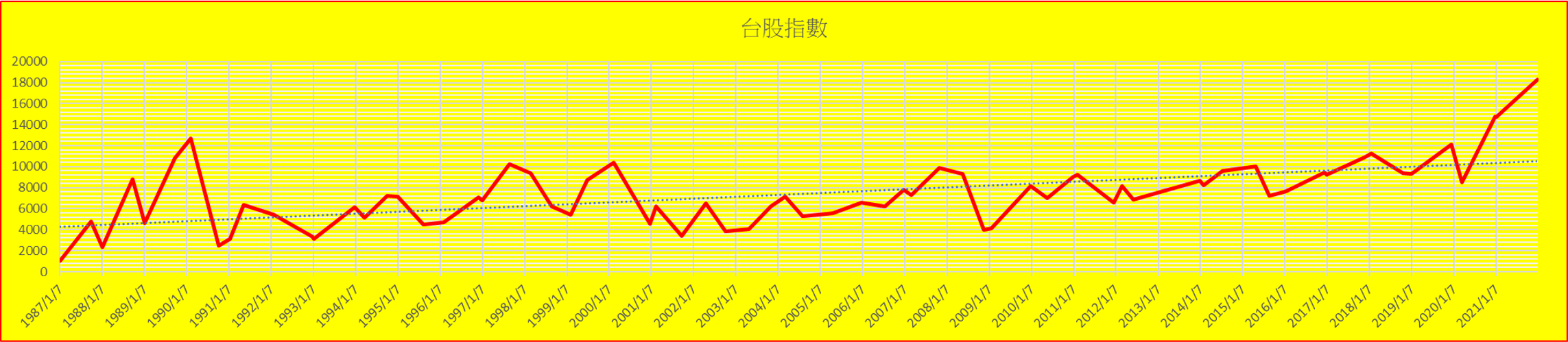
- Foundation: 5 January 1967; 59 years ago
- Operator: Taiwan Index Plus (TIP)
- Exchanges: Taiwan Stock Exchange (TWSE)
- Constituents: 1,049 (30 January 2026)
- Weighting method: Capitalization Weighted Index
- Related indices: TPEX (TPEx Exchange Capitalization Weighted Stock Index)
- Website: taiwanindex.com.tw/indexes/t00

TAIEX
- Traditional Chinese: 發行量加權股價指數
Transcriptions
Standard Mandarin
- Hanyu Pinyin: Fāxíngliàng Jiāquán Gǔjià Zhǐshù
- Wade–Giles: Fa¹-hsing²-liang⁴ Chia¹-ch′üan² Ku³-chia⁴ Chih³-shu⁴
Hakka
- Pha̍k-fa-sṳ: Fat-hàng-liong Kâ-khièn Kú-ka Chṳ́-su
Southern Min
- Hokkien POJ: Hoat-hêng-liōng Ka-koân Kó͘-kè Chí-sò͘
- Tâi-lô: Huat-hîng-liōng Ka-kuân Kóo-kè Tsí-sòo

Alternative Chinese name
- Traditional Chinese: 加權指數
Transcriptions
Standard Mandarin
- Hanyu Pinyin: Jiāquánzhǐshù
- Wade–Giles: Chia¹-ch′üan²-chih³-shu⁴
Hakka
- Pha̍k-fa-sṳ: Kâ-khièn Chṳ́-su
Southern Min
- Hokkien POJ: Ka-koân Chí-sò͘
- Tâi-lô: Ka-kuân Tsí-sòo

The Taiwan Stock Exchange Capitalization Weighted Stock Index (Chinese: 臺灣證券交易所發行量加權股價指數), TWSE Capitalization Weighted Stock Index, or TAIEX (Chinese: 加權指數) is a stock market index for companies traded on the Taiwan Stock Exchange (TWSE). The TAIEX covers all of the listed stocks excluding preferred stocks, full-delivery stocks and newly listed stocks, which are listed for less than one calendar month. It was first published in 1967 by TWSE with 1966 being the base year with a value of 100. As of February 2026, there were 1066 companies listed on TAIEX.

The Taiwanese stock market experienced a "bubble economy" from 1986 to 1990. When in 1986 the index was around 1000 points, it reached a peak of over 12,000 points in February 1990 then plummeted to around 2500 points by October 1990.

== Annual Returns ==
The following table shows the annual development of the TAIEX since 1966.

Year	Closing level	Change in index in points	Change in index in %
1966	100.00		
1967	105.76	5.76	5.76
1968	106.63	0.87	0.82
1969	110.30	3.67	3.44
1970	123.38	13.08	11.86
1971	135.13	11.75	9.52
1972	228.03	92.90	68.75
1973	495.45	267.42	117.27
1974	193.06	−302.39	−61.03
1975	330.08	137.02	70.97
1976	372.20	42.12	12.76
1977	450.44	78.24	21.02
1978	532.43	81.99	18.20
1979	549.55	17.12	3.22
1980	558.45	8.90	1.62
1981	551.03	−7.42	−1.33
1982	443.57	−107.46	−19.50
1983	761.92	318.35	71.77
1984	838.07	76.15	9.99
1985	835.12	2.88	0.34
1986	1,039.11	203.99	24.43
1987	2,339.86	1,300.75	125.18
1988	5,119.11	2,779.25	118.78
1989	9,624.18	4,505.07	88.00
1990	4,530.16	−5,094.02	−52.93
1991	4,540.55	10.39	0.23
1992	3,377.06	−1,163.49	−25.62
1993	6,070.56	2,693.50	79.76
1994	7,111.10	1,040.54	17.14
1995	5,158.65	−1,952.45	−27.46
1996	6,933.94	1,775.29	34.41
1997	8,187.27	1,253.33	18.08
1998	6,418.43	−1,768.84	−21.60
1999	8,448.84	2,030.41	31.63
2000	4,743.94	−3,704.90	−43.85
2001	5,551.24	807.30	17.02
2002	4,452.45	−1,098.79	−19.79
2003	5,890.69	1,438.24	32.30
2004	6,139.69	249.00	4.23
2005	6,548.34	408.65	6.66
2006	7,823.72	1,275.38	19.48
2007	8,506.28	682.56	8.72
2008	4,591.22	−3,915.06	−46.03
2009	8,188.11	3,596.89	78.34
2010	8,972.50	784.39	9.58
2011	7,072.08	−1,900.42	−21.18
2012	7,699.50	627.42	8.87
2013	8,611.51	912.01	11.85
2014	9,307.26	695.75	8.08
2015	8,338.06	−969.20	−10.41
2016	9,253.50	915.44	10.98
2017	10,642.86	1,389.36	15.01
2018	9,727.41	−915.45	−8.60
2019	11,997.14	2,269.73	23.33
2020	14,732.53	2,735.39	22.80
2021	18,218.84	3,486.31	23.66
2022	14,137.69	−4,081.15	−22.40
2023	17,930.81	3,793.12	26.83
2024	23,035.10	5,104.29	28.47
2025	28,963.60	5,928.50	25.74
