= Gigabyte GSmart G1305 Boston =

Smartphone from Gigabyte Technology

GSmart G1305
- Brand: Gigabyte Technology
- Series: GSmart
- Operating system: Android OS, v1.6 (Donut), v2.1 (Éclair)
- System-on-chip: Qualcomm MSM7227
- CPU: 600 MHz ARM11
- GPU: Adreno 200
- Memory: 256 MB RAM
- Storage: MicroSD, up to 16GB
- Other: CPU Instruction Set: ARMv6

The Gigabyte GSmart G1305 Boston is a smartphone from Gigabyte Technology corporation.
The phone includes the MSM7227 SoC from Qualcomm which is equipped with an ARM11 processor running at 600 MHz. This ARM11 processor has the following CPU Instruction Set: ARMv6.

Note: The MSM7227 previously belonged to Qualcomm MSM7000 Series but MSM7227 and MSM7627 were later included in the Snapdragon S1 family from Qualcomm, see Snapdragon S1 family from Qualcomm.

== Naming ==
The Gigabyte GSmart G1305 Boston is also recognized by other names like:

- Gigabyte GSmart G1305 Codfish
- Orange Boston

== Clones ==
It appears that other smartphones are pure and simple clones of the Gigabyte GSmart G1305 Boston. Here is a list of them:

- Optimus Boston

== See also ==
- Full Smartphone Specifications - gsmarena.com
- Official Website for Mobile Communications - gsmart.gigabytecm.com
- Qualcomm MSM7x27 SoCs belonging to MSM7000 SoC Family
- Gigabyte GSmart Roma RX
