= Bundling of Microsoft Windows =

Installation of Microsoft Windows in computers before their purchase

The bundling of Microsoft Windows is the installation of Microsoft Windows on computers before their purchase. Microsoft encourages original equipment manufacturers (OEMs) of personal computers to include Windows licenses, OEM software (including bloatware) and OEM drivers with their products, and agreements between Microsoft and OEMs have undergone antitrust scrutiny. Users opposed to the bundling of Microsoft Windows, including Linux users, have sought refunds for Windows licenses, arguing that the Windows end-user license agreement entitles them to return unused Windows licenses for a cash refund. Although some customers have successfully obtained payments (in some cases after litigation or lengthy negotiations), others have been less successful.

== The "Windows tax" ==
Microsoft encourages original equipment manufacturers (OEMs) to supply computers with Windows pre-installed, saying that purchasers benefit by not having to install an operating system. Analyst Vishal Tripathi said that many people purchase PCs with pre-installed operating systems because they do not want to deal with the "learning curve" and inconvenience of installing an operating system. Virtually all large computer vendors bundle Microsoft Windows with the majority of the personal computers in their ranges. In 1999, Maximum PC wrote that non-Windows users "have long griped that machines from large companies can't be purchased without Windows". In 1999, analyst Rob Enderle attributed the lack of computers without Windows available for individual purchase to economic impracticality, citing certification and warranty requirements. In 1999, Dell stated that it only offered non-Microsoft operating systems on servers and as part of customized large orders, but if Linux became popular enough to make Linux pre-installation cost-effective, "we'd be foolish not to offer it". The Guardian's computer editor Jack Schofield claimed that there were significant cost overheads associated with preinstalling Linux, in part due to Linux's small market share, although Schofield had generally viewed Microsoft's bundling practices favourably, claiming in 1995 that Microsoft's incentives were not unlike promotional deals in other industries and that "Microsoft cannot be accused of beating PC manufacturers with a stick: at worst it is beating them with a carrot", despite the well-established competitive impact of such practices on suppliers of competing systems software, acknowledged in a 1994 settlement with Novell. Serdar Yegulalp of Computerworld said that in the late 1990s, because Linux was not fully developed, Linux computers were "a tough sell for non-technical users".

Microsoft historically engaged in licensing practices that discouraged the installation of non-Microsoft operating systems. Microsoft once assessed license fees based on the number of computers an OEM sold, regardless of whether a Windows license was included. Beginning in 1983, Microsoft sold MS-DOS licenses to OEMs on an individually negotiated basis. The contracts required OEMs to purchase a number of MS-DOS licenses equal to or greater than the number of computers sold, with the result of zero marginal cost for OEMs to include MS-DOS. Installing an operating system other than MS-DOS would effectively require double payment of operating system royalties. Also, Microsoft penalized OEMs that installed alternative operating systems by making their license terms less favorable. Microsoft entered into a consent decree in 1994 that barred them from conditioning the availability of Windows licenses or varying their prices based on whether OEMs distributed other operating systems. Microsoft General Counsel Brad Smith said that the decree was effective in allowing Dell and HP to offer Linux computers, and Jeremy Reimer of Ars Technica stated that the decree made it "fiscally realistic to sell computers with alternative operating systems". In 1999, a Microsoft representative stated that their contracts with OEMs did not "stop any OEM from shipping any operating system on their PCs". In 2010, Microsoft stated that its agreements with OEMs to distribute Windows are nonexclusive, and OEMs are free to distribute computers with a different operating system or without any operating system. In a 2001 article in Byte, it was reported that license agreements between OEMs and Microsoft forbade OEMs from including Windows alongside another operating system on the same computer. According to a 1999 New York Times article, "critics assert that the company continues to use its market clout to ensure that nearly all new personal computers come with Windows pre-installed."

In 2009, Microsoft stated that it has always charged OEMs about $50 for a Windows license on a $1,000 computer. In 2007, Dell stated that its computers with Ubuntu installed would be priced about $50 lower than comparable systems with Windows installed. In a 2010 ZDNet article, Chris Clay wrote that Dell computers with Ubuntu preinstalled were priced higher than identical systems with Windows preinstalled, even though Ubuntu is distributed gratis. The claimed increase in the price of a computer resulting from the inclusion of a Windows license has been called the "Windows tax" or "Microsoft tax" by opposing computer users.

Some computer purchasers request refunds for Windows licenses included with their purchased computers because they do not want to use Windows, preferring an operating system such as Linux instead. Jeff Walsh of InfoWorld said that businesses with site licenses can save money by requesting refunds of Windows licenses included with purchased computers.

Users can avoid the "Windows tax" altogether by assembling a computer from individually purchased parts or purchasing a computer from an OEM that does not bundle Windows. Some smaller OEMs and larger retail chains such as System76 have taken to specializing in Linux-based systems to their advantage from major suppliers' paucity of non-Windows offerings. Beginning in 2007, Dell offered computers with Ubuntu pre-installed. In 2014, Hewlett-Packard stated that it sells "units bundled with a built-in OS and those without". Some Linux distributors also run 'partnership' programs to endorse suppliers of machines with their system pre-installed. Some vendors purchase computers from major OEMs, install Linux on them and resell them. Chris Clay of ZDNet wrote that employee discount programs create a financial incentive to purchase computers from a large manufacturer, even if the manufacturer does not offer computers without Windows.

== Boot locking concerns ==
Microsoft requires that OEMs support UEFI secure boot on their products to qualify for the Windows 8 Logo [case badge] Program. Concerns have been raised that OEMs might ship systems that do not allow users to disable secure boot or install signing keys for alternative operating systems. Such computers would be unable to boot any non-Windows operating system (unless that operating system was signed and its keys included with the computer), further complicating the issue of Windows refunds. While Microsoft claims the OEMs would be free to decide which keys to include and how to manage them, competing OS vendors' relative lack of influence on the desktop OS market compared to Microsoft might mean that, even if signed versions of their operating systems were available, they might face difficulties getting hardware vendors to include their keys, especially if end users won't be able to manage those keys themselves. Boot locking was required for Windows Phone and RT devices, but not for Windows 10 Connected PCs. In January 2012, Microsoft confirmed it would require hardware manufacturers to enable secure boot on Windows 8 devices, and that x86/64 devices must provide the option to turn it off while ARM-based devices must not provide the option to turn it off.

== License refund policy ==
Microsoft does not provide refunds for Windows licenses sold through an OEM, including licenses that come with the purchase of a computer or are pre-installed on a computer. A Microsoft Denmark representative stated that Microsoft's Windows license terms allow OEMs to offer a refund for just the Windows license. Microsoft's End User License Agreement for Windows 11 states that:

By accepting this agreement or using the software, you agree to all of these terms, and consent to the transmission of certain information during activation and during your use of the software as per the privacy statement described in Section 3. If you do not accept and comply with these terms, you may not use the software or its features. You may contact the device manufacturer or installer, or your retailer if you purchased the software directly, to determine its return policy and return the software or device for a refund or credit under that policy. You must comply with that policy, which might require you to return the software with the entire device on which the software is installed for a refund or credit, if any.

In 1999, the relevant text read

If you do not agree to the terms of this EULA, PC Manufacturer and Microsoft are unwilling to license the SOFTWARE PRODUCT to you. In such event, you may not use or copy the SOFTWARE PRODUCT, and you should promptly contact PC Manufacturer for instructions on return of the unused product(s) for a refund.

In 1999, according to InfoWorld, "Some users are taking this EULA literally and plan to demand a cash refund." In 1999, a Microsoft representative described requesting a Windows refund on the basis of rejecting the license as "a technicality where someone is twisting the language a little bit to come up with the idea that they can run back to the OEM with this". Laurie J. Flynn of The New York Times characterized the license refund argument as using a loophole in the license agreement.

OEM policies for refunding unused Windows licenses vary. Some OEMs have programs that specifically allow a user to receive a refund for an unused Windows license. Acer US has a Windows refund program where a user can ship a computer with an unused copy of Windows to the Acer service center and have the computer returned without Windows for a refund. Acer's policy requires the customer to return items at their own expense, and the balance received by the customer can be as low as €30. The same applies for EU, the reported refund as of 2014 is €40 for Windows 8. Other vendors, like Dell, have ad hoc procedures for users to request a refund of a Windows license; one user who received a £55.23 refund from Dell said of the process, "I was pretty gob-smacked that it was so easy". In some cases, vendors have asked that customers requesting refunds sign non-disclosure agreements. In 1999, a Toshiba representative stated that a case where a user obtained a $110 refund was "not the typical policy and not what other people will run into if they try it". Other vendors do not issue refunds for Windows licenses. In February 1999 InfoWorld reported that "No PC manufacturers are currently offering refunds for users who do not use Windows". According to a 1999 Maximum PC article, Dell did not provide refunds for Windows licenses, interpreting the license agreement to "treat the hardware and software as a single package that must be returned". In 2009, Sony refused to offer a partial refund for a customer who declined the Windows Vista EULA, instead offering a refund for the entire computer, which the customer declined.

Litigation by users denied a partial refund for an unused Windows license has resulted in rulings in France and Italy that bundling Microsoft Windows and then refusing to offer partial refunds for just the Windows license violates applicable law. In September 2014, the Supreme Court of Italy in ruling 19161/2014 decided that a laptop buyer was entitled to receive a refund of €140 for the price of a Microsoft Windows license and a Microsoft Works license on a computer, saying that bundling was "a commercial policy of forced distribution" and called this practice "monopolistic in tendency", confirmed later with ruling 4390/2016. In December 2020, the Court of Monza (Italy) in ruling 1734/2020 imposed upon the manufacturer punitive damages amounting to €20,000 for abuse of the appeal procedures. In India, bundling is challenged by users as a violation of Competition Act 2002; one Indian citizen has sent a legal notice to HP. However, in another license refund case, a French appellate court ruled in favor of the OEM, "holding that the sale at issue did not constitute the unfair commercial practice of coercive selling, which is not permitted under any circumstances, an unfair commercial tying practice, or a misleading or aggressive commercial practice." The case is pending before the Court of Cassation.

In September 2016, the Court of Justice of the European Union ruled that "the sale of a computer equipped with pre-installed software does not in itself constitute an unfair commercial practice within the meaning of Directive 2005/29 when such an offer is not contrary to the requirements of professional diligence and does not distort the economic behaviour of [purchasers]." The Court also ruled that Directive 2005/29 does not require OEMs to include a separate price for an operating system license.

== Public response ==
Websites have been created for the specific purpose of spreading information about the issue and educating others on their options for getting a refund. A 1999 rally opposing the bundling of Windows attracted about 100 protesters and gained media attention worldwide. The overall goal of such events has been to get OEMs to expand their selection of computers without a copy of Windows pre-installed, with the additional goal of getting them to revise and improve their refund policies while the first goal has not been met. An analyst stated that refund actions by individual users were "a publicity stunt [that] has no impact".
