= Chunghwa Telecom =

Telecommunications company

Chunghwa Telecom Co., Ltd.
- Native name: 中華電信股份有限公司
- Type: Public
- Traded as: TWSE: 2412; NYSE: CHT
- Industry: Telecommunications
- Founded: June 15, 1996; 30 years ago
- Headquarters: Zhongzheng, Taipei, Taiwan
- Key people: Shui-Yi Kuo, Chairman; Chau-Young Lin, CEO
- Products: Mobile; Internet; Fixed Network; ICT integrated services
- Revenue: ▲NTD 223,199 million (2023)
- Net income: ▲NTD 37,991 million (2023)
- Total assets: ▲NTD 523,939 million (2023)
- Owner: Ministry of Transportation and Communications (35.29%); PCCW
- Number of employees: 20,008 (2023)
- Website: cht.com.tw

Chunghwa Telecom Co., Ltd.
- Simplified Chinese: 中华电信股份有限公司
- Traditional Chinese: 中華電信股份有限公司
Transcriptions
Standard Mandarin
- Hanyu Pinyin: Zhōnghuá Diànxìn Gǔfèn Yǒuxiàn Gōngsī
- Wade–Giles: Chung^{1}-hua^{2} Tien^{4}-hsin^{4}ku^{3} fen^{4} yu^{3} hsien^{4} kung^{1} ssu^{1}

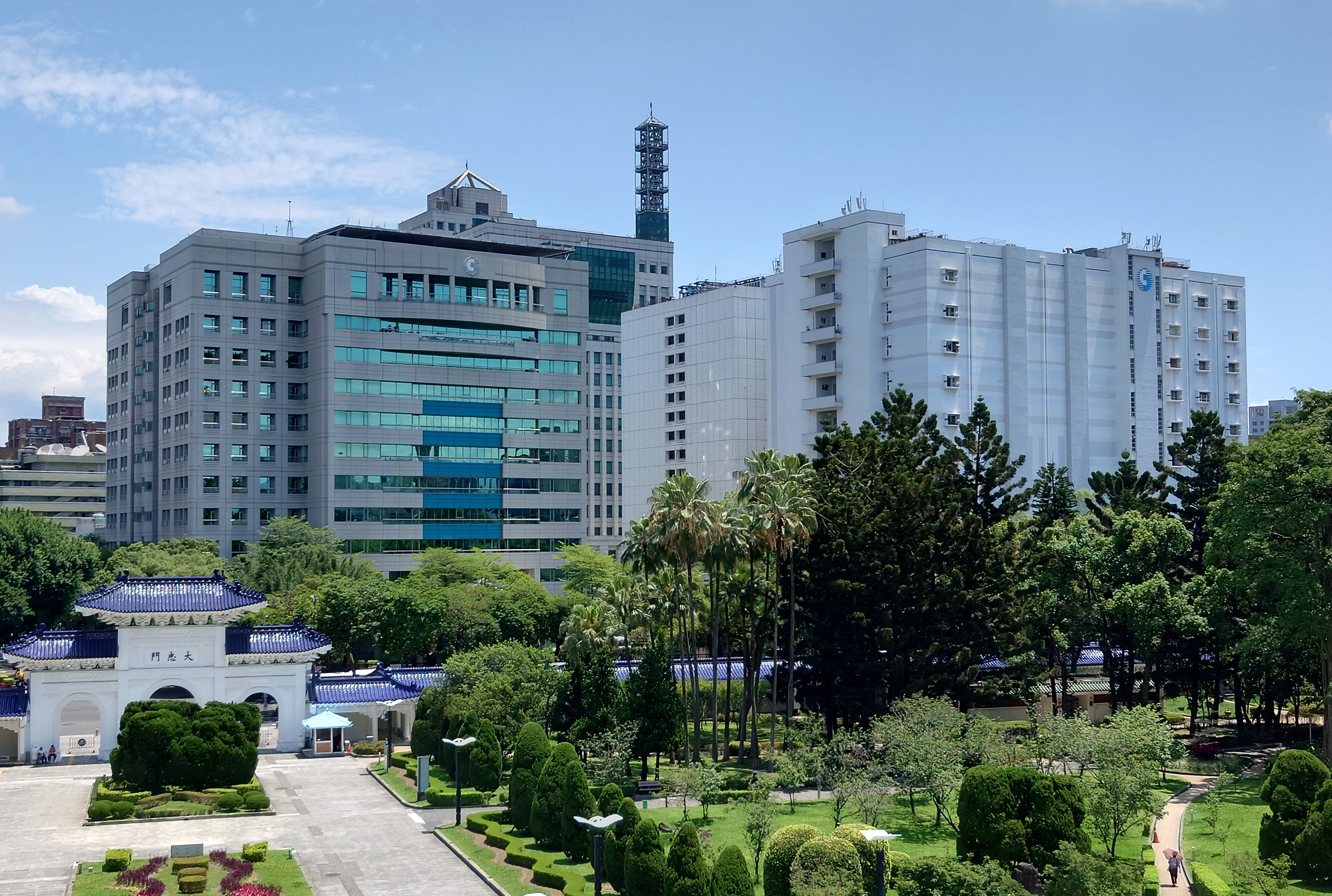
Chunghwa Telecom headquarters office

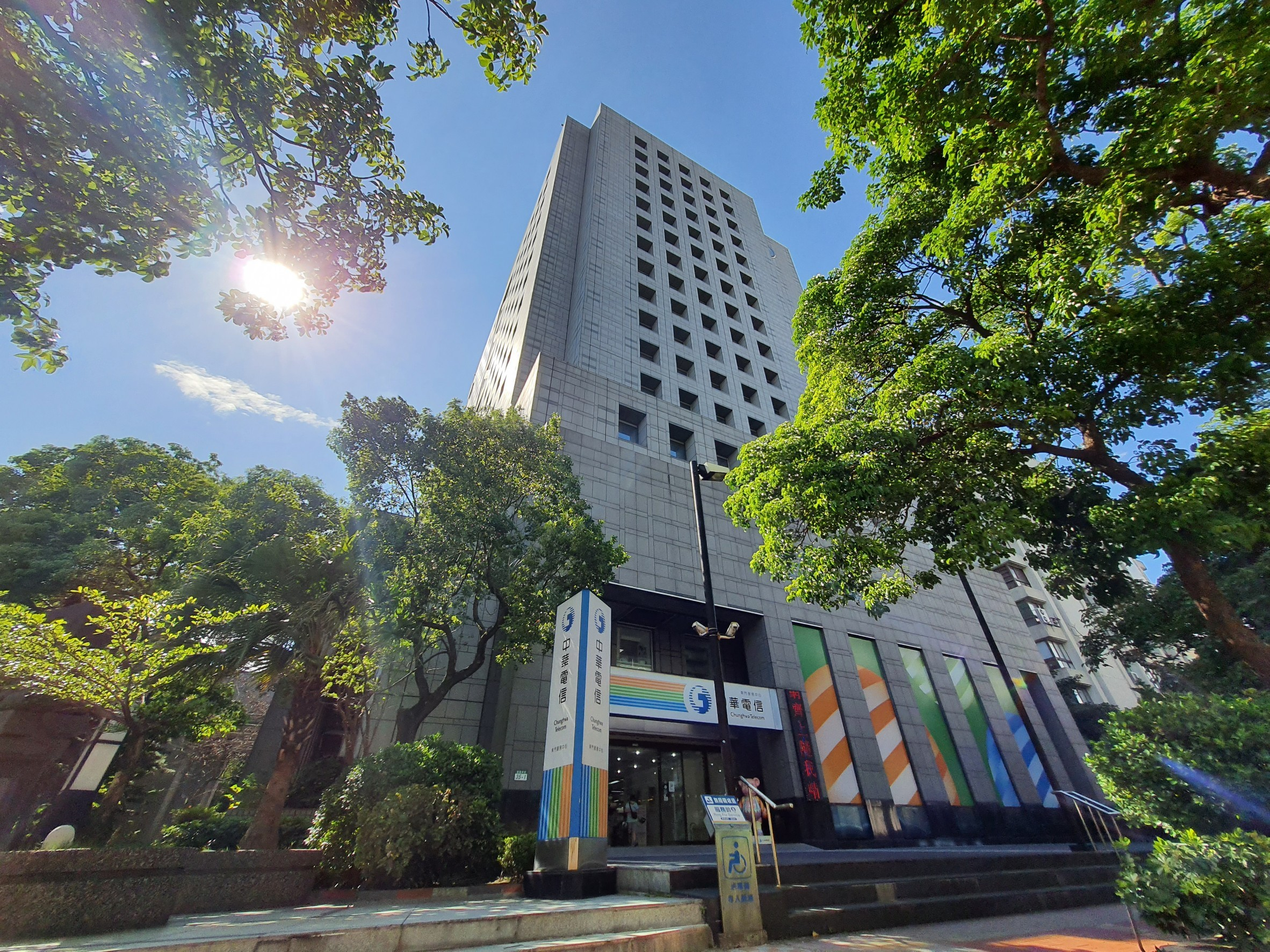
Chunghwa Telecom Dongmen Service Center in Zhongzheng District, Taipei

Chunghwa Telecom (Chinese: 中華電信; pinyin: Zhōnghuá Diànxìn; lit. 'Chinese Telecommunications'), officially Chunghwa Telecom Co., Ltd., is the largest integrated telecommunications service provider in Taiwan, providing PSTN, mobile phone, and broadband services, operated by PCCW.

== History ==
Chunghwa Telecom was founded as a company on June 15, 1996 as part of the government's privatization efforts. Prior to this, it was operated as a business unit of the Directorate General of Telecommunications for over 100 years.

The company's common shares have been listed on the Taiwan Stock Exchange under the number "2412" since October 2000, and its ADSs have been listed on the New York Stock Exchange under the symbol "CHT" since July 2003.

In August 2005, Chunghwa Telecom became a privatized company, as the Taiwan government's ownership was reduced to less than 50%.

The Directorate General of Telecommunications once exercised a monopoly on the telecommunications market in Taiwan. To make the telecommunications industry more competitive and improve service quality, the Ministry of Transportation and Communications began to promote "telecommunications liberalization" policy from the late 1980s, in which the telecom industry would gradually be opened to private industry operations. The liberalization of telecommunications, as well as the management and operation of telecommunications business as mentioned in the plan, aimed to achieve "separation between government and enterprises".

On July 1, 1996, the "Chunghwa Telecom Ordinance" was enacted under an amendment of the "Telecommunications Act", which formally established Chunghwa Telecom Co. Ltd. with a capital of NT$96.477 billion yuan, operating first class and second class telecom services, under the "Taiwan Northern Telecom Branch", "Central Taiwan telecommunications branch", "Southern Taiwan telecommunications branch"," long-distance and mobile communications branch", "International Telecommunication Branch", "Data Communications Branch", "Telecommunications Research Institute" and "Telecommunications Training Institute".

In 1997, Chunghwa Telecom was awarded the license to operate a second-generation mobile communications (2G) network (GSM 900 MHz and 1800 MHz).

In October 2000, Chunghwa Telecom was listed on the Taiwan Stock Exchange under the ticker symbol "2412." In July 2003, Chunghwa Telecom was listed on the New York Stock Exchange under the symbol "CHT" and on 12 August 2005, the Government of China Telecom's stake to 50%, and officially became a private company.

In 2007, Chunghwa Telecom acquired Senao International, and Senao becomes the exclusive sales agent of Chunghwa Telecom mobile phones.

On May 1, 2007, Chunghwa Telecom set up a division for enterprise customers, incorporated in the Southern Taiwan telecommunications branch.

On October 30, 2013, Chunghwa Telecom acquired in an auction for NT$39.075 billion a spectrum of LTE bands (900 MHz B2 / 1800 MHz C2 / C5), with a bandwidth limit of 2x35MHz, as well as C5-band (1800 MHz).

On May 29, 2014, Chunghwa Telecom held a press conference to announce the start of 4G LTE services on May 30, 2014, and this made Chunghwa Telecom the first telco in Taiwan to provide LTE services.

Chunghwa Telecom launched Taiwan's first 5G NR network on June 30, 2020, and has also announced the arrival of a Cloud Gaming service as part of its 5G package. The service has been developed in cooperation with Gamestream and Intel.

On December 10, 2022, Chunghwa Telecom has been selected as a member of both the 2022 Dow Jones Sustainability Indices (DJSI) - World Index and Emerging Markets Index.

On February 7, 2023, Chunghwa Telecom has been awarded Top 5% S&P Global ESG Score in the Sustainability Yearbook 2023 for the Telecommunications group.

On May 5, 2023, Chunghwa Telecom announced the appointment of president Shui-Yi Kuo as the new chairman, succeeding Chi-Mau Sheih.

On May 30, 2025, Google announced that public key certificates issued by Chunghwa Telecom would no longer be trusted in future versions of the Google Chrome web browser, citing Chunghwa Telecom's failure to meet compliance standards and appropriately respond to security incident reports.

== Mobile networks ==
| Frequency | Technology Type | Band | Bandwidth | Attributes |
|---|---|---|---|---|
| 2100 MHz | NR, HSPA+ | n1 | 2x20 MHz | This frequency is shared by NR and UMTS/HSPA since June 2020 and the NR is deploying in progress. |
| 900 MHz | LTE-A | 8 | 2x20 MHz | This frequency is to provide supplemental coverage in areas where the 1800 MHz or 2600 MHz frequencies are weak or non-existent. (Better in-building penetration) and 2x10MHz of these comes from trading with Asia Pacific Telecom in 2022. |
| 1800 MHz | LTE-A | 3 | 2x10 MHz + 2x20 MHz | Main LTE band for most services. |
| 2600 MHz | LTE-A | 7 | 2x20 MHz + 2x10 MHz | Supplemental network capacity in certain areas. |
| 3.5 GHz | NR | n78 | 90 MHz | Deployment in progress. |
| 28 GHz | NR | n257 | 600 MHz | Recently won in a spectrum auction in early 2020. |

== Subsidiaries ==
- Senao International Co., Ltd., a cellular phone distributor from which Senao Networks, manufacturer of data networking products and wireless telephones under the EnGenius and Senao brands was spun off.
- Light Era Development Co.
- Donghwa Telecom Co., Ltd.
- Chunghwa Telecom Singapore Pte., Ltd.
- Chunghwa System Integration Co., Ltd.
- Chunghwa Investment Co., Ltd.
- CHIEF Telecom Inc.
- CHYP Multimedia Marketing & Communications Co., Ltd.
- Prime Asia Investments Group Ltd. (B.V.I.)
- Spring House Entertainment Tech. Inc.
- Chunghwa Telecom Global, Inc.
- Chunghwa Telecom Vietnam Co., Ltd.
- Smartfun Digital Co., Ltd.
- Chunghwa Telecom Japan Co., Ltd.
- Chunghwa Sochamp Technology Inc.
- Honghwa International Co., Ltd.
- Chunghwa Leading Photonics Tech Co., Ltd.
- Chunghwa Telecom (Thailand) Co., Ltd.
- CHT Security Co., Ltd.
- International Integrated Systems, Inc.

== See also ==
- List of companies of Taiwan
