= Taiwan Stock Exchange =

Stock exchange based in Taiwan

- 臺灣證券交易所

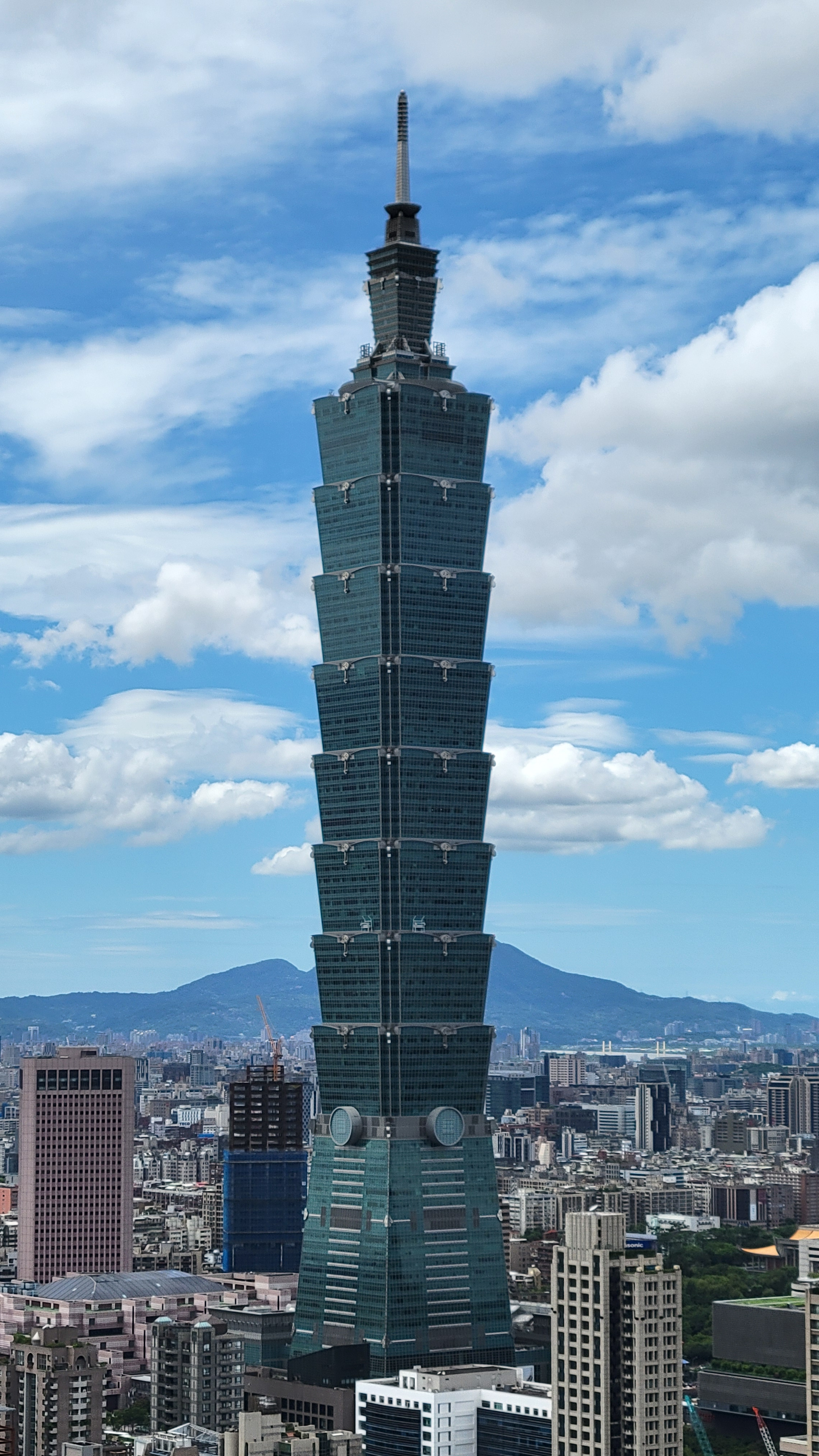
- TWSE is located in Taipei 101
- Type: Stock exchange
- Location: Taipei 101, Taipei, Taiwan
- Coordinates: 25°2′1″N 121°33′54″E
- Founded: 23 October 1961; 65 years ago
- Owner: Taiwan Stock Exchange Corporation
- Currency: New Taiwan dollar
- No. of listings: 1,085
- Indices: Taiwan Weighted (TAIEX)
- Website: twse.com.tw

Taiwan Stock Exchange
- Traditional Chinese: 臺灣證券交易所
Transcriptions
Standard Mandarin
- Hanyu Pinyin: Táiwān Zhèngquàn Jiāoyìsuǒ
- Wade–Giles: T′ai²-wan¹ Chêng⁴-ch′üan⁴ Chiao¹-i⁴-suo³
Hakka
- Pha̍k-fa-sṳ: Thòi-vàn Chṳn-khién Kâu-yi-só
Southern Min
- Hokkien POJ: Tâi-oân Chèng-kǹg Kau-e̍k-só͘
- Tâi-lô: Tâi-uân Tsìng-kǹg Kau-i̍k-sóo

Alternative Chinese name
- Traditional Chinese: 證交所
Transcriptions
Standard Mandarin
- Hanyu Pinyin: Zhèngjiāosuǒ
- Wade–Giles: Chêng⁴-chiao-suo³
Hakka
- Pha̍k-fa-sṳ: Chṳn-kâu-só
Southern Min
- Hokkien POJ: Chèng-kau-só͘
- Tâi-lô: Tsìng-kau-sóo

Market data on display at Taiwan Stock Exchange

The Taiwan Stock Exchange Corporation (TWSE; Chinese: 臺灣證券交易所) is a financial institution, headquartered at Taipei 101, in Taipei, Taiwan. The TWSE was established in 1961 and began operating as a stock exchange on 9 February 1962. It is regulated by the Financial Supervisory Commission.

TWSE-listed securities currently include stocks, as well as exchange-traded funds (ETFs), exchange-traded notes (ETNs), warrants, Taiwan Depositary Receipts (TDRs), and other securities. The Taiwan Capitalization Weighted Stock Index (TAIEX) is the stock market index that measures the aggregate performance of listed stocks on the TWSE; it is regarded as one of the key indicators of Taiwan's economic performance.

The TWSE is responsible for securities listing reviews, trading mechanisms, clearing and settlement, regulation of securities firms, corporate governance and sustainable development initiatives, market surveillance, and investor services. It also provides corporate disclosures and integrated market information through the Market Observation Post System (MOPS) and the Investment InfoHub.

As of 31 December 2025, the TAIEX closed at 28,963.6 points, while the total market capitalization of listed shares reached NT$94.36 trillion. Total annual trading value amounted to NT$101 trillion, with an average daily trading value of NT$416 billion.

As of 2026, Taiwan's stock market has become the world's fifth-largest by market capitalization, with a total market value of US$4.95 trillion, surpassing markets including the United Kingdom, Canada, and India.

== History and development ==
The Taiwan Stock Exchange's current headquarters in Taipei 101, showing its first-floor information exhibition center

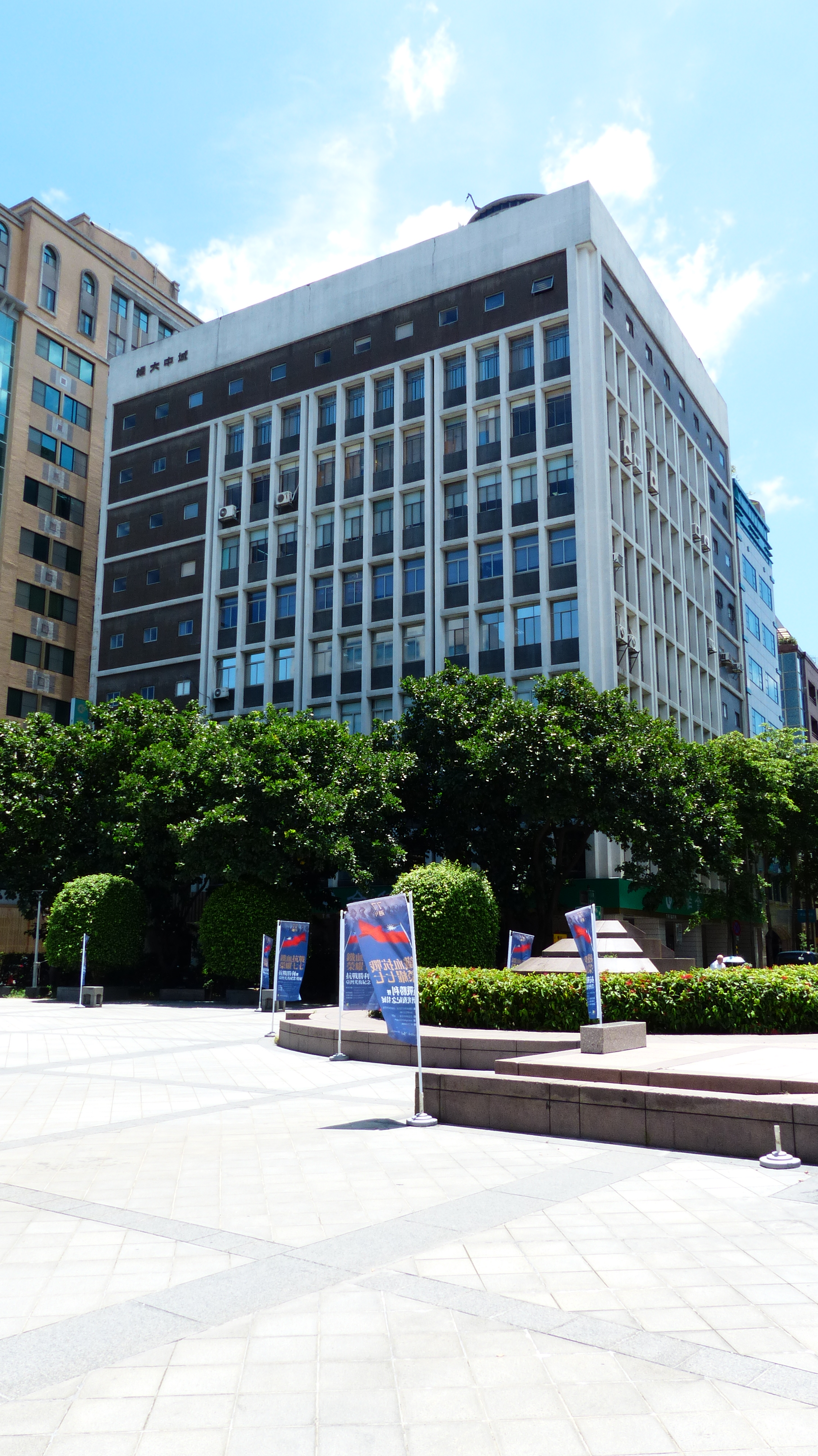
The Chengzhong Building in Zhongzheng District, Taipei, which housed the Taiwan Stock Exchange from 1972 to 1999

1961–1980

Establishment

On 23 October 1961, an inaugural promoters' meeting was held in accordance with the law, at which the company's articles of incorporation were approved and directors and supervisors were elected. Later that month, the first joint meeting of the board of directors and supervisors was held, during which the company's senior management, including its president and vice president, was selected, marking the formal establishment of the TWSE. The exchange officially commenced operations on 9 February 1962.

1981–2000

Transition to computerized trading

Beginning in the 1980s, the TWSE began computerizing its trading and market management operations. In 1988, all stock trading migrated to the semi-automated Computer-Assisted Trading System (CATS). In 1993, trading in all listed shares was transferred to a Fully Automated Securities Trading (FAST) system, and a real-time market surveillance system was introduced.

International participation

In 1982, the TWSE became one of the founding members of the East Asian Oceanian Stock Exchanges Federation (EAOSEF), which was later renamed the Asian and Oceanian Stock Exchanges Federation (AOSEF). In 1989, it joined the Fédération Internationale des Bourses de Valeurs (FIBV), the predecessor of the World Federation of Exchanges (WFE).

2001–2020

Market reforms

In January 2001, regular trading hours were extended to 9:00 a.m.–1:30 p.m. on weekdays. In 2009, the TWSE adopted the T+2 DVP settlement system and introduced the Financial Information eXchange (FIX) protocol. In 2015, the daily price fluctuation limit was widened from 7% to 10%.

In March 2020, the TWSE implemented intraday continuous trading. New order types were also introduced, including market orders, Rest of Day (ROD), Immediate or Cancel (IOC), and Fill or Kill (FOK) orders, providing investors with additional order options.

Corporate governance initiatives

In 2013, the TWSE established its Corporate Governance Center as a platform for promoting corporate governance and information disclosure among listed companies. The first Corporate Governance Evaluation was conducted in 2014; the program was subsequently renamed the ESG Evaluation. In 2016, the TWSE introduced the Corporation Standards Governing Principal.

Index compilation and cooperation

In addition to compiling the TAIEX, the TWSE and the Taipei Exchange launched the co-compiled Formosa Index in May 2014 as a measure of the overall performance of Taiwan's securities market. In January 2016, the Taiwan Index Plus Corporation was established. Beginning in December of the same year, the TWSE cooperated with FTSE Russell to compile the FTSE TWSE Taiwan Index Series, including the FTSE TWSE Taiwan 50 Index, Taiwan Mid-Cap 100 Index, Taiwan Technology Index, Taiwan Dividend+ Index, and other indices.

Information infrastructure

Given the high demand for IT system stability in securities trading and related services, the TWSE signed a memorandum of understanding with Chunghwa Telecom in February 2008 for the construction of a new data center. The First Data Center was completed and opened in January 2016.

2021–present

Establishment of the Taiwan Innovation Board

In July 2021, the TWSE launched the Taiwan Innovation Board (TIB), focusing on the listing of companies with key technologies, innovative capabilities, or innovative business models. In 2025, the TIB canceled the restrictions on qualified investors, and TIB stocks became eligible for intraday trading.

Initiation of the "Power Up Plan"

Since 2024, the TWSE has encouraged listed companies to formulate and disclose their mid-long term business strategies and strengthen communication with investors. In October 2026, it launched the “Power Up Plan 2.0”, further expanding the initiative and, for the first time, allowing eligible listed companies to disclose forecast information. The TWSE also launched the Power Up InfoHub, integrating information related to corporate value-related information, IR engagement services to facilitate communication between listed companies and institutional investors.

Diversification of market mechanisms and products

In 2024, the matching interval for intraday odd-lot trading was shortened from one minute to five seconds, and settlement-driven securities borrowing and lending was extended to odd-lot securities. Taiwan's first actively managed exchange-traded fund was listed in 2025.

In January 2026, the Taiwan Index Plus Corporation launched the Taiwan Pristine Stock Index, which selects Taiwan listed common stocks based on profitability, dividends, and trading characteristics, serving as a benchmark to track high-quality but overlooked stocks.

Sustainable development

In the area of sustainable development, an ESG information disclosure platform within the MOPS was launched in 2022, to centralize disclosures by listed and OTC companies on greenhouse gas inventories, emissions reduction targets, sustainability reports, and other ESG-related information.

In May 2023, in response to Taiwan's national climate change policies, the TWSE and the National Development Fund Management Committee jointly established the Taiwan Carbon Solution Exchange. The exchange was officially launched on 7 August 2023.

== Market structure ==
The TWSE has operated the General Board and the Taiwan Innovation Board, which was established in July 2021.

=== General Board ===
Domestic companies may apply for listing as general enterprises, technology-based enterprises, cultural and creative enterprises, or enterprises involved in national economic reconstruction projects. Listing requirements vary by company type, imposing different standards on duration of corporate existence, amount of capital stock, profitability, etc.

=== Taiwan Innovation Board (TIB) ===
The TIB uses market capitalization as its core review standard. It is designed to help companies with key technologies, innovative capabilities or business models access the capital market. In recent years, the TWSE has relaxed multiple regulations to boost trading liquidity on the TIB, such as lifting the restrictions on qualified investors, permitting day trading, and introducing flexible board transfer mechanisms.

== Trading mechanism ==
In the stock exchange market, all securities are executed on a continuous basis during intraday regular trading sessions, and are matched by call auction at the opening and closing of the regular trading session. The trading unit of stocks is 1,000 shares, while orders below 1,000 shares may be considered as odd-lot orders.

Orders are divided into six types, as shown in the chart below. The daily price variation limit is 10%, and the intraday volatility interruption mechanism is used to stabilize prices. For after-hours fixed-price trading, intraday odd-lot trading, block trading, and other trading mechanisms, the trading hours, ordering, and matching method are separately specified.

Price	Duration	Applicable session
Limit order	ROD	Opening and closing session, continuous trading session, during intra-day volatility interruption
Limit order	IOC	Continuous trading session
Limit order	FOK	Continuous trading session
Market order	ROD	Continuous trading session
Market order	IOC	Continuous trading session
Market order	FOK	Continuous trading session

Trading days are from Monday to Friday, with order placing hours from 08:30 to 13:30, trading hours from 09:00 to 13:30. The market is closed for national holidays and other closure days declared by the TWSE. Furthermore, on make-up workdays that fall on a Saturday, neither trading nor settlement is conducted.

Session	Matching Method
Opening session (08:30-09:00)	Call auction
Intraday trading session (09:00-13:25)	Continuous trading, except when intraday volatility interruption is triggered. In such cases, matching is postponed for two minutes and then the trades are matched by call auction.
Closing session (13:25-13:30)	Call auction

After a trade is executed, investors are required to deliver fund/securities to-be-paid to securities firms by 10:00 a.m. on T+2. On the securities firm side, they are required to complete the settlement of securities to-be-paid to TWSE by T+2 10:00 a.m., and the settlement of funds to-be-paid by 11:00 a.m.

== Listing requirements ==
When a domestic company applies for listing, it must first submit an application to the TWSE. After the TWSE reviews the documents, the application is submitted for approval by the TWSE Listing Review Committee and TWSE Board. Once approved, the TWSE sends the contract to the Financial Supervisory Commission to be recorded. The applicant company then mandates an underwriter to offer, issue, and underwrite the shares. Finally, the company applies for trading on the TWSE, determines the date of listing, and officially starts trading on the TWSE.

General enterprises applying for listing must meet criteria regarding the duration of corporate existence, amount of capital stock, profitability, dispersion of share ownership, etc. For technology-based enterprises, cultural and creative enterprises, important enterprises involved in national economic reconstruction projects or major national public construction projects encouraged by the government, the listing requirements impose different standards.

The listing requirements of the TIB are as follows:

Category	Market capitalization	Working capital and other requirements
Category I	At least NT$1 billion	Sufficient working capital for 12 months following listing; aggregate operating revenue for the last four quarters is at least NT$100 million
Category II (biotechnology and medical enterprises only)	At least NT$2 billion	Working capital covering 125% for the 12 months at least after listing; pharmaceutical company’s core product - new drug must have completed Phase I clinical trials
Category III	At least NT$4 billion	Working capital covering 125% for the 12 months at least after listing

Listed companies in Taiwan operate across a wide range of industries, including semiconductors, electronic components, traditional industries, and financial services. As of September 2026, 1,085 companies were listed on the TWSE.

== ETF issuance and trading ==
From the issuance stage to listing, an ETF must go through several procedures, including index review, public offering registration/ application review, fund establishment, and listing application. The overall process takes around 3 to 4 months.

After being listed, an ETF can be created/redeemed in the primary market or traded in the secondary market.

In the primary market, ETF units are created and redeemed through either in-kind or cash creation/ redemption mechanisms. Currently, most ETFs adopt cash creation/ redemption, only certain ETFs tracking Taiwan equities allow in-kind creation/ redemption.

In the secondary market, ETFs are traded similarly to stocks, and retail investors may buy and sell ETF units through securities trading accounts. The TWSE establishes trading rules for ETFs, including trading unit, tick size, price fluctuation limits, trading hours, margin trading, day-trading, etc.

== See also ==
- Taiwan Capitalization Weighted Stock Index
- List of companies in Taiwan
- List of Asian stock exchanges
- List of stock exchanges
- CCP Global
