= 12th ALMA Awards =

2011 US film and television awards ceremony

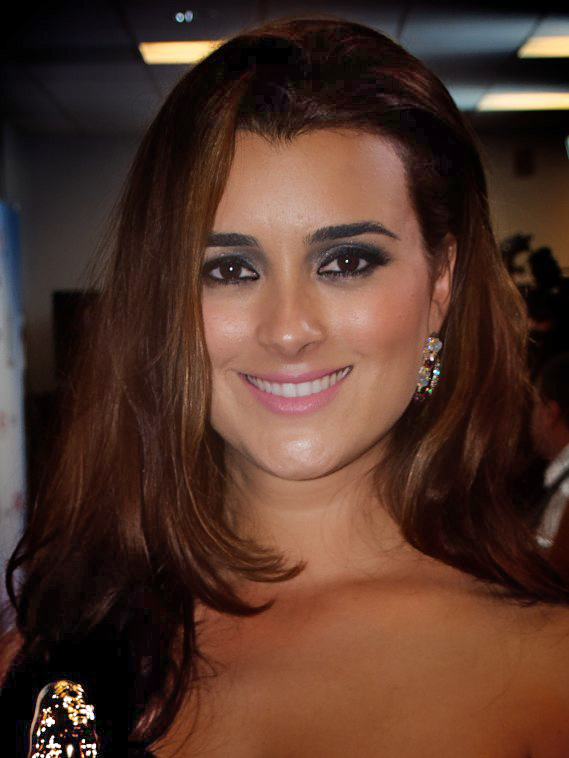
- Cote de Pablo at the 2011 Alma Awards.
- Date: September 10, 2011
- Site: Santa Monica Civic Auditorium, Santa Monica, California
- Hosted by: Eva Longoria and George Lopez
- Official website: www.almaawards.com

Television coverage
- Network: NBC

The 12th ALMA Awards honored the accomplishments made by Hispanics in film, television, and music in 2010. This ceremony marked the return of the ALMA Awards after being cancelled the prior year and the first of two consecutive years the show aired on NBC after having previously aired on ABC for 9 years.

The ceremony was held on September 10, 2011, at the Santa Monica Civic Auditorium. The awards were hosted by George Lopez and Eva Longoria, with musical performances by Pitbull, Demi Lovato and Gloria Estefan.

== Winners and nominees ==
The following is a list of the nominees from film, television, and music. Winners are listed first and highlighted in bold:

=== Honorary awards ===
- **Raymond Telles** received the **Outstanding Career Achievement – Documentarian Award**.
- **Cynthia Cidre** received the **Outstanding Career Achievement – Writer Award**.
- **Gregory Nava** received the **Outstanding Career Achievement – Director Award**.
- **The Harvest** received the **Special Achievement Award**.
- **AltaMed Health Services Corporation** received the **2011 Pepsico Alma Adelante Award**.

=== Film ===
Favorite Movie	Favorite Movie Actor
**A Better Life**; From Prada to Nada; Machete; Rio; Spy Kids 4: All the Time in the World	**Antonio Banderas** – You Will Meet a Tall Dark Stranger; Demián Bichir – A Better Life; Bobby Cannavale – Win Win; Michael Peña – Battle: Los Angeles; Danny Trejo – Machete
Favorite Movie Actress – Drama/Adventure	Favorite Movie Actress – Comedy/Musical
**Jessica Alba** – Machete; Penélope Cruz – Pirates of the Caribbean: On Stranger Tides; Rosario Dawson – Unstoppable; Michelle Rodriguez – Battle: Los Angeles; Zoe Saldaña – Takers	**Alexa Vega** – From Prada to Nada; Christina Aguilera – Burlesque; Cameron Diaz – Bad Teacher; Selena Gomez – Monte Carlo; Eva Mendes – The Other Guys

=== Television ===
Favorite TV Series	Favorite TV Reality, Variety, or Comedy Personality or Act
**Desperate Housewives**; CSI: Miami; Modern Family; Wizards of Waverly Place	**George Lopez** – Lopez Tonight; Christina Aguilera – The Voice; Jennifer Lopez – American Idol; Mario Lopez – Mario Lopez: Saved by the Baby; Cesar Millan – Dog Whisperer with Cesar Millan
Favorite TV Actor – Leading Role	Favorite TV Actor – Supporting Role
**Adam Rodriguez** – CSI: Miami; Ricardo Chavira – Desperate Housewives; Ian Gomez – Cougar Town; Joshua Gomez – Chuck; James Roday – Psych	**Rico Rodriguez** – Modern Family; Oscar Nuñez – The Office; Michael Trevino – The Vampire Diaries; Tristan Wilds – 90210; David Zayas – Dexter
Favorite TV Actress – Leading Role in a Drama	Favorite TV Actress – Leading Role in a Comedy
**Cote de Pablo** – NCIS; Eva LaRue – CSI: Miami; Francia Raisa – The Secret Life of the American Teenager; Sara Ramirez – Grey's Anatomy; Sarah Shahi – Fairly Legal	**Demi Lovato** – Sonny with a Chance; Victoria Justice – Victorious; Selena Gomez – Wizards of Waverly Place; Naya Rivera – Glee; Sofía Vergara – Modern Family
Favorite TV Actress – Supporting Role	
**Maria Canals-Barrera** – Wizards of Waverly Place; Constance Marie – Switched at Birth; Aubrey Plaza – Parks and Recreation; Sarah Ramos – Parenthood; Lauren Vélez – Dexter

=== Music ===
Favorite Male Music Artist	Favorite Female Music Artist
**Pitbull**; Taio Cruz; Enrique Iglesias; Bruno Mars; Ricky Martin	**Naya Rivera**; Christina Aguilera; Jennifer Lopez; Selena Gomez; Shakira
