= KFC advertising =

KFC has been an extensive advertiser since the establishment of the first franchise in 1952.

Founder Colonel Sanders initially developed his "Colonel" persona as a low-cost marketing tool. The Colonel's image is still used extensively in the chain's advertising.

The chain is well known for the "finger lickin' good" slogan, which originated in 1956.

== Colonel Sanders ==
Colonel Sanders was a key component of KFC advertising until his death in 1980. He made several appearances in various B movies and television programs of the period, such as What's My Line? and I've Got a Secret. Jack Massey described him as "the greatest PR man I have ever known". KFC franchisee and Wendy's founder Dave Thomas credited Sanders' appeal to the fact that he "stood for values that people understood and liked".

Since his death Sanders has remained a key symbol of the company; an "international symbol of hospitality".

In 1994, KFC hired actor Henderson Forsythe to portray the Colonel in a television campaign entitled "The Colonel's Way". The $18.4 million campaign from Young & Rubicam used black and white visuals. The campaign was deemed unsuccessful and was ended.

From May 1998, an animated version of the Colonel, "boisterously" voiced by Randy Quaid and animated by Klasky-Csupo of Rugrats fame in collaboration with Wang Film Productions, was used for television advertisements. KFC chief concept officer Jeff Moody said they "provide a fresh way to communicate our relevance for today's consumers". The animated Colonel was dropped in 2001 in the US, and in 2002 in the UK. In 2012, a UK advertisement entitled "4000 cooks" featured an actor made up to resemble Sanders.

Beginning in May 2015, Darrell Hammond began playing a live-action Colonel Sanders in KFC commercials. Three months later, KFC launched a new campaign with comedian Norm Macdonald portraying Sanders; the first ad of the campaign makes direct reference to the Hammond campaign, with a brief piece of footage of Hammond followed by Macdonald's Colonel declaring his predecessor an impostor. Jim Gaffigan then began playing Sanders in February 2016, with his first ads stating that Macdonald's Colonel was another impostor. George Hamilton began appearing as "The Extra Crispy Colonel" in July 2016, with no transition referencing Gaffigan's Colonel. Later, in September 2016, Rob Riggle began appearing as a new Colonel Sanders, the coach of the fictitious "Kentucky Buckets" football team, again with no transition. In October 2016, Vincent Kartheiser appeared in another campaign as the Nashville Colonel, a younger 'Heartthrob' take on the character.

In January 2017, Billy Zane began appearing as a Gold Colonel Sanders to promote a new Georgia Gold flavor chicken. In April 2017, KFC released a campaign featuring Rob Lowe as astronaut Colonel Sanders giving a JFK speech spoof/homage about launching the Zinger chicken sandwich into space. This commercial also featured Wink Martindale. Lowe released a statement saying that when he was a child, his grandfather took him to meet Harland Sanders. In 2018, a "Value Colonel" was introduced, portrayed by Christopher Boyer, an intentionally obscure background character actor who was among those who auditioned for the part in 2015; Boyer's first commercial also featured a cameo from Wayne Knight as another celebrity Colonel. In January 2018, country music singer Reba McEntire was selected to be KFC's first female Colonel Sanders. In August 2018, former Seinfeld star Jason Alexander was named the new Colonel Sanders. Alexander had previously appeared in commercials for KFC in the early 2000s. Actor Craig Fleming portrays the Colonel in the 2018 ad featuring Mrs. Butterworth. In 2019, actor Peter Weller reprised his role of RoboCop in the guise of Colonel Sanders.

KFC CMO Kevin Hochman told PRWeek, "The plan was always to rotate colonels. We always thought of it like James Bond. The actor that dons the white suit brings something of his own to the actual character." Although the rotating "Real Colonel Sanders" campaigns have generated mixed reviews, analysts and company executives credit it with helping to boost sales. In late 2017, KFC introduced the "Value Colonel" portrayed by a lesser-known actor, Christopher Boyer, to advertise value meals. Boyer's portrayal of the Colonel makes a point to note that because he is not famous, he can advertise cheaply, even telling a Colonel Sanders suited Wayne Knight in one commercial, "Ah, ah, ah, no celebrities!"

In 2019, a KFC themed dating sim featuring Colonel Sanders, titled I Love You, Colonel Sanders! A Finger Lickin' Good Dating Simulator was released on September 24. The game received a 50% on Metacritic, and Polygon writer Nicole Carpenter gave it a negative review, citing its short playtime compared to advertised length and seeming mockery of the dating sim genre.

The ubiquity of Sanders has not prevented KFC from introducing a mascot aimed at children. "Chicky", a young animated chicken, was first introduced in Thailand in the 1990s, and has since been rolled out across a number of markets worldwide, mostly in Asia and South America.

== Slogans ==
Early official slogans included "North America's Hospitality Dish" (1956–1966) and "We fix Sunday dinner seven nights a week" from 1957 until 1968. The two slogans were phased out in order to concentrate on the "finger lickin' good" slogan.

The "finger lickin' good" slogan was trademarked in 1956. After a local KFC television advertisement had featured Arizona franchisee Dave Harman licking his fingers in the background, a viewer phoned the station to complain. The main actor in the advertisement, a KFC manager named Ken Harbough, upon hearing of this, responded: "Well, it's finger lickin' good." The phrase was adopted nationally by the company by the 1960s, and went on to become one of the best-known slogans of the twentieth century. The trademark expired in the US in 2006, and was replaced in that market with "Follow your taste" until 2010. In 2011, the "finger lickin' good" slogan was dropped in favor of "So good", to be rolled out worldwide. A Yum! executive said that the new slogan was more holistic, applying to staff and service, as well as food. Other slogans included "It's America's Country-Good Meal" and "It's Nice to Feel So Good about a Meal" (late 1970s), "We Do Chicken Right" (1980s) and "Everybody needs a little KFC" (mid 1990s).

"Nobody does chicken like KFC" was first introduced by KFC Australia in 1998, and has continued to be used by the company in some markets.

In 2015, along with a revamp of their U.S. advertising, KFC returned to using "Finger Lickin' Good". As of April 2016, KFC began using the slogan "Colonel Quality, Guaranteed."

In 2020, during the COVID-19 pandemic, KFC suspended use of the slogan "It's Finger Lickin' Good" out of safety concerns.

The secret recipe is regularly identified with the phrase "eleven herbs and spices," the amount and identification of which remain a trade secret.

== Logos ==
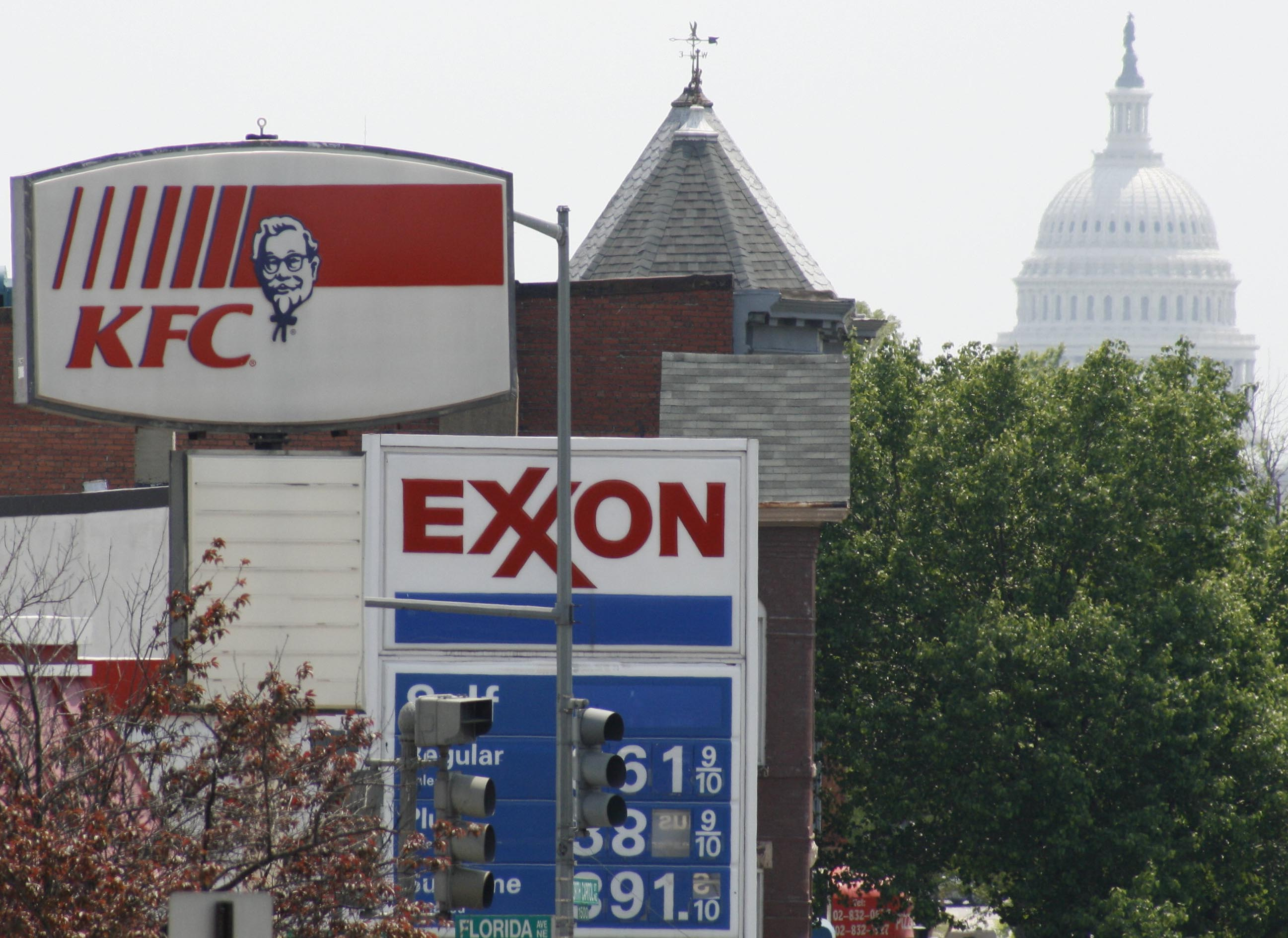
A typical KFC logo on a sign in front of a restaurant in Washington, D.C.

The first KFC logo was introduced in 1952 and featured a "Kentucky Fried Chicken" typeface and a logo of the Colonel. It was designed by the Lippincott & Margulies corporate identity agency. Lippincott & Margulies were hired to redesign it in 1978, and used a similar typeface and a slightly different Sanders logo. The "KFC" acronym logo was designed by Schechter & Luth of New York and was introduced in 1991, and the Colonel's face logo was switched from brown to blue ink.

Landor redesigned the logo in 1997, with a new image of the Colonel. The new Colonel image was more thinly lined, less cartoonish and a more realistic representation of Sanders. In 2007, the Colonel logo was updated by Tesser of San Francisco, replacing his white suit with an apron, bolder colors and a better defined visage. According to Gregg Dedrick, president of KFC's US division, the change, "communicates to customers the realness of Colonel Sanders and the fact that he was a chef".

== Television ==
=== United States ===
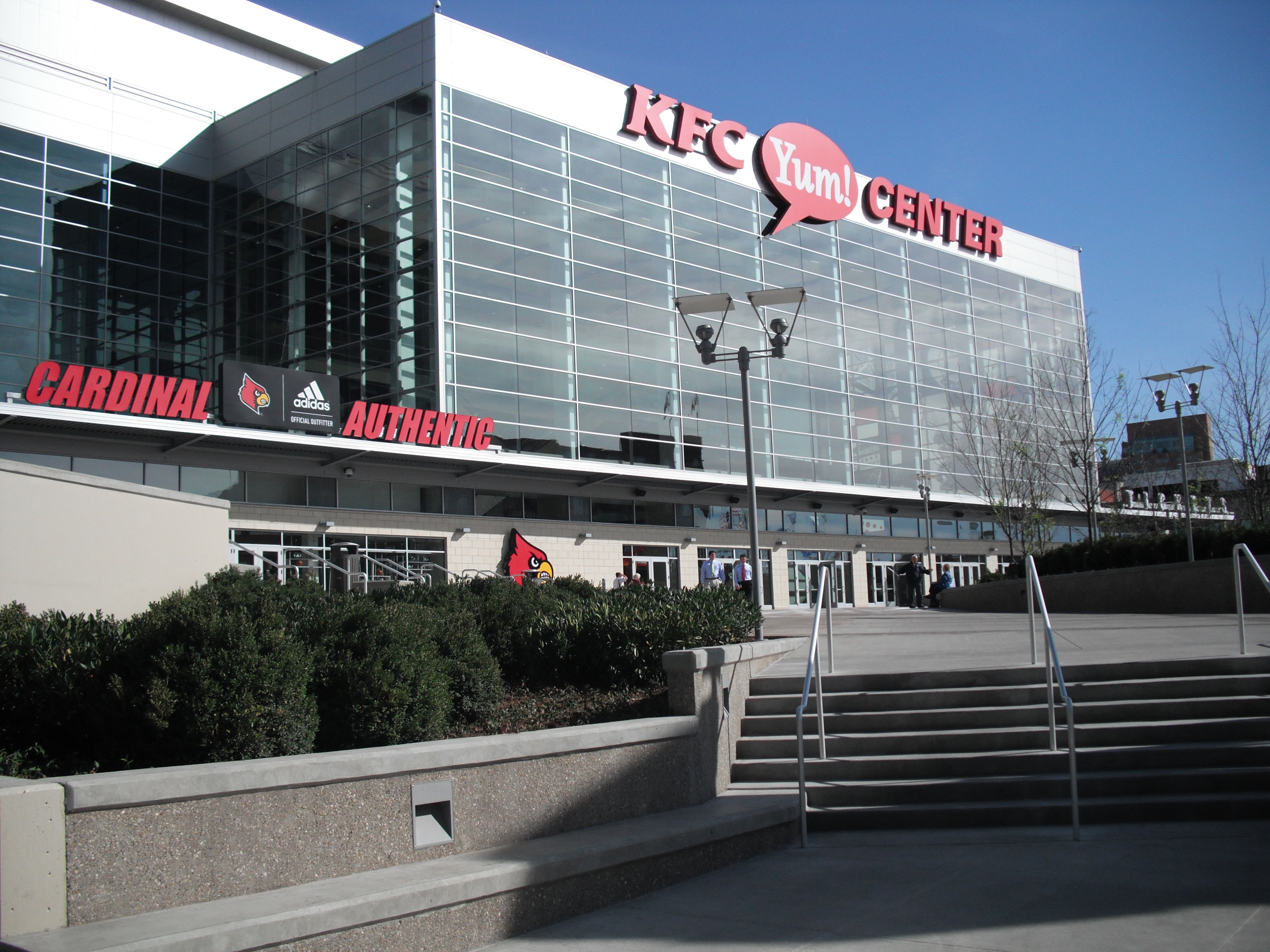
KFC Yum! Center in Louisville, Kentucky

KFC began to advertise nationwide from 1966, with a US television budget of US$4 million. In order to fund nationwide advertising campaigns, the Kentucky Fried Chicken Advertising Co-op was established, giving franchisees 10 votes and the company three when deciding on budgets and campaigns. In 1968, the budget was increased to US$9 million (around US$60 million in 2013).

In 1969, KFC hired its first national advertising agency, Leo Burnett. John Hughes, later to become a filmmaker, worked as a copywriter on the account. A notable Burnett campaign in 1972 was the "Get a bucket of chicken, have a barrel of fun" jingle, performed by Barry Manilow.

By 1976 KFC was one of the largest advertisers in the US. Young & Rubicam (Y&R) was KFC's agency of record in the US from 1976 until December 2000. The tagline from 1976 to 1981 was: "It's nice to feel so good about a meal". It was chosen because KFC had identified consumer guilt as its core marketing obstacle. Meanwhile, KFC hired the Mingo-Jones agency to target African American audiences. Mingo-Jones coined the "We do chicken right" slogan, which was later adopted across the whole chain from 1981 until 1991. From 1991 to 1994, the television campaign focused on the fictional town of Lake Edna. When he took over the CEO role at KFC, David C. Novak ended the campaign, which he derided as "hokey". The campaign was replaced by one with the tagline, "Everybody needs a little KFC", which Novak credited with helping to boost sales at the company.

BBDO took over the KFC US account in December 2000. Its first campaign, featuring Jason Alexander (who would later play Colonel Sanders for KFC ads in 2018), debuted on television in July 2001. It ran until May 2003 with the tagline, "There's fast food. Then there's KFC." In September 2003, BBDO was replaced by Foote, Cone & Belding. Its first campaign aired in November, but was pulled after less than a month following complaints from the National Advertising Division and the Center for Science in the Public Interest that it advertised the health benefits of eating fried chicken.

=== International ===
In 1994, Ogilvy & Mather became KFC's international agency of record. From 1997 to 1999, Ogilvy & Mather used celebrities such as Ivana Trump, Tara Palmer-Tomkinson and Ulrika Jonsson to endorse KFC products in television advertisements in the UK. After this campaign, the agency simply adapted Y&R's American campaigns, such as the animated Colonel, for a British audience. In late 2002, BBH was appointed KFC's UK agency. In 2003, the "Soul Food" campaign was launched, aiming to capture the young urban market with 1960s and 70s African-American music. By 2005, this was believed to have been a failure, and KFC UK's marketing director left the company amid speculation that the US head office was unhappy with the campaign. In 2012, it was determined that a 2005 advert in the Soul Food campaign, featuring people talking and singing with their mouths full, had been the most complained-about advert in the fifty-year history of the Advertising Standards Authority. The complaints were not upheld at the time. Marketing subsequently moved towards a more family-orientated line.

In 2017, Mother London began producing ads for KFC UK. One campaign included a dancing chicken and rap music.

Moksh Chopra, Director Marketing, KFC India announced that theatre and film actor Denzil Smith would be the first Indian Colonel, kicking off different campaigns from KFC Land to Zinger.

== 2018 print ad ==
During a February 2018 food shortage that caused some restaurants to close and others to have limited selection, Mother London was given the job of helping KFC with its public relations. A print ad rearranged the KFC letters to spell FCK; the ad won awards at Cannes and elsewhere.

== Promotional tie-ins and corporate sponsorships ==
In 2013, WPP's BrandZ valued the brand at US$10 billion.

Between November 1998 and January 2000, KFC US teamed with Nintendo, Game Freak and 4Kids Entertainment in a Pokémon tie-in. Pokémon themed promotional days were held, Pokémon Beanie Babies were sold, and Pokémon toys were given away free with children's meals. In 1999, PepsiCo signed a $2 billion agreement with Lucasfilm in order to market Star Wars themed meals in its KFC and Pizza Hut chains.

Since 2010, KFC has sponsored the KFC Yum! Center in Louisville. In Australia, KFC has sponsored the Big Bash League Twenty20 cricket tournament and Twenty20 international matches since 2003.

In December 2018, KFC, in partnership with Enviro-Log, created a firelog that smells like fried chicken with KFC's 11 herbs and spices. The logs sold out online within hours of their debut.

KFC teamed up with Crocs in 2020 to create "KFC Crocs," a collaborative line of shoes presented tongue-in-cheek as haute couture. The shoes made their debut at Christian Cowan's presentation in the 2020 New York Fashion Week, where they were modeled by South Korean artist MLMA. MLMA also starred in a commercial for the shoes, which were distributed to celebrities like Kim Kardashian before being made available for sale to the general public.

In December 2020, KFC UK and Ireland in partnership with Cooler Master announced the "KFConsole", which would be a gaming console "capable of running games at top-level specs, all on top of keeping your meal warm for you to enjoy during your gaming experience". The console would include a patented "Chicken Chamber", which utilizes the heat and airflow system of the console to heat fried chicken. No further announcement has been made regarding a product release.

=== DC comics one-shots ===
Between 2015 and 2017, KFC and DC Comics partnered to publish three one-shot comic books: The Colonel of Two Worlds, The Colonel Corps, and Across the Universe, each featuring KFC mascot Colonel Sanders working with popular DC superheroes such as Green Lantern and the Flash. Originally exclusively available at various comic cons, they were later made available for free download by DC.

In The Colonel of Two Worlds, a new, evil version of Colonel Sanders, Colonel Sunder from Earth-3, teams up with Mirror Master and Captain Cold to tarnish the reputation of the original Sanders, and he and the Flash set out to set things right. In Colonel Corps, Colonel Sunder, the Anti-Colonel, with the aid of Colonel Grodd (a Colonel version of Gorilla Grodd) returns to the Multiverse, who steals the secret recipe to KFC's chicken from the minds of various versions of the Colonel from across the Multiverse. Sanders allies with ten other versions of himself from other realities to defeat the duo. In Across the Universe, the Colonel goes cosmic in a star-spanning quest to bring crunchy, spicy satisfaction to a hungry universe, only to face a "thieving varmint" who steals his space-bound Zinger chicken sandwiches that he and Green Lantern must defeat.

=== NASCAR sponsorships ===
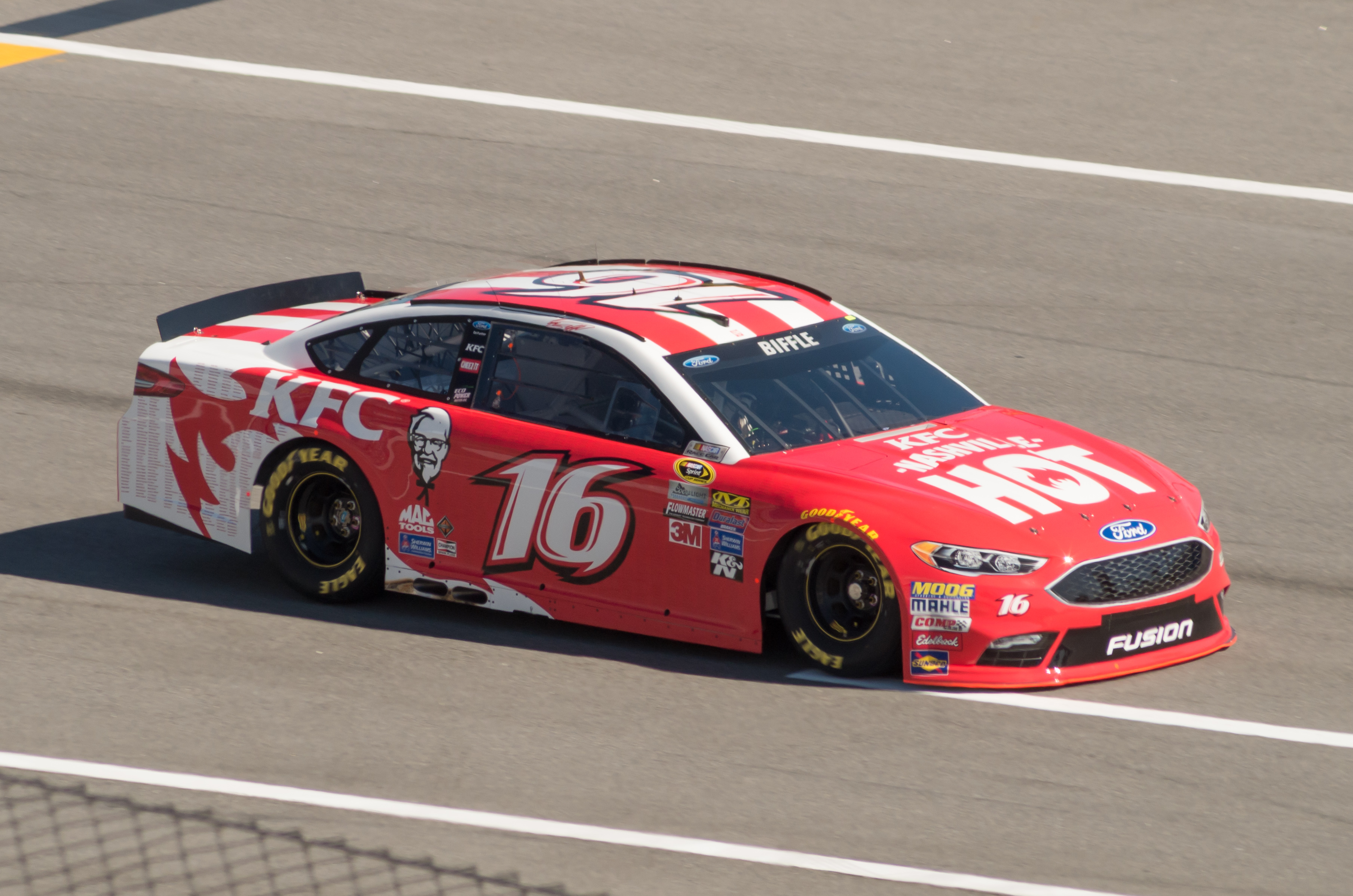
Greg Biffle's No. 16 KFC-sponsored car in 2016

KFC has marketed with various NASCAR teams, sponsoring several cars on a limited basis throughout the years.

KFC's first appearance in NASCAR was in the NASCAR Cup Series in 1972, sponsoring Buddy Arrington's No. 67 car beginning with the Daytona 500. During the 1980s, KFC franchisee Rick Jeffrey raced in NASCAR with such sponsorship.

In 1997, to promote its newly introduced Chicken Twister, KFC created "Team Twister" to sponsor drivers across NASCAR's three national series (Cup, Busch, Truck) during the sport's race weekend at Indianapolis Motor Speedway and Indianapolis Raceway Park. Rich Bickle of Darrell Waltrip Motorsports was Team Twister's Cup driver at Indianapolis, while Kenny Irwin Jr. (Liberty Racing) and Mike Skinner (Great Dane Racing) represented KFC in the Busch and Truck Series at IRP, respectively. However, Irwin failed to qualify for his race and Rick Fuller raced with the KFC sponsorship instead. Skinner and Bickle had previously driven KFC cars in the Busch Series in 1994 while employed by Gene Petty, as did David Hyder. Other KFC Busch Series one-off sponsorships during the decade included Ed Berrier in 1994 at Charlotte Motor Speedway and Tim Fedewa in 1995 at Bristol Motor Speedway.

Several years later in 2004, KFC sponsored Busch team Chance 2 Motorsports' No. 8 for some races with Martin Truex Jr. and a race at Daytona International Speedway with Dale Earnhardt Jr.

KFC did not return to NASCAR until 2014, serving as a sponsor for Cup team Front Row Motorsports that year and in 2015. KFC was on the No. 34 of David Ragan both years, and on the No. 35 of Cole Whitt in 2015 only. In 2016, KFC moved to Roush Fenway Racing to sponsor the No. 16 of Greg Biffle, again for a limited number of races.
