= Psyop (disambiguation) =

Psyop may refer to:

- Psychological warfare, information operations to assist military objectives
  - Psychological operations (United States), psychological operations within United States military and intelligence agencies
- Psi-Ops: The Mindgate Conspiracy, a 2004 video game
- Psyop (company), a commercial production company
