= Dream Daddy: A Dad Dating Simulator =

2017 visual novel video game

- Developer: Game Grumps
- Publisher: Game Grumps
- Director: Tyler J. Hutchison
- Producers: Arin Hanson; Brent Lilley
- Designers: Tyler J. Hutchinson; Jory Griffis; Greg Batha; Eric Itomuna; Alejandro Quan-Madrid (Minigames); XPTND (Minigames)
- Writers: Vernon Shaw; Leighton Gray
- Composers: Jesse Cale; Baths (theme song)
- Engine: Unity
- Platforms: Microsoft Windows, macOS, Linux, PlayStation 4, Nintendo Switch, Android, iOS
- Release: Microsoft Windows, macOS; July 20, 2017; Linux; September 22, 2017; PlayStation 4; October 30, 2018; Nintendo Switch, Android, iOS; July 2, 2019
- Genre: Visual novel
- Mode: Single-player

Dream Daddy: A Dad Dating Simulator is a visual novel video game released on July 20, 2017 for Microsoft Windows and macOS, and on September 22, 2017 for Linux. The game was developed and published by Game Grumps and written by Vernon Shaw and Leighton Gray. The expanded Dadrector's Cut was released for the PlayStation 4, along with an update for the PC version, on October 30, 2018. It was released on Nintendo Switch on July 2, 2019.

== Gameplay ==
Dream Daddy is an interactive visual novel where the player can choose between seven different single fathers they can date. Included are mini-games to complete, multiple endings and voice acting by members of the show Game Grumps. The player is able to customize the appearance of their player character.

== Plot ==
The game follows a widowed father who has just moved to a new house in Maple Bay with his teenaged daughter, Amanda. On the cul-de-sac where he lives, most of the fathers are single, and the player has the option of romancing them. The available romance options are:

- Mat Sella, an easygoing musician and coffee shop owner.
- Craig Cahn, a fitness fanatic and the protagonist's former college roommate.
- Hugo Vega, an avid bookworm and Amanda's high school English teacher.
- Brian Harding, a friendly but highly competitive man who often brags about his daughter's accomplishments.
- Damien Bloodmarch, a goth fascinated with Victorian-era fashions and aesthetics.
- Robert Small, a rugged, mysterious and hard-drinking loner.
- Joseph Christiansen, the youth minister at the local church and the only married dad.

== Development ==
Vernon Shaw, the co-creator and co-writer for Dream Daddy, met the Game Grumps while he was working as a talent manager for Maker Studios. Maker Studios was the Game Grumps' channel network from June 2013 to January 2016. The idea for the game came from a joke that Vernon and co-creator Leighton Gray made about dads visiting Disneyland, and the inspiration to make a dad dating simulator came from the pigeon-dating visual novel, Hatoful Boyfriend. The development of Dream Daddy started after the proposal of the game by Shaw to Arin Hanson, to which Hanson immediately approved. Tyler Hutchinson, the director, and Jory Griffis, the narrative designer, were hired in fall of 2016. The original plan for the game was to have development be done in around 9 months in time for a Father's Day 2017 release, but this proved to be too difficult. Dream Daddy was announced on June 18, 2017, with a 45-second-long teaser trailer uploaded on the Game Grumps' alternate channel, GrumpOut. On July 14, 2017, it was announced that the game's release would be delayed due to the discovery of some last-minute bugs, and would miss its original release date of July 13, 2017. It was given a new date of July 19, 2017, only to be delayed again. It finally came out on July 20, 2017. A Dadrector's Cut of the game, featuring additional sidequests and minigames, was released on the PlayStation 4 and launched as a free update to the PC version on October 30, 2018.

Initially, Hutchinson and Griffis thought the game was too linear and told Vernon and Leighton to look to the 1994 game Tokimeki Memorial for inspiration on system-driven dating sims. After systems-based gameplay was installed, the player did not just play for the dads' affection but play to a point where they could be "cool" or "erudite" enough for the dads' affection. Narrative paths became more character-driven and logic-based as development went on. The word count for the game would be around 133,000 when development was eventually over.

A philosophy used by Vernon Shaw while developing the game was "sincerity wrapped in cynicism", meaning the player would play the game because of the intrigue about gay dads but walk away with life lessons about fatherhood and relationships. Griffis recalls the switch from the game being about dads having sex to being about relationships came towards the end of development when character arcs had been fully established. The lack of references by characters to their sexual orientation came from the developers feeling that most media dealing with queer people was about societal issues and not about the relationships themselves. Instead, the game deals with issues like social anxiety and toxic masculinity.

== Reception ==
Reception

Aggregate score
Aggregator	Score
Metacritic	72/100

Review scores
Publication	Score
Game Informer	7.5/10
GameStar	76/100
PC Gamer (US)	70/100
Polygon	8/10
Bleeding Cool	9/10
Wired (UK)	7/10

Critical response to the game was "mixed or average", according to the review aggregator Metacritic. The game's writing was praised by publications, such as Wired UK and PC Gamer. Critics noted that the game does a good job at transitioning from comedic to serious segments, with Simone de Rochefort of Polygon saying "While it's remarkable and perhaps surprising that Dream Daddy capably handles serious plots—especially if all you've seen is the game's marketing—no one should be shocked that it's also damn funny."

The representation of LGBT people in the game was met with generally positive reception. Matt Kamen of Wired UK praised that the game did not use gay stereotypes. Elise Favis of Game Informer said on the game not referencing the characters' identities, "Datable characters don't ever speak of sexual identities, which can feel strange at times, but it is also appropriate; since Dream Daddy is about fulfilling fantasies rather than mirroring reality, I got the sense that this world is removed from those social issues." Hannah Dwan of PC Gamer said the game should have included commentary on the difficulty of queer people finding relationships in society. The game's system of determining what gender identity and sexual orientation the player character has was praised by Wired UK.

In Game Studies, Braidon Schaufert claimed that the game's significant online fandom further normalized the slang term Daddy to refer to an attractive male character, person, or celebrity.

=== Accolades ===
The game was nominated for "Best Visual Novel" in PC Gamer's 2017 Game of the Year Awards, and for "Best Adventure Game" in IGN's Best of 2017 Awards. It was a runner-up each for "Best New Character" (Damien Bloodmarch), "Best Cast of Characters", and "Game of the Year" in Giant Bomb's 2017 Game of the Year Awards. It won the award for "Biggest Surprise" in Game Informer's 2017 Adventure Game of the Year Awards.

Year	Award	Category	Result	Ref
2017	Golden Joystick Awards	Best Indie Game	Nominated	
2017	Golden Joystick Awards	PC Game of the Year	Nominated	
2017	Golden Joystick Awards	Breakthrough Award (Game Grumps)	Nominated	
2018	National Academy of Video Game Trade Reviewers Awards	Game, Special Class	Nominated	
2018	SXSW Gaming Awards	Trending Game of the Year	Nominated	

== See also ==
- Raptor Boyfriend
