= Cooler Master =

Taiwanese computer hardware company

Cooler Master Co., Ltd.
- Native name: 訊凱國際股份有限公司
- Type: Private
- Industry: Computer hardware
- Founded: 1992; 34 years ago
- Headquarters: Taipei, Taiwan
- Products: Computer cases Power supplies Computer coolers Computer peripherals Computer monitors Gaming chairs
- Website: coolermaster.com

Cooler Master Co., Ltd. (Chinese: 訊凱國際股份有限公司; pinyin: Xùnkǎi Guójì Gǔfèn Yǒuxiàn Gōngsī) is a computer hardware manufacturer based in Taipei, Taiwan. Founded in 1992, the company produces computer cases, power supplies, air and liquid CPU coolers, laptop cooling pads, and computer peripherals. The company is an original equipment manufacturer of cooling devices for other manufacturers, including Nvidia (VGA coolers), AMD (CPU and VGA coolers), and EVGA (motherboard heatsinks); Cooler Master Technology Inc. also markets products directly to consumers under the Cooler Master brand (酷碼; Kùmǎ). The company has sponsored major esports events. Some of Cooler Master's products have won awards including the iF product design award.

== Facilities ==
The company headquarters of Cooler Master is located in Neihu District, Taipei City, Taiwan and has a manufacturing facility in Huizhou, China. To support international operations, the company also has branch offices in various continents, including the United States (Fremont, California and Chino, California), the Netherlands (Eindhoven), Italy (Milan), France (Paris), Germany (Augsburg), Russia (Moscow), and Brazil (São Paulo).

== Products ==
The company in March 2020 continues to release its own gaming headsets, with products like the MH670 headphones allowing customization through the Cooler Master configuration app, named Portal. It also makes esports mice.

One of its main current products is the Hyper 212 Evo CPU cooler, which PCWorld says is "arguably the most popular CPU air cooler for the budget-minded crowd wanting to upgrade from the stock options." The company also makes other air coolers, liquid coolers, PC cases, fans, and power supplies.

In January 2020, the company changed its applicator style to a new wide-tipped applicator, with Cooler Master stating that it was to alarm fewer parents about the older syringe shape.

The KFConsole, a home video game console launched in December 2020, is part of a partnership between Cooler Master and KFC.

In 2012 the company included a free "Captain Cooler Master" figure with some purchases to celebrate its 20th anniversary.

=== CM Storm ===
CM Storm is a subsidiary brand created in 2008. Products are developed using research collected from partnerships with gaming organizations in eSports including Mousesports and Frag Dominant. In September 2009, CM Storm launched the Sentinel Advanced mouse with a programmable organic light-emitting diode display. In January 2012, CM Storm launched the QuickFire Ultimate keyboard. In January 2013, CM Storm launched the Sirus S gaming headset featuring an inline remote with volume control and microphone mute button. As of 2018, Cooler Master no longer sells products under the CM Storm brand.

In June 2024, Cooler Master launched its 57-inch GP57ZS gaming monitor featuring DUHD resolution, mini LED, and VRR technology.

== See also ==
- List of companies of Taiwan
- List of computer hardware manufacturers
- Noctua (company)
