= A Recipe for Seduction =

2020 short film

- Written by: Eric Eckelman; Armand Prisco; Natalie Prisco
- Directed by: Eric Eckelman; Armand Prisco; Natalie Prisco
- Starring: Mario Lopez; Justene Alpert; Tessa Munro; Chad Doreck
- Composer: Jay Lifton
- Country of origin: United States

Production
- Producer: Josh Rothfeld
- Cinematography: Don Davis
- Editor: Angela Cheng
- Running time: 15 minutes
- Production companies: JEAN; Kentucky Fried Chicken

Original release
- Network: Lifetime
- Release: December 13, 2020

A Recipe for Seduction is a short romance film (branded as a "mini-movie") sponsored by KFC and produced by the Lifetime Channel, starring Mario Lopez as Colonel Sanders. The movie premiered on December 13, 2020. It tells the story of a young heiress who struggles to choose between a wealthy suitor chosen by her mother, and the new house chef Harland Sanders.

== Plot ==
At a dinner party featuring fried chicken at the lavish Mancera house, Billy Garibaldi III proposes to Jessica Mancera. She is taken aback and says she “will think about it", angering her mother Bunny.

The next day, Bunny confronts Jessica, explaining that her marrying Billy is the only way to solve the family's financial woes. They are interrupted by their new live-in chef, a fictionalized Harland Sanders. Harland and Jessica are immediately smitten with each other. Jessica later offers Harland a tour of the grounds, and they quickly share their life stories. Harland mentions a secret fried chicken recipe that he envisions changing the world, when an angry Billy interrupts and makes a thinly veiled threat towards Jessica.

Later, Jessica's friend Lee prepares for a date at a country club while Jessica reveals that she is falling in love with Harland by phone. While Jessica is showering, it is revealed that Bunny was listening in on the phone conversation. Bunny, posing as Jessica, texts Billy on Jessica's phone, and tells him to meet her at a country club, which is coincidentally the same club Lee is on a date at. When they meet, Bunny tells Billy about Harland's secret recipe. Billy scoffs, and then it is revealed that Bunny and Billy had an affair and that they have feelings for one another. Lee sees the two meeting and tells Jessica to call her right away, but Jessica does not have her phone with her.

Later at the house, Billy searches furiously for Harland's secret recipe in the kitchen, finding it in Harland's bag. Harland walks in, and Billy offers Harland a $500,000 check to leave town and cut off contact with Jessica. Harland turns down the offer, but Billy reveals that he knows Harland's secret recipe. Billy lies to Harland, telling him that Jessica said yes to his proposal, resulting in Harland going off to talk to Jessica.

In another part of the house, Lee, looking for Jessica, confronts Bunny about her meeting with Billy. Before Lee can reach Jessica, Bunny knocks him out with a polo mallet.

Elsewhere, Harland talks to Jessica, upset that she supposedly chose to marry Billy and also that she revealed the existence of the secret recipe. He gives her Billy's check and wishes her the best. Jessica tells Harland that she never agreed to marry and confesses her love for him, and they kiss. Bunny sees them through a window, telling Billy over the phone that they have "a problem”.

The next day, Jessica tells Bunny that she is in love with Harland and is turning down Billy's engagement. Bunny tells her that Harland left in the middle of the night, which is revealed to not be true. Jessica checks the kitchen and finds his belongings have disappeared. While walking forlornly around the grounds, Jessica hears muffled screaming coming from a storage room. Inside she finds Harland, gagged and tied to a chair. As she approaches, Billy steps out of the shadows brandishing a knife, revealing that he is planning to kill Harland. Bunny rushes in, but to Jessica's horror, she reveals she is a part of the scheme and tells Billy to kill Harland at once. Harland headbutts Billy, and while Jessica and Bunny look on in shock, Lee, who has been hiding in the room, knocks Billy out. Bunny is consumed with rage and tries to attack Harland, but she is pushed aside and knocked out by Jessica.

One year later, Jessica and Harland are being wed with Lee. Meanwhile, Bunny appears to be confined to a "health and wellness center". She is told she has a visitor by a worker. It is Billy, who says he has found "them”, referring to Harland and Jessica. He then eats a piece of fried chicken, ending the film on a cliffhanger.

== Cast ==
- Mario Lopez as Harland Sanders
- Justene Alpert as Jessica Mancera
- Tessa Munro as Bunny Mancera
- Chad Doreck as Billy Garibaldi III
- Martin Morrow as Lee
- Emily Lemos as "Health and Wellness Center" Nurse

== Production ==
The film was conceptualized in 2018. It was filmed in October 2020. Filming was delayed due to the COVID-19 pandemic.

The trailer was released on December 7, 2020. The film is Lifetime's first custom branded content production.

== Reception ==
The film has a 70% score on Rotten Tomatoes indicating generally positive reviews. Many critics noted the juxtaposition between the film's bizarre premise and its familiar use of tropes associated with Hallmark movies.

Christine D'Zurilla of the Los Angeles Times gave a more favorable review, calling it "a tongue-in-cheek take on the Lifetime romance genre" and "aimed at women who love men who love chicken". Liz Kocan of Decider praised the film's storytelling and called it "comfort food."

Alexandra Del Rosario of Deadline Hollywood said that the film had "an unusual casting for an even odder title." Salon was more critical, calling it "simply another example of how corporate advertising continues to overtly commandeer everyday spaces like film and social media."

== See also ==
- I Love You, Colonel Sanders!, a dating sim video game featuring Colonel Sanders
