= Hatoful Boyfriend: Holiday Star =

2011 video game

- Logo of Hatoful Boyfriend: Holiday Star
- Developer(s): PigeoNation Inc.; Mediatonic (remake)
- Publisher(s): MIST[PSI]PRESS; Devolver Digital (remake)
- Director(s): Hato Moa; Jeff Tanton (remake)
- Producer(s): Hato Moa; Anna Morris (remake); Luke Borrett (remake)
- Programmer(s): Hato Moa; Sherif Aziz (remake); Lindsay Cox (remake)
- Artist(s): Hato Moa; Gregor Kari (remake); Adam Walker (remake); Celine Choo (remake); Marija Tiurina (remake)
- Writer(s): Hato Moa
- Engine: Famous Writer; Unity (remake)
- Platform(s): Microsoft Windows, OS X, Linux, PlayStation 4, PlayStation Vita
- Release: Microsoft Windows: JP: 29 December 2011; WW: 25 December 2012; Remake: Windows, OS X, Linux: WW: 15 December 2015; Remake: PS4, PS Vita: WW: 22 December 2015
- Genre(s): Nakige, dating sim, otome
- Mode(s): Single-player

Hatoful Boyfriend: Holiday Star (Japanese: はーとふる彼氏 HolidayStar, Hepburn: Hātofuru kareshi HolidayStar), is a visual novel released in Japan on 29 December 2011, with an official English patch being released a year later on Christmas Day. The game is an episodic followup to Hatoful Boyfriend set around the holiday season and takes place in a separate universe from the first game, in which the events of Bad Boys Love do not occur. The sequel, developed largely alongside the first game, makes reference to and explores several unresolved plot elements brought up in the first game's Bad Boys Love scenario that could not be fully addressed in its main narrative. Unlike the first game, Holiday Star is a mostly linear visual novel rather than an otome game, with more standalone scenarios and fewer branching plotlines. On 4 June 2015, it was announced that Mediatonic, the developer responsible for the 2014 remake of the original game, was also developing a remake of Holiday Star, again to be published by Devolver Digital. On 8 December 2015, it was announced that the remake of Hatoful Boyfriend: Holiday Star would be released on 15 December 2015 for Microsoft Windows, OS X and Linux, and on 22 December 2015 for PlayStation 4 and PlayStation Vita.

== Reception ==
The game's remake received an aggregate score of 54/100 for PC and 58/100 for PlayStation 4 from Metacritic, indicating "mixed or average reviews".
