= Chad Doreck =

American actor

- Born: Chad Joseph Doreck; November 19, 1978 (age 47); Orange County, California, U.S.
- Occupation: Actor
- Years active: 1986–present
- Website: chaddoreck.com

Chad Joseph Doreck (born November 19, 1978) is an American actor. He is the voice of Crackle for Rice Krispies, and Brad on the Nickelodeon series My Life as a Teenage Robot. In 2007, he was one of the final 12 contestants on Grease: You're the One That I Want!, a televised competition to choose the leads for the revival of Grease by Kathleen Marshall.

== Early life and education ==
Doreck is the son of Stephan Doreck and Catherine Doreck, and has a brother and sister. A native of Southern California, Doreck first became interested in singing as part of a church congregation. His career began with the help of his aunt.

He took his first acting role at the age of six in the music video for Oingo Boingo's "Weird Science". Doreck graduated from the Orange County School of the Arts, majoring in musical theatre. He briefly attended the University of Southern California to study film.

== Career ==
Doreck wrote and produced a CD, which was released in 2005. In 2007, he released a seven-song album called Awake and Sing. He has also modeled for Skechers, Vogue Italia, and Nordstrom, and has been the narrator on various programs televised on E!.

He played Matthew in the award-winning off-Broadway musical Altar Boyz from September 3, 2007, to March 30, 2008.

=== Grease: You're the One That I Want! ===
In 2007, Doreck was one of the final 12 contestants on Grease: You're the One That I Want!, a televised competition to choose the leads for the revival of Grease by Kathleen Marshall. On duet night (February 18, 2007), Doreck performed alongside fellow competitor Allie Schulz. The two were both praised for their chemistry and for their high-energy performance; judge David Ian referred to their performance as "theatrical Viagra".

On February 25, 2007, Doreck was in the bottom four along with Kevin Greene. The judges chose to save Doreck, putting him in the final four male contestants competing for the lead role of Danny Zuko. On March 11, 2007, Doreck was eliminated from the competition. His performances included:

1. "Hound Dog" by Elvis Presley
2. "Signed Sealed Delivered" by Stevie Wonder
3. "My Eyes Adored You" by Frankie Valli
4. "Ain't No Mountain High Enough" by Marvin Gaye and Tammi Terrell
5. "Don't Stop Me Now" by Queen

== Filmography ==
=== Film ===
Year	Title	Role	Notes
1991	All I Want for Christmas	Choir	
2007	Death Without Consent	Chris Carrington	
2007	A New Tomorrow	Agent	
2020	A Recipe for Seduction	Billy Garibaldi III	Short film

=== Television ===
Year	Title	Role	Notes
1986	The Judge	Christopher Bragg	Episode: "The Terrorist Tot"
1988	Newhart	Michael Harris Jr.	Episode: "A Midseason's Night Dream"
1989	Family Medical Center	Donny	Episode: "Family Medical Center"
1999	The Pretender	Duppy Demetrius	Episode: "Angel's Flight"
1999	Touched by an Angel	Teen Lonnie	Episode: "The Occupant"
2001	The Andy Dick Show	Pathos Papadopolis	Episode: "Faces of the Future"
2001	NYPD Blue	Tom Burris	Episode: "Puppy Love"
2002–2006	My Life as a Teenage Robot	Brad Carbuckle / Various characters	38 episodes
2002	State of Grace	Nick Hanson	Episode: "Driving Miss Ida"
2002	The Brady Bunch in the White House	Greg Brady	Television film
2003	Greetings from Tucson	Pizza Guy	Episode: "The Breakup"
2003	Rocket Power	Centola	Episode: "Reggie's Big (Beach) Break"
2004	NCIS	Leo	Episode: "One Shot, One Kill"
2004	All of Us	Male Nurse	Episode: "Thirty Candles"
2004	100 Reasons the 90s Ruled	Narrator	Television film
2005	Escape from Cluster Prime	Brad / Drab / French Citizen	Television film
2009	iCarly	Stewart Butler	Episode: "iMove Out"
2013	Untitled Murder Project 2.0	Landon	36 episodes
2015	The Slice	Max Rabinowitz	Television film
2018	General Hospital	Dr. Shawn	2 episodes
2020	Westworld	Shop Clerk	Episode: "The Mother of Exiles"
2020	Hollywood	John	2 episodes
2020	Saved by the Bell	Male Senior #1	Episode: "The Fabulous Birchwood Boys"
2021	Call Me Kat	Kyle	Episode: "Gym"
2023	Dead Ringers	Max	Episode: "One"
2025	1923	Bernard Anthony	Episode: "Only Gunshots to Guide Us"

=== Video games ===
Year	Title	Role	Notes
2004	Grand Theft Auto: San Andreas	Pedestrian / Radio Commercial	Voice
2009	Infamous	Male Pedestrian	Voice
2013	Disney Infinity	Art	Voice
2013	Grand Theft Auto V	The Local Population	Voice
2023	Marvel's Spider-Man 2	Cletus Kasady / "The Flame"	Voice and motion capture
