= Raptor Boyfriend =

2021 video game

- Developer: Rocket Adrift
- Publisher: Rocket Adrift
- Engine: Ren'Py
- Platforms: Windows, macOS, Linux
- Release: July 15, 2021
- Genres: Dating sim, visual novel
- Mode: Single-player

Raptor Boyfriend: A High School Romance is a dating sim, visual novel developed and published by Canadian studio, Rocket Adrift. The game's premise revolves around a teen girl who moves to a small secret community of cryptids, set in a fictional Ontario town called "Ladle". Like Hatoful Boyfriend and Dream Daddy, the game is an example of the sub-genre referred to as the "absurd dating sim".

Prior to its release, Raptor Boyfriend was listed as one of "21 indie video games to look forward to in 2021" on Polygon.

== Setting and gameplay ==
Raptor Boyfriend is a dating simulator and visual novel, where players are tasked with befriending cryptid teens, set in a fictional Canadian town in 1997. The player character chooses between dating both male and female cryptid love interests: a velociraptor, a Bigfoot, or a fae. The game has been described as a '90s teen drama, taking inspiration from 90s teen television and featuring an expressive art style, with bold lines and saturated colors. Raptor Boyfriend utilizes choice-based mechanics. Instead of dialogue options, the player must choose from a selection of directions to give the main character, Stella.

=== Characters ===
Raptor Boyfriend has one playable character, Stella Starosta, an introverted 17-year-old girl who moves back to her hometown for her senior year of high school. Players have three non-playable characters to romance throughout the game. This includes Robert, the titular velociraptor, a fae girl named Day, and Taylor, a Bigfoot. The characters of Robert and Taylor were named after Twilight actors, Robert Pattinson and Taylor Lautner.

== Development ==
While the game’s core concept takes from the Twilight series, Titus McNally of Rocket Adrift cited Doki Doki Literature Club and VA-11 Hall-A as inspirations in terms of visual novel game making.

Other story inspirations include My So-Called Life, the Life is Strange series, Night in the Woods, and Daria. The developers stated they hoped the game would be "reminiscent of a cartoon, in the way that the camera changes to who's talking and stuff like that. We wanted it to stand out a little bit from other visual novels in the design."

== Reception ==
Reception

Aggregate score
Aggregator	Score
OpenCritic	75/100; 40% recommend

The game received positive reviews upon release. Reece Rogers of Wired said the game's "tongue-in-cheek concept contrasts with a heartfelt narrative that tackles the complexities of growing up."
