= I Love You, Colonel Sanders! =

2019 dating sim game

I Love You, Colonel Sanders! A Finger Lickin' Good Dating Simulator
- Developer: Psyop
- Publisher: KFC
- Platforms: Windows; macOS
- Release: September 24, 2019
- Genres: Dating sim, visual novel, advergame

I Love You, Colonel Sanders! A Finger Lickin' Good Dating Simulator is a dating sim developed by Psyop. The video game was commissioned by the restaurant chain KFC and released for free on Steam on September 24, 2019. A parody of conventional dating sims, the primary objective of the player is to develop a romantic relationship with a fictionalized version of KFC's founder Colonel Sanders, portrayed as an attractive classmate at a cooking school.

The release of the game follows the reintroduction of Colonel Sanders into KFC's marketing campaigns in 2015, and is part of the company's strategy to make the Colonel a "part of pop culture", reimagining the historical figure for modern times. The game successfully received public attention due to the "can-you-believe-it" premise both before and after the game's release.

== Gameplay ==
Screenshot of the game showing the Van Van and Colonel Sanders characters

The game takes place over a three-day semester at the fictional University of Cooking School: Academy for Learning, where the player character is studying to become a chef. The player is presented with dialog choices that present opportunities to win Sanders' favor, as well as interactions with the other characters in the story, including the player's best friend Miriam, rivals Aeshleigh and Van Van the Man Man, Sprinkles/Professor Dog, and other students Pop, Clank the robot, and the nameless Student. A single playthrough takes about an hour, not including replaying different story line branches.

== Reception ==
Reception

Aggregate score
| Aggregator | Score |
|---|---|
| Metacritic | 50/100 |

I Love You, Colonel Sanders! received an overall lukewarm response from professional reviewers. In her review for Kotaku, Gita Jackson criticized the game's lack of emotional depth and over-reliance on "zaniness", comparing it unfavorably to other "goofy" dating sims like Hatoful Boyfriend and Nameless. Nicole Carpenter of Polygon reviewed the game in the context of KFC's apparent marketing strategy to distance the Colonel Sanders mascot from the actual person. She criticized it as "less of a game and more of a marketing stunt", with very little actual interactivity, and felt that it contributed to a trend of disrespect for the dating sim genre within the video game community. The art was praised by Jenny Zhang of Eater, comparing it favorably to Ouran High School Host Club. The review-aggregator website Metacritic gave the game an aggregate score of 50/100 based on critic reviews.

== See also ==
- A Recipe for Seduction, a short film also featuring a romance with Colonel Sanders
