= Mario Lopez: Saved by the Baby =

- Genre: Reality
- Created by: Cris Abrego; Mario Lopez
- Starring: Mario Lopez; Courtney Mazza
- Country of origin: United States
- Original language: English
- No. of seasons: 1
- No. of episodes: 10

Production
- Executive producers: Ben Samek; Cris Abrego; Jeff Olde; Jill Holmes; Julia Silverton; Kristen Kelly; Mario Lopez; Mark Schulman; Rabih Gholam
- Running time: 33 minutes
- Production companies: 3 Arts Entertainment; 51 Minds Entertainment; Via-Mar Productions

Original release
- Network: VH1
- Release: November 1, 2010 – January 3, 2011

Mario Lopez: Saved by the Baby is an American reality television series on VH1 that debuted on November 1, 2010. The series chronicles the life of Mario Lopez and his girlfriend (now wife) Courtney Mazza as they prepare for the arrival of their baby.

== Episodes ==
| No. | Title | Original release date | U.S. viewers (millions) |
|---|---|---|---|
| 1 | "Hasn't Hit Me Yet" | November 1, 2010 | 0.51 |
Mario Lopez and girlfriend Courtney Mazza are three months away from parenthood but the idea of fatherhood has not quite hit Mario yet. As he tries to juggle his crazy work schedule, he is also moving into a new house and, on top of that, he is dealing with a six-month pregnant woman. As if this balancing act was not enough pressure Courtney desperately wants to learn the sex of the baby in advance but Mario wants to keep it a surprise.
| 2 | "The Art of Compromise" | November 8, 2010 | 0.48 |
Mario is all about family so he takes a break from his crazy work schedule to bring his and Courtney's families on a vacation to Mexico. Mario lets everyone know that he is headstrong on not circumcising the baby if it is a boy. Courtney makes it a point to let Mario know that decisions regarding the baby must be 50/50. The couple work on finding a common ground when it comes to making any final baby-related decisions.
| 3 | "Mario's Juggling Act" | November 15, 2010 | 0.48 |
Mario is busy every minute of the day, but sometimes work can equal play. Mario brings Courtney and friends to the Del Mar racetrack where he must work for Extra, but he hopes to have some fun while he is there. His plan does not go over all that gracefully. Meanwhile Courtney wonders if Mario understands what it is physically like for her to be pregnant, so to get his attention, she molds her stomach and boobs for Mario to try on. It is all fun and games until Courtney has to take an emergency middle of the night trip to the hospital when she realizes that she is bleeding.
| 4 | "When Is Enough, Enough?" | November 22, 2010 | 0.49 |
After Courtney winds up in the hospital, the eager parents find out that they can no longer have sex until her condition is cleared up. The couple, especially Mario, is bummed out to hear the news but the two do not want to do anything to put the baby in danger. Mario suddenly gets pulled away from Courtney, during her big time of need, so that he can go to work. After a long talk with her sister about Mario's work priorities needing to shift, she decides she must lay down the law.
| 5 | "Courtney's Made the Switch" | November 29, 2010 | 0.55 |
Courtney has gone from being the poster child for the perfect pregnant woman with no ill effects to a hormonal wreck. Frustration sets in. Emotion sets in. Construction is still going on and she is trying to rest. Meanwhile, Mario cannot say or do anything right so he meets up with the guys to blow off steam.
| 6 | "What Kind of Dad Will I Be?" | December 6, 2010 | 0.44 |
Mario and Courtney head to the Dr. for another check up. They happily find out they can have sex again. This time the doctor introduces them to certain courses that new parents must take before the baby is born, including a breastfeeding class that he believes all fathers should attend. Mario attempts to stay during the class but gets called out for work with little remorse from his boss.
| 7 | "To Be There" | December 13, 2010 | 0.55 |
Once again Mario is torn away from a VERY pregnant Courtney for work purposes. It is the day before the Emmy's and tension around Extra is thick. Mario feels the pressure from Extra producers to perform a greater Emmy pre-show than ever before. Courtney makes Mario promise that he will attend the CPR class that evening and help her build a baby swing that comes in a million pieces.
| 8 | "Vegas Baby!" | December 20, 2010 | 0.52 |
Mario heads to Vegas with some of his boys to present at a big boxing event. Courtney is left behind but this time it is a week from her due date and she can pop at any moment. Mazza and her mom give Mario a big guilt trip but that does not stop him from enjoying one more boys night out. Mazza's worst fears come true when she does in fact go into labor while Mario is hundreds of miles away.
| 9 | "It's a..." | December 27, 2010 | N/A |
Mario, in Las Vegas, to announce for an HBO boxing fight. Meanwhile, Mazza in the hospital has just been told that she is going into early labor and the baby is coming out tonight. Mario and his eight friends have little time before they miss the last flight out of Vegas.
| 10 | "Bringing Home Baby Gia" | January 3, 2011 | N/A |
Mario and Courtney bring baby Gia home after a few days from her birth. It is a big moment for everyone, and the couple really feels, like they should, settled and homey. However, just when Mario starts to relax a bit, his boss at Extra drops a major bombshell — Extra might be moving to NY. Mario is left with a tough decision to uproot his family and move to New York or face possibly losing his job. It is a decision that Mazza and he must make together, but Mario may be too nervous to even tell Mazza about it.
