= Mario Lopez =

American actor (born 1973)

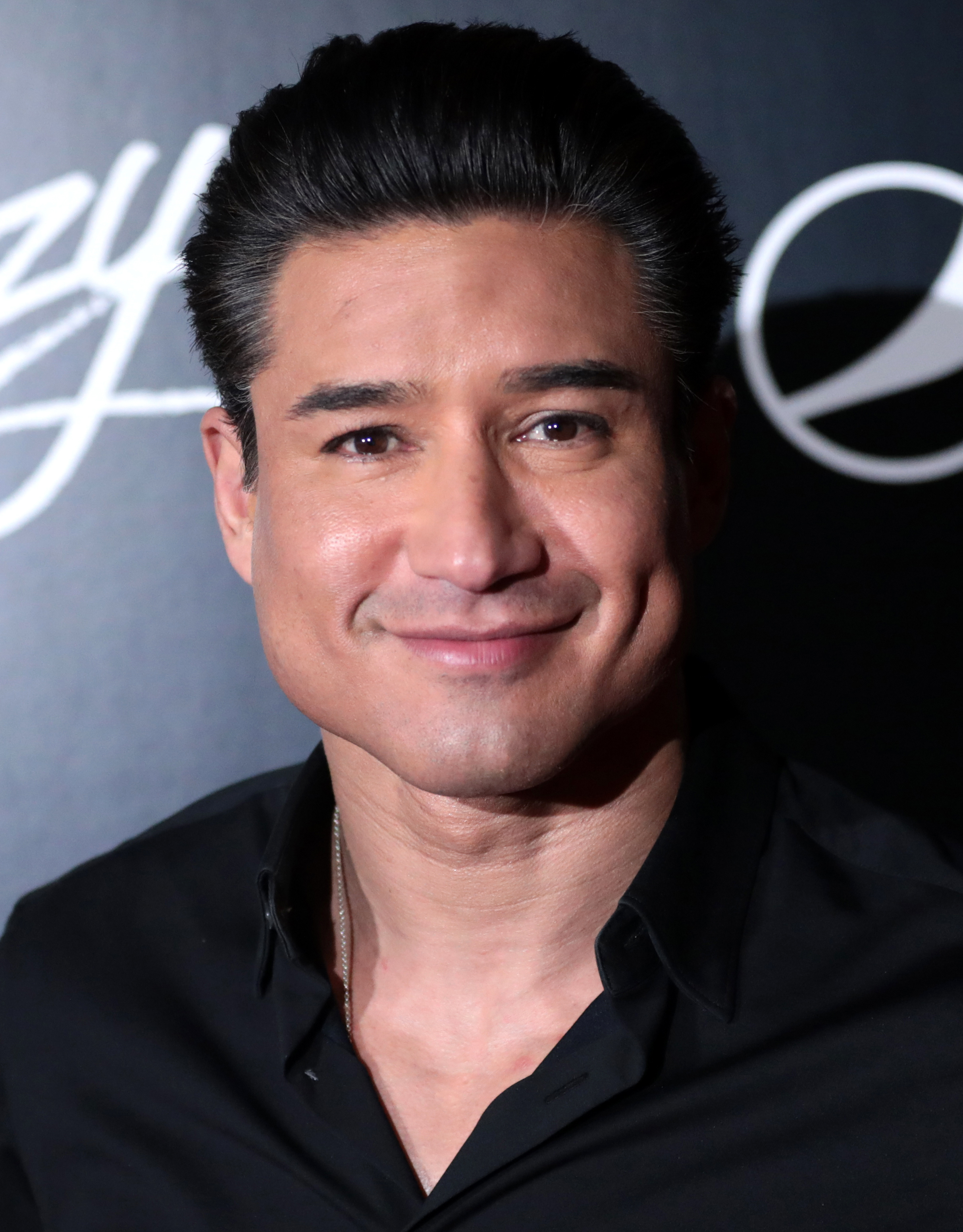
- Lopez in 2023
- Born: October 10, 1973 (age 53); Chula Vista, California, U.S.
- Occupations: Actor; television host
- Years active: 1984–present
- Spouses: Ali Landry (m. 2004; ann. 2004) Courtney Mazza (m. 2012)
- Children: 3
- Relatives: Kailee Wong (brother-in-law)

Mario Lopez (born October 10, 1973) is an American actor and television host. He has appeared on several television series, in films, and on Broadway. He is known for his portrayal of A.C. Slater on Saved by the Bell, Saved by the Bell: The College Years, and the 2020 sequel series. He has appeared in numerous projects since, including the third season of Dancing with the Stars and as host for the syndicated entertainment news magazine shows Extra and Access Hollywood. He has also hosted America's Best Dance Crew for MTV. In 2012, he co-hosted the second season of the American version of The X Factor with Khloé Kardashian, and was the sole host for the third and final season.

== Early life, family and education ==
Lopez was born on October 10, 1973, in Chula Vista, California, the son of Elvira Soledad Trasviña and Mario Alberto López Pérez. Lopez was raised in a Catholic family. His parents are both emigrants from Mexico. His father was born in Culiacán, Sinaloa, and his mother in Tijuana, Baja California. His younger sister, Marissa, is married to former NFL Minnesota Vikings and Houston Texans linebacker Kailee Wong.

Lopez started dance education at age three, training in tap and jazz. He also did tumbling, karate and wrestling at his local Boys and Girls Club when he was 7 years old. He excelled at these as well as other activities in which his mother enrolled him. During high school at Chula Vista High School, he was on the school's wrestling team at the weight class of 160 lb (73 kg). He placed 2nd in the San Diego Section competition and 7th in California his senior year. He graduated in 1991.

== Career ==
Lopez was discovered by a talent agent at a dance recital when he was 10 years old. He initially worked in local advertisements and commercials before making TV appearances.

=== Acting ===
Lopez began acting in 1984 when he appeared as younger brother Tomás in the short-lived ABC comedy series a.k.a. Pablo. That same year, he was cast as a drummer and dancer on Kids Incorporated; he performed on three seasons. In March 1987, he was cast as a guest star on the sitcom The Golden Girls as a Latino boy named Mario who faces deportation. He was cast in a small part in the film Colors (1988) as Felipe's friend.

Lopez was cast in 1989 as A.C. Slater in the television Saturday-morning series sitcom Saved by the Bell (1989–1993), and its spinoff Saved by the Bell: The College Years (1993–1994). On February 4, 2015, Lopez reunited with Mark-Paul Gosselaar, Elizabeth Berkley, Dennis Haskins, and Tiffani Thiessen on The Tonight Show Starring Jimmy Fallon, where they appeared in a Saved by the Bell sketch with Fallon. In 2020, Lopez reprised the role of A.C. Slater in Peacock's sequel series, Saved by the Bell.

In 1997, Lopez starred as Olympic diver Greg Louganis in the television film Breaking the Surface: The Greg Louganis Story. The following year, he was cast as Bobby Cruz in the USA Network series Pacific Blue for two seasons before it was canceled after the fifth season; he then went on to guest star on Resurrection Blvd., Eve, and The Bad Girl's Guide. In March 2006, Lopez joined the cast of the daytime soap opera The Bold and the Beautiful playing the role of Dr. Christian Ramirez. On July 18, 2006, he was released from his B&B contract. Later that year, Mario guest-starred as a plastic surgeon who drives Christian Troy to jealousy when he sees him naked in the shower in an episode of FX Network's Nip/Tuck during the show's fourth season, which began in autumn 2006. He also made an appearance on George Lopez as a police officer in late 2006.

Also in the fall of 2006, Lopez signed on as a contestant on the third season of Dancing with the Stars on ABC with professional partner and then-girlfriend Karina Smirnoff who was making her series debut. They finished in second place, losing to the team of Emmitt Smith and Cheryl Burke.

Lopez and Courtney Mazza had a reality show on VH1 called Mario Lopez: Saved by the Baby which premiered on November 1, 2010. Lopez guest-starred as a reporter for Extra Sesame Street in the Sesame Street episode "The Veggie Monster" in 2012.

In December 2020, Lopez starred as Colonel Sanders in A Recipe for Seduction, a short film from Lifetime and KFC. In 2024, Lopez signed a multi-year deal with Great American Media.

=== Hosting duties ===
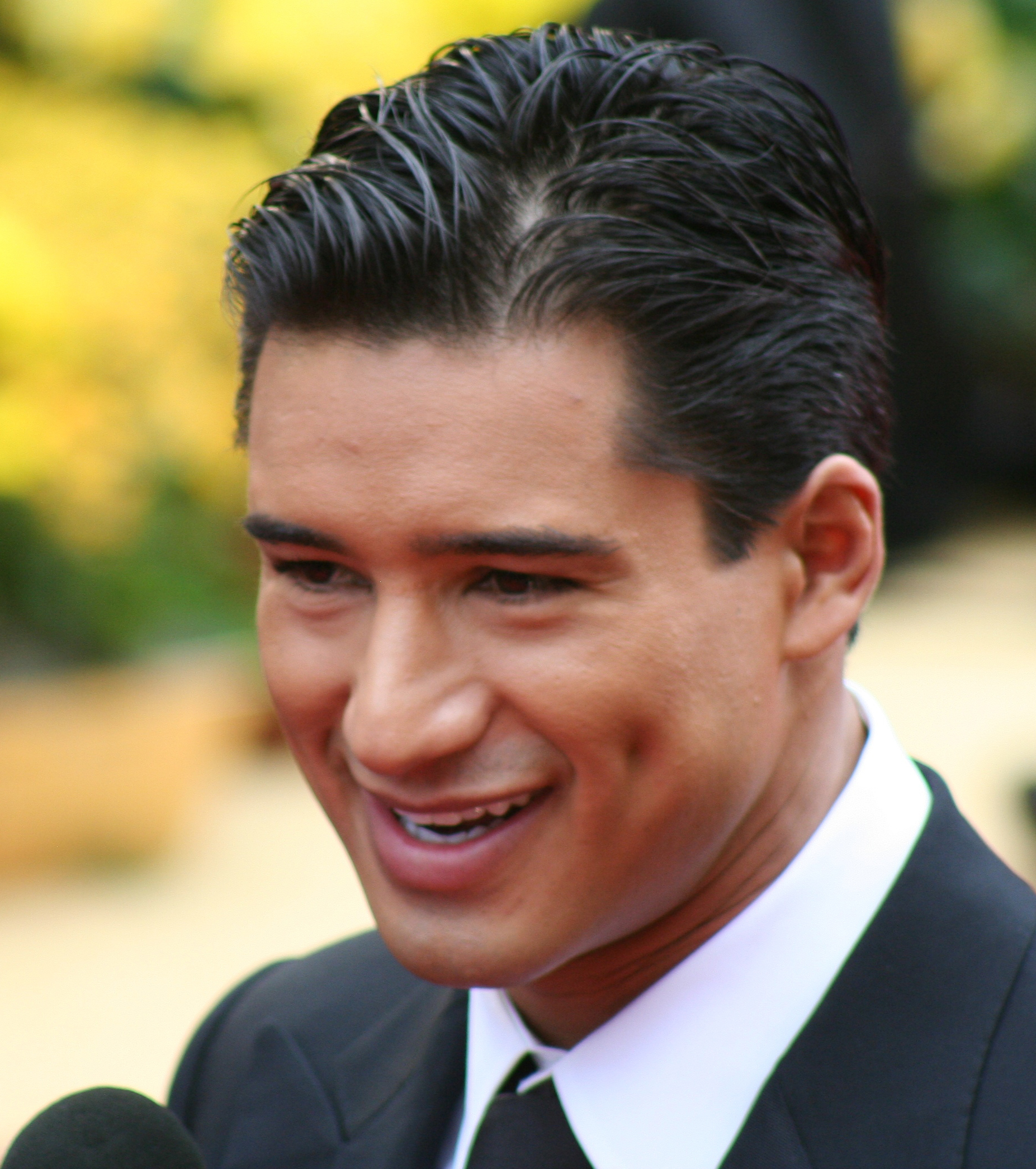
Lopez at the 81st Academy Awards, February 20, 2009

In 1992, he hosted his first series on NBC, called Name Your Adventure. He hosted the serial tabloid Extra, as well as the MTV reality shows America's Best Dance Crew and MTV's Top Pop Group. In the 1995–96 season, he hosted the second season of Masters of the Maze on what was then The Family Channel. Lopez is both the host (with Carmen Palumbo) and co-executive producer of Sí TV's Dating Factory. From October to December 2012, he co-hosted the Fox singing competition The X Factor along with Khloe Kardashian. In September 2013, Lopez returned to the show as sole host for season 3 after Kardashian was not asked back as co-host. The X Factor was cancelled on February 7, 2014. From 2002 to 2005, he was the host of the Animal Planet show Pet Star, despite some difficulty with an allergy to cats. Lopez hosted the Miss America pageant in 2007, 2009, and 2010.

Lopez has guest co-hosted The Wendy Williams Show, and MCed the gala benefit for the 2010 Pageant of the Masters arts festival in Laguna Beach, California.

Starting in 2012, Lopez began hosting his own nationally syndicated radio show, ON with Mario Lopez, for Premiere Radio. It streams online daily on iHeartRadio and airs on selected CHR and Hot AC stations (particularly on KBIG-FM/Los Angeles) throughout the United States.

In August 2014, Lopez began hosting the Hot AC edition of the iHeartRadio Countdown.

In July 2019, it was reported that Lopez would be leaving his duties hosting Extra in order to host rival program Access Hollywood. In November 2019 Lopez was the grand marshal of the Hollywood Christmas Parade.

In 2024, Lopez began hosting the Game Show Network series Blank Slate.

=== Stage career ===
Outside of TV, Lopez made his Broadway debut on April 15, 2008, in the revival of the musical A Chorus Line as Zach.

=== Books ===
Lopez has published three non-fiction books. The first, Mario Lopez Knockout Fitness, was published in 2008 and written together with Jeff O'Connell (who had previously written a fitness book with LL Cool J). His book Extra Lean followed in early 2010 and became a New York Times bestseller. Extra Lean Family was published in May 2012. He released a children's book entitled Mario and Baby Gia by Celebra Children's Books (a division of Penguin Books), on September 27, 2011. The book is about Lopez and his daughter.

=== Musical ===
In 2022, it was announced that Lopez is involved in an effort to revive the Puerto Rican boy band Menudo, as he oversaw auditions that took place, in a project named "Menudo: A New Beginning". Lopez helped revive the band as their new manager, and in 2023, Menudo released their first single under Lopez, named "Mi Amore".

== Personal life ==
According to Lopez, Fergie was his first kiss, and the two were involved briefly while they were both on the show Kids Incorporated.

In 1993, Lopez was accused of date rape, but prosecutors found no evidence to support the allegation, and multiple witnesses "contradicted the woman's account of her encounter" with Lopez.

After six years of dating, Lopez married actress Ali Landry on April 24, 2004, in a Catholic ceremony at the Las Alamandas resort outside Puerto Vallarta, Mexico, but their marriage was annulled two weeks later. In a 2011 interview, Lopez admitted that the parting transpired after Landry discovered Lopez was unfaithful to her days before the wedding at his bachelor party. Lopez dated professional dancer Karina Smirnoff, his Dancing with the Stars partner, from 2006 to June 2008.

In the fall of 2008, Lopez met Broadway dancer, actress, and producer Courtney Mazza on A Chorus Line on Broadway in New York. They married in Punta Mita, Mexico, on December 1, 2012. They have a daughter Gia (b. 2010) and two sons Dominic & Santino (b. 2013 and 2019).

Lopez has stated that he is Catholic and goes to church every week. In March 2018, he underwent baptism by immersion at the Jordan River, which was administered by a Catholic priest.

He is a proponent of health and fitness, and was the cover feature for the November 2013 issue of FitnessRX For Men magazine. To complement his fitness regime, Lopez is an amateur boxer and a brown belt in Brazilian jiu-jitsu; he began training in early 2017 and received his blue belt in February 2018 under Professor Robert Hill of Gracie Barra Glendale. He received his purple belt in November 2022. Then in 2026 he won the IBJJF Master North American Championship and was promoted to brown belt on the podium.

In a 2019 interview with conservative political commentator Candace Owens, Lopez revealed he was registered as an independent voter but aligns with conservative principles. In the interview, Lopez described support of transgender youth by parents as ‘dangerous.’ Lopez later denounced his comments labeling them as ‘ignorant’ and stated he is a supporter of the LGBTQ+ community. Lopez has expressed support for immigration, labeling immigrants as “…what makes America beautiful”.

== Filmography ==
=== Film ===
Year	Title	Role	Notes
1986	Chartbusters	N/A	Direct-to-video film
1988	Colors	Felipe's Friend	
1996	Depraved	Jessie Mata	
1996	Fever Lake	Steve	Direct-to-video film
1996	El Cóndor de oro	Bodyguard 2	
1997	The Journey: Absolution	Ryan Murphy	
1999	Eastside	Antonio Lopez	
2000	A Crack in the Floor	Lehman	
2000	Big Brother Trouble	Coach	
2002	Outta Time	David Morales	Alternative titles: The Courier, Out of Time
2002	King Rikki	Juan Vallejo	Alternative title: The Street King
2005	Aloha, Scooby-Doo!	Manu Tuiama/Mainland Surfer	Voice, direct-to-video
2006	Unaccompanied Minors	Substitute Minors watcher	
2010	Get Him to the Greek	Himself	Cameo
2011	Honey 2	Himself	
2013	The Smurfs 2	Social Smurf	Voice
2014	The Dog Who Saved Easter	Zeus the Dog	Voice, direct-to-video
2015	The Dog Who Saved Summer	Zeus the Dog	Voice, direct-to-video
2016	Popstar: Never Stop Never Stopping	Himself	
2019	Fantastica: A Boonie Bears Adventure	Briar	Voice, English version
2025	Zootopia 2	Denny Howlett	Voice

=== Television ===
Year	Title	Role	Notes
1984	a.k.a. Pablo	Tomas Del Gato	Main role
1984–1986	Kids Incorporated	Himself	Dancer/Drummer (seasons 1–3)
1986	The Deacon Street Deer	Hector	Television film
1987	The Golden Girls	Mario	Episode: "Dorothy's Prized Pupil"
1989–1993	Saved by the Bell	A.C. Slater	Main role
1992–1995	Name Your Adventure	Himself	Host
1992	Saved by the Bell: Hawaiian Style	A.C. Slater	Television film
1993–1994	Saved by the Bell: The College Years	A.C. Slater	Main role
1994	Saved by the Bell: Wedding in Las Vegas	A.C. Slater	Television film
1994	Bill Nye the Science Guy	Himself	Communication cameo
1995–1996	Saved by the Bell: The New Class	A.C. Slater	Episodes: "Goodbye, Bayside Part 2" and "Fire at the Max Part 2"
1995–1996	Masters of the Maze	Himself	Host (season 2)
1997	Breaking the Surface: The Greg Louganis Story	Greg Louganis	Television film
1997	Killing Mr. Griffin	Dave Ruggles	Television film
1999	Pacific Blue	Bobby Cruz	Main role (seasons 4–5)
2001–2003	The Other Half	Himself	Host
2002–2005	Pet Star	Himself	Host
2004	The Soluna Project	Antonio	Television film
2005	Extreme Dodgeball	Self	Contestant (season 3) - part of Los Angeles Armed Response
2006	The Bold and the Beautiful	Christian Ramirez	Contract role, 46 episodes
2006	Dancing with the Stars	Himself	Contestant (season 3)
2006–2010	Nip/Tuck	Dr. Mike Hamoui	Recurring role, 8 episodes
2007	George Lopez	Police Officer Sanchez	Episode: "George Can't Let Sleeping Mexicans Lie"
2007	Holiday in Handcuffs	David Martin	Television film
2007	Miss Universe 2007	Himself	Host
2008	Husband for Hire	Marco	Television film
2008	MTV's Top Pop Group	Himself	Host
2008–2012	America's Best Dance Crew	Himself	Host
2008	Robot Chicken	A.C Slater	Voice, episode: "Boo Cocky"
2008–2019	Extra	Himself	Host
2009	The Dog Who Saved Christmas	Zeus the Dog	Voice, television film
2010	The Spin Crowd	Himself	Episode: "Image Is Everything"
2010–2011	Mario Lopez: Saved by the Baby	Himself	Lead role
2010	The Dog Who Saved Christmas Vacation	Zeus the Dog	Voice, television film
2011	H8R	Himself	Host
2011–2012	Disney Parks Christmas Day Parade	Himself	Host
2012	Sesame Street	Himself (reporter)	Episode: "The Veggie Monster"
2012	Are You There, Chelsea?	Himself	Episode: "Dee Dee's Pillow"
2012–2013	The X Factor	Himself	Co-host (season 2)
2012–2013	The Chica Show	Stitches	Voice
2015–2016	Nashville	Himself	Episodes: "I've Got Reasons to Hate You" and "The Trouble with the Truth"
2015	Major Crimes	Himself	Episode: "Reality Check"
2015	Dinner at Tiffani's	Himself	Episode: "Come in For Comfort Food"
2016	Grease: Live	Vince Fontaine	Television film
2016	Almost Royal	Himself	1 episode
2016	NCIS: New Orleans	NOPD Officer Hernandez	Episode: "Man On Fire"
2017	Candy Crush	Himself	Host
2017	A Very Merry Toy Store	Will DiNova	Television film
2018	Elena of Avalor	Cruz	Voice, 7 episodes
2018	Jane the Virgin	Himself	Episode: "Chapter Seventy-Nine"
2018–2019	The Adventures of Rocky and Bullwinkle	Himself	Recurring voice role
2019	Brooklyn Nine-Nine	Himself	Episode: "Four Movements"
2019	The Rookie	Himself	Episode: "GreenLight”
2019–2026	Access Hollywood	Himself	Host
2020	The Expanding Universe of Ashley Garcia	Nico	Recurring role, 5 episodes; also co-creator and executive producer
2020	Feliz NaviDAD	David	Television film
2020–2021	Saved by the Bell	A.C. Slater	Main role
2020	A Recipe for Seduction	Harland Sanders	Short television film
2020	Miss Universe 2020	Himself	Host
2021	Holiday in Santa Fe	Tony Ortega	Television film
2022	Family Guy	Himself	Voice, episode: "Oscars Guy"
2022	Steppin' into the Holiday	Billy Holiday	Television film
2024–present	Blank Slate	Himself	Host
2026	Wonder Man	Himself	Episode: "Doorman"
2026	Spidey and His Amazing Friends	Mister Fantastic (voice)	

== Awards ==
Year	Group	Award	Role	Result	Ref.
1990	Young Artist Awards	Outstanding Young Ensemble Cast	Saved by the Bell	Nominated	
1991	Young Artist Awards	Best Young Actor Starring in an Off-Primetime Series	Saved by the Bell	Nominated	
1992	Young Artist Awards	Best Young Actor Starring in an Off-Primetime or Cable Series	Saved by the Bell	Nominated	
1993	Young Artist Awards	Outstanding Hosts for a Youth Magazine, News or Game Show	Name Your Adventure	Won	
1993	Young Artist Awards	Best Young Actor in an Off-Primetime Series	Saved by the Bell	Won	
1994	Young Artist Awards	Best Youth Actor in a TV Mini-Series, M.O.W. or Special	CBS Schoolbreak Special	Nominated	
1994	Young Artist Awards	Outstanding Youth Host in a TV Magazine, News or Variety Show	Name Your Adventure	Won	
1998	ALMA Awards	Outstanding Individual Performance in a Made-for-Television Movie or Mini-Series in a Crossover Role	Breaking the Surface: The Greg Louganis Story	Nominated	
1999	ALMA Awards	Outstanding Actor in a Drama Series	Pacific Blue	Nominated	
2006	Imagen Foundation Awards	Best Supporting Actor	The Bold and the Beautiful	Nominated	
2009	Teen Choice Awards	Choice TV Personality	Randy Jackson Presents America's Best Dance Crew	Nominated	
2010	Teen Choice Awards	Choice TV Personality	Himself	Nominated	
2011	ALMA Awards	Favorite TV Reality, Variety, or Comedy Personality or Act	Mario Lopez: Saved By the Baby	Nominated	
2011	Young Artist Awards	Mickey Rooney Award	Himself	Won	

Awards and achievements
Preceded by Jerry Rice & Anna Trebunskaya	Dancing with the Stars (U.S.) runner up Season 3 (Fall 2006 with Karina Smirnoff)	Succeeded by Joey Fatone & Kym Johnson

Media offices
Preceded by J. D. Roth	Host of Masters of the Maze; 1995–1996	Succeeded by series cancelled
Preceded by Nancy O'Dell and Carlos Ponce	Hosts of Miss Universe with Vanessa Minnillo; 2007	Succeeded by Jerry Springer and Mel B
Preceded by Steve Harvey	Hosts of Miss Universe with Olivia Culpo; 2020	Succeeded by Steve Harvey
Preceded by James Denton	Host of Miss America; 2007	Succeeded by Mark Steines
Preceded by Mark Steines	Host of Miss America; 2009–2010	Succeeded by Chris Harrison and Brooke Burke Charvet
