= Psyop (company) =

Commercial production company

Psyop, Inc.
- Type: Private corporation
- Industry: Advertising; entertainment; gaming
- Founded: 2000; 26 years ago in New York City, United States
- Founders: Marie Hyon; Kylie Matulick; Eben Mears; Todd Mueller; Marco Spier
- Headquarters: New York City & Los Angeles, United States
- Website: psyop.com

Psyop is a production studio with offices in New York City, Los Angeles, Hamburg and Stuttgart.

== History ==
Psyop was founded in 2000 by Marco Spier, Marie Hyon, Todd Mueller, Kylie Matulick and Eben Mears in New York City. In 2013, Psyop opened Psyop Games, a video game publishing division run by Muse Games co-founder Brian Kehrer. In 2022, Psyop launched in Germany with offices in Hamburg and Stuttgart.

== Original Productions ==
In 2015, Psyop released an animated series, "Grandma's Cats Are Trying To Kill Her," in collaboration with DreamWorks Animation.

In 2016, Psyop launched a VR experience, "Kismet," a virtual fortune-telling machine for HTC Vive, Oculus Rift, and PlayStation VR headsets.

In 2019, Psyop released a dating simulator, I Love You Colonel Sanders! A Finger Lickin’ Good Dating Simulator, in collaboration with KFC.

In 2020, Psyop, working with Supercell company, produced a short film Lost & Crowned, was uploaded on September 12, 2020, and qualified for Oscars recognition in December. They also collaborated on Absolut's It's In Our Spirit campaign, which was recognized for its motion design.

In 2022, during a Dead by Daylight developer livestream on May 17, it was announced that the game's developer, Behaviour Interactive, would be collaborating with Psyop to produce a dating sim spinoff titled Hooked on You: A Dead by Daylight Dating Sim.
