= Hatoful Boyfriend =

2011 video game

- Japanese cover art of the Hurtful Complete Edition of Hatoful Boyfriend
- Developers: PigeoNation Inc.; Mediatonic (remake)
- Publishers: PigeoNation Inc.; Devolver Digital (remake)
- Directors: Hato Moa; Jeff Tanton (remake)
- Producers: Hato Moa; Anna Morris (remake); Luke Borrett (remake)
- Programmers: Hato Moa; Sherif Aziz (remake); Lindsay Cox (remake)
- Artists: Hato Moa; Gregor Kari (remake); Adam Walker (remake); Celine Choo (remake); Marija Tiurina (remake)
- Writer: Hato Moa
- Engine: FamousWriter (original); Unity (remake)
- Platforms: Android; iOS; Microsoft Windows; OS X; Linux; PlayStation 4; PlayStation Vita
- Release: Free version; JP: 31 July 2011; Plus; JP: 14 August 2011; WW: 13 April 2014; Hurtful Complete Edition; JP: 30 October 2011; WW: 15 February 2012; Full version; 13 April 2014; HD; Windows, OS X, Linux; 4 September 2014; PS4, PS Vita; NA: 21 July 2015; EU: 22 July 2015 iOS; 25 May 2016; Android; 13 July 2016
- Genres: Nakige, dating sim, otome
- Mode: Single-player

Hatoful Boyfriend: A School of Hope and White Wings (Japanese: はーとふる彼氏 〜希望の学園と白い翼〜, Hepburn: Hātofuru kareshi ~kibō no gakuen to shiroi tsubasa~) is a Japanese dōjin soft otome visual novel released in 2011 for Microsoft Windows and OS X, in which all the characters other than the protagonist are sapient birds. It was developed by manga artist Hato Moa's dōjin circle PigeoNation Inc., and is the successor of a Flash game of the same name she created for April Fools' Day in 2011.

A free demo version of Hatoful made with the FamousWriter engine was released later that year, followed by a full commercial version released on 30 October 2011 at Comitia 98, and an English version released in February 2012. An international remake by developer Mediatonic and publisher Devolver Digital, dubbed Hatoful Boyfriend HD in Japan, was released on 4 September 2014 for Microsoft Windows, OS X, and Linux and for PlayStation 4 and PlayStation Vita on 21 July 2015 in North America, and on 22 July 2015 in Europe, respectively. A port for iOS was released on 25 May 2016.

Hatoful Boyfriend received generally positive reception; reviewers praised the game's replay value as well as its writing and characterization, while repetitive gameplay and the accessibility of the game's Bad Boys Love mode received a more mixed response. A sequel, Hatoful Boyfriend: Holiday Star, was released on 29 December 2011, with an English version being released on Christmas Day the following year. In addition to the main games in the series, Hatoful Boyfriend has made transitions into other media: a monthly webcomic was serialized in the anthology Manga Life WIN+, several supplementary materials and official dōjin works have been released, and four drama CDs based on the series have been made. An episodic web series began in 2014.

== Gameplay ==

A bird, Ryouta, flirting with the player in the original version (top) and the 2014 remake (bottom). The in-game date is shown in the top left, and the arrow button in the top right allows the player to skip dialogue.

Hatoful Boyfriend is an interactive text-based visual novel that follows a branching plot line, with the player's decisions determining which of the game's multiple endings they receive. The title is a pun on the wasei-eigo word hātofuru (ハートフル; "heartful"), and the Japanese word hato (鳩; "pigeon", "dove"), as the game features pigeons and other birds as major characters. The game is set in a version of Earth populated by sapient birds, and its main story follows the player character and protagonist—the only human attending St. PigeoNation's Institute, an elite school for birds—as she finds love among her avian acquaintances.

Bad Boys Love, a hidden alternate story mode, opens with the discovery of the protagonist's corpse, after which the player follows her best friend Ryouta Kawara as he investigates the circumstances of her death and unravels darker conspiracies surrounding the school.

Gameplay in Hatoful Boyfriend is similar to most other visual novels for the PC, with the controls limited to the mouse and the only interactions being clicking to forward the game's narrative or to choose between multiple plot choices. The keyboard can also be used instead of the mouse, with the 'enter' key serving the same purpose as clicking. The save button can be employed at any point during the game, which also features several pages of save slots, allowing gameplay to be easily picked up from prior to a choice the player made. An arrow button in the upper right corner also allows the player to skip dialogue and interactions they have already experienced.

The player assumes control of the protagonist, a teenage human girl. As the game follows a branching plot line with multiple endings, at various points during gameplay the player is allowed to make choices that determine which character's romance route the player will encounter. On weekdays, the player can also choose which classes to attend, which changes one of the protagonist's three stats depending on the activity chosen. Having certain stat values are required to obtain the good endings for each love interest and to otherwise advance along certain routes. There are thirteen (fourteen in the 2014 remake) endings in total: one ending for each of the main love interests, three extended endings for three of the love interests based on stat values, one ending for the gaiden-esque Torimi Café storyline, and one ending attained if the player fails to romance any character.

When routes are completed, documents are unlocked that provide insights into the game's overarching storyline. These documents can be viewed at any time in the game's archive feature, which is accessed from the title screen. After obtaining the four specific endings required to trigger it, the player is given a new prompt to either "fulfill the promise" or live "a normal life" upon starting a new game. Choosing to live a normal life will result in a normal playthrough, while choosing to fulfill the promise locks the player into the true route or scenario Bad Boys Love, or BBL (also known as Hurtful Boyfriend), which explores the full extent of the underlying plot alluded to by the documents and various points of foreshadowing in the dating simulation portion of the game. If the player chooses to fulfill the promise, aside from several dream sequences, gameplay at first appears to continue normally until the in-game date is 2 September. The player's perspective then switches from the protagonist to the protagonist's best friend, and the events of the scenario begin regardless of any other choices made by the player up to that point. If the player obtains all other possible endings prior to starting Bad Boys Love, an extended epilogue plays after the game's credits upon completion of the scenario. In a departure from the generally lighthearted romantic routes, Bad Boys Love is presented as a murder mystery psychological thriller, and is significantly longer than any other route in Hatoful Boyfriend, making up most of the game's actual length.

There are several changes to gameplay and the way text is displayed during Bad Boys Love in the original version of the game: saving is disabled except at certain points in the story, the function to skip dialogue and interactions is removed, and plot-important dialogue and narrative are highlighted with colored text; usually yellow, though text of particularly critical importance is highlighted in red. In the 2014 remake however, the option to save is available at all times, the skip function is retained, and text is no longer highlighted. In both versions, the game's interface and controls change from that of a standard visual novel to similar to that of a '90s-era turn-based role-playing game during certain segments of the narrative.

== Plot ==
=== Setting ===
Hatoful Boyfriend is set in an alternate version of Earth in which sapient birds have seemingly taken the place of humans in society for reasons that are hinted at, but not fully explained in the dating simulation portion of the game. In Bad Boys Love, it is revealed that Hatoful is set in a post-apocalyptic, dystopian future—in which a pandemic of a deadly, mutated strain of the H5N1 virus, or bird flu, nearly wipes out mankind in the year 2068. The release of a counter-virus, cultivated to destroy the virus' avian carriers in a desperate attempt to stop the spread of the disease, ends up backfiring as birds who resisted the counter-virus instead developed human-level intelligence. War soon breaks out between the newly uplifted birds and the remnants of humanity, resulting in birds emerging as the planet's new dominant lifeforms as humans continued to succumb to the disease. Following several terrorist attacks by a human insurgency, all remaining humans have been forced to live in the wilderness away from civilization in a form of apartheid-like segregation.

The game's story takes place primarily at the St. PigeoNation's Institute (聖ピジョネイション学園, Sei Pijoneishon Gakuen)—a bird-only high school located in the fictional Japanese town of Littledove Hachiman City (小鳩八幡市, Kobato Hachiman-shi)—long after open warfare between humans and birds has ended. Society has adjusted to the avian conquest, though with minor bird-related cultural changes—for example, while some holidays such as Christmas and Tanabata are celebrated much as they are in the present day, a major event in the game is Legumentine's Day, an amalgamation of the traditions of Valentine's Day and Setsubun. In a more grim case, the terms war dove and war hawk have been re-purposed as labels for two opposing political factions divided over the ongoing mutual hostility between birds and the human minority: the altruistic Dove Party, who advocate for cooperation and peace between the two groups, and the militant Hawk Party, whose goal is to exterminate humanity altogether. By the time Hatoful Boyfriend's narrative begins, the Dove Party, the Hawk Party, and their respective schools of thought dominate much of the world's politics.

=== Characters ===
The primary playable character in Hatoful Boyfriend is the human protagonist, a boisterous hunter-gatherer who lives in a cave in the wilderness. Her eight potential love interests in the original version of the game, who together form the rest of the main cast, are:

1. Ryouta Kawara, a rock dove and the protagonist's sickly but hardworking childhood friend;
2. Sakuya Le Bel Shirogane, a fantail pigeon and snobbish French aristocrat;
3. Sakuya's older half-brother Yuuya Sakazaki, a popular and flirtatious but strangely secretive fantail pigeon;
4. Nageki Fujishiro, a quiet, bookish mourning dove who never seems to leave the library;
5. San Oko, an athletic, hyperactive fantail pigeon who is obsessed with pudding;
6. Anghel Higure, an eccentric Luzon bleeding-heart who behaves as if he were in some kind of fantasy role-playing game;
7. Kazuaki Nanaki, a kind but narcoleptic button quail and the protagonist's homeroom teacher;
8. Shuu Iwamine, a creepy, antisocial chukar partridge who serves as the school's doctor.

In the 2014 remake, there became two more possible love interests:

1. Azami Koshiba, a no-nonsense Java sparrow and takoyaki saleswoman
2. Tohri Nishikikouji, a golden pheasant and Iwamine's long-forgotten work rival (only on PS4 and Vita, not PC.)

While most of the characters are normally represented in-game with pictures of birds, if the player toggles on the ICPSS (Intra-Cerebral Playback Synchro System) feature at the start of the game, or NS3 (脳内再生シンクロシステム, Nōnai Saisei Shinkuro Shisutemu) in Japan, each of the possible love interests is shown with a version of what they would look like as a human when first introduced. Although the ICPSS feature also lists voice credits for each of the main love interests in the original version of the game, the game itself is unvoiced; however most of the voice actors who were credited later signed on to actually voice their respective characters in the drama CDs based on the series.

=== Story ===
The events of Hatoful Boyfriend begin in the year 2188, when the protagonist, a teenage human girl invited to attend the prestigious bird-only St. PigeoNation's Institute, starts her second year of high school. After a hectic and surreal freshman year of attendance at St. PigeoNation's, the protagonist has grown accustomed to the confusion of being the only human in a school full of birds, and is looking forward to her sophomore year. The story of the dating simulation portion of the game follows the protagonist, and the inter-species love and hijinks—of both the mundane high school and quasi-anthropomorphic bird-specific varieties—that ensue as she draws the attention of and attempts to romance one of a number of eligible birds she comes in contact with over the course of the year.

==== Bad Boys Love ====
Should the player choose to go down this route, the protagonist begins her sophomore year at St. PigeoNation's largely as normal, but with one exception—she begins to have recurring dreams of her younger self and Ryouta, and her parents lying dead in front of an unfamiliar house. A mysterious man approaches them, promising to grant any wish that they make. On 2 September, she decides to check on Ryouta, who had gone to the infirmary earlier that day; the next morning, she fails to show up for class. Kazuaki asks Ryouta to retrieve their class' box of print handouts, and upon retrieving it, blood is discovered leaking from a corner of the box. Ryouta opens the lid, and it is revealed that the box contains the protagonist's severed head. A siren sounds and there is an order to evacuate to the gymnasium, where Ryouta overhears other students mention that more pieces of a human corpse were found in the other print boxes. Doubting the headmaster's explanation of a natural disaster occurring, Sakuya and Ryouta resolve to figure out the identity of the protagonist's killer and leave the gymnasium, discovering a large metal dome surrounding the school. Upon returning to their classroom and finding the box empty, Yuuya explains that the protagonist's body had been gathered in the chemistry lab, where Shuu performs an autopsy concluding that the protagonist died of asphyxiation caused by illness or poison with the dismemberment occurring afterwards.

The player's first encounter with Labor 9 during Bad Boys Love. Elements of horror are prevalent throughout the scenario.

Assisted by the school janitor Mister One, and pursued by a grotesque scarecrow-like being named Labor 9 who suddenly appears on the school grounds, Ryouta and Sakuya begin investigating the dome and the murder. They visit the lab and compare alibis; Shuu, who Ryouta distrusts, asks if Ryouta has forgotten anything important, to which he replies that he hasn't. Upon investigating the headmaster's office, they discover the headmaster had likewise been poisoned to death, what they saw earlier being merely pre-recorded footage; they also find a computer and a pair of documents, one titled The Human Representative and a torn, unreadable one titled Operation Hatoful. The Human Representative reveals that if the protagonist, a symbol of humanity, were to die, the campus would be sealed off and the birds inside handed over to humans as sacrifices—something confirmed when the computer is used to open a small hatch in the dome and students are shot dead as they attempt to flee—when the dome is lifted twelve hours after her death is reported.

In trying to find a way to escape before the dome rises, Ryouta and Sakuya uncover records in the library mentioning a medical center that was shut down due to a fire, and that the ghostly Nageki, who Ryouta previously encountered, died in that fire. Sakuya deduces that an unused building on campus was the medical center and after investigating, they find its basement blocked off. They also encounter Anghel, who recalls the protagonist going into the infirmary the day before, contradicting Yuuya and Shuu's shared alibi. As Ryouta searches the infirmary for clues, he finds medical records for himself, the protagonist, Nageki, and Sakuya, but is knocked out immediately after. When he regains consciousness, he discovers the protagonist's bloody student ID—now with concrete evidence, Ryouta prepares to confront the doctor and Yuuya, only to find that Sakuya had left to do so alone. Ryouta returns to the infirmary as Yuuya shields Sakuya from Shuu's attempts to kill him; the doctor tells Ryouta that he will be waiting for him in the medical center's basement before escaping with Labor 9. Yuuya apologizes, affirming that while neither he nor Shuu killed the protagonist, they were the ones who dismembered her, and asks to speak to Sakuya alone. He reveals that they are full-blooded siblings, with Shuu using knowledge of Sakuya's true heritage to blackmail Yuuya into assisting him. Yuuya seemingly dies, Shuu's scalpel having been laced with the same neurotoxin that killed the headmaster, leaving Sakuya in a state of shock.

Ryouta, searching for a way into the medical center basement, seeks out Nageki, a ghost, in the library to ask him about his death. Upon discovering documents revealing that Operation Hatoful was a Hawk Party project into developing biological weapons for use against humans using the school as an experimental facility—with a focus on a strain of H5N1 almost immediately lethal to humans dubbed the Charon virus—Nageki recalls that the fire was caused by his committing suicide by self-immolation after months of forced experimentation in order to destroy and remove any trace of the virus, which was isolated in his body, and that researchers often went in through the chemistry preparation room. Ryouta, Kazuaki, and Anghel make their way into the medical center's basement through the chemistry lab and encounter Labor 9, electrocuting it using a stun gun given to Ryouta earlier by Mister One. They confront Shuu, who imprisons Kazuaki and Anghel, leaving them to die of poison gas before leading Ryouta away. Meanwhile, San comforts Sakuya, and the two of them arrive to break Anghel and Kazuaki out of the prison.

Alone with Shuu, Ryouta finally remembers what he had forgotten due to the traumatic nature of the events: he recognizes the doctor as a man who promised to grant his wish for peace between birds and humans after he and the protagonist witnessed a human terrorist incident at a bird orphanage in which the protagonist's parents, crisis negotiators, were killed, and that the protagonist died when she visited him in the infirmary. It is revealed that she died by Charon virus after coming in contact with Ryouta, as Shuu had induced the virus into Ryouta's body though grafts from Nageki's remains for the purpose of using him to exterminate humanity—since there can be no more fighting between two factions if one is wiped out, this would grant Ryouta's wish. Shuu then remarks that Labor 9 was powered by the protagonist's now irreversibly damaged brain. A broken Ryouta submits to Shuu's offer of becoming a living weapon of mass destruction after these revelations, and a struggle ensues during which the protagonist's spirit intervenes. Ryouta then asks Shuu why he decided to grant his wish, to which it is implied that Shuu's affection towards Ryouta's deceased father, Ryuuji, was greater than Shuu himself would like to admit, and that he was motivated by Ryuuji's dying request: to do something for his son.

Shuu admits defeat and offers to lead them out of the school through a safe passage, but Kazuaki pulls out a gun and shoots him as the group prepares to escape. Shuu then recalls that Nageki's only relative—his adoptive brother—was, like Kazuaki, a quail. The terrorist incident occurred at Kazuaki and Nageki's orphanage and left them as the only survivors; witnessing Nageki's subsequent suicide drove Kazuaki insane, leading him to fake his own death, assume a new identity, and join the school's faculty to take revenge against Shuu, the head of Operation Hatoful. Ryouta, channeling Nageki, eases Kazuaki's guilt and convinces him to move on.

They reunite with the other characters and exit the school along with the other students and faculty brought there by Mister One; however Ryouta, now thoroughly infected by the Charon virus, elects to stay behind in cryonic storage until a cure is found. The scenario ends with Sakuya vowing to come back for Ryouta, and Ryouta offering to recap the day's events to the protagonist's spirit, within the remnants of Labor 9, as the door to the storage facility closes. If the extended epilogue is unlocked, it is revealed that Yuuya survived being poisoned long enough to receive an antidote, and the game's closing lines imply that with Shuu's cooperation, a cure for the Charon virus has been developed.

== Development ==
Hatoful Boyfriend is the first game developed by manga artist and writer Hato Moa—author of the series Vairocana and a former Dengeki Comic Grand Prix honoree—under her dōjin circle PigeoNation Inc. As she had no experience with game development prior to Hatoful, Hato initially wanted to start with a visual novel, as she believed it was an easier game type for amateur developers to make; the format also allowed visuals to easily accompany her stories, something that she, as a manga artist, was accustomed to and viewed as being necessary in her work. She first came up with the concept for Hatoful as a 2011 April Fools' Day joke: despite her lack of familiarity with the genre, she initially intended to create a parody of otome game stereotypes. Birds in particular were used as a theme due to Hato's fondness for pigeons; however, this was also partially due to Hato's prioritization of writing over illustrating, as the use of bird photographs instead of hand-drawn sprites allowed her more freedom to focus on the script. The first incarnation of the game was created over the course of half a day and posted as a browser game made with Adobe Flash; but due to strong word of mouth from social media it was taken down after immense traffic caused the web server it was hosted on to crash on two separate occasions. Following the unexpected popularity of the Flash game, development began on a longer visual novel using the FamousWriter game engine.

Most of the technical aspects of development—game direction, scripting, and programming—were handled by Hato alone, with fellow artist Damurushi assisting with some minor aspects of the script and art direction. Despite this, most of the roughly seven-month period Hato spent developing Hatoful from a one-off April Fools' gag to the finished product was dedicated to the construction of the narrative. Hato's approach towards the game's writing was "to create something that seems ridiculous and crazy at first glance, but that once you look into the world, you would fall into the depth"; however, resolving the darker elements of the plot, particularly the Bad Boys Love scenario, with facts established in the quickly conceived and largely comedic pilot proved to be difficult for her, with inconsistencies in the overall timeline becoming a major concern. During the writing process, Hato admitted that she was critical of the scenarios she had written and constantly doubted whether the final product "turned out well", later remarking in a postscript written for the game's official guidebook:

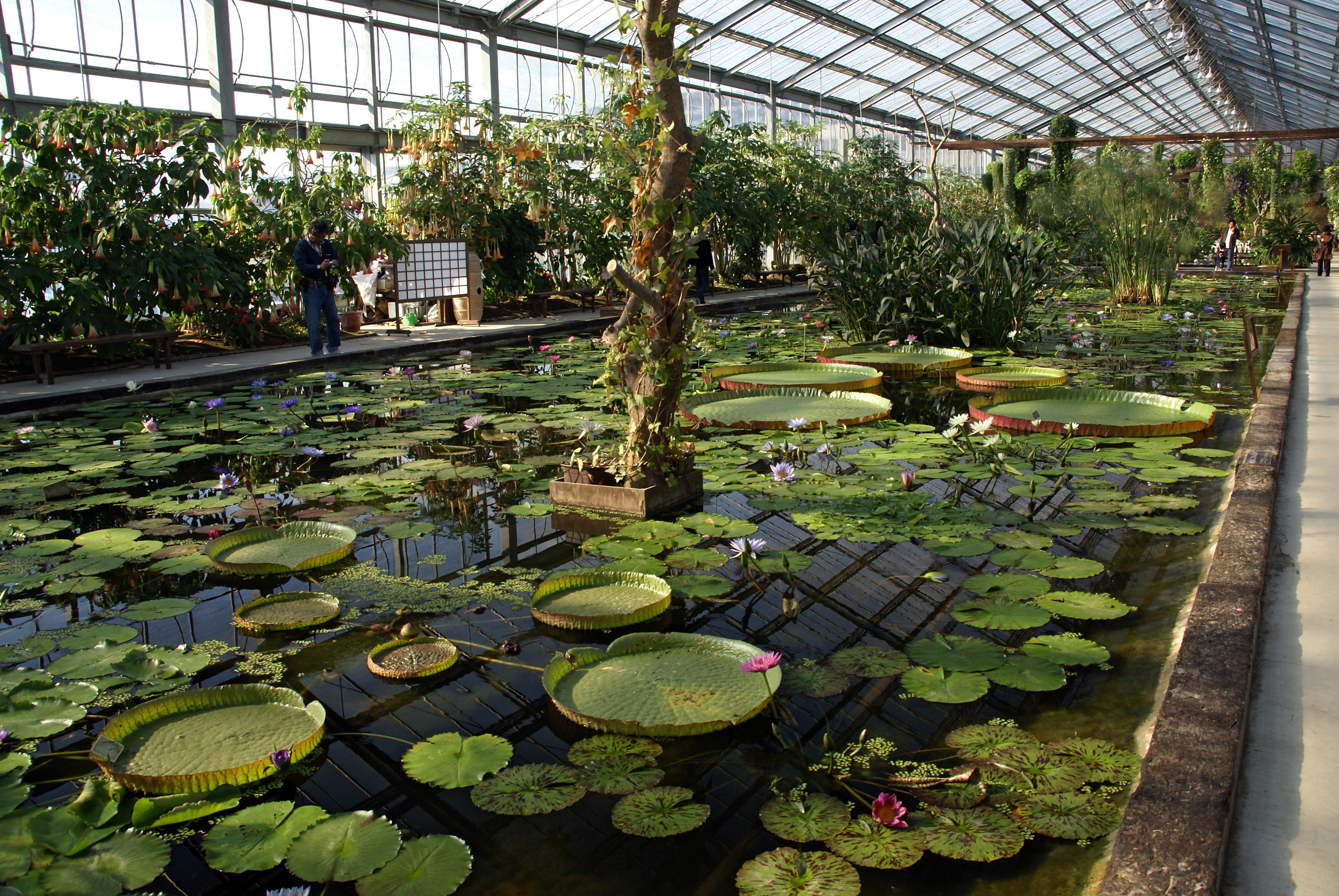
Kobe Animal Kingdom, a source of birds photographed for sprites used in Hatoful Boyfriend

...because I made the final game based on the character outlines on the April Fool's site, which I came up with in half a day, I can't deny that it might seem that the way [the plot] is structured is no good in some way. Otome route aside, when I was writing the scenario for the BBL route it seemed that no matter how I tried I couldn't get my head clear and into writing, so I caused myself grief every day. In the end, I finally managed to reach what I felt was a point of compromise, but I wonder how it was? My only hope is that the player themselves can enjoy the game.

Most of the background images and photography used for the characters' sprites in the original games and associated media are taken from royalty-free sources or fan submissions, though in some cases pictures of birds and backgrounds used are Hato's own artwork or photography—the character San Oko is depicted by and based on her real life pet bird Okosan, and several of the sprites featured in Hatoful Boyfriend were derived from pictures she had taken of birds kept at the Kobe Animal Kingdom or the Torimi Café, also located in Kobe. All of the music tracks and sound effects used in Hatoful are also similarly taken from royalty-free sources.

=== Naming and allusions ===
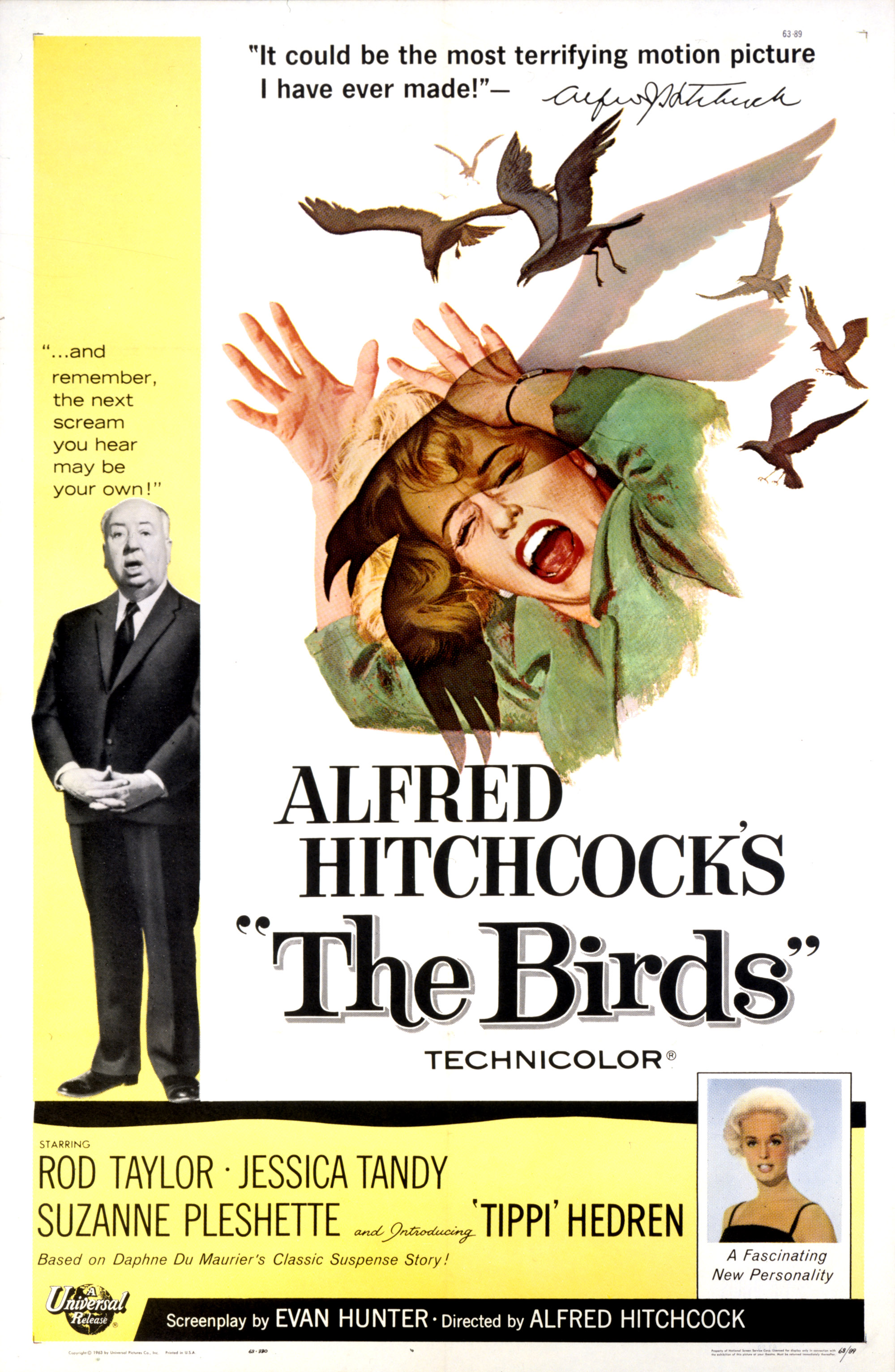
Parts of Hatoful Boyfriend's lore were inspired by The Birds.

The title of the game is a multi-layered pun; the wasei-eigo word hātofuru (ハートフル) means "heartful"; however, it is also phonetically identical to the Japanese pronunciation of the English word "hurtful". This is referenced in an alternate name for the Bad Boys Love route, Hurtful Boyfriend, as well as in the subtitle for the full release of the original game, Hatoful Boyfriend: Hurtful Complete Edition.

Additionally, the official English transliteration of the title also incorporates the Japanese word hato (鳩), which means "pigeon" or "dove," and is also one of the names of the game's creator, Hato Moa. Similarly, the names of several characters are puns on the Japanese names of their respective species of bird: for example, Ryouta Kawara is a rock dove, or kawarabato (河原鳩); Nageki Fujishiro is a mourning dove, or nagekibato (ナゲキバト); Shuu Iwamine is a chukar partridge, or iwashako (岩鷓鴣); and Kazuaki Nanaki is a button quail, or himeuzura (ヒメウズラ)—the character hime (姫) being present in his last name, Nanaki (七姫).

Several locations and personalities featured in the game directly correspond to real life venues and people—for example, blogger Brian Pigeon is mentioned as one of the Hatoful world's most influential writers. Likewise, some aspects of Hatoful's narrative reference real world events, media, or people: the deadly H5N1 pandemic forming the basis of the game's post-apocalyptic setting was inspired by historical outbreaks of disease, most prominently the 1918 flu pandemic; depictions of Hitchcock's Winter, the in-universe war between humans and birds, bear several similarities to Alfred Hitchcock's film The Birds; and Operation Carneades—the codename given to the human countermeasure against H5N1 that instead granted intelligence to birds in the Hatoful universe—was named after Greek philosopher Carneades and one of his thought experiments, the Plank of Carneades.

=== Release history ===
Hatoful Boyfriend's first release in its current visual novel format was a freeware demo released as a downloadable application on 31 July 2011. The demo version contains basic routes for seven of the love interests, and also functions as a benchmark for players to assess if the full game will run on their computer before purchasing it. The first commercial variant of the game, Hatoful Boyfriend: Plus, introducing Anghel as a love interest, was released on 14 August 2011. Plus, a precursor of the full game used as a debugging site for new content and additional scenes intended for the final release, was discontinued on 28 October 2011 when it was patched with the finalized full version. The completed full game itself, Hatoful Boyfriend: Hurtful Complete Edition, was released at COMITIA 98 on 30 October 2011, and includes all content in previous versions of the game as well as the Torimi Café and Bad Boys Love scenarios. In Japan, Plus and Hurtful Complete Edition were initially available only as physical CD-ROMs; a downloadable version of the full game in Japanese was eventually released three years later on 13 April 2014, where the Hurtful Complete Edition was renamed to simply Full version. Due to limitations of the FamousWriter game engine, the demo, Plus, and Hurtful Complete Edition versions of Hatoful Boyfriend are only supported on computers running Windows XP or OS X 10.1-10.5, but are playable—though unsupported—on computers running Windows Vista, Windows 7, or OS X 10.6 with Rosetta.

==== 2014 remake ====
Plans to remake the original game in high-definition first began to form when Ed Fear, a writer and creative producer at game developer Mediatonic, contacted Hato Moa about the possibility of translating any projects she was involved in to English. According to the remake's creative director Jeff Tanton, the decision was made to remake the game following several e-mail conversations between Fear and Hato, with Fear's positive experience with the Japanese version of the game and the incompatibility of FamousWriter-made games with newer operating systems—which had rendered the original game effectively unplayable on newer PCs—being major factors in the decision. An international remake of Hatoful developed by Mediatonic and published by Devolver Digital made using the Unity game engine—allowing the game to be fully compatible with computers that run Windows Vista, Windows 7 or OS X 10.6, and playable for the first time on those that run Linux or OS X 10.7 or newer—was first revealed to be in development on 6 June 2014, with a formal announcement coming shortly afterwards at Electronic Entertainment Expo 2014.

The remake, known as Hatoful Boyfriend HD in Japan, was originally slated for release via Steam on 21 August 2014; however release was later postponed to 4 September 2014 to allow for final adjustments to the Japanese version. The remake includes a new route for Azami, full screen capability, and redrawn backgrounds. A collector's edition of the remake titled Hatoful Boyfriend Summer of Dove Collector's Edition was released for pre-order along with the normal edition, and bundles together the remake, the original Hatoful Boyfriend: Hurtful Complete Edition, a digital version of the game's soundtrack, a new comic illustrated by Hato, exclusive wallpapers of Okosan, and a St. PigeoNation's Class of 2014 yearbook. The remake was also included in the Humble Bundle pack for Valentine's Day 2015, which exclusively featured dating sim games, along with a Hatoful Boyfriend pillowcase for the highest price point option. A port of the remake for PlayStation 4 and PlayStation Vita was released on 21 July 2015, as well as one for iOS on 25 May 2016.

=== English localization ===
On 22 November 2011, freelance translator Nazerine released a fan translation patch of the free demo version of the game. The initial project involved Nazerine translating, writing, and revising the game text, while another person hacked the game so that the translated text displayed properly on the game screen. This English patch launched the first wave of western interest in the game, with several video game publications reporting on it due to the game's unusual concept. The success of this translation attracted the attention of Hato Moa herself, who then offered Nazerine the opportunity to translate the full game—and later its sequel, Holiday Star—for an official English release. The translation process of the full game was also a solo effort by Nazerine; however, Hato removed the need for hacking by directly supervising the translation, adjusting images in the game for English sentences. As the demo's English patch was made before Nazerine had access to the full version of the game, several lines of dialogue were translated differently to reflect context revealed in Bad Boys Love; for example, third-person pronouns from Kazuaki Nanaki's route implying that he had a female lover in the fan translation were replaced with gender-neutral ones in the official translation. Few dramatic changes were made, though several jokes were added in Nazerine's translations of the game that were not present in the original Japanese text. The official English version of the game was released for download on 15 February 2012. The 2014 remake has also been confirmed to have used Nazerine's translation.

== Adaptations ==
=== Books and publications ===
Several official dōjin works and supplemental materials illustrated by Hato Moa and Damurushi have been released alongside the games. An official guidebook with extra information regarding the game's setting and characters was released at 29 December 2011 at Comiket 81. The second edition of the guidebook, re-branded as a "fanbook" (ISBN 978-4-7580-1280-5), and Absolute ZERO, an anthology about the fantasy universe perceived by Anghel Higure, were both released on 11 August 2012 at Comiket 82; an English version of Absolute ZERO was later released for Amazon Kindle on 27 August 2014. Kazuaki-kun's Book (一明くんの本, Kazuaki-kun no Hon), featuring an alternate universe retelling of events discussed in Holiday Star, was released in Japanese at COMIC CITY SPARK 7 on 7 October 2012, and on 23 December 2013 for Kindle in English. Focus on the Hawks! (フォーカス・ホークス, Fōkasu Hōkusu), an anthology featuring the Hawk Party researchers, was released in Japanese at Comiket 84 on 12 August 2013, and on 29 May 2014 for Kindle in English. Watari Bādo Kimama ni TORIARUKI Katte ni Sutema Kōbe Kachōen (渡りバード 気ままにTORIARUKI 勝手にステマ神戸花鳥園), a side story featuring the Kobe Animal Kingdom and written as part of a fundraising event for the venue, was released on 1 February 2014. Sabishii Uzura (さびしいウズラ), a collection of haiku poems written from the perspective of the original Kazuaki Nanaki, was released on 15 August 2014 at Comiket 86.

=== Webcomic ===
A webcomic based on the series, written and illustrated by Hato Moa, was serialized in publisher Takeshobo's webcomic anthology Manga Life WIN+ from 8 June 2012 until the anthology's discontinuation, containing sixteen chapters. Each chapter is composed of several four-panel comic strips, followed by a short story in which the characters are depicted in their human forms. The first twelve chapters have since been collected in one tankōbon volume (ISBN 978-4-8124-8387-9), which was released on 10 August 2013. The volume also contains a feature where the series' characters answered questions sent in by fans. A subsequent dōjin anthology containing chapters thirteen to sixteen plus a bonus ten-page comic, Hatoful Boyfriend Overload! Overflow! EX (はーとふる彼氏 はみでた!もれでた!EX, Hātofuru Kareshi Hamideta! Moredeta! EX), was released on 30 December 2013 at Comiket 85 in Japanese, and on Kindle in English.

=== Drama CDs ===
Four drama CDs by Frontier Works based on the series have been released. The first CD, titled Prologue (プロローグ, Purorōgu) had a preliminary release on 29 December 2011 at Comiket 81, and was released for general distribution on 25 January 2012. The second CD, titled Primal Feather, was released on 25 April 2012, followed by a third CD, titled Summer Vacation, on 10 August 2012 at Comiket 82, which had a general release on 12 September 2012. A fourth CD with a Legumentine's Day theme, titled Hatomame Sweet Blend (鳩豆スウィートブレンド, Hatomame Suwīto Burendo), was released on 14 February 2013.

=== Web radio ===
An internet radio show for the series titled Habatake! Sei Pijoneishon Gakuen Housōbu! (はばたけ!聖ピジョネイション学園放送部!) was broadcast from 24 December 2011 to 25 January 2012 on the Animate TV website, with the voice cast from the drama CDs reprising their respective roles. The show was hosted by Shintarō Asanuma, who played Ryouta Kawara in the drama CDs, and Hirofumi Nojima, who played Kazuaki Nanaki. Each episode consisted of four segments: Hatoota (はとおた), a normal talk corner, Hatalk (ハトーク, Hatōku), in which various questions regarding life as birds were answered, Koi no Denshobato (恋の伝書鳩), in which lines from the game were read, and The How and Why of St. PigeoNation's! (なぜ？なに？質問箱, Naze? Nani? Shitsumonbako), a question and answer corner where the voice actors answered any questions from viewers in-character.

=== Web series ===
A trailer for the web series was released in Japanese on 20 October 2013, with an English-language translation of the trailer being released on 23 May 2014. The first episode, titled Tamesareru Ketsui! Saraba Sei Pijoneishon (Zenpen) (試される決意！さらば聖ピジョネイション＜前編＞), was released on 19 May 2014. The series is released in visual novel format on the Adobe AIR platform, and takes place in a different universe than the game series.

=== Plush production line ===
On 3 November 2015, Erick Scarecrow of Esc-Toy Ltd. launched an official Kickstarter campaign, together with Hato Moa and Devolver Digital, with a set goal of $25,000 to create a production line of three characters from the Hatoful Boyfriend universe, namely, Shuu, Ryouta and Okosan. During the campaign, all stretch goals were reached, the last ending at $75,000, adding seven more characters to the production line. The campaign ended on 6 December 2015, with a total of $145,015 pledged by 2,514 backers.

Another official campaign was launched a year later featuring a second series of characters manufactured as limited edition plush. The $50,000 goal was met by 459 backers whom altogether pledged a total of $54,455 by the campaigns end on 6 December 2016.

== Reception ==
Reception

Aggregate score
Aggregator	Score
Metacritic	PC: 68/100; PS4: 72/100

Review scores
Publication	Score
Destructoid	6.5/10
Hardcore Gamer	1.5/5
IGN	8/10
Joystiq	7/10
PC Gamer (US)	7/10
Polygon	8/10
The Guardian	8/10
TouchArcade	iOS: 5/5

As a dōjin soft title, Hatoful Boyfriend was created on a limited budget and had even more limited promotion; however, due to strong word of mouth on Twitter and other social media Hatoful has enjoyed a degree of commercial success, especially considering its minimal production costs—with Mado no Mori reporting that the game was a "popular title" whose physical CD-ROM copies "consistently sold out at dōjin markets and wherever it became available for purchase", and 4Gamer.net noting that the game disk was difficult to purchase due to overwhelming demand. Outside Japan, where it is only available by download, the English release of the game is dōjin soft distributor DLsite English's best-selling title with 7,000 separate purchases as of 2014.

Hatoful Boyfriend has received generally favorable reception, with reviewers focusing on the surprising depth of the game's writing and storyline. In a weekly game spotlight, Kouichi Kirishima from Mado no Mori recommends the game to "not just pigeon-lovers, but anyone who enjoys visual novels", remarking that the game is "at times surprisingly serious and emotionally involved". On the other side of the Pacific, Julian Murdoch comments in a Gamers With Jobs analysis of the game that the scenarios featured in Hatoful are "elaborate and multifaceted", and that Hato Moa herself "isn't just a storyteller, she's actually a good storyteller". Hatoful Boyfriend was also named the best PC game of 2012 by GameCola; Paul Franzen explains the game's inclusion among higher budget and more technically sophisticated titles as being due to the strength of its storytelling and pathos, stating that "Hatoful Boyfriend isn't just a weird game about heathen human-animal relationships [...] there's an actual, serious, emotional game here, too". In an article discussing the E3 announcement of the 2014 remake, Carly Smith for The Escapist remarks that Hatoful Boyfriend is "absolutely hilarious", but recommends that players "start the game for a laugh, but stick with it for a ride you wouldn't have expected by looking at the cover".

Reviewers also praised the game's varied scenarios and replayability. Dora from Jay Is Games praised the game, saying that "with a huge amount of replay value, creativity to burn, and some of the most shocking plot lines you could ever hope to encounter, Hatoful Boyfriend is a fascinating and surprising text adventure well worth checking out", though she also observes that "the delayed payoff and the abruptness of some of the endings combined with the oddball concept may not appeal to every fan of the visual novel genre". Alexa Ray Corriea's Polygon review of the remake gave it an 8 out of 10, concluding that the "witty dialogue and absolutely bonkers scenarios are genuinely fun to discover, and the handful of different storylines make repeated playthroughs worthwhile". Some critics however expressed concerns over the presence of some repetitive aspects of gameplay—noted as being especially apparent when attempting multiple playthroughs—as well as the accessibility of the game's Bad Boys Love scenario to casual players: in his review of the remake for PC Gamer, Julian Murdoch states that "I suspect few will have the patience to ride the fast forward button and suss out the romantic proclivities of each cast member to get to the extended ending—really a second half—of the game".

Much attention was drawn to Hatoful Boyfriend's surreal concept in both its native Japan as well as overseas. Mentions of the game's "bird romance" spread through Japanese social media, leading several news agencies and publications to report on Hatoful and the "newness" of its premise. As translations began to make the game accessible to an English speaking audience, western media reacted similarly: Alec Meer for Rock, Paper, Shotgun commented on Hatoful's premise, citing it as being "reason enough to play it"; also for Rock, Paper, Shotgun, Craig Pearson stated that the game "could only be better if it was a secret game from Valve and BioWare". One of the main spurs to the game's popularity was a playthrough recorded by Angie Gallant on the Quarter to Three forums. In a retrospect, Jeffrey Matulef for Eurogamer remarks that Hatoful Boyfriend's "outlandish premise caught on and the English speaking world demanded it not be left out of this surreal creation", while Robert Fenner of RPGFan compared it favorably to Hiroki Azuma's writings on database consumption, praising the game as a "fierce deconstruction as well as a tender celebration of dating sims". Several Japanese commentators have also noted the game's overseas success, especially following the E3 announcement of the remake by British developer Mediatonic and American publisher Devolver Digital.

== Legacy ==
A sequel titled Hatoful Boyfriend: Holiday Star, was released in Japan on 29 December 2011, with an official English patch being released a year later on Christmas Day. The game is an episodic followup set around the holiday season and takes place in a separate universe from the first game, in which the events of Bad Boys Love do not occur. On 8 December 2015, it was announced that a remake would be released on 15 December 2015 for Microsoft Windows, OS X and Linux, and on 22 December 2015 for PlayStation 4 and PlayStation Vita.

In 2018, Hato Moa made a blog post announcing the development of a third Hatoful game, titled Hatoful Boyfriend: MIRROR. This game would be set in an alternate universe where most of the main characters are alive, and where the events of the preceding two games did not occur. As of August, 2019, the game was still in development.

== See also ==
- Raptor Boyfriend
