= Philip Dulhunty =

Australian aviator, power distribution entrepreneur, and inventor

Philip Wellesley Dulhunty, OAM (27 April 1924 - 29 November 2020) was an Australian aviator, power distribution entrepreneur and inventor. He invented the widely-adopted "dogbone" damper for the protection of overhead power lines and produced the world's first battery-powered laptop computer. He was chairman of the Australian National Committee of the Conseil International des Grands Réseaux Électriques (CIGRÉ) and a member of its international administrative council and executive committee. He formed the Seaplane Pilots Association of Australia in 1972 and was its chairman for 44 years.

== Early life ==
Dulhunty was born in Kempsey, New South Wales, in 1924, great-grandson to Robert Venour Dulhunty, the first white settler of what was to become the city of Dubbo, New South Wales. He was one of five children born to Robert Dulhunty and Phyllis. At age six, the family moved to Port Macquarie where Dulhunty left school after completing his Form Three Intermediate Exam, no higher school tuition being available in Port Macquarie at the time.

== Military career ==
In the Battle of the Coral Sea, he was with the 16th Heavy Anti-Aircraft Battery at Mount St John, Garbutt Field, Townsville at No 393 Gun site, then 8th Brigade Intelligence section in Wewak / Kokoda, then 34 Brigade HQ I section, British Commonwealth Occupation Force (BCOF), Hiroshima.

== Aviation ==
After returning from service with the armed forces in Japan, Dulhunty, in partnership with his younger brother Roger, inaugurated flying services to the northern New South Wales town of Port Macquarie in 1949, operating several Short S25 Sunderland MKIII flying boats leased from Trans Oceanic Airways under the banner of Port Macquarie Clipper, from Rose Bay in Sydney. The £4.18s.6d 75-minute service obviated travelling by poor gravel road or spending 10 hours on a train journey.

== Dogbone damper ==
Stockbridge dampers, invented and patented in the 1920s by George H. Stockbridge, an engineer for Southern California Edison, contributed greatly to the durability of overhead cables in conditions giving rise to Aeolian vibration. Failures were still common, particularly in the great featureless expanses of the Australian landscape, and Dulhunty was inspired to invent the Dogbone damper in 1976. His innovation was to offset the weights sideways in order to introduce a third degree of freedom, twisting the damper cable in addition to bending it up and down. Additional intra-strand friction was created in the damper cable, dissipating significantly more energy. The design configuration, a larger metal sphere attached to the end of the damper, with a smaller sphere projecting sideways from it, resembled a dog's bone. His work on Aeolian vibration on the Overhead Lines Study Committee of CIGRÉ, of which he is a life member and considered a driving force, was reflected in the council's 1982 task force report of which he was the lead author. The design was adopted worldwide and sold in the millions.

== Marine inventions ==
=== Aqueon ===
Dulhunty grew up in Port Macquarie where he was a keen swimmer and won the North Coast Junior Open Surf Race in 1940. Having experimented with his own swimming action, he worked together with Calvin A Gongwer to devise the "Aqueon", a winged contraption configured to cause the swimmer's legs to operate in unison, delivering power in the manner of a dolphin's kick. He claimed it had a propulsion efficiency of 86 per cent, as compared to 25 per cent for the average swimmer.

=== Flook anchor ===
In 1986, Dulhunty designed the "Flook", an automatically setting flying anchor. The device automatically adopts the correct angle on the bottom, obviating the necessity for sailors to make the often difficult estimation of depth and length of line to pay out. The Flook was designed to adopt a 5:1 flying angle when deployed. It was patented and sold successfully in Japan and the US.

== World's first laptop ==
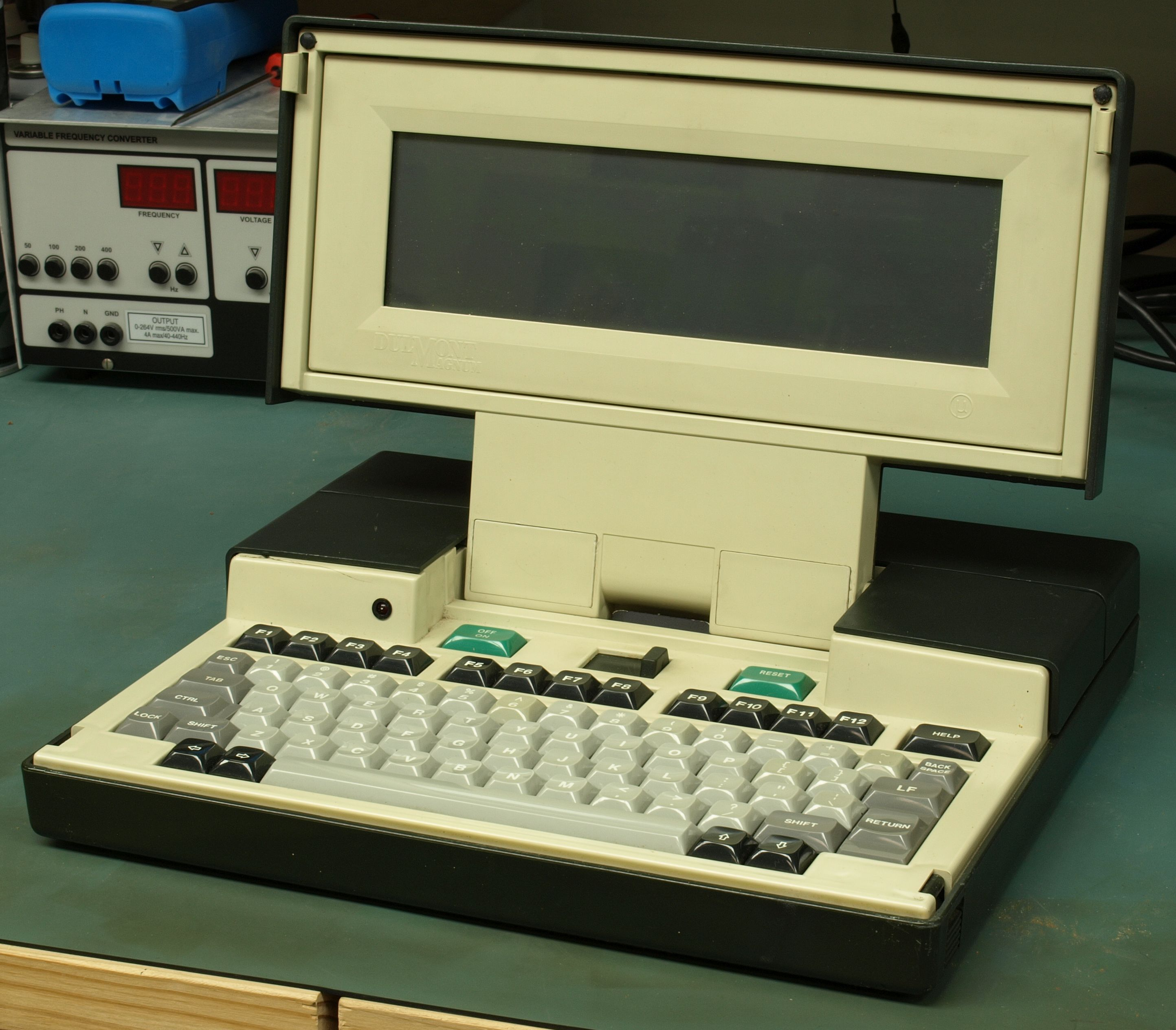
Dulmont Magnum (later, Kookaburra) Laptop PC

Dulhunty established Dulmison Pty Ltd in 1947 to exploit importing opportunities in the strictly controlled, quota and foreign exchange limited trading environment then prevailing in post-War Australia. After opportunistically trading in whatever available quota presented itself (e.g. fireworks, costume jewellery, calico and case shooks), Dulmison settled into the power distribution components business in which it became a leading player in Australia for decades. Having successfully developed a portable testing set for recording Aeolian vibrations in the 1970s, Dulhunty decided to commit Dulmison to developing a highly compact personal computer when his right-hand man Clive Mackness supported the idea. Al Westbury was transferred to lead the development programme, Dave Irwin to come up with the initial idea and design; the world's first true, battery-powered laptop computer, the Dulmont Magnum, which went into production in 1983, was the result. The product was marketed both domestically and internationally by a joint venture with Tramont Ltd, a subsidiary of the Belgian National Electricity Authority, one of Dulmison's customers.

== 1942 minisub attack ==
Having himself witnessed the heavy cruiser USS Chicago firing on the Japanese minisub M-24 in Sydney Harbour on 1 June 1942, Dulhunty developed a lifelong fascination with the event which culminated in publication of his forensic analysis in 2009 concluding that the sinking of HMAS Kuttabul during that encounter was not, as the official account would have it, to a torpedo fired by the Japanese submarine but, rather, a five-inch shell from one of the guns of the Chicago. Dulhunty's account attracted press interest at the time. Dulhunty was the pilot of the seaplane which re-enacted the 30 May 1992 Japanese reconnaissance flight which preceded the attack on its 50th anniversary and he was instrumental in the original Yokosuka E14Y1 "Glen" floatplane's rediscovery in 1994.

== Companies founded ==
Philip founded Dulmison, Dulmison Cables, Dulmison Ski Club, Pressure Impregnate Poles (PIP), Dulmison Aircraft, Greenwich Marine Electronics (GME), Greenwich Marine Corp, Linelec, Dulmont Magnum, Dulmison Marine, Modern Utilities, Sailboards Australia, Ocean Action, Seaplane Pilots Association of Australia (SPAA), Dulhunty Industries, Dulhunty Power, Dulhunty Poles, Jaspero, Philip Dulhunty Pty Ltd, Rophi, Eulamina, Markka Finance and Abuklea Estates. He also published Never A Dull Moment in 2009.

== Recognition ==
Dulhunty was awarded the Medal of the Order of Australia in 2004 for "service to international trade through the design, manufacture and export of equipment for large high voltage electric systems, and to aviation, particularly through the Seaplane Pilots Association of Australia."

In 2008, the Institution of Engineering and Technology (IET) conferred its James N Kirby Award on Dulhunty for "outstanding eminence, distinction, and public recognition".

Sir Richard Kingsland described Dulhunty as a "truly Renaissance man, and his contribution to the business and engineering life of post-war Australia ... astonishing."

In June 1986, Dulhunty's Dulmison UK Ltd received a Queen's Export Award in recognition of its successful exports of power-line equipment, particularly vibration dampers, from its plant in Corby, Northamptonshire.

== See also ==
- Magnum in Laptop History
