= PowerSwim =

Diver-powered propulsion device

The PowerSwim is a diver powered propulsion comprising two pairs of high aspect ratio hydrofoils in a device somewhat like two pairs of long thin airplane wings, one pair at each end of an axis. The axis is fastened to a scuba diver's shins by straps round the legs. The longer pair of wings (about 6 feet (1.8 m) wide or a bit less) is at the hips and the shorter pair is at the ankles. The wings rotate to a limited angle on axles near their front edges, and thus on upstroke and downstroke they propel water backwards. It is claimed that the length of the front wing lets it operate outside the cone of wake that starts at the diver's shoulders. It is claimed to let a scuba diver or swim much faster (250%) than with swimfins for the same amount of bodily effort, if used correctly, and being not motorized, it makes no motor noise to be heard by hostile hydrophones, but noise would occur if the front wings are allowed to hit the diver's hips at end of upstroke. It works somewhat like a penguin's or turtle's front flippers. Its estimated cost is less than $500. The diver uses it by moving his legs up and down together, letting the knees bend and straighten.

It was developed by DARPA in 2007.

== Aqueon ==
Aqueon is or was a similar device to PowerSwim. California Institute of Technology graduate Calvin "Cal" Gongwer began work on improvements to human propulsion through water in the 1950s and established Innerspace Corporation, an aquatic propulsion company which specialized in submersible thrusters at the time.

In 1968, he met Australian inventor Philip Dulhunty and they collaborated on the design of the dual-winged "Aqueon" in 1968 and produced prototypes in Tasmanian oak. The diver held onto it by trapping it between his shins placed in two エ-shaped attachments. It was claimed to provide three times as much thrust as conventional swimming fins and up to six times as much power, and that from a stationary start, a swimmer covered 25 yards in 8.4 seconds using Aqueon, and that with an Aqueon a swimmer covered 1500 yards with scuba equipment in 24 minutes; the fastest time covered by the same diver with scuba equipment and fins was 44 minutes. The Aqueon was reportedly examined at length and during multiple "pool parties" at the Gongwer residence by DARPA scientists before they created the PowerSwim.
