= Dulmont Magnum =

Early laptop computer

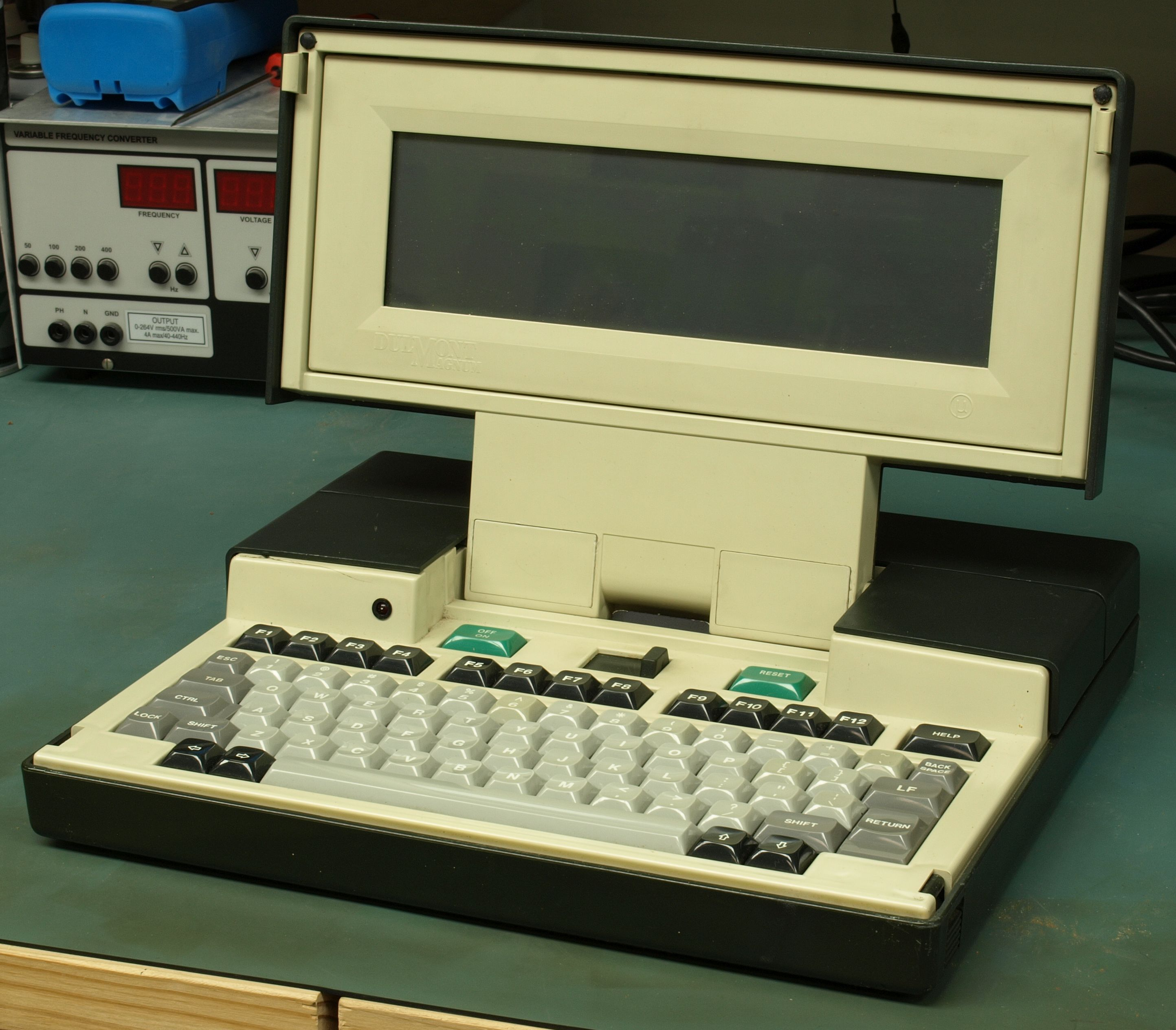
- Dulmont Magnum
- Also known as: Kookaburra
- Developer: Dulmison Pty Ltd
- Manufacturer: Dulmont Electronic Systems Pty Ltd
- Type: Portable computer
- Released: September 26, 1983 (Australia); 1983 (International)
- Discontinued: 1986
- Operating system: MS-DOS 2.11
- CPU: 8-MHz Intel 80186
- Memory: 96KB-384KB RAM, 128KB-384KB ROM
- Storage: Optionally External Dual 5.25" floppy disk drives, or an external 10 MB hard drive
- Removable storage: Dual 128K ROM cartridge slots
- Display: 8 lines, 80 characters LCD screen (1982–1983); 16 lines, 80 characters LCD screen (1984–1985 international release); 25 lines, 80 characters LCD screen (1985-6 final version); Earlier versions were able to be upgraded to the larger displays.
- Input: 76-key Keyboard
- Power: Battery; External mains power
- Dimensions: 32 x 27.5 x 5.5cm
- Weight: 4.8kg

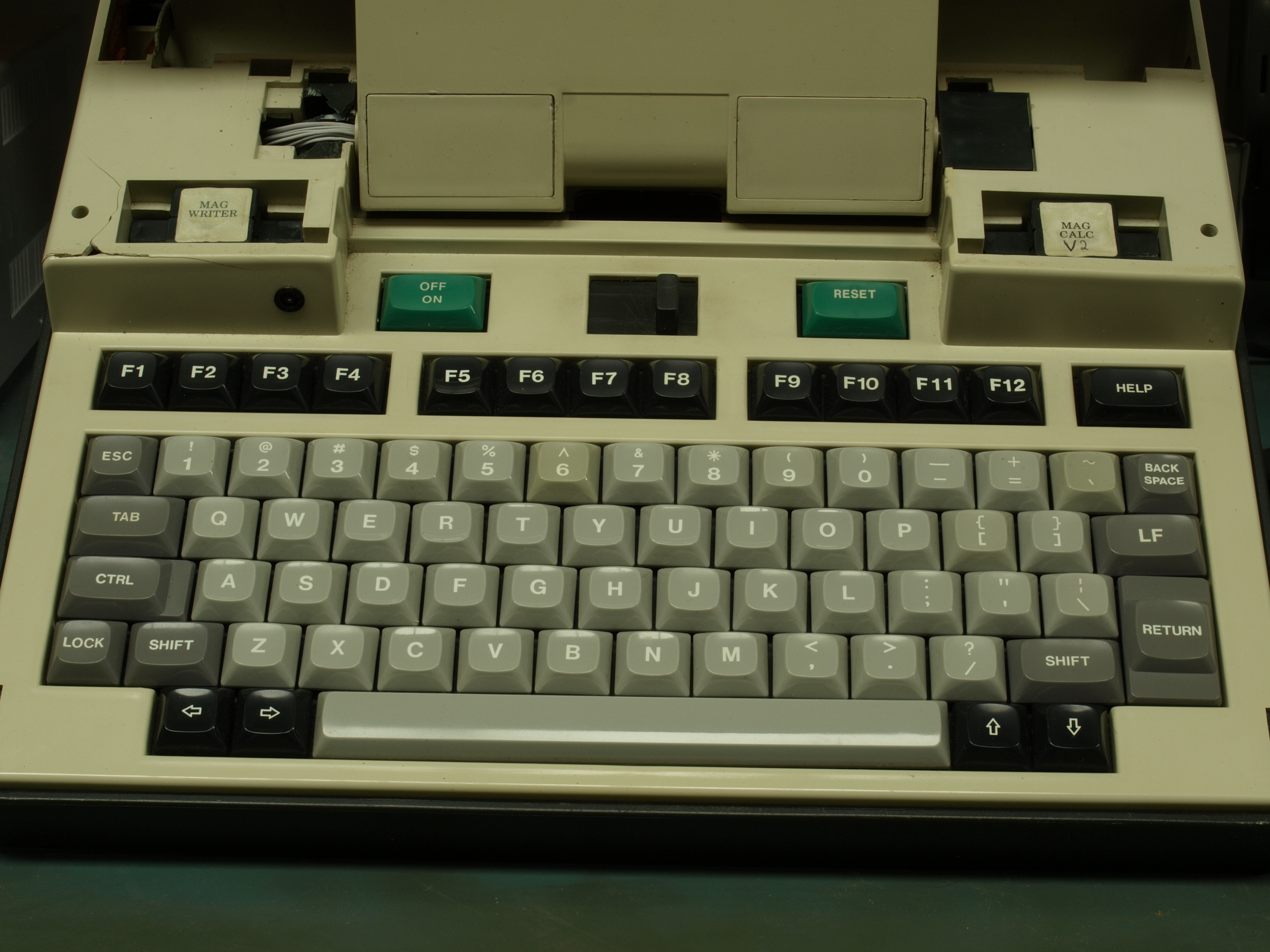
Dulmont Magnum Kookaburra Laptop PC Keyboard

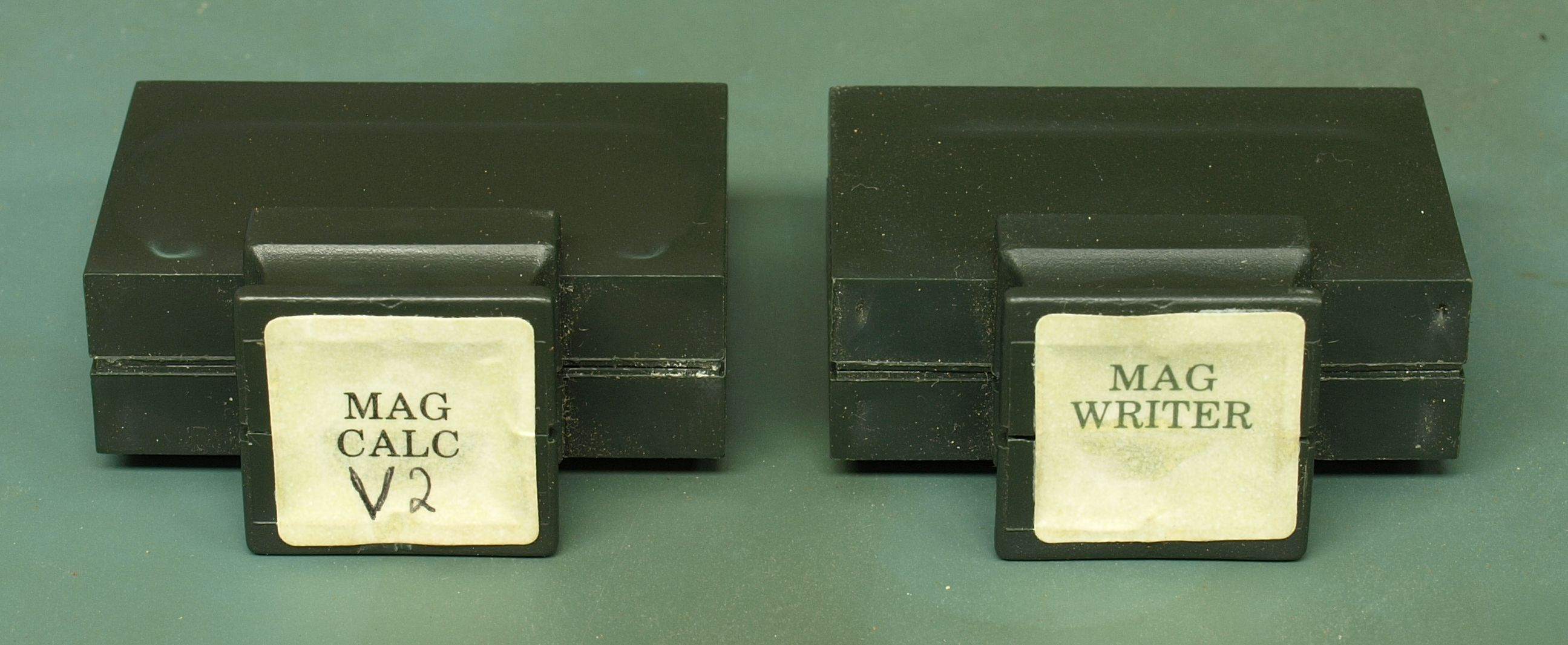
Dulmont Magnum Kookaburra Laptop PC Cartridges

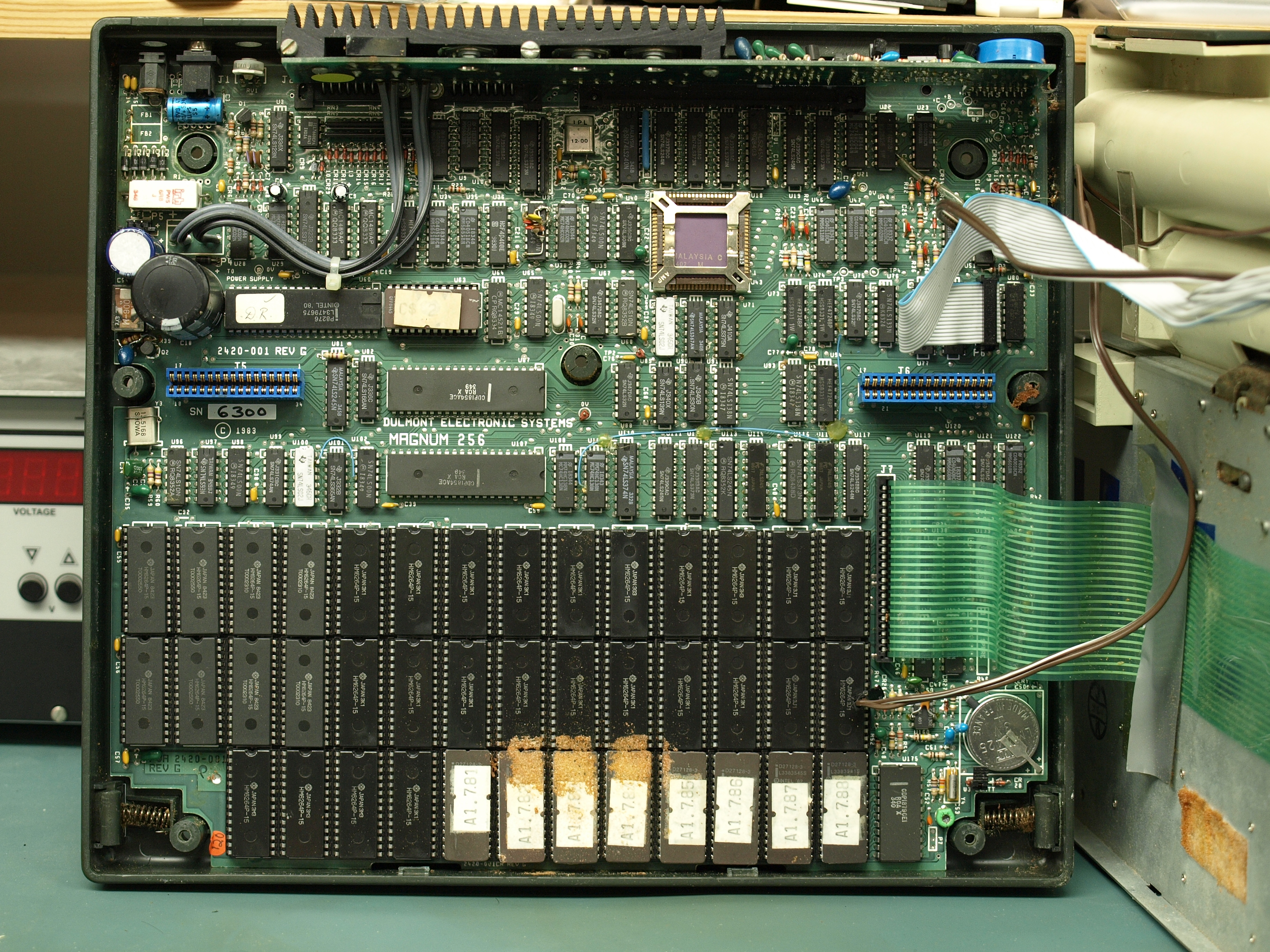
Dulmont Magnum Kookaburra Laptop PCB

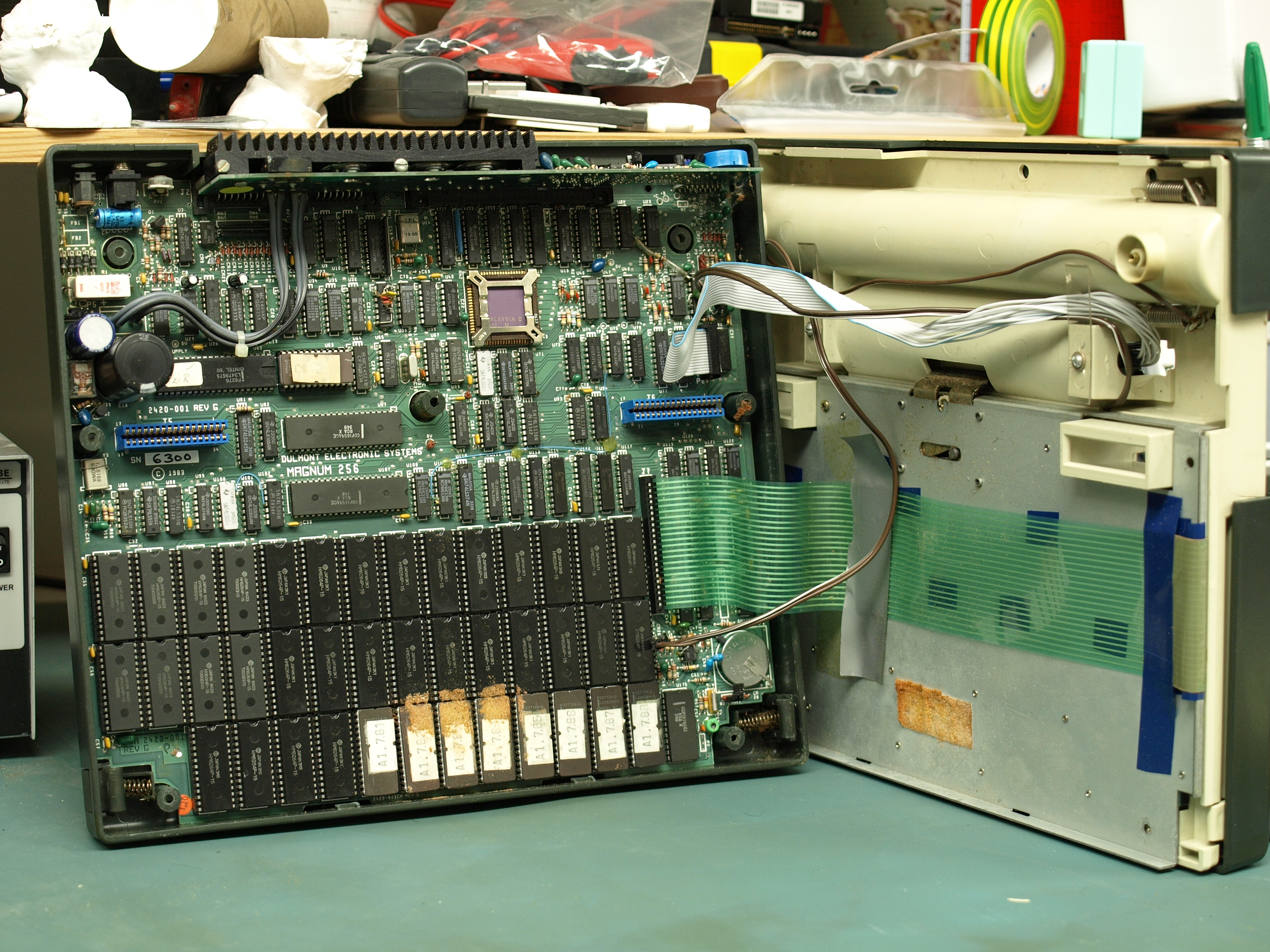
Dulmont Magnum Kookaburra Laptop PC Inside

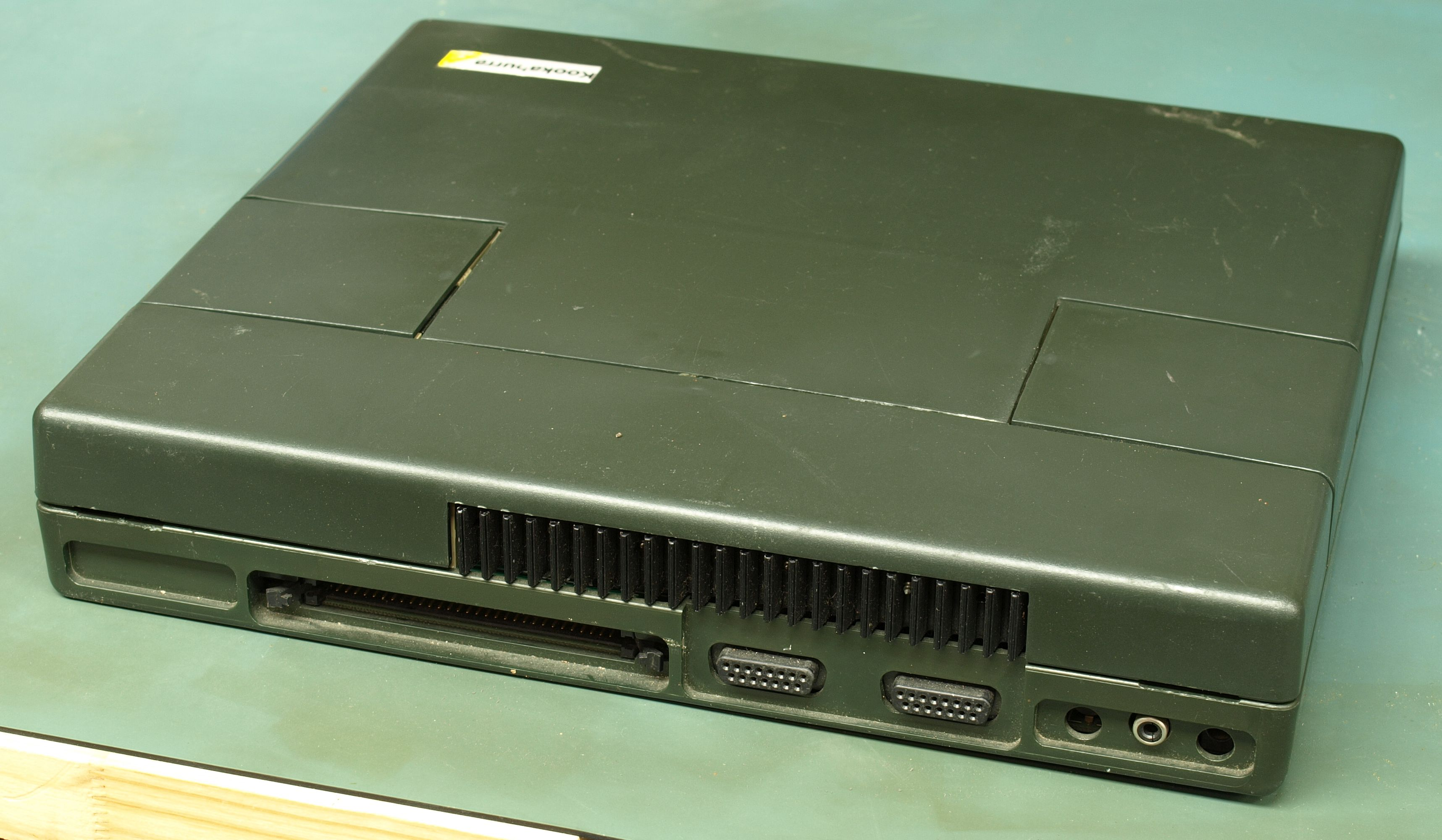
Dulmont Magnum Kookaburra Laptop PC Rear

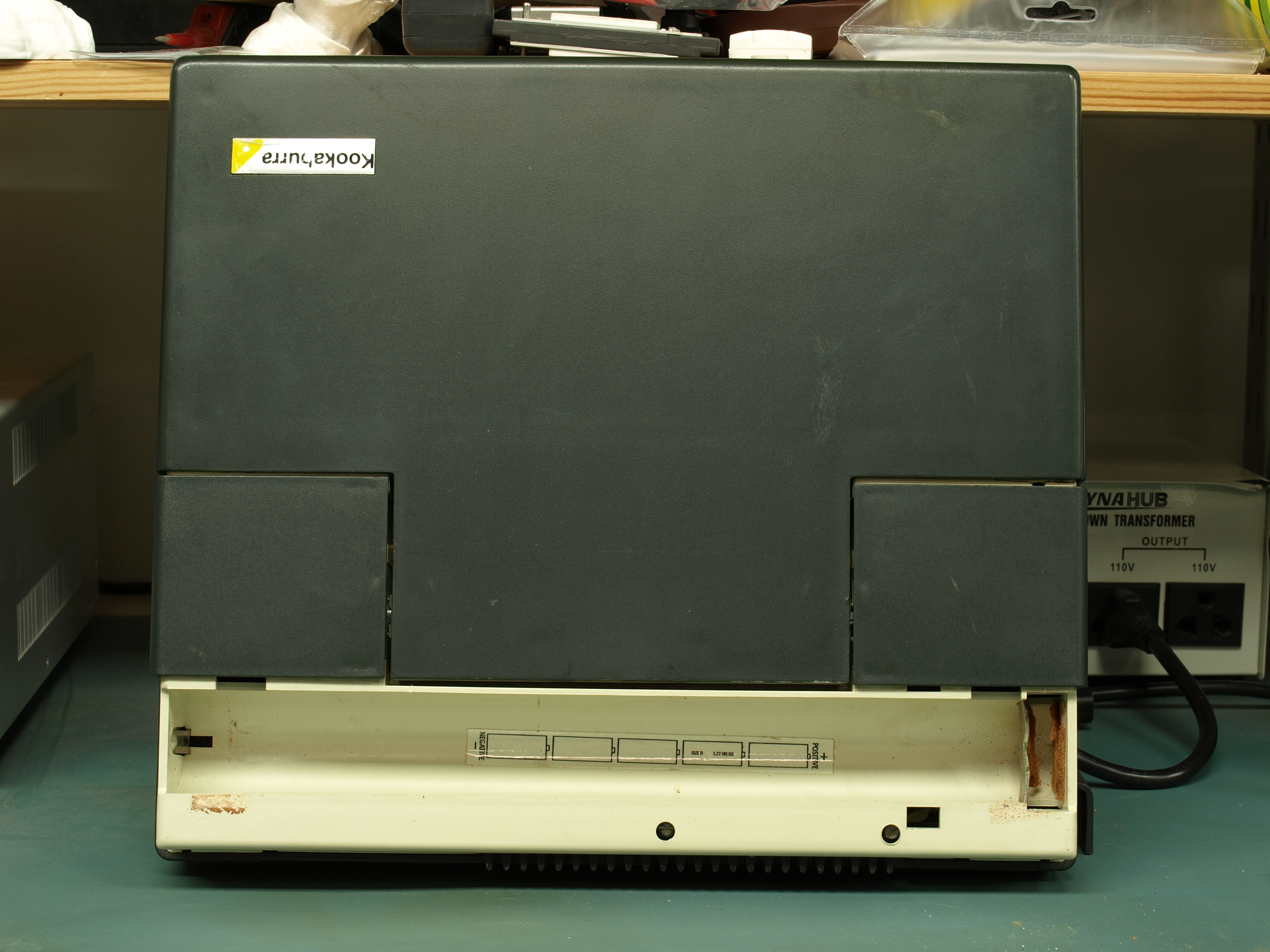
Dulmont Magnum Kookaburra Laptop PC Battery Compartment

The Dulmont Magnum is an early laptop computer designed initially by Australian power line equipment manufacturer Dulmison Pty Ltd and subsequently marketed by Dulmont Pty Ltd. Exhibited in September 1983, it was the world's first true battery-powered laptop computer.

Dulmont was a joint venture between Dulmison and an Australian subsidiary of their electrical utility customer the Belgian National Electricity Authority, Tramont Ltd. The Magnum was sold from 1983 to 1986. The company found itself undercapitalized as it sought to enter the international market and faced increased competition from other laptops. It was taken over twice, with Dulmont eventually taken over in 1984 by Time Office Computers (Manufacturing) Pty. Ltd.

== Development and promotion ==
The initial concept was a business card device hatched in 1981 by Clive Mackness. He was then no. 2 to owner Philip Dulhunty at Dulmison and assigned Dulmison freelancing engineer David Irwin the task of designing a product. A team was formed and spent several months working on feasibility.

Terry Crews was hired as engineering manager and created the concept of a laptop. The case was designed first and then electronics to fit into the form factor.

John Blair led the software engineering team. Development dragged on and the project was in danger of folding due to Dulmison's limited financial resources but was revitalised when Mackness secured a A$800,000 federal government grant.

The Magnum was to have been enabled by a custom power management integrated circuit that was to be developed in the VLSI and Systems Technology Laboratory at the University of New South Wales (UNSW) over 4 months in early 1982 by Graham Hellestrand. The ~10,000 transistor, 5μ nMOS technology chip, however, never saw the light of day.

The project's engineering manager did not believe that a custom chip would eventuate and contracted Barry Wilkinson to design the hardware based on discrete components. The form factor and cosmetic design was developed first and this then dictated the physical dimensions of the hardware. This was in contrast to the usual method of encasing the electronics as the last process and their subsequent bulkier designs.

The Dulmont joint venture having been formed in 1982 and with the benefit of a cash injection of about A$1.5 million from Tramont, the Magnum went into production. The project's marketing manager traveled the world showcasing the product. It attracted substantial interest and some large orders. The Magnum was marketed in Australia from 1983 to early 1986.

The Magnum was launched publicly at the 10th Australian Computer Conference on same day that Australia won the America's Cup in September 1983.

== Design and features ==
The Magnum was one of the first computers to use the 16-bit Intel 80186 processor, and was sold in versions with 96K to 256K of RAM, and inbuilt LCD screens from 8x80 to 25x80 characters. It had a word processor, spreadsheet, telecommunications, file manager, and appointment programs burned into ROM. It also featured dual 128K ROM cartridge slots, which could be used for optional software including BASIC or assembler programming support, as well as serial and parallel modem and printer ports. The 1982 to 1983 prerelease and initial release versions included an 8x80 character LCD screen, whilst the 1984 to 1985 international release had a 16x80 display, and the final 1985-6 version had a 25x80 display and for international marketing purposes was given the new name "Kookaburra". Earlier versions were able to be upgraded to the larger displays, and a dual 5.25" floppy drive and memory expansion box provided access to up to 256KB of dynamic RAM. Applications were stored in ROM (A:) and also supported removable modules in expansion slots (B: and C:) that could be custom programmed EPROM or standard word processing and spreadsheet applications. The Magnum could suspend and retain memory in CMOS battery-backed RAM (RAM Disk D:). There was even an expansion box providing 10MB of hard disk storage.

In 1985, the Magnum retailed for 2995 AU$ (today $9719.91) for a 96K model, or 4100 AU$ (today $13306.05) for a 256K model..

== Demise ==
Dulmont, a complete newcomer to electronics, let alone computer, manufacturing, suffered numerous production problems. The product had endemic faults and deliveries were delayed. The reputation of the product went from enthusiastic anticipation to disappointment.

The Magnum laptop computer was similar to the Hewlett-Packard HP 110 and the Sharp PC-5000 and is the only Australian produced laptop personal computer, but did not survive long on the international market once industry players like HP, Sharp and Sanyo entered the market. One key disadvantage of both the Dulmont Magnum [Kookaburra] and the Grid Compass is that they were developed prior to the IBM PC and were never upgraded to full IBM compatibility, using an early version of MS-DOS (latest version used was 2.11). A second disadvantage of the Magnum was the lack of integral permanent storage other than the ROM/EPROM that was available through the module cartridge slots, or the separate expansion box. In particular, its soon-to-arrive competitors (including the Grid Compass) made use of the new bubble memory technology to provide non-volatile memory.
