= Robert Dulhunty =

Early Australian settler (1803–1853)

Robert Venour Dulhunty (1803 – 30 December 1853) is chiefly remembered as being the first permanent white settler of what has since become the City of Dubbo, in the rural heartland of the Australian state of New South Wales.

== Early life ==
Robert Venour Dulhunty was born in the coastal township of Paignton, Devon, England, in 1803, to Dr John Dulhunty and Jane Smith. Jane was from West Country English stock and John's lineage was Irish in origin. The original Gaelic form of the name was O'Dulchaointigh and his forebears belonged to a sept of the O'Carroll clan situated in the province of Munster, Ireland.

== Arrival in Sydney and early activities ==
At the age of 21, Robert Dulhunty arrived in the Colony of New South Wales as a free settler on the ship Guildford. The date of his arrival was 5 March 1824. He was accompanied on the voyage from England by his brother, Lawrence Vance Dulhunty – a qualified surveyor with a sharp mind but a much less appealing manner than Robert's.

Sydney was just 36 years old at the time of the Dulhunty's arrival. It was still essentially a penal outpost operating under the decidedly non-democratic control of the then Governor of NSW, Sir Thomas Brisbane. The economy of NSW was based overwhelmingly on sheep grazing, other types of livestock production and the growing of various crops – with some additional income generated through whaling and sealing. Infrastructure projects were funded by the British Government and by the revenue reaped locally from taxes, including the collection of customs and excise duties levied on alcoholic spirits, tobacco and a wide range of imported goods. The colony possessed only a comparatively small contingent of skilled artisans, so convict iron-gangs were used perforce to build such necessary structures as roads, drains, bridges, wharves and fortifications, as well as public buildings of all kinds. Convicts quarried stone, too, and made bricks, felled trees and cleared paddocks. The more trustworthy of them were also assigned by the government to private landholders to work as agrarian labourers, shepherds or domestic servants.

On 23 March 1824, Robert Dulhunty applied for a grant of Crown land. This was at a time when the colony's hinterland was being opened up increasingly to responsible citizens for farming and grazing purposes. The governor accordingly granted him legal title to 2000 acres (eight km^{2}) of land which he had selected previously at Cullen Bullen. In addition, Dulhunty was allocated six convict servants/labourers who were to assist him with the task of making the property a viable enterprise.

In 1826, Robert's father Dr John Dulhunty settled with his wife on a parcel of rural land at Burwood, which was situated 12 kilometres west of the port's mercantile and governmental core. Two years later, Dr Dulhunty was appointed to the salaried position of Superintendent of Police by the Governor of NSW. The governor had been impressed by the cool-headed bravery that he displayed when bushrangers attacked his residence, Burwood House. Dr Dulhunty's health declined unexpectedly in the wake of his police appointment, however, and he died at Burwood House in 1828.

Robert Dulhunty's land grant marked the beginning of his rise through the ranks of colonial society. On 4 July 1828, Dulhunty requested a ticket of occupation from the NSW Surveyor-General, Sir Thomas Mitchell. He was rather brusquely informed by Sir Thomas on 10 July that the government had, for some time, discontinued giving tickets of occupation. Sir Thomas, however, would become a friend of Dulhunty's in the coming years.

By the end of the 1820s, Dulhunty was living mainly at Claremont House in the Mulgoa Valley, not far from the Nepean River. Sometime between 1829 and 1833, he set out from the nearby township of Penrith with an escort of about 40 Aborigines. Crossing the rugged Great Dividing Range, he followed the Macquarie River down to what is now known as Dubbo. This area had not been occupied by any Europeans when the explorer Captain Charles Sturt traversed the Macquarie in 1829.

When surveyor Robert Dixon passed through Dubbo to survey the Bogan River in 1833, he mentioned that he had borrowed a dray from Dulhunty. It is therefore believed that Dulhunty took up the land which he named "Dubbo" in 1832.

Governor Sir Ralph Darling had created a zone known as the "limits of location" on 5 September 1826. Settlers were only allowed to take up land within this zone. A further government order, issued on 14 October 1829, increased the zone of approved settlement so that it now included an area called the 'Nineteen Counties'. Anyone who occupied land outside of this area were technically considered to be a 'squatter', without legal title. Among these squatters were many of the leading citizens of the colony, including Dulhunty.

In 1836, Dulhunty was listed as a founding member of Sydney's elite Australian Club, the first meeting of which was held in October that year. The club's 86 members included such prominent citizens as W.C. Wentworth, Sir John Jamison, Captain John Piper, Dr William Bland, Major Edmund Lockyer, James Macarthur, William Lithgow and John Blaxland.

== Marriage ==
Dulhunty's marriage took place at the Anglican Church of St James, central Sydney, on 29 April 1837. His bride, Eliza Julia Gibbes (1811–1892), was the English-born eldest daughter of Major (later Colonel) John George Nathaniel Gibbes. Colonel Gibbes (1787–1873) was a Member of the NSW Legislative Council and the Collector of Customs for NSW – a vital revenue-raising task that he would perform for the colonial government from 1834 until 1859. (The Colonel was also reputed to be the bastard son of Frederick, Duke of York, the second son of King George III)

Dulhunty and his wife held their wedding party on Sydney's Point Piper, where the Gibbes family lived. They honeymooned, however, near Penrith, at a Georgian mansion known as Regentville House. The mansion belonged to Sir John Jamison and stood at the heart of the knight's showpiece agricultural estate on the Nepean River. Dulhunty and Sir John knew each other well and Mrs Dulhunty's younger brother, William John Gibbes, was about to marry Sir John's eldest daughter.

Not long after Dulhunty's wedding, he and Colonel Gibbes narrowly escaped being murdered by a pair of armed robbers while they were travelling in a carriage from the Sydney Customs House to a private engagement. Dulhunty was driving the carriage and their route took them along Parramatta Road. According to contemporary newspaper reports, when they reached a toll gate located near what is now the site of Sydney University they were ambushed by the two thugs, each of whom was brandishing a single-shot pistol. The thugs got angry when their victims refused to hand over their valuables and they made ready to shoot them. Luckily, however, it had been raining that afternoon, and the damp gunpowder in the thugs' pistols fizzled when the triggers were pulled. Dulhunty then slashed at the thugs with his horsewhip, and he and Colonel Gibbes were able to speed away to safety in their carriage. The police subsequently searched the area and interviewed informants but the perpetrators of the crime were never caught. Their appearance and distinctive way of speaking, as described by Dulhunty and Colonel Gibbes, led the investigating officers to conclude that they were English sailors who had probably come ashore from a ship moored in Blackwattle Bay.

== Family ==
Dulhunty and his wife, Eliza Julia Dulhunty (née Gibbes), had six sons and three daughters, the last three children being born in Dubbo. They were:

- Blanche Jane – birth date, 3 June 1838
- Marcus – 18 May 1840
- John Belmore – 1841
- Robert George – 1843 (father of Robert and grandfather of Philip Wellesley Dunhunty, OAM)
- Lawrence Joshua – 1844
- Alice – 1846
- Florence – 1848
- Hubert – 1849
- Alfred Murray – 1851

Another child, Emily, died as an infant in 1839 and lies buried at St Thomas' Churchyard, Mulgoa.

== Government appointments and later life ==
Dulhunty, on 5 December 1837, was made the police magistrate for the Penrith District. He also took out a licence for 'Dubbo Station' in that same year. On 10 December 1840, Dulhunty accepted an appointment to serve on the Committee of the Australian Immigration Association. During the early 1840s, Dulhunty – along with E. Blaxland and R.C. Lethbridge – served the Penrith District as a local councillor, with Dulhunty's brother-in-law, William John Gibbes, acting in his spare time as the district's equivalent of a town or shire clerk. Gibbes was now managing the Regentville estate for his father-in-law, Sir John Jamison, who was in poor health. Gibbes and Dulhunty became close friends during this time. They shared a love of books, good food and horse-riding, and they both accepted positions as honorary stewards at Sir John's private racecourse. When Sir John died in 1844, Dulhunty and Mrs Dulhunty attended his funeral in Penrith.

By 1839, 28 free men and 18 government-assigned male convicts had gone to work for Dulhunty on Dubbo station. Dulhunty"s reputation among the working men of the region was that of a fine bushman, a firm but fair-minded boss and an extremely able landed proprietor. Unlike some other squatters of this era, he rarely had his convict labourers flogged by their overseers when they transgressed.

Dulhunty reached the zenith of his wealth in 1839–1840, when he is listed as the owner of half-a-dozen big grazing properties throughout NSW. Unfortunately, however, a severe economic depression struck the colony in the early 1840s, costing him a significant amount of money and forcing him to shed numerous assets. This crisis lasted for several years. He survived it but many of his coevals in NSW did not, as wool prices fell, banks failed, investment schemes collapsed and bankruptcies soared.

Just before the depression hit, Dulhunty had erected a large, brick and timber homestead at Dubbo Station. Claremont, however, would remain his headquarters until 1847, in which year he decided to move permanently to Dubbo with his wife and children. This relocation proved to be an arduous logistical exercise for the Dulhuntys, who had to transport dray-loads of furniture and other belongings across rough mountain roads and along rutted bush tracks in sometimes hostile weather conditions.

In 1849, a village was laid out at Dubbo and gazetted as a residential and commercial settlement. Henceforth, Dulhunty's landed estate, situated nearby, would become known as "Old Dubbo". The following year, convict transportation to NSW ceased, while the discovery of gold in NSW and Victoria during the early 1850s would transform the hitherto agricultural-based economies of these two neighbouring colonies and help attract free immigrants to Australia in unprecedented numbers.

== Death ==
Robert Venour Dulhunty died on Friday, 30 December 1853, after suffering for three days from an illness that is not identified on his death certificate. His brick-lined grave lies in the Dubbo Pioneers' Cemetery, which is situated on former Dulhunty land amidst a patchwork of paddocks and enclaves of bush. He was aged only 51 at the time of his passing.

His widow Eliza, in addition to raising a family, maintained the Dulhunty property while facing droughts, floods, outbreaks of livestock diseases, bank foreclosures and various other setbacks. Those who knew her said she never lost her vibrant sense of humour, cultivated manners or deep interest in music and literature, no matter how serious the latest problem besetting her.

Mrs Dulhunty never remarried. During the 1870s, she lived with one of her sons, Hubert Dulhunty, on a small rural property near Wellington, New South Wales. Later, when she grew frail with age and was handicapped by deteriorating eyesight, she moved to the town of Bathurst. Here she was looked after by another of her sons – John, a commission agent.

Mrs Dulhunty died at Bathurst Hospital on 13 February 1892, having outlived her husband "Bob" by almost 40 years. The "Bulletin" magazine, which was read widely by people in rural areas, published a brief but sympathetic obituary when informed of her death. She is buried in Old Bathurst Cemetery. Her headstone is still extant and photographs of her exist. Regrettably, no image of Robert Venour Dulhunty has been traced.
