= History of laptops =

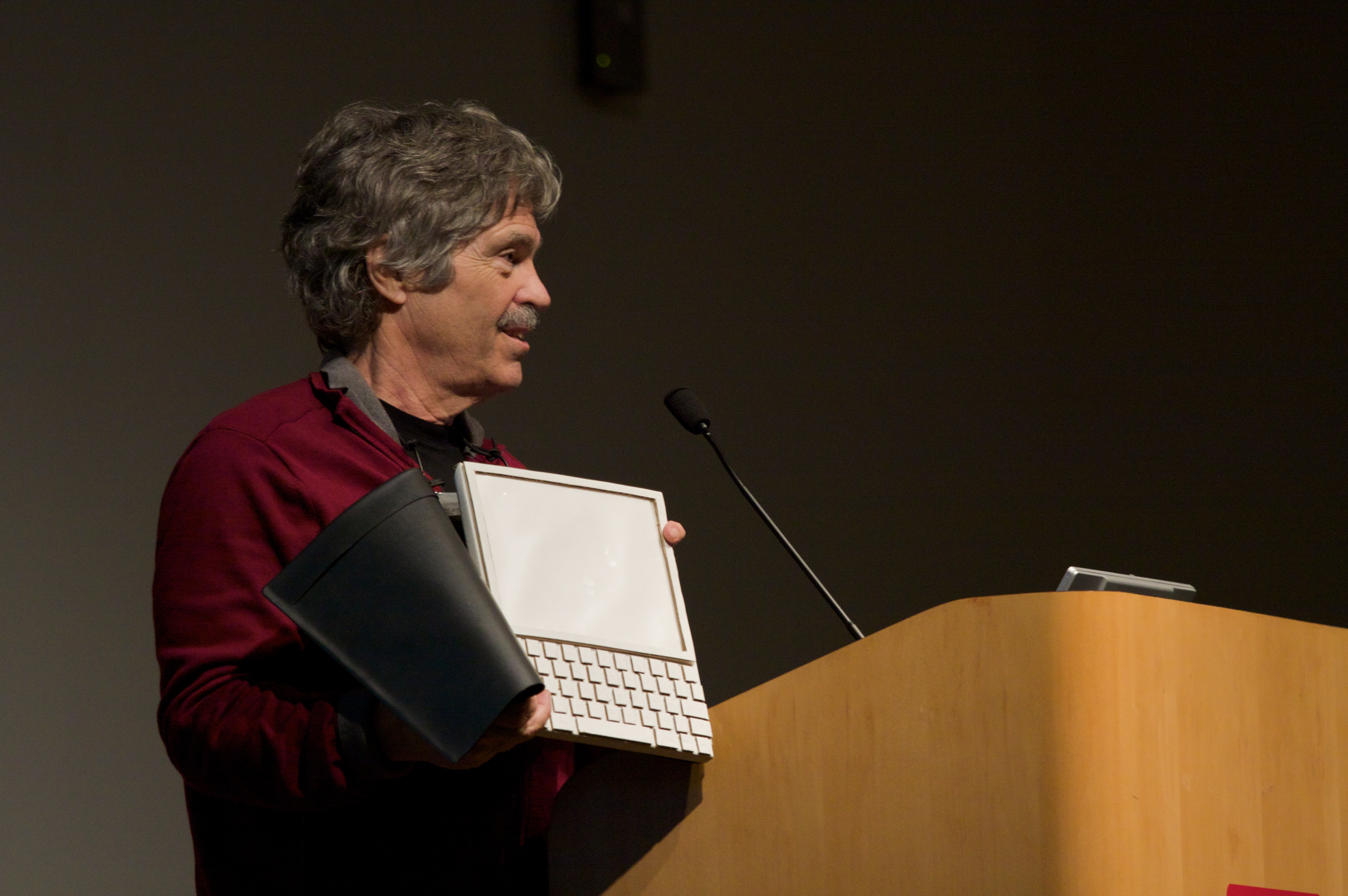
Alan Kay in 2008 with his 1972 Dynabook mockup

The history of laptops describes the efforts, begun in the 1970s, to build small, portable laptop computers that combine the components, inputs, outputs and capabilities of a desktop computer in a small chassis.

== Portable precursors ==
=== Portal R2E CCMC ===
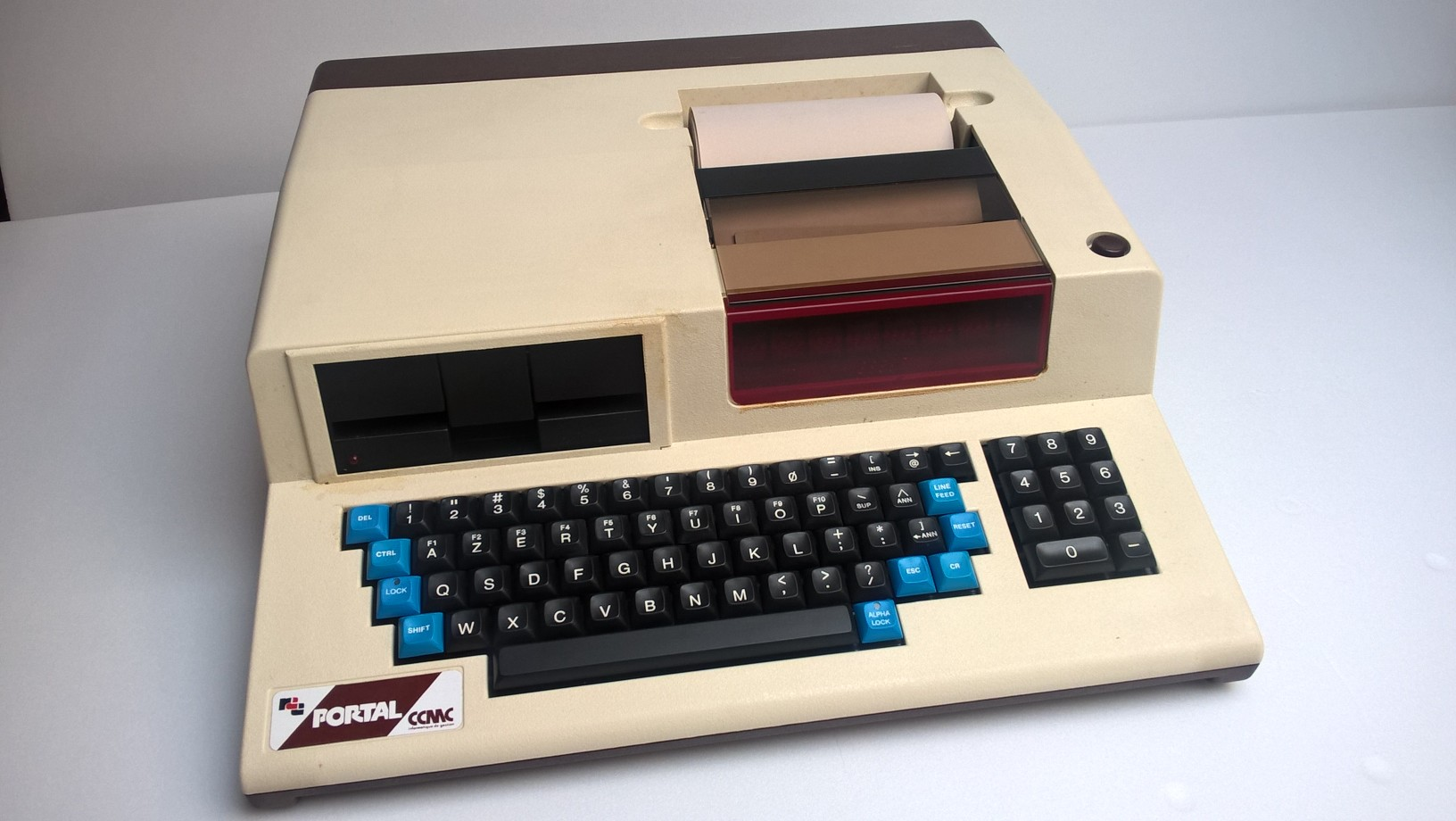
R2E CCMC Portal laptop

The portable microcomputer "Portal", of the French company R2E Micral CCMC, officially appeared in September 1980 at the Sicob show in Paris. The Portal was a portable microcomputer designed and marketed by the studies and developments department of the French firm R2E Micral in 1980 at the request of the company CCMC specializing in payroll and accounting. It was based on an Intel 8085 processor, 8-bit, clocked at 2 MHz. It was equipped with a central 64K byte RAM, a keyboard with 58 alphanumeric keys and 11 numeric keys (in separate blocks), a 32-character screen, a floppy disk (capacity - 140,000 characters), a thermal printer (speed - 28 characters/second), an asynchronous channel, a synchronous channel, and a 220-volt power supply. Designed for an operating temperature of 15–35 °C, it weighed 12 kg (26 lb) and its dimensions were 45 × 45 × 15 cm. It ran the Prologue (système d'exploitation) Operating System.

=== Osborne 1 ===
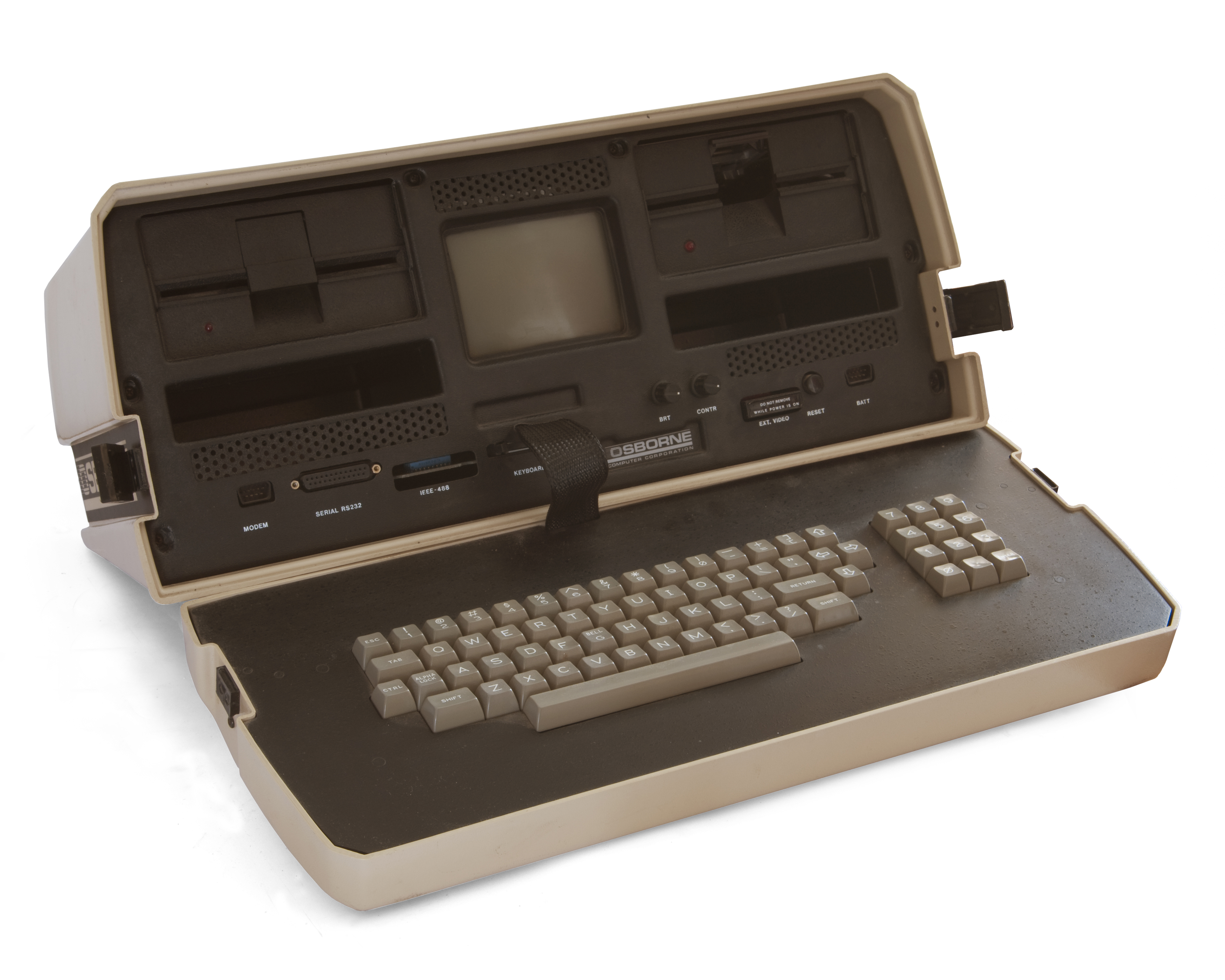
An opened Osborne 1 (1981)

The Osborne 1 is considered the first true mobile computer by most historians. Adam Osborne founded Osborne Computer and produced the Osborne 1 on April 3, 1981. The Osborne 1 had a five-inch screen, incorporating a modem port, two 5 1/4-inch floppy drives, and a large collection of bundled software applications. An aftermarket battery pack was available. The computer company was a failure and did not last for very long. Although it was large and heavy compared to today's laptops, with a tiny 5" CRT monitor, it had a near-revolutionary impact on business, as professionals were able to take their computer and data with them for the first time. This and other "luggables" were inspired by what was probably the first portable computer, the Xerox NoteTaker. The Osborne was about the size of a portable sewing machine, and could be carried on commercial aircraft. The Osborne 1 weighs close to 11 kg (24 lb) and was priced at US$1,795 (equivalent to $6,357 in 2025).

=== Compaq Portable ===
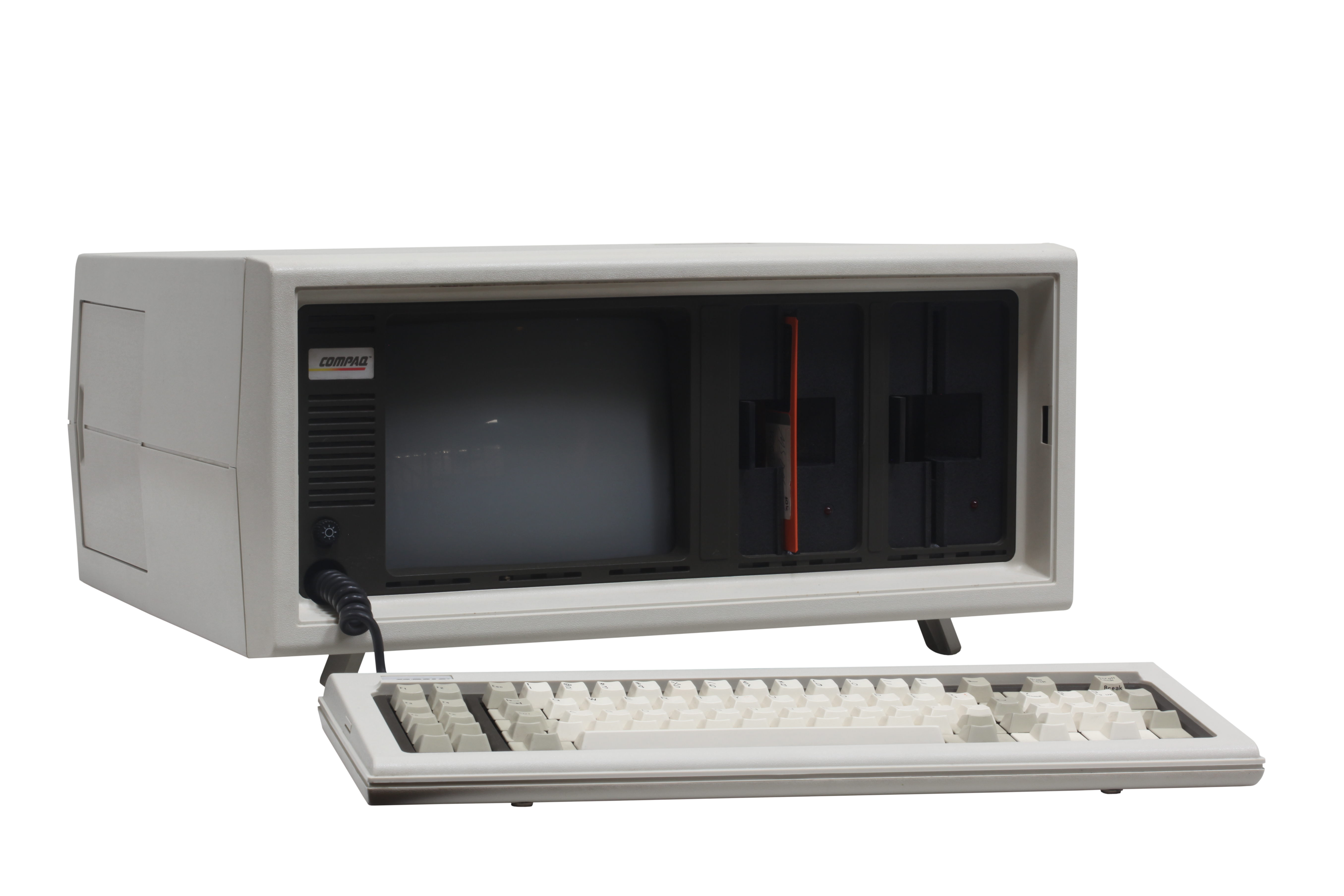
Compaq Portable (1983)

The Compaq Portable was the first PC-compatible portable computer created in 1982. The first shipment was in March 1983 and was priced at US$2,995 (equivalent to $9,992 in 2025). The Compaq Portable folded up into a luggable case the size of a portable sewing machine, similar in size to the Osborne 1. The third model of this development, Compaq Portable II, featured high resolution graphics on its tube display. It was the first portable computer ready to be used on the shop floor, and for CAD and diagram display. It established Compaq as a major brand on the market.

== Epson HX-20 ==
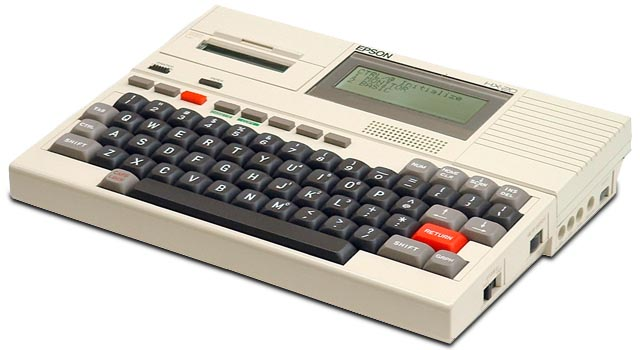
Epson HX-20 (1981)

The first significant development towards laptop computing was announced in 1981 and sold from July 1982, the 8/16-bit Epson HX-20. It featured a full-transit 68-key keyboard, rechargeable nickel-cadmium batteries, a small (120×32-pixel) dot-matrix LCD with 4 lines of text, 20 characters per line text mode, a 24 column dot matrix printer, a Microsoft BASIC interpreter, and 16 KB of RAM (expandable to 32 KB). The HX-20's very limited screen and tiny internal memory, made serious word-processing and spreadsheet applications impractical and the device was described as "primitive" by some. In terms of mass storage, the HX20 could be fitted with a Microcasette Drive, which is powered and operated by the Main Unit. External Floppy Drives and even an Adapter for CRT output were also available. The HX-20 was the first laptop to be called a notebook.

== Grid Compass ==
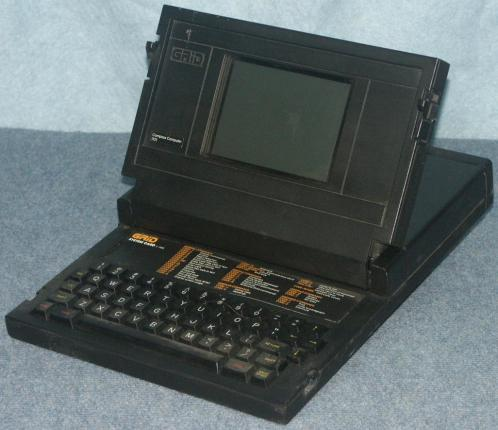
GRiD Compass 1101 (1982)

The first clamshell laptop, the Grid Compass, was made in 1982. Enclosed in a magnesium case, it introduced the now familiar design in which the flat display folded shut against the keyboard. The computer was equipped with a 320×200-pixel electroluminescent display and 384 kilobyte bubble memory. It was not IBM-compatible, and its high price (US$8,000–10,000, equivalent to $27,000-33,000 in 2025) limited it to specialized applications. However, it was used heavily by the U.S. military, and by NASA on the Space Shuttle during the 1980s. The GRiD's manufacturer subsequently earned significant returns on its patent rights as its innovations became commonplace. GRiD Systems Corp. was later bought by the Tandy (now RadioShack) Corporation. The Grid's portability was restricted as it had no internal battery pack and relied on mains power.

== Dulmont Magnum/Kookaburra ==
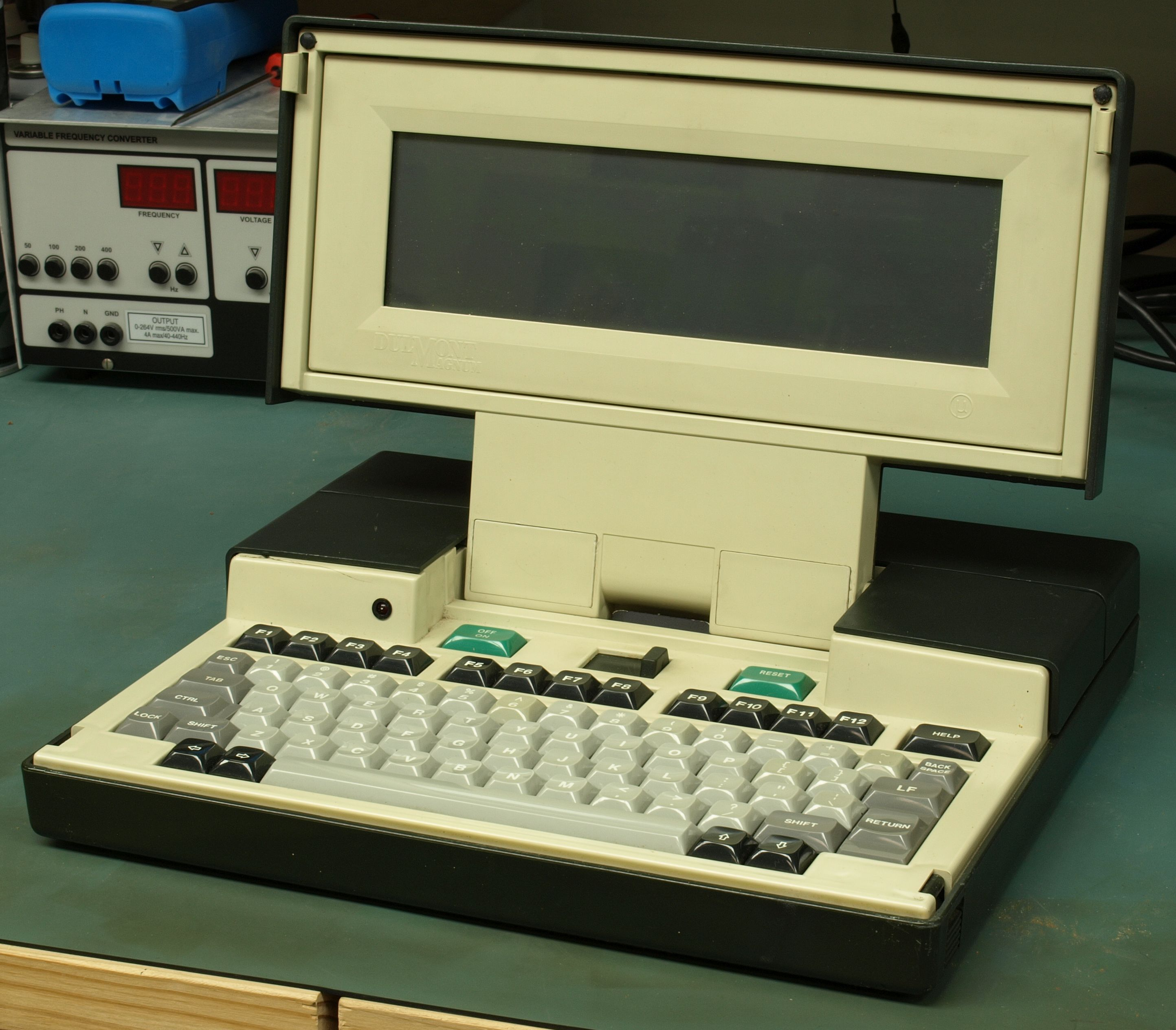
Dulmont Magnum (1982)

The first contender for true laptop computing was the 16-bit Dulmont Magnum, designed by David Irwin and John Blair of Dulmison, Australia, in 1982 and released in Australia in September 1983 by Dulmont. This battery-powered device included an 80 character × 8 line display in a lid that closed against the keyboard. The Dulmont was thus the first computer that could be taken anywhere and offered significant computing potential on the user's laptop (though weighing in at 4.8 kg (11 lb)). It was based on the MS-DOS operating system and applications stored in ROM (A:) and also supported removable modules in expansion slots (B: and C:) that could be custom-programmed EPROM or standard word processing and spreadsheet applications. The Magnum could suspend and retain memory in battery-backed CMOS RAM, including a RAM Disk (D:). A separate expansion box provided dual 5.25-inch floppy or 10 MB hard disk storage. The product was marketed internationally from 1984 to 1986. Dulmont was eventually taken over by Time Office Computers, who relabeled the brand "Kookaburra" and marketed 16- and 25-line LCD versions.

== Sharp and Gavilan ==
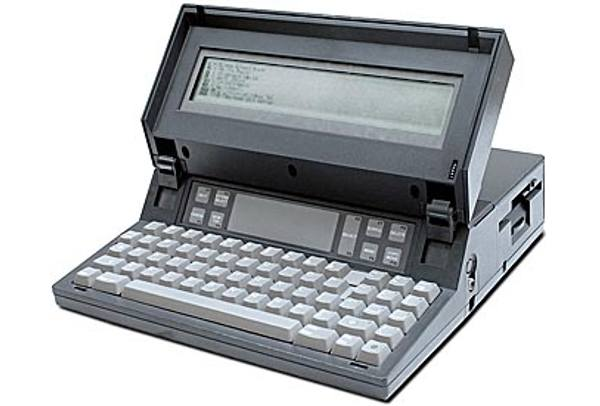
Gavilan SC (1983)

Two other noteworthy early laptops were the Sharp PC-5000 (similar in many respects to the Dulmont Magnum) and the Gavilan SC, announced in 1983 but first sold in 1984, Gavilan filing bankruptcy the same year. Both ran the 8/16-bit Intel 8088 CPU. The Gavilan was notably the first computer to be marketed as a "laptop". It was equipped with an internal floppy disk drive and a pioneering touchpad-like pointing device, installed on a panel above the keyboard. Like the GRiD Compass, the Gavilan and the Sharp were housed in clamshell cases, but they were partly IBM-compatible, although primarily running their own system software. Both had LCDs, and could connect to optional external printers.

== Kyotronic 85 (Tandy Model 100) ==
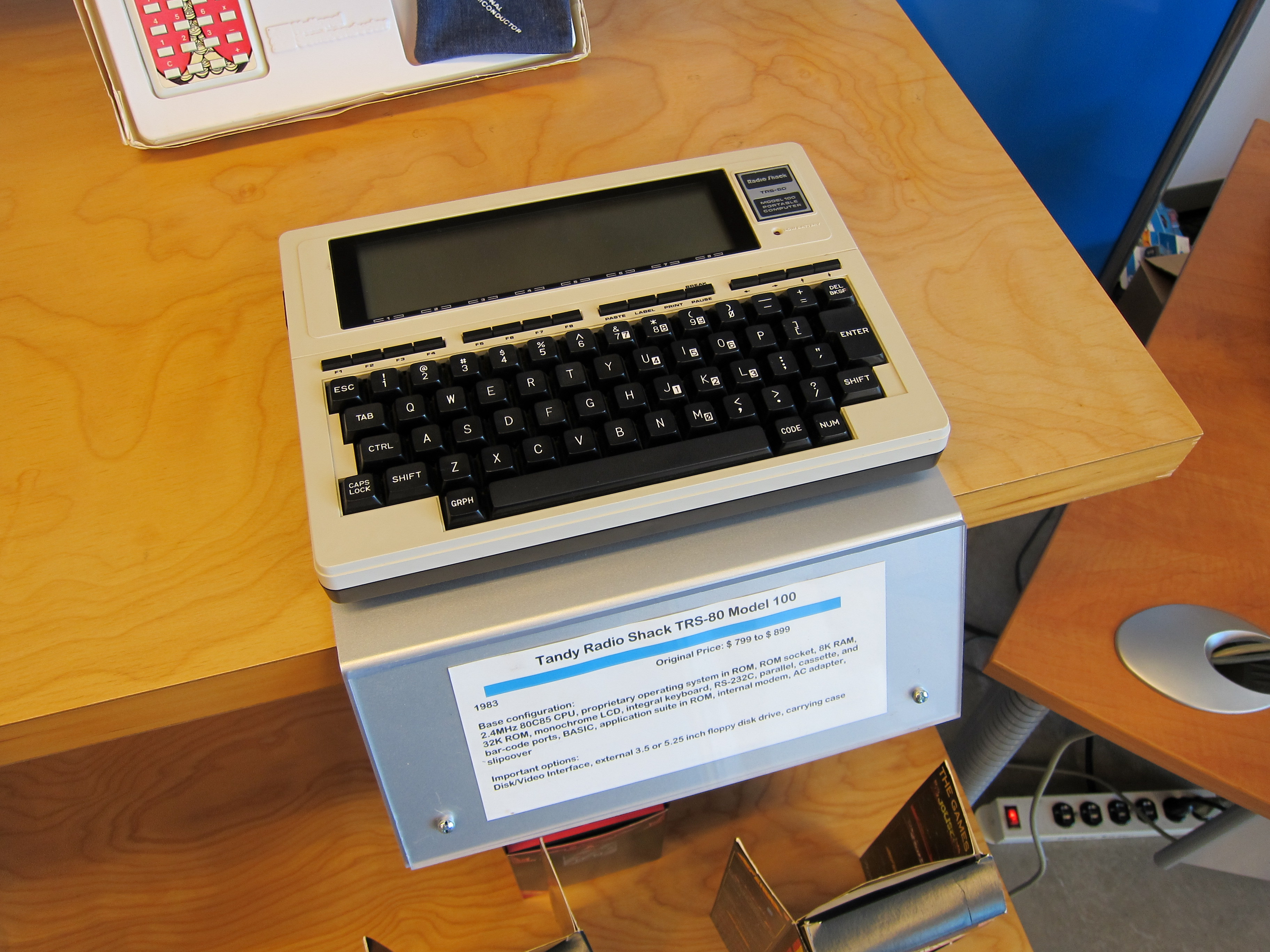
TRS-80 Model 100 (1983)

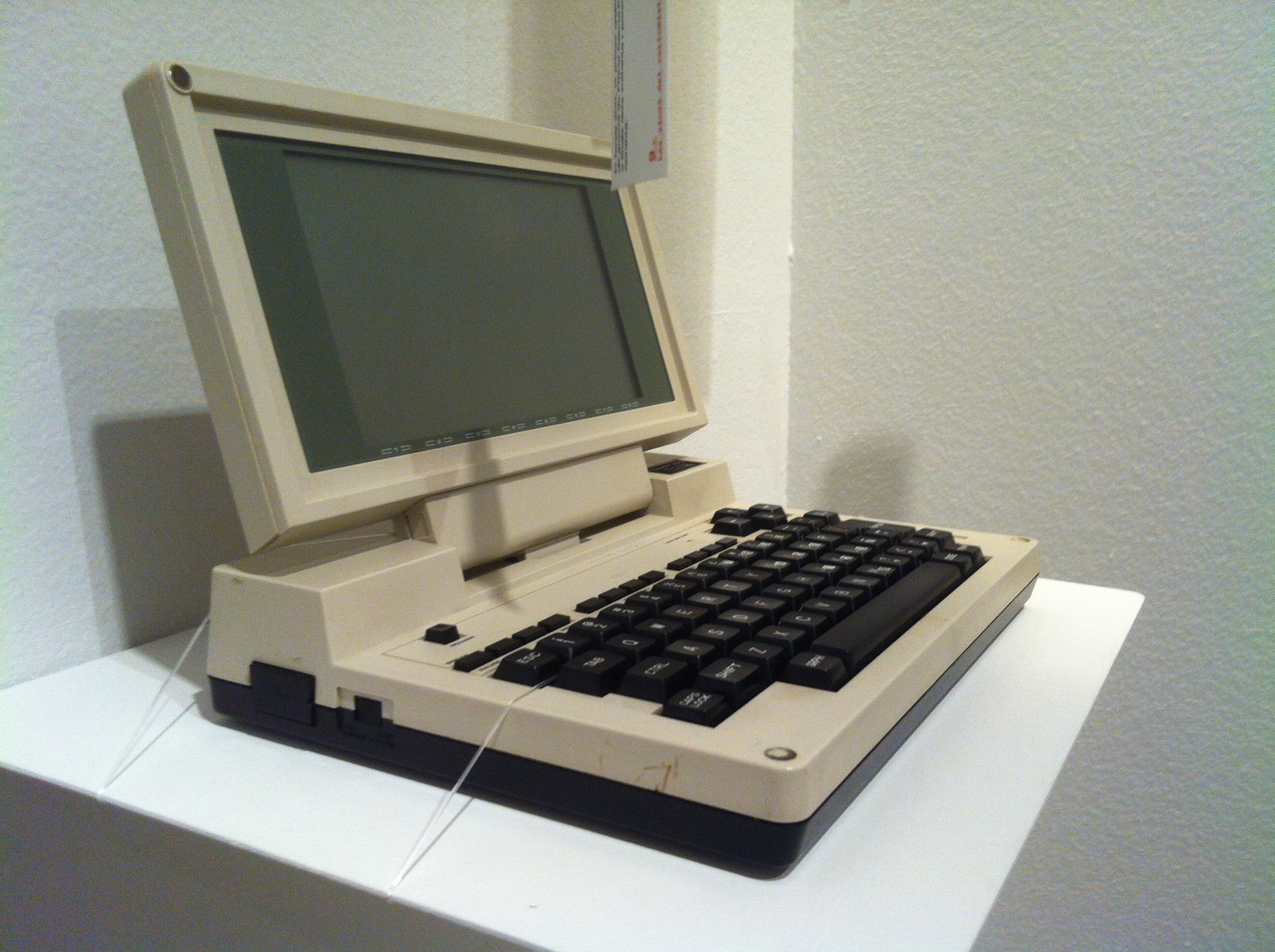
Tandy Model 200 (1984)

The year 1983 also saw the launch of what was probably the biggest-selling early laptop, the 8-bit Kyocera Kyotronic 85. Owing much to the design of the previous Epson HX-20, and although at first a slow seller in Japan, it was quickly licensed by Tandy Corporation, Olivetti, and NEC, who recognised its potential and marketed it respectively as the TRS-80 Model 100 line (or Tandy 100), Olivetti M-10, and NEC PC-8201. The machines ran on standard AA batteries.

The Tandy's built-in programs, including a BASIC interpreter, a text editor, and a terminal program, were supplied by Microsoft, and were written in part by Bill Gates. The computer was not a clamshell, but provided a tiltable 8 line × 40-character LCD screen above a full-travel keyboard. With its internal modem, it was a highly portable communications terminal. Due to its portability, good battery life (and ease of replacement), reliability (it had no moving parts), and low price (as little as US$300), the model was highly regarded, becoming a favorite among journalists. It weighed less than 2 kg (4.4 lb) with dimensions of 30×21.5×4.5 centimeters (12×8 1/2×1 3/4 in). Initial specifications included 8 kilobytes of RAM (expandable to 24 KB) and a 3 MHz processor. The machine was in fact about the size of a paper notebook, but the term had yet to come into use and it was generally described as a "portable" computer.

== Data General/One ==
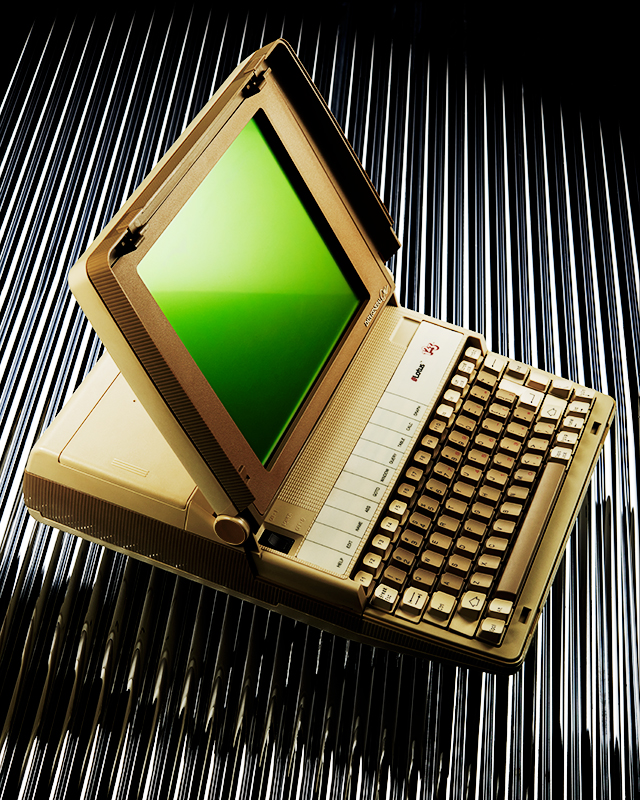
Data General/One (1984)

Data General's introduction of the Data General/One (DG-1) in 1984 is one of the few cases of a minicomputer company introducing a breakthrough PC product. Considered genuinely portable, rather than "luggable", it was a 9-pound (4.1 kg) battery-powered MS-DOS machine equipped with dual 3 1/2-inch diskettes, a 79-key full-stroke keyboard, 128 KB to 512 KB of RAM, and a monochrome LCD screen capable of either the full-sized standard 80×25 characters or full CGA graphics (640×200).

== Bondwell 2 ==
Although it was not released until 1985, well after the decline of CP/M as a major operating system, the Bondwell 2 is one of only a handful of CP/M laptops. It used an 8-bit Z80 CPU running at 4 MHz, had 64 KBs of RAM, and a 3 1/2-inch (89 mm) floppy disk drive built in, which was unusual for CP/M laptops. The flip-up LCDs resolution was 640x200 pixels. Bondwell 2 also included MicroPro's complete line of CP/M software, including WordStar. The Bondwell 2 was capable of displaying bitmapped graphics. The price of the Bondwell 2 was listed at $995.

== Kaypro 2000 ==
Possibly the first commercial IBM-compatible laptop was the 8/16-bit Kaypro 2000, introduced in 1985. With its brushed aluminum clamshell case, it was remarkably similar in design to modern laptops. It featured a 25 line by 80 character LCD, a detachable keyboard, and a pop-up 90 mm (3.5-inch) floppy drive.

== Toshiba T1100, T1000, and T1200 ==
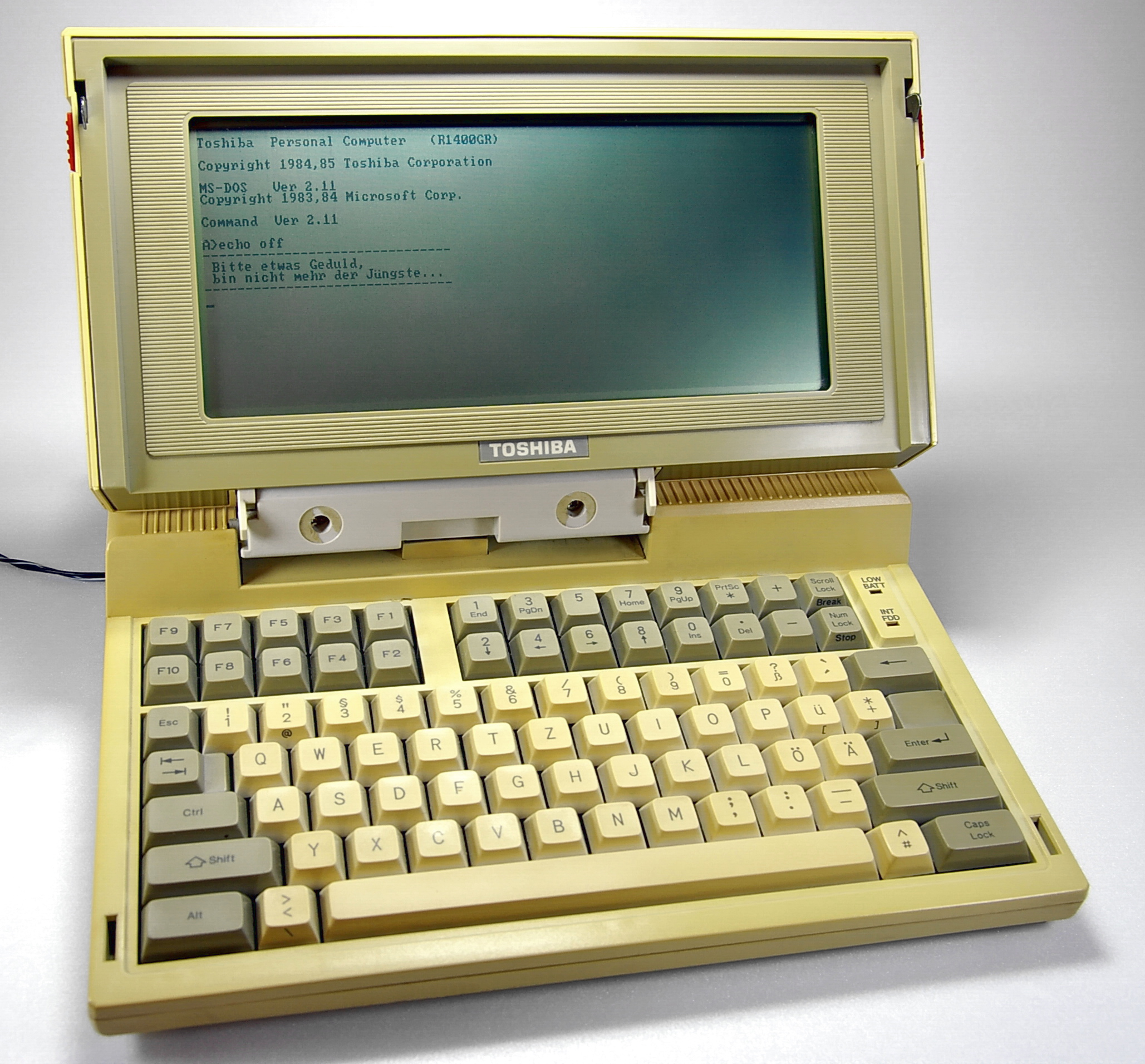
Toshiba T1100 (1985)

Toshiba launched the 8/16-bit Toshiba T1100 in 1985, and has subsequently described it as "the world's first mass-market laptop computer". It did not have a hard drive, and ran entirely from floppy disks. The CPU was a 4.77 MHz Intel 80C88, a lower-power-consumption variation of the popular Intel 8088, and the display was a monochrome, 640x200 LCD. It was followed in 1987 by the T1000 and T1200. Although limited floppy-based DOS machines, with the operating system stored in ROM on the T1000, the Toshiba models were small and light enough to be carried in a backpack, and could be run from Ni-Cd batteries. They also introduced the now-standard "resume" feature to DOS-based machines: the computer could be paused between sessions without having to be restarted each time. In 1990, Toshiba launched the Toshiba T3200SXC that was "the world's first laptop computer with colour display".

== IBM PC Convertible ==
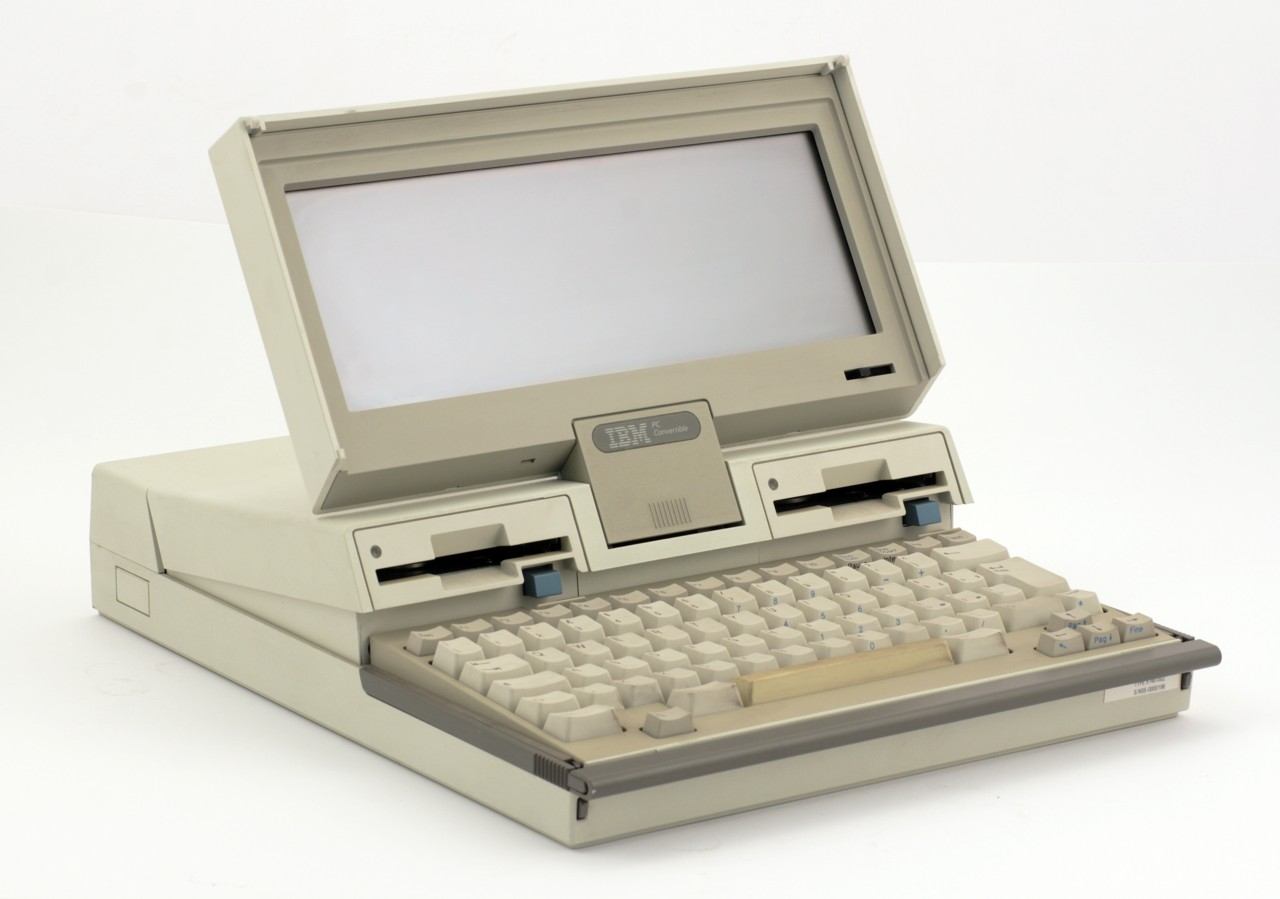
IBM PC Convertible (1986)

Also among the first commercial laptops was the 8/16-bit IBM PC Convertible (Model 5140), introduced in 1986 and designer by Richard Sapper. It had a CGA-compatible LCD and two 720 KB 3.5-inch floppy drives. It weighed 13 pounds (5.9 kg).

== Epson L3s ==
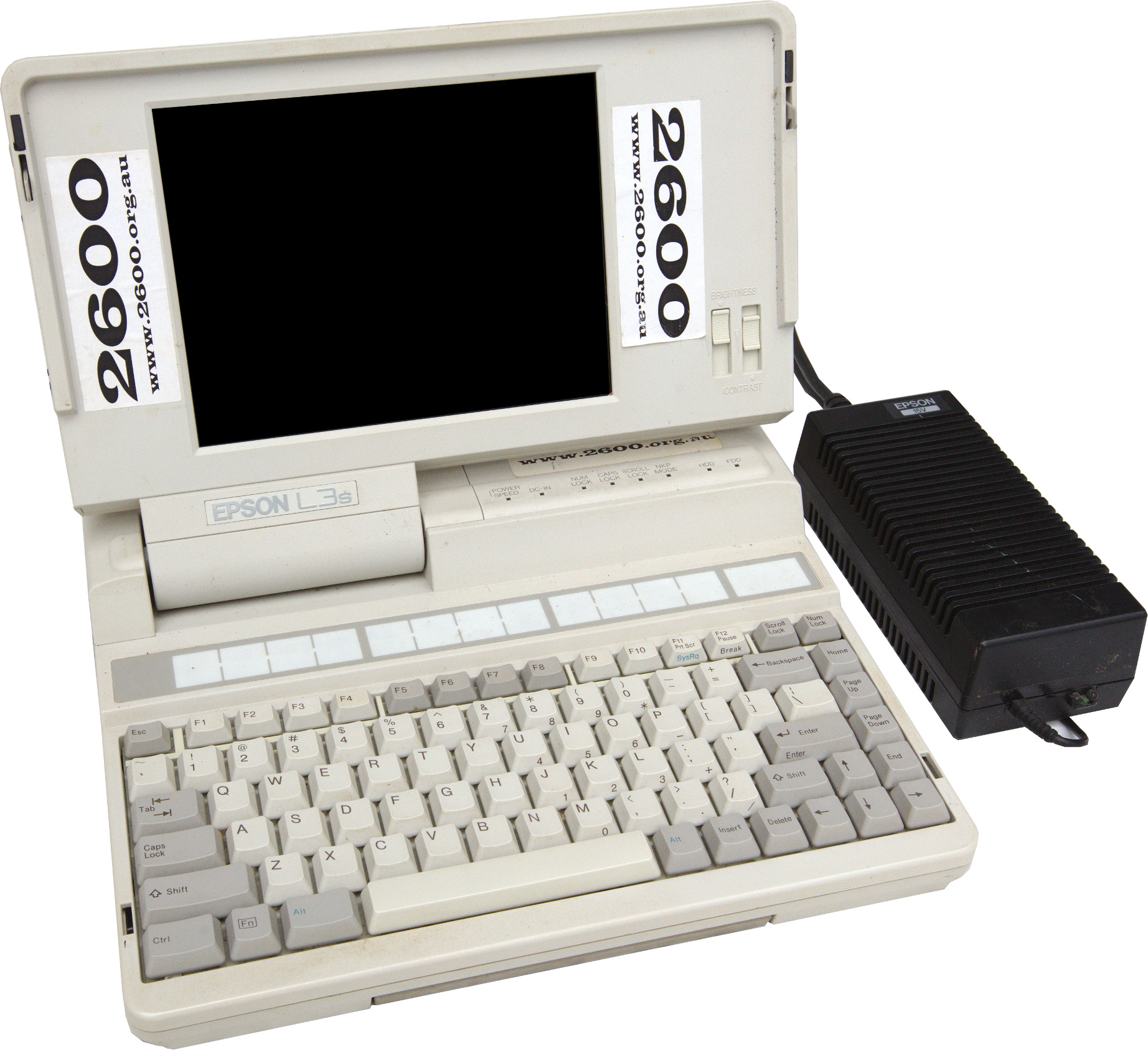
Epson L3s and power supply unit

The Epson L3s was an early portable computer that ran MS-DOS and featured a parallel port.

== Zenith SupersPort ==
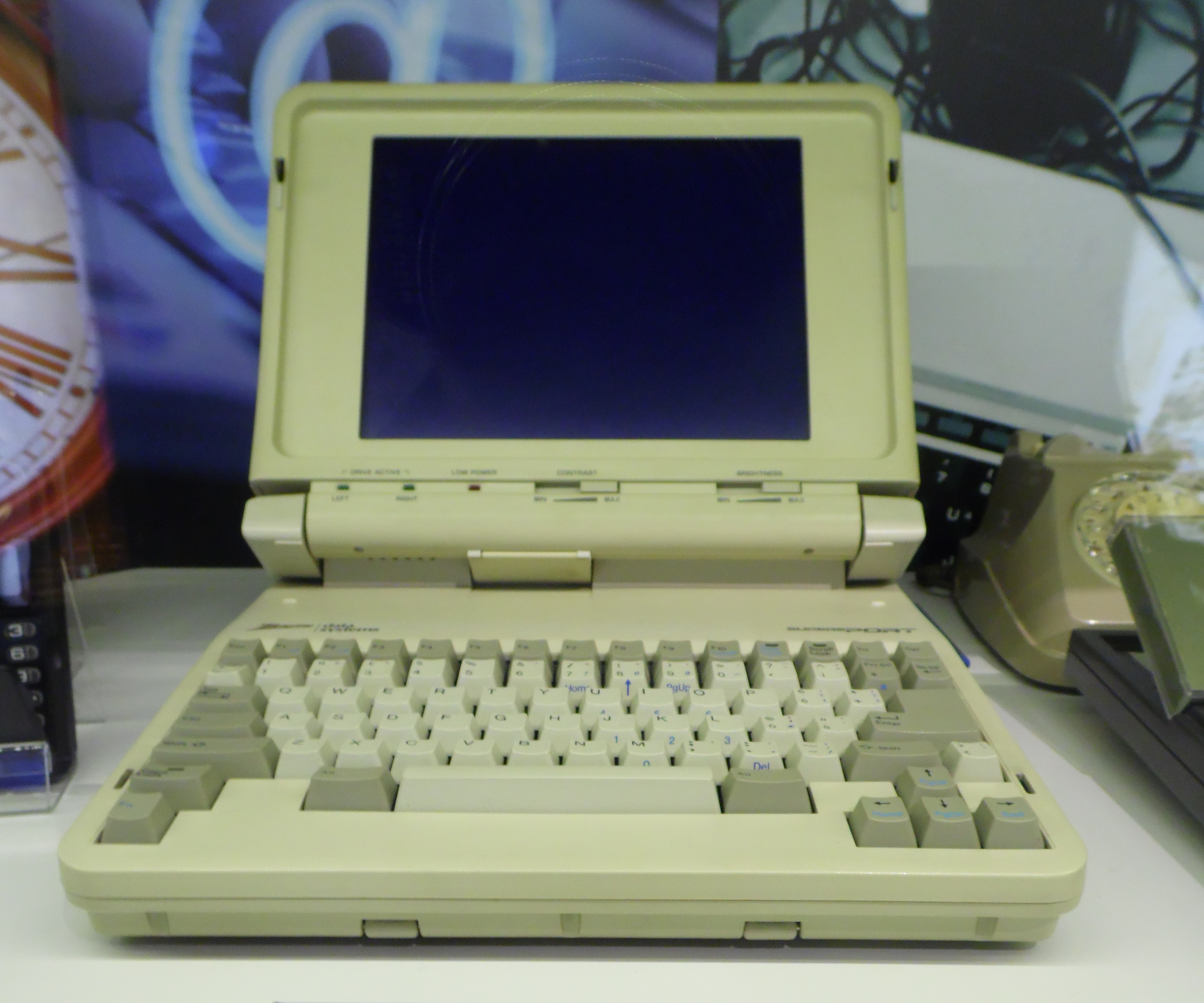
Zenith SupersPort (1988)

The first laptops successful on a large scale came in large part due to a RFP by the U.S. Air Force in 1987. This contract would eventually lead to the purchase of over 200,000 laptops. Competition to supply this contract was fierce and the major PC companies of the time; IBM, Toshiba, Compaq, NEC, and Zenith Data Systems (ZDS), rushed to develop laptops in an attempt to win this deal. ZDS, which had earlier won a landmark deal with the IRS for its Z-171, was awarded this contract for its SupersPort series. The SupersPort series was originally launched with an Intel 8086 processor, dual floppy disk drives, a backlit, blue-and-white STN LCD screen, and a NiCd battery pack. Later models featured a 16-bit Intel 80286 processor and a 20 MB hard disk drive. On the strength of this deal, ZDS became the world's largest laptop supplier in 1987 and 1988. ZDS partnered with Tottori Sanyo in the design and manufacturing of these laptops. This relationship is notable because it was the first deal between a major brand and an Asian original equipment manufacturer.

== Hewlett-Packard Vectra Portable CS ==
In 1987, HP released a portable version of their 16-bit Vectra CS computer. It had the classic laptop configuration (keyboard and monitor closes up clam-shell style in order to carry), however, it was very heavy and fairly large. It had a full-size keyboard (with separate numeric keypad) and a large amber LCD screen. While it was offered with dual 3.5-inch floppy disk drives, the most common configuration was a 20 MB hard drive and a single floppy drive. It was one of the first machines with a 1.44 MB density 3.5-inch disk drive.

== Cambridge Z88 ==
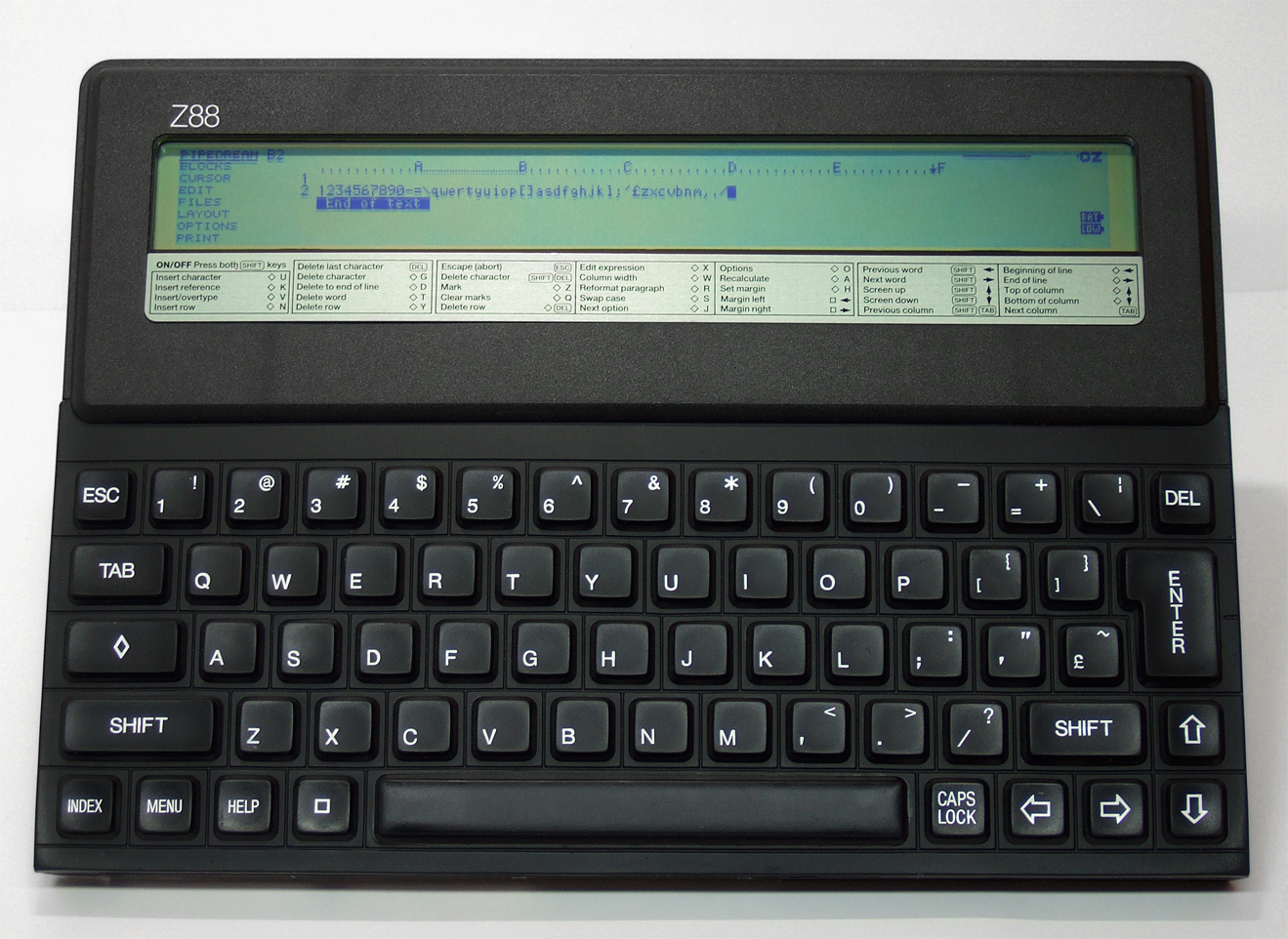
Cambridge Z88 (1987)

Another notable computer was the 8-bit Cambridge Z88, designed by Clive Sinclair, introduced in 1987.About the size of an A4 sheet of paper as well, it ran on standard batteries, and contained basic spreadsheet, word processing, and communications programs. It anticipated the future miniaturization of the portable computer, and as a ROM-based machine with a small display, can – like the TRS-80 Model 100 – also be seen as a forerunner of the personal digital assistant.

== Compaq SLT/286 ==
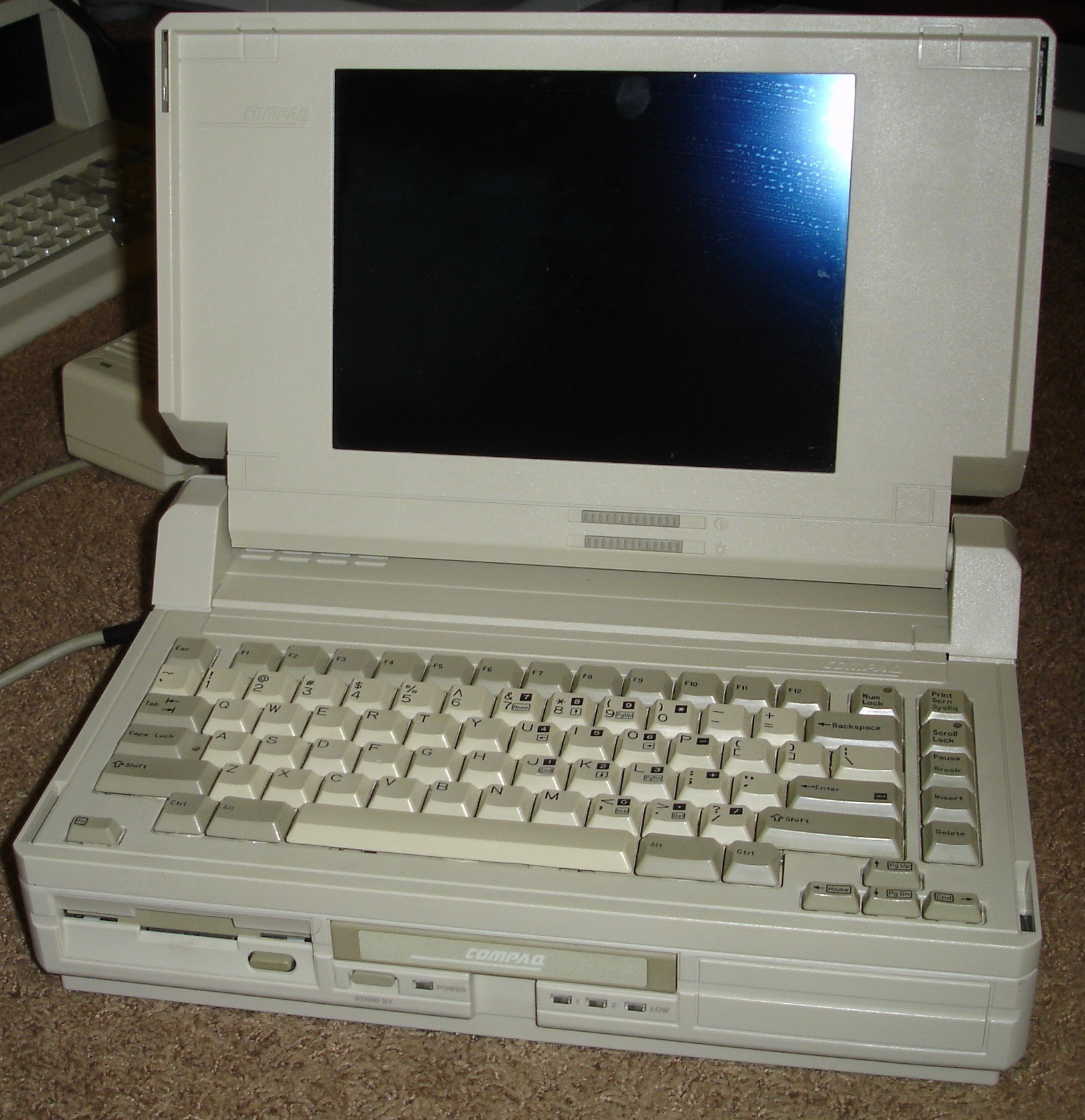
Compaq SLT/286 (1988)

By the end of the 1980s, laptop computers were becoming popular among business people. The 16-bit COMPAQ SLT/286 debuted in October 1988, being the first battery-powered laptop to support an internal hard disk drive and a VGA compatible LCD screen. It weighed 14 lb (6.4 kg).

== NEC UltraLite ==
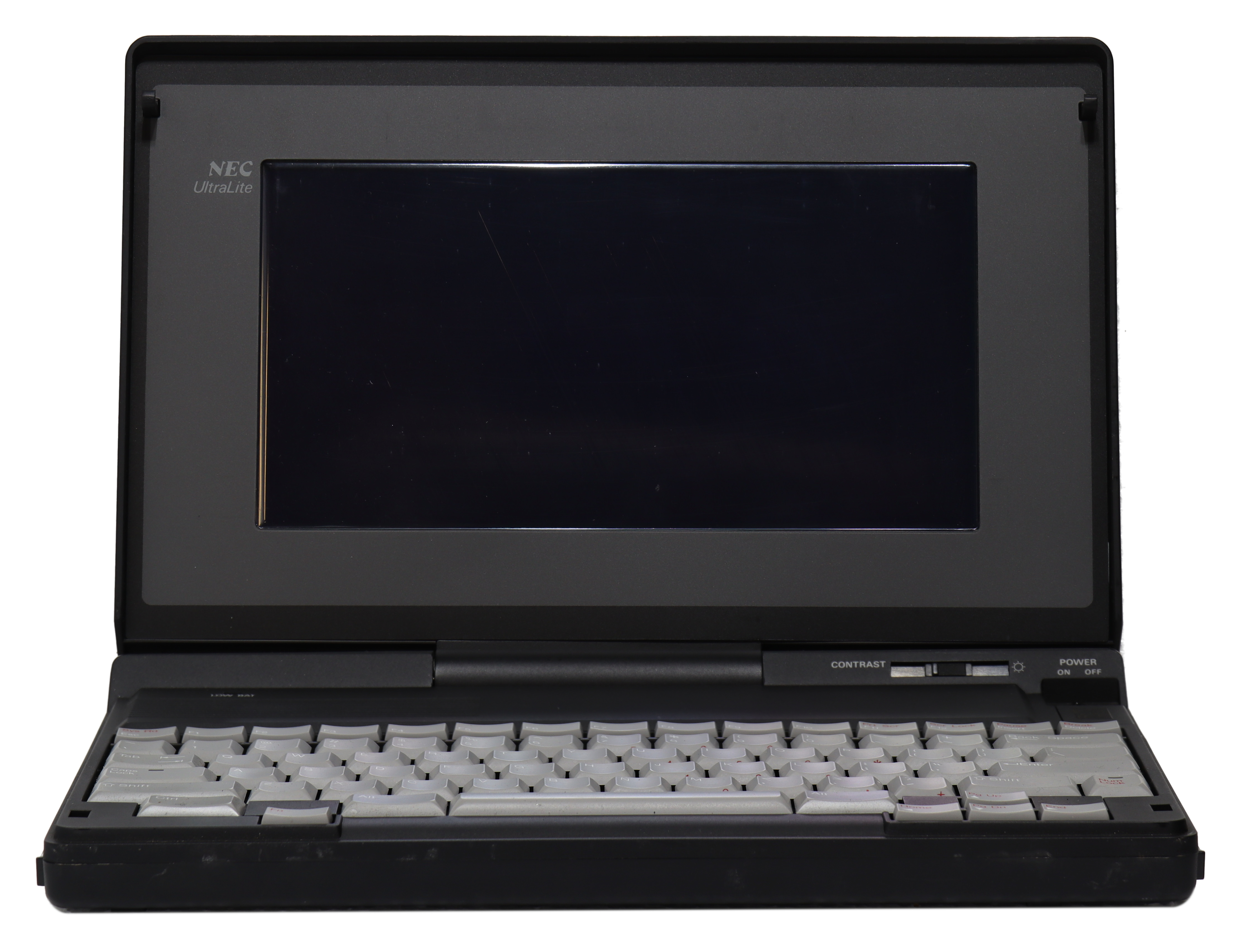
NEC UltraLite (1988)

The NEC UltraLite, released in October 1988, was the first "notebook" computer, weighing just 2 kg (4.4 lb), which was achieved by obviating floppy or hard drive, it was powered by the NEC V30 16-bit CPU. The very restrictive 2 megabyte RAM drive cramped the product's utility. Although portable computers with clamshell LCD screens already existed at the time of its release, the Ultralite was the first computer in a notebook form-factor. It was significantly smaller than all earlier portable computers and could be carried like a notebook and its clamshell LCD folded over the body like a book cover.

== Apple and IBM ==
=== Apple Macintosh Portable ===
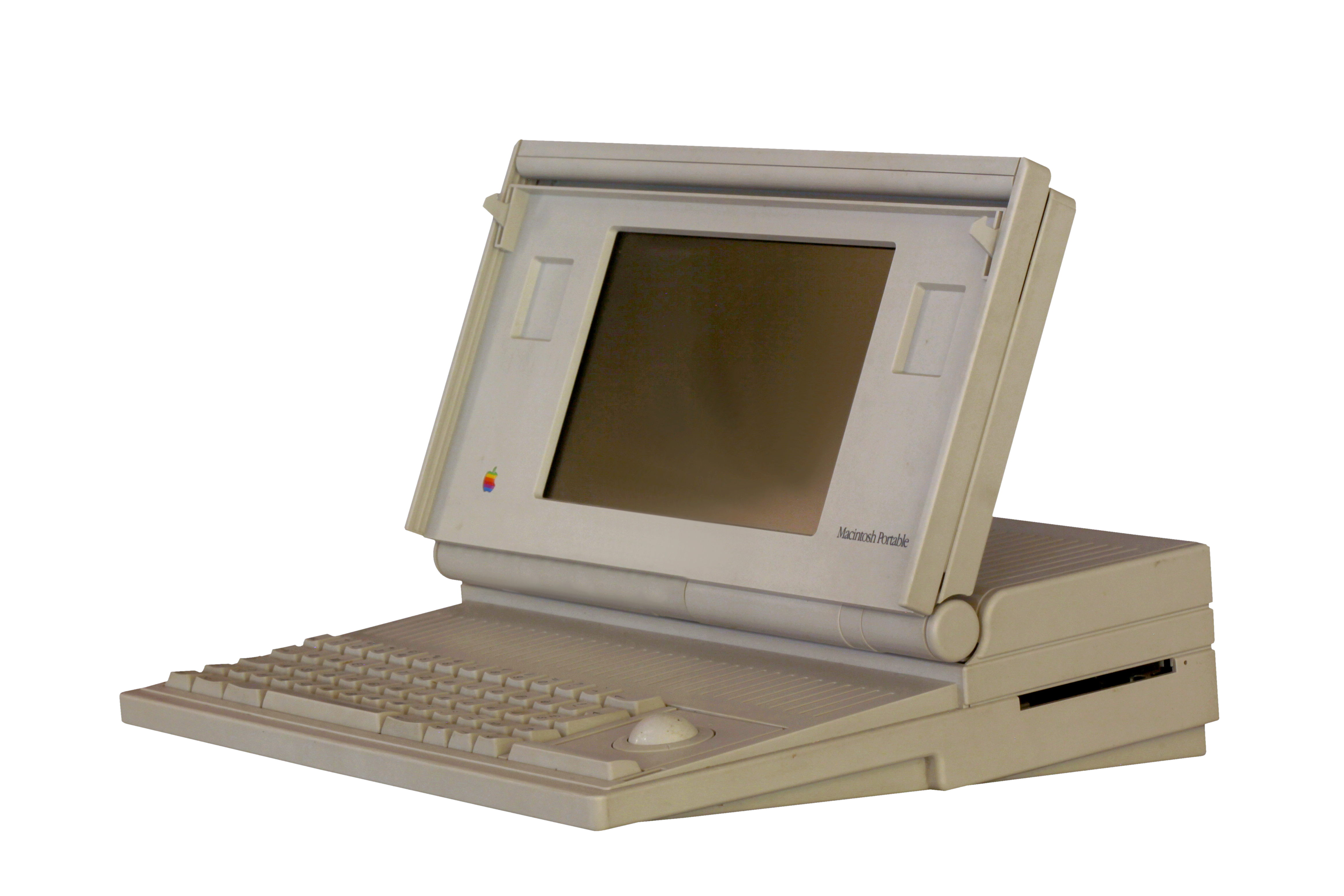
Apple Macintosh Portable (1989)

Apple's first laptop product was the 16-bit lead-acid battery powered 7.2 kg (16 lb) Macintosh Portable released in September 1989. The Portable pioneered inclusion of a pointing device (a trackball) in the laptop/portable sphere.

=== IBM PS/2 note ===
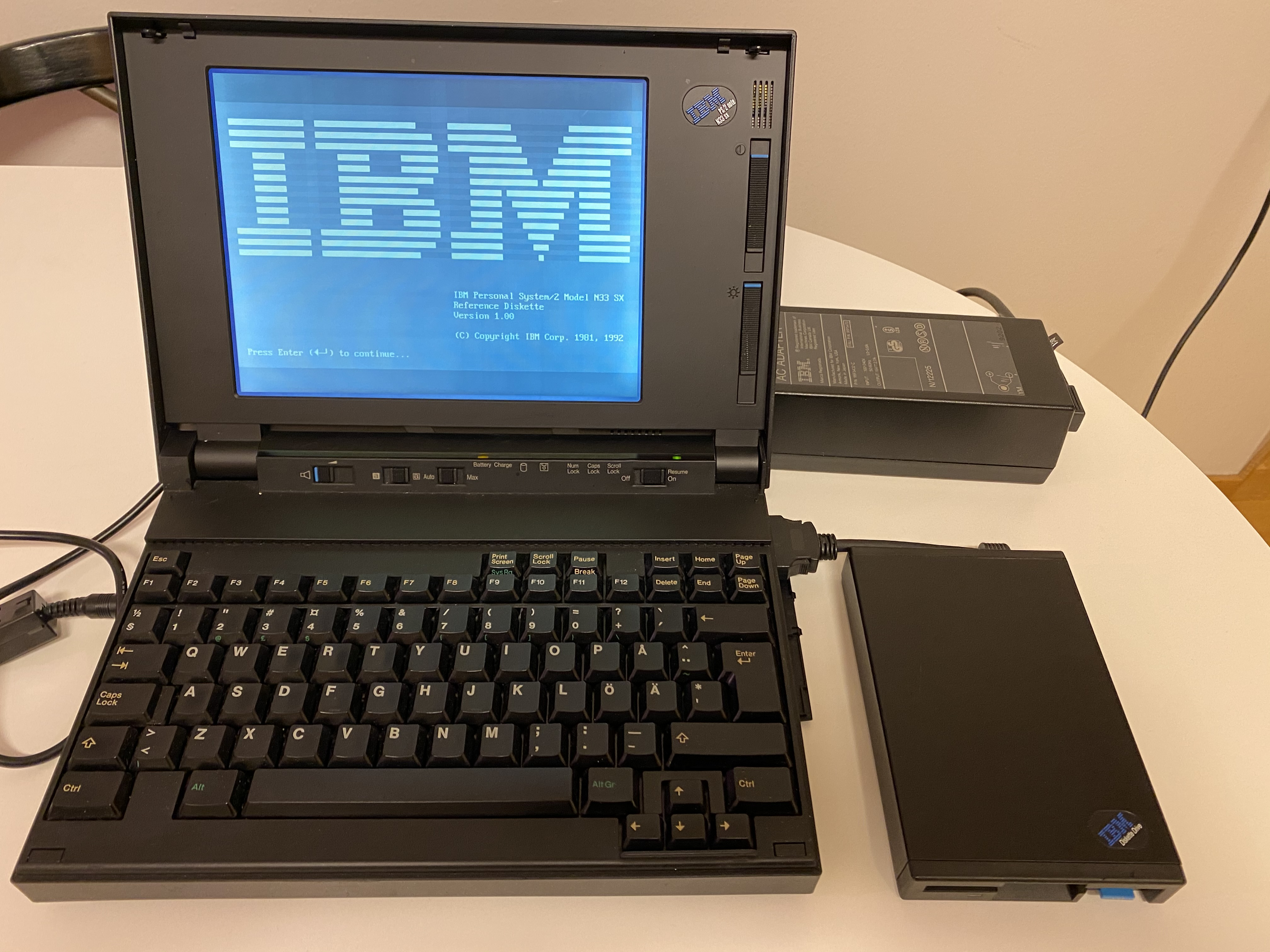
IBM PS/2 note (1992)

The IBM PS/2 note was a first IBM laptop with clamshell design, and the 1992's CL57sx model was IBM's first commercial laptop with color screen; the introduced options and features include the now-common peripherals-oriented PS/2 port as mobile device option, introduced the laptop BIOS and predecessor of laptop docking station (IBM Communications Cartridge).

=== Apple Powerbook ===
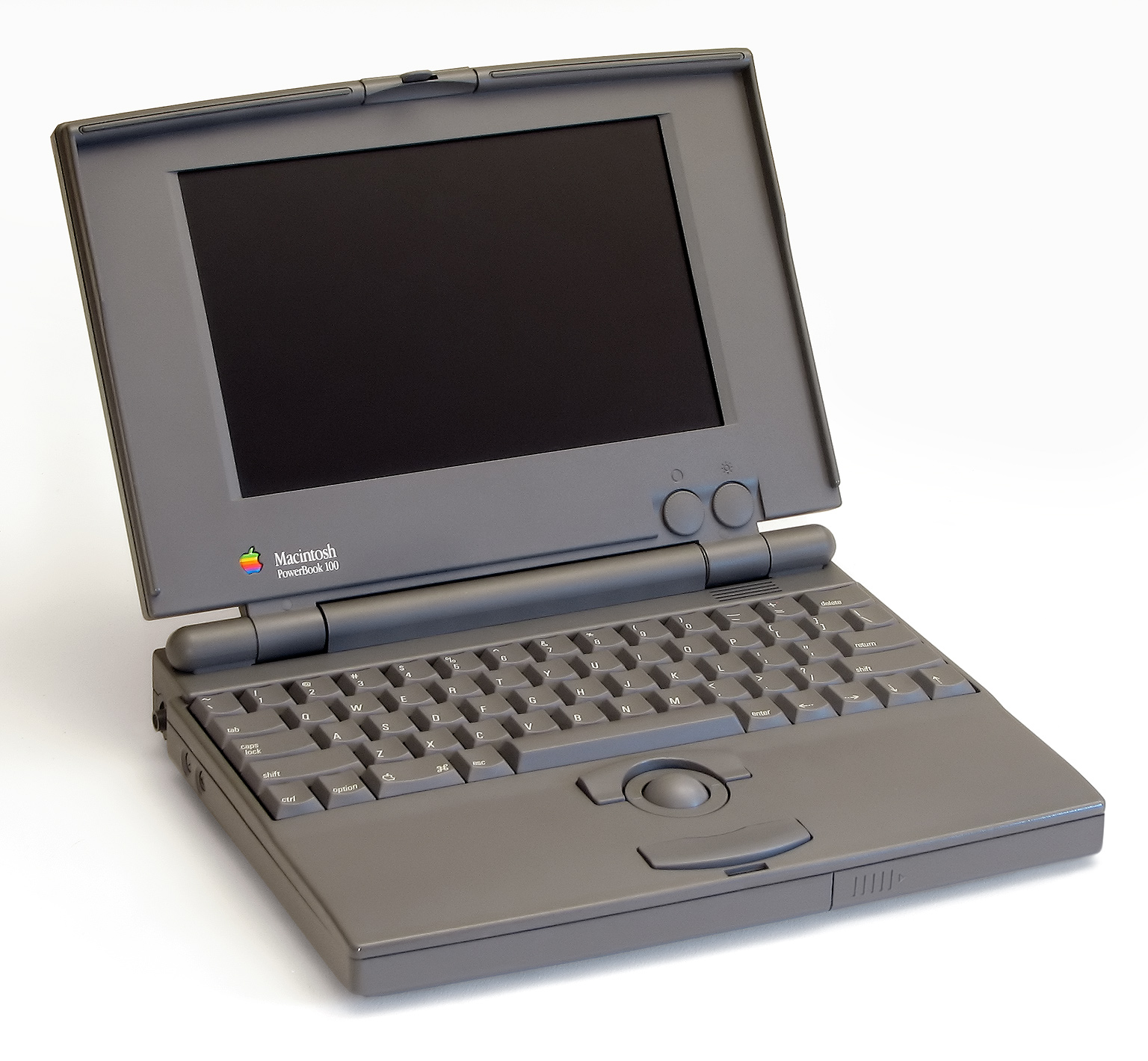
PowerBook 100 (1991)

The Apple PowerBook series, introduced in October 1991, pioneered changes that are now de facto standards on laptops, including room for a palm rest.

Later PowerBooks featured optional color displays (PowerBook 165c, 1993), and first true touchpad (PowerBook 500 series, 1994), first 16-bit stereo audio, and first built-in Ethernet network adapter (PowerBook 500, 1994).

=== IBM ThinkPad ===
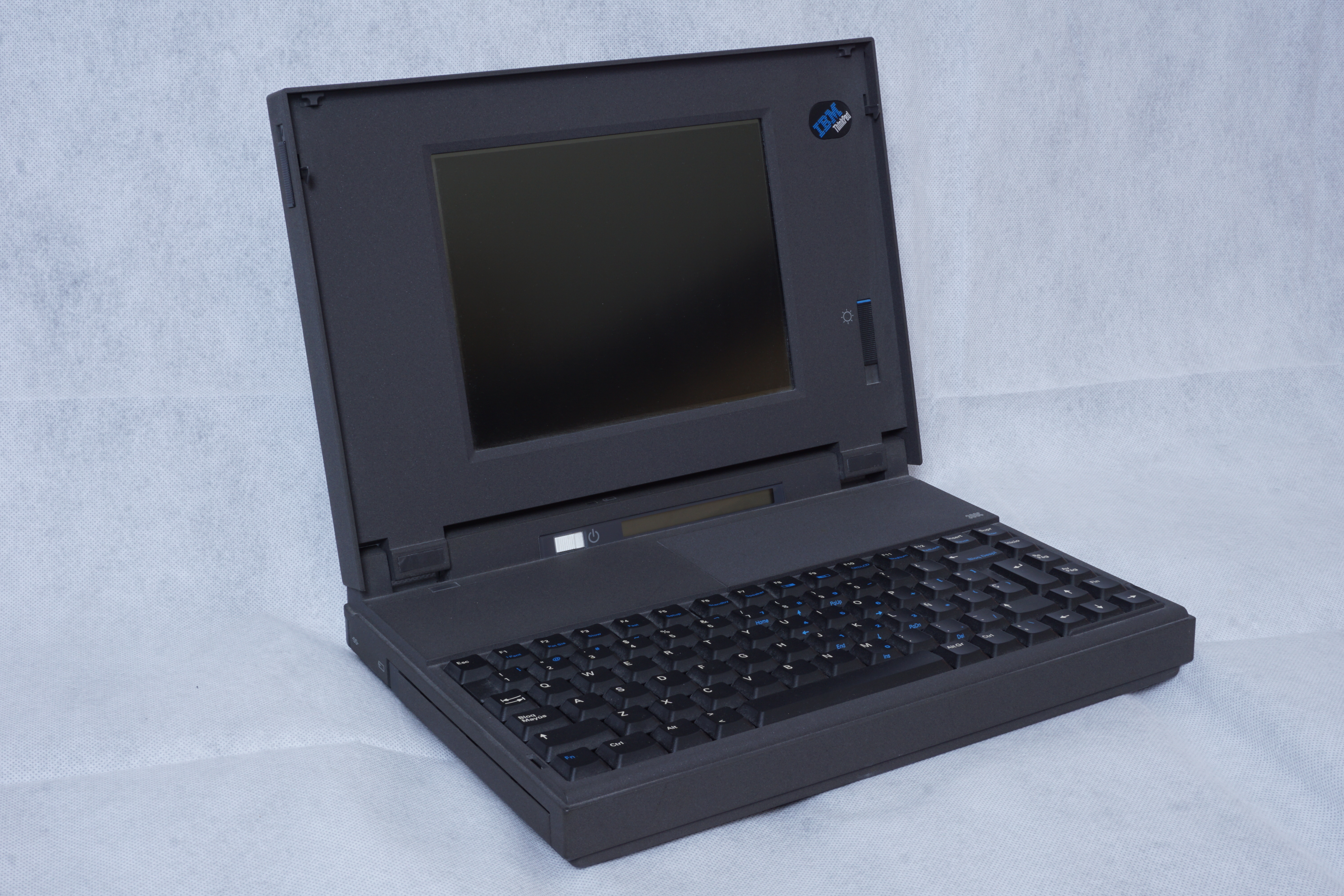
ThinkPad 300 (1992)

In 1992, IBM released its ThinkPad 300, 700 and 700C, featuring a clamshell design similar to the PS/2 line. The 700 and 700C (the "C" version came with a color display) came with the distinctive red TrackPoint pointing device that is still used to this day. The ThinkPad raised a new standard for business class laptops with its modular design, greater durability and more productivity options, including video capture and cameras (ThinkPad Power Series 850, 1995), removable drive bays, secondary batteries, and backlit keyboards.

== APM and SMI/SMM ==
Windows 3.1 was the first version of Windows to support Advanced Power Management, which was usually implemented with SMI in the BIOS (introduced with the Intel 80386SL). Windows 95 introduced standardized support for docking via the PnP BIOS (among other things). Prior to this point each brand used custom BIOS, drivers and in some cases, ASICs, to optimize the battery life of its machines. This move by Microsoft was controversial in the eyes of notebook designers because it greatly reduced their ability to innovate; however, it did serve its role in simplifying and stabilizing certain aspects of notebook design.

== Intel Pentium processor ==
Windows 95 ushered in the importance of the CD-ROM drive in mobile computing, and helped the shift to the Intel Pentium processor as the base platform for notebooks. The first Pentium notebook to market was the Nan Tan (Clevo) 3600, which released in roughly April-May 1994. It predated the release of Intel's mobile Pentium CPU, so instead used desktop-class Socket 4 processors. As an Original design manufacturer, Nan Tan did not sell the 3600 under their own brand, so it instead appeared under the names of different resellers, including Sager, BSi, FutureTech, and others. The first laptop with a mobile Pentium was the Toshiba T4900CT, which shipped in November 1994.

The first Pentium notebook to include a CD-ROM drive was the Toshiba Satellite Pro 400 Series, which released in June 1995. It included a modular bay, which allowed the user to replace the CD-ROM drive with a floppy drive. Some other CD-ROM notebooks of the time used a 3-Spindle design, meaning that the hard drive, floppy drive, and CD-ROM drive were built-in and accessible simultaneously. The earliest 3-Spindle notebook was the 486-based Panasonic CF-41, which released in August 1994. It was also the first notebook computer to include a 5.25-inch CD-ROM drive at all.

== Improved technology ==
Early laptop displays were so primitive that PC Magazine in 1986 published an article discussing them with the headline "Is It On Yet?". It said of the accompanying montage of nine portable computers, "Pictured at the right are two screens and seven elongated smudges". The article stated that "LCD screens still look to many observers like Etch-a-Sketch toys, or gray chalk on a dirty blackboard", and predicted that until displays improved, "laptops will continue to be a niche rather than a mainstream direction".

They did improve; BYTE in 1989 wrote in a review of two 80286-based laptops that unlike early "barely legible 'light gray on dark gray' screens", their displays had "excellent contrast and are easy to read under a variety of ambient lighting conditions", albeit still monochrome and with difficult-to-see cursors. As technology further improved during the 1990s, the usefulness and popularity of laptops increased. Correspondingly prices went down. Several developments specific to laptops were quickly implemented, improving usability and performance. Among them were:

- Improved battery technology. The heavy lead-acid batteries were replaced with lighter and more efficient technologies, first nickel cadmium or NiCd, then nickel metal hydride (NiMH) and then Lithium-ion battery and lithium polymer.
- Power-saving processors. While laptops in 1989 were limited to the 80286 processor (often Harris CMOS) because of the energy demands of the more powerful 80386 on the original CHMOS III process, the introduction of the Intel 386SL processor, designed for the specific power needs of laptops, marked the point at which laptop needs were included in CPU design. The 386SL integrated a 386SX core with a memory controller and this was paired with an I/O chip to create the SL chipset. It was more integrated than any previous solution although its cost was higher. It was heavily adopted by the major notebook brands of the time. Intel followed this with the 486SL chipset which used the same architecture. However, Intel had to abandon this design approach as it introduced its Pentium series. Early versions of the mobile Pentium required TAB mounting (also used in LCD manufacturing) and this initially limited the number of companies capable of supplying notebooks. However, Intel did eventually migrate to more standard chip packaging. One limitation of notebooks has always been the difficulty in upgrading the processor which is a common attribute of desktops. Intel did try to solve this problem with the introduction of the MMC for mobile computing. The MMC was a standard module upon which the CPU and external cache memory could sit. It gave the notebook buyer the potential to upgrade their CPU at a later date, eased the manufacturing process somewhat, and was also used in some cases to skirt U.S. import duties as the CPU could be added to the chassis after it arrived in the U.S. Intel stuck with MMC for a few generations but ultimately could not maintain the appropriate speed and data integrity to the memory subsystem through the MMC connector. A more specialized power saving CPU variant for laptops is the PowerPC 603 family. Derived from IBM's 601 series for laptops (while the 604 branch was for desktops), it found itself used on many low end Apple desktops before it was widely used in laptops, starting with PowerBook models 5300, 2400, 500 upgrades. What started out as a laptop processor was eventually used across all platforms in its follow up, the PowerPC 750 AKA G3.
- Improved Liquid-crystal displays, in particular active-matrix TFT (Thin-film transistor) LCD technology. Early laptop screens were black and white, blue and white, or grayscale, STN (Super Twist Nematic) passive-matrix LCDs prone to heavy shadows, ghosting and blurry movement (some portable computer screens were sharper monochrome plasma displays, but these drew too much current to be powered by batteries). Color STN screens were used for some time although their viewing quality was poor. By about 1991, two new color LCD technologies hit the mainstream market in a big way; Dual STN and TFT. The Dual STN screens solved many of the viewing problems of STN at a very affordable price and the TFT screens offered excellent viewing quality although initially at a steep price. DSTN continued to offer a significant cost advantage over TFT until the mid-90s before the cost delta dropped to the point that DSTN was no longer used in notebooks. Improvements in production technology meant displays became larger, sharper, had higher native resolutions, faster response time and could display color with great accuracy, making them an acceptable substitute for a traditional CRT monitor.
- Improved storage technology. Early laptops and portables had only floppy disk drives. As thin, high-capacity hard disk drives with higher reliability and shock resistance and lower power consumption became available, users could store their work on laptop computers and take it with them. The 3.5" HDD was created initially as a response to the needs of notebook designers that needed smaller, lower power consumption products. With continuing pressure to shrink the notebook size even further, the 2.5" HDD was introduced. One Laptop Per Child (OLPC) and other new laptops use Flash RAM (non volatile, non mechanical memory device) instead of the mechanical hard disk.
- Improved connectivity. Internal modems and standard serial, parallel, and PS/2 ports on IBM PC-compatible laptops made it easier to work away from home; the addition of network adapters and, from 1997, USB, as well as, from 1999, Wi-Fi, made laptops as easy to use with peripherals as a desktop computer. Many newer laptops are also available with built-in 3G Broadband wireless modems.
- Other peripherals may include:
  - an integrated video camera for video communication
  - a fingerprint sensor for implementing a restriction of access to a sensitive data or the computer itself.

== Netbooks ==
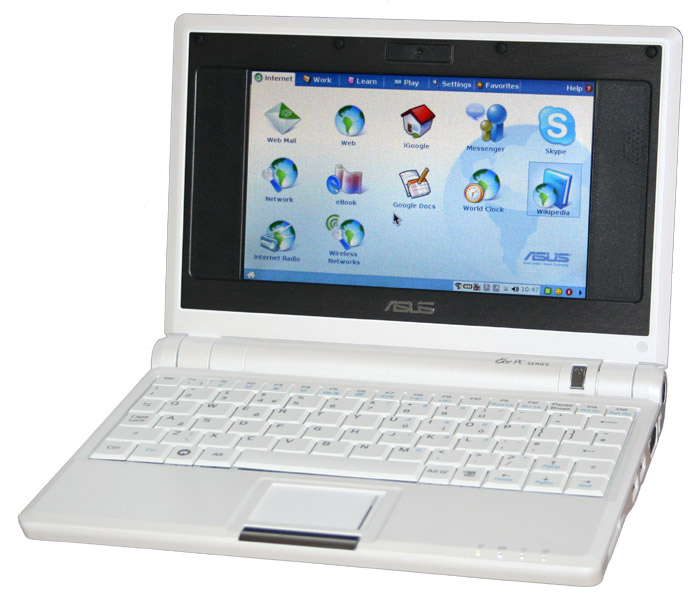
Asus Eee PC

In June 2007, Asus announced the Eee PC 701 to be released in October, a small lightweight x86 Celeron-M ULV 353 powered laptop with 4 GB SDHC disk and a 7-inch screen. Despite previous attempts to launch small lightweight computers such as ultra-portable PC, the Eee was the first success story largely due to its low cost, small size, low weight and versatility. The term 'Netbook' was later dubbed by Intel. Asus then extended the Eee line with models with features such as a 9-inch screen and other brands, including Acer, MSI and Dell followed suit with similar devices, often built on the fledgling low-power Intel Atom processor architecture.

== Smartbooks ==
In 2009, Qualcomm introduced a new term "smartbook", which stands for a hybrid device between smartphone and laptop.

== See also ==
- History of mobile phones
- History of personal computers
- History of software
- List of pioneers in computer science
- Timeline of portable computers
