= Dynabook Inc. =

Japanese personal computer manufacturer

- Headquarters building in Toyosu, Tokyo
- Native name: Dynabook株式会社
- Formerly: Kawasaki Typewriter (1954-1958); Toshiba Typewriter (1958-1968); Toshiba Business Machine (1968-1984); Toshiba Information Equipments (1984-2016); Toshiba Client Solutions (2016-2019)
- Type: Subsidiary
- Industry: Computer hardware; Electronics
- Founded: 9 September 1954; 72 years ago (original); 1 January 2019; 7 years ago (as Dynabook)
- Headquarters: Toyosu, Tokyo, Japan
- Key people: Tetsuji Kawamura (chairman); Kiyofumi Kakudo (president)
- Products: Personal computers
- Parent: Sharp Corporation
- Website: dynabook.com

Dynabook Inc. (Dynabook株式会社, Dainabukku Kabushiki-gaisha), stylized dynabook, is a Japanese personal computer manufacturer based in Kōtō, Tokyo, owned by Sharp Corporation; it was previously part of, and branded overseas as, Toshiba, until 2018. The Dynabook name had already been used by Toshiba in the Japanese market since 1989 for laptop products.

Under Toshiba, it notably launched the Toshiba T1100 in 1985, cited as the first ever commercial laptop PC. The company was a major manufacturer of PCs until a decline in fortunes led to Toshiba selling the business to Sharp in 2018, with new products since rebranded to Dynabook worldwide.

== History ==
=== Corporate ===
The company's origins date back to the 1950s as a maker of typewriters called Kawasaki Typewriter Co., Ltd., which in 1958 was bought by Tokyo Shibaura Electric Co., Ltd. (later Toshiba Corporation), and the business changed its name to Toshiba Typewriter Co., Ltd. In 1968, the name changed to Toshiba Business Machine Co.

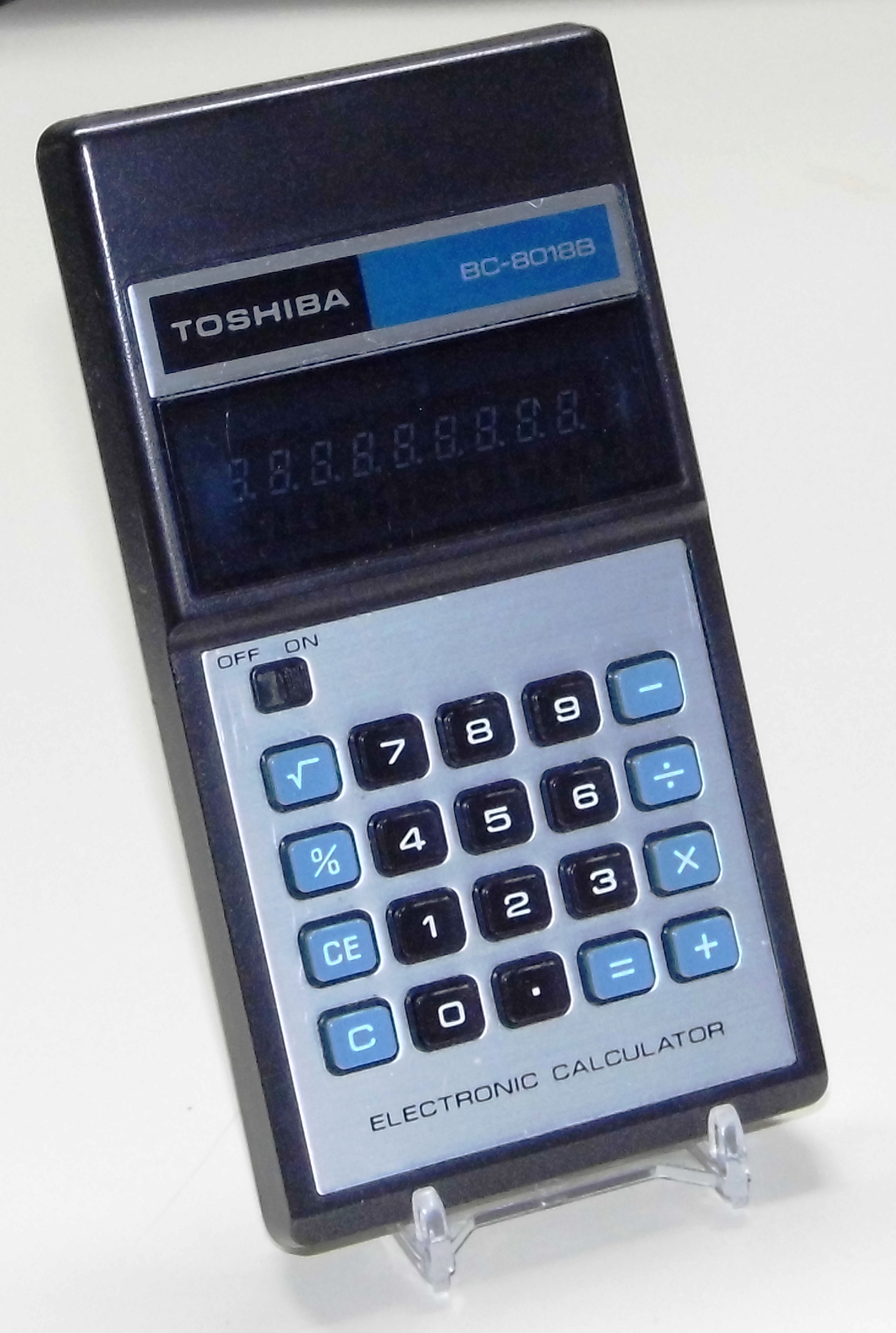
Toshiba calculator by Toshiba Business Machine Company, 1970s

Toshiba Corporation established Toshiba Business Computers Co. in 1977, which was merged with Toshiba Business Machines in 1984 with the result company named Toshiba Information Systems Corporation. In April 2016, control of the PC business was transferred to a sales company targeting domestic corporations by means of a company split at Toshiba Corporation, the resulting entity named Toshiba Client Solutions Co., Ltd..

In 2018, Toshiba Corporation was in the midst of an accounting scandal, and was under pressure to cut costs; Toshiba Client Solutions Co., Ltd. (TCS), the personal computer division, became 80.1% owned by Sharp Corporation, in turn majority-owned by Foxconn; Sharp paid $36 million for the shares. TCS then changed its corporate name to Dynabook, Inc. It marked Sharp Corporation's return to the PC market having last marketed the Mebius in Japan in 2010, and previously also the Actius and WideNote series globally. Sharp exercised a call option on the remaining 19.9% of the shares on June 30, 2020, making Dynabook wholly owned by Sharp in August 2020, and indicated plans for Dynabook to have an initial public offering in 2020 or 2021.

As of 2019, Dynabook Inc. had 162.9 billion yen (US$1.5 billion) in annual sales and 2,680 employees. In 2024 the company had 1,867 employees and 8.55 billion yen in capital.

=== Toshiba era ===
==== Toshiba computers ====
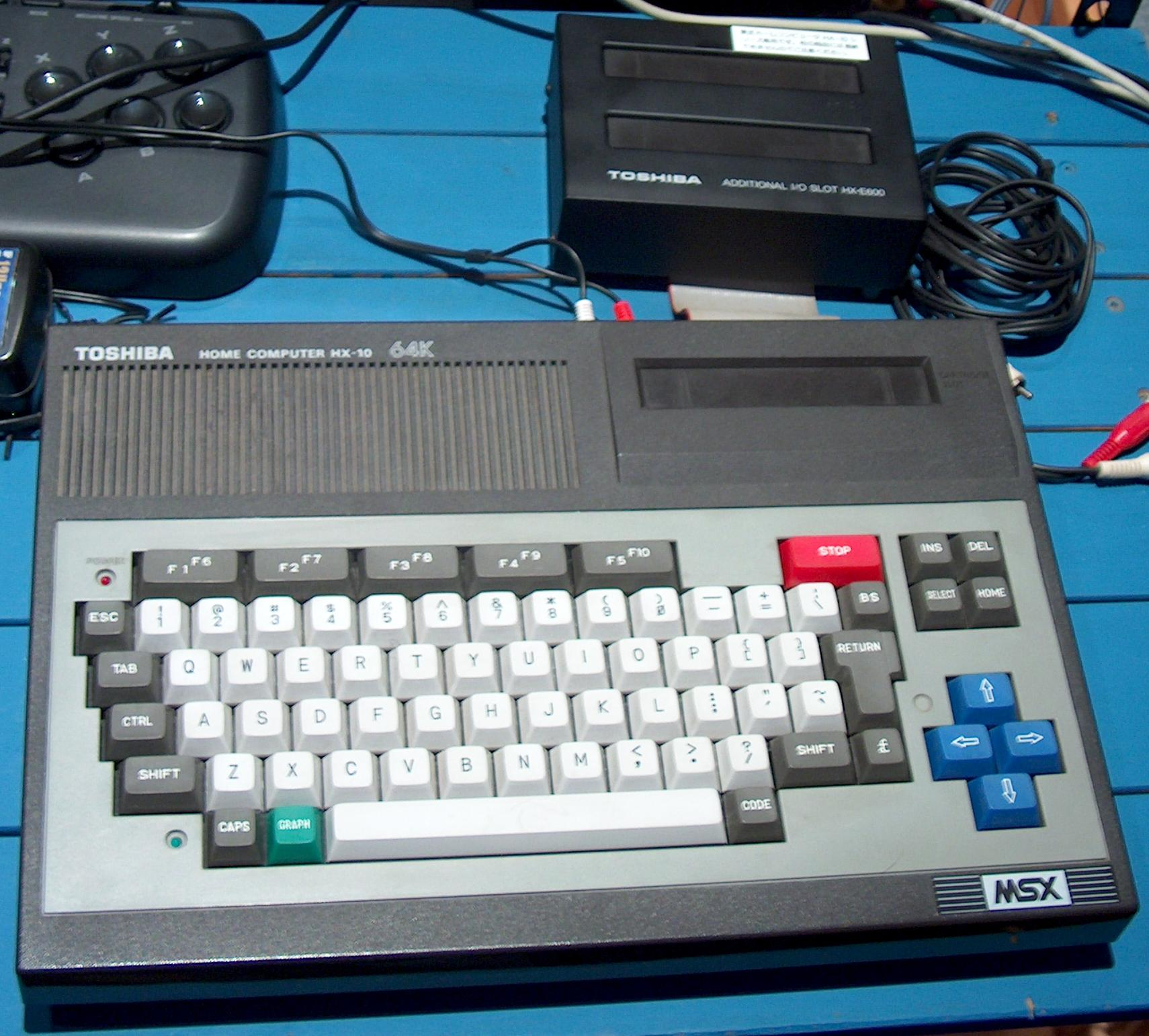
Toshiba HX-10

Toshiba's history with computers date back to the 1950s. Toshiba worked with researchers at the University of Tokyo and manufactured a vacuum-tube computer called TAC, containing 7,000 tubes and 3,000 diodes. Then in the 1960s, the company developed and released TOSBAC (TOshiba Scientific and Business Automatic Computer) mainframes, including the first with its own operating system released in 1964. This OS was called TOPS-1, based on a Fortran monitor. They also partnered with the General Electric Company of the United States. In 1981, Toshiba released the first in a line of home computers under the Pasopia name, which run on a BASIC based operating system. The original model was also sold in the United States as the Toshiba T100. Toshiba Pasopia IQ was a separate line that was MSX compatible.

In 1985, Toshiba released the Toshiba T1100, an 8-bit IBM PC compatible, which is claimed by them to be the first ever mass-market laptop computer. The company launched the Toshiba T3100 in 1986, which was 16-bit; its Japanese variant the Toshiba J-3100 was the first 16-bit PC in Japan. 1987 saw the launch of Toshiba T1000.

==== The first Dynabook ====
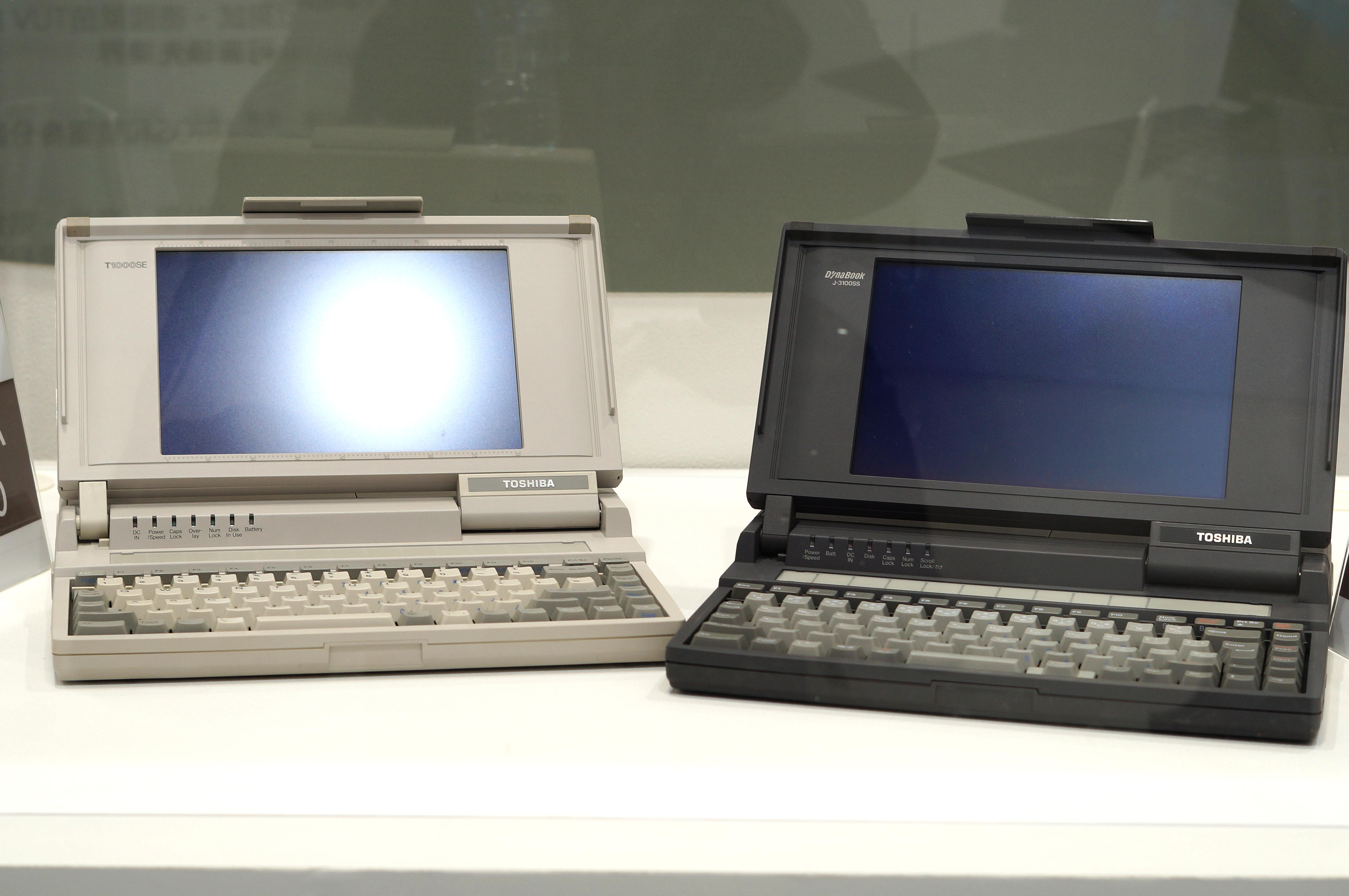
The original 'Dynabooks': Toshiba T1000SE and Toshiba DynaBook J-3100 SS001

The 'dynabook' was a portable computer concept first introduced by Alan C. Kay in the 1960s and 1970s. Tetsuya Mizoguchi, an executive in Toshiba's mainframe computer division, read Kay's paper "Personal Dynamic Media" in the March 1977 IEEE Computer; and inspired by the concept of a computer that could be carried and used by anyone of any age, Mizoguchi became determined to develop such a computer. The Dynabook trademark was already owned by other companies in Japan and the United States: ASCII Corporation had acquired the rights in Japan, so Toshiba paid a fee to ASCII to use the name there. The trademark rights in Britain, France, and West Germany were also able to be acquired.

The first Toshiba computer with the name DynaBook was announced on June 26, 1989, released in Japan (model number J-3100 SS001) featuring a 3.5 inch disk drive and full sized keyboard, weighing five pounds. Its compact size (then the original definition for a 'notebook laptop'), combined with its low price, made it a major hit in the country, and led to Toshiba adopting the DynaBook brand name for most of its future notebooks sold domestically. Toshiba and the present day Dynabook Inc. have since commemorated it as the "world's first notebook PC".

The DynaBook was later released in America but as the name could not be used, it was released as Toshiba T1000SE. In August 1989, Mizoguchi sent a letter and a Toshiba T1000SE to Kay in Boston, and in December Kay was Mizoguchi's guest at Toshiba. The DynaBook along with NEC's 98 Note together accounted for the "vast majority" of notebook computer sales in Japan in the year 1990. In 1990, the T1000SE became mandatory for all 82 students at Methodist Ladies' College, Melbourne.

==== 1990s and 2000s ====
In early 1990, Toshiba released the T1000XE and T1200XE, aimed at competing against Compaq's LTE. In 1992, Toshiba launched DynaBook EZ in Japan which had applications built into ROM. The following year, EZ486P with a i486SX chip and featuring a built-in printer was released and achieved 3 million sales worldwide. Also in 1993, Toshiba released a pen-based tablet computer under the name DynaPad.

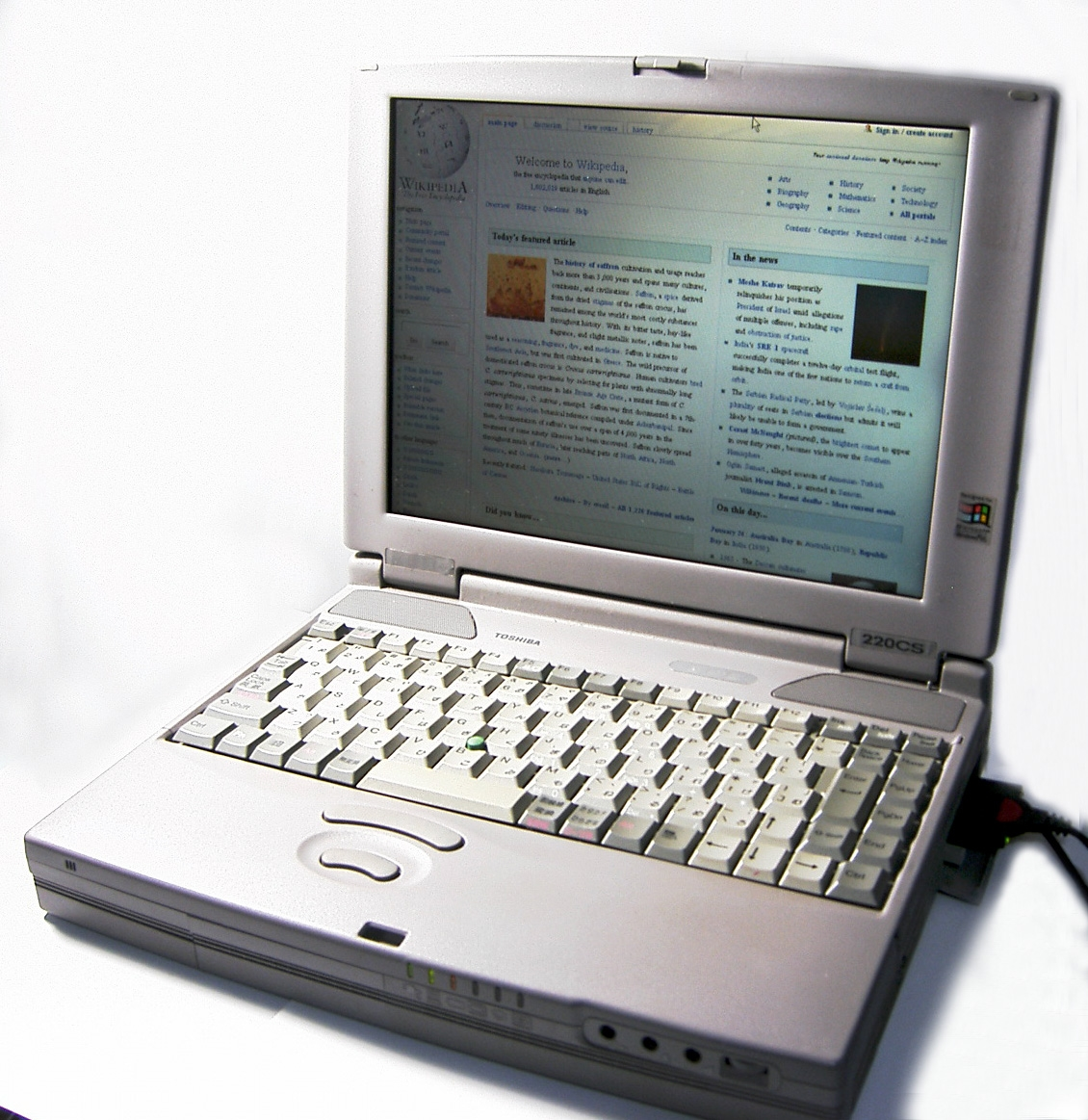
Toshiba Satellite 220CS (1997)

The Satellite series was launched as a value-priced line of notebooks. In c. 1995, Toshiba launched the Tecra series which was described as their "flagship high-performance mobile computer". In September 1996, Toshiba announced its first consumer desktop computer in the American market, called the Infinia, a high-end, black-colored Pentium computer with analog TV/FM radio card included in its highest configuration. The same year the company also released its first Libretto, a subnotebook or handheld computer running Windows 95.

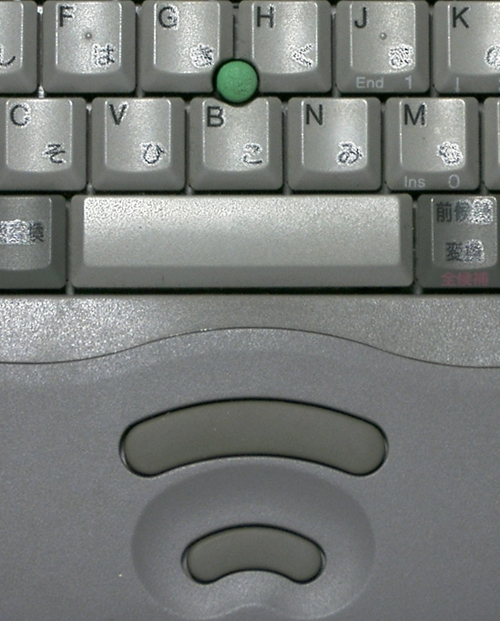
AccuPoint pointing stick on a Toshiba

Toshiba shipped its 10 millionth notebook computer in 1997. In November 1997, the company announced the discontinuation of their Infinia desktop line. In 2002, it launched the Portege 2000, called the "thinnest notebook" and weighing 2.6 pounds. The Tecra M4 tablet PC was launched in 2005. In September 2006, Toshiba recalled thousands of batteries, supplied by Sony, shipped with some of its laptops as they could lose power. However, unlike the battery recalls by Apple and Dell in August 2006, which were also Sony-supplied, Toshiba reported that its affected batteries did not pose fire hazards.

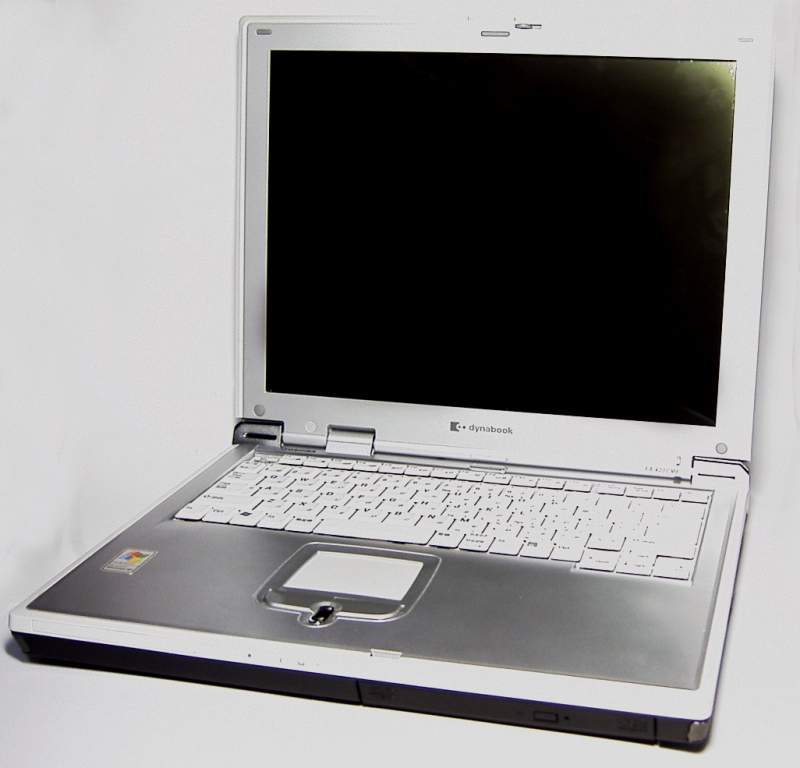
Dynabook E7 518CME (2003, Japan model)

In 2008, Toshiba released the Qosmio G55, the first laptop with embedded technology from the Cell processor, which Toshiba co-developed for Sony's PlayStation 3. In December 2008, Toshiba and Sun Microsystems announced that Toshiba will ship laptops with OpenSolaris in the U.S. beginning in 2009.

==== 2010s ====
In 2010 the Toshiba Libretto W100 was a one-off revival of the Libretto line and was the "first dual-touchscreen" notebook. In April 2011, Toshiba announced the DynaBook Qosmio T851/D8CR, described as "the world's first glasses-free 3D notebook PC able to display 3D and 2D content at the same time on one screen". It was slated for a release in Japan. The Toshiba Portégé Z830 was launched as their first Ultrabook.

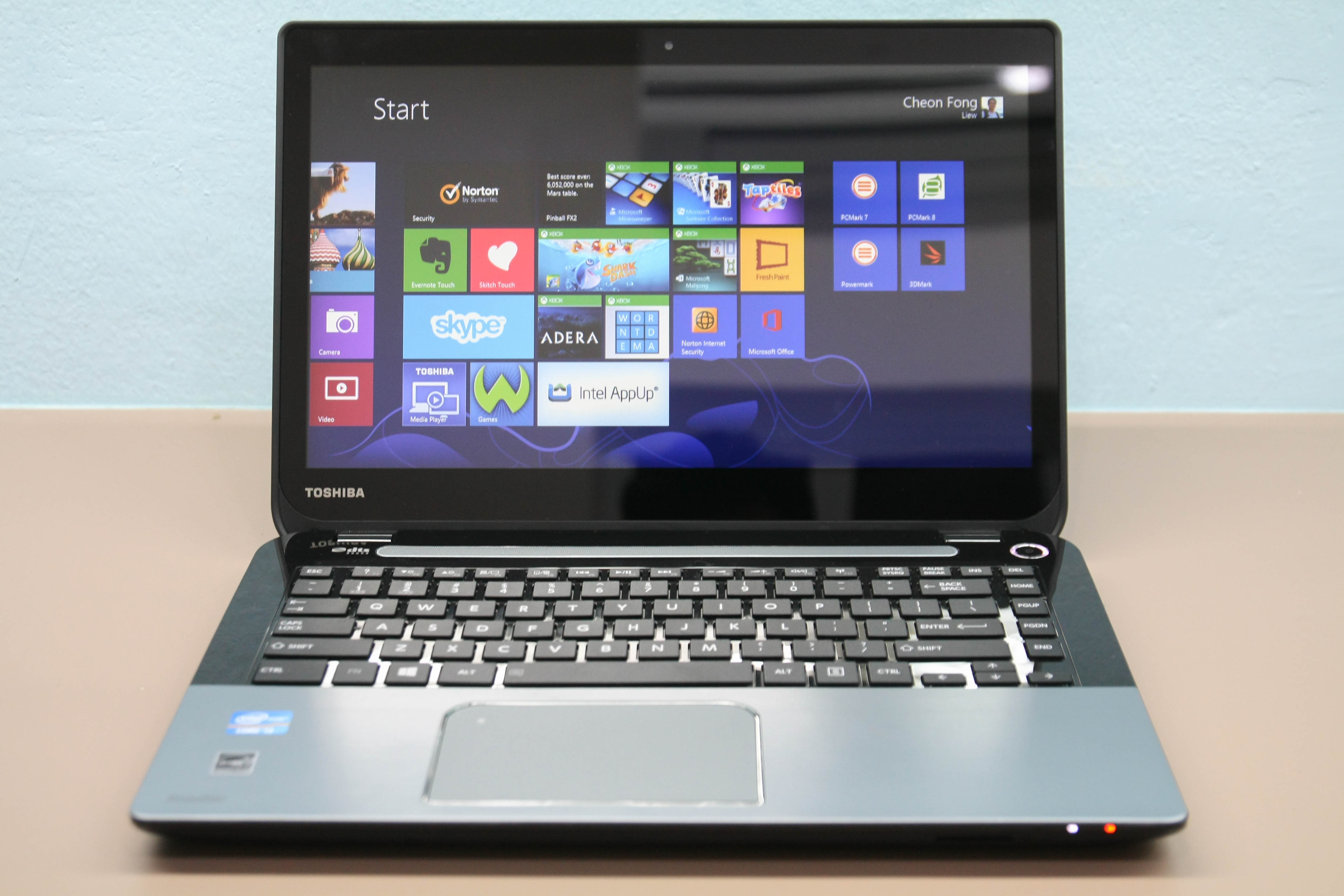
Toshiba Satellite S40t running Windows 8

In 2013, Toshiba released the Kirabook (Dynabook Kira in Japan), a high-end Windows 8 notebook. In 2014, it launched the Toshiba Encore Windows 8.1 tablet and the Excite Go, a low-end Android tablet. In a LaptopMag.com ranking the best and worst laptop brands, Toshiba was placed last in 2013 and again in 2016; it was placed fourth in 2011. The DynaPad tablet running Windows 10 was launched in October 2015. In March 2016, Toshiba announced that it will stop selling consumer notebooks in Western markets due to falling profits and instead only focus on business products and aiming for profits with business-to-business sales of premium products. In 2017, Toshiba announced the Portege X20W 2-in-1 convertible.

During the 1990s, Toshiba globally ranked as the largest manufacturer of laptop/notebook computers. However its presence in desktop computers was limited, which led to it eventually exiting desktops to focus solely on mobile. Toshiba remained one of the largest vendors in the market during the 2000s, and as of 2011 the company was selling 17.7 million PCs. However, it afterwards went into a steep decline, with sales falling to just 1.4 million in 2017 (a decline of over 90% in six years).

=== Sharp era ===
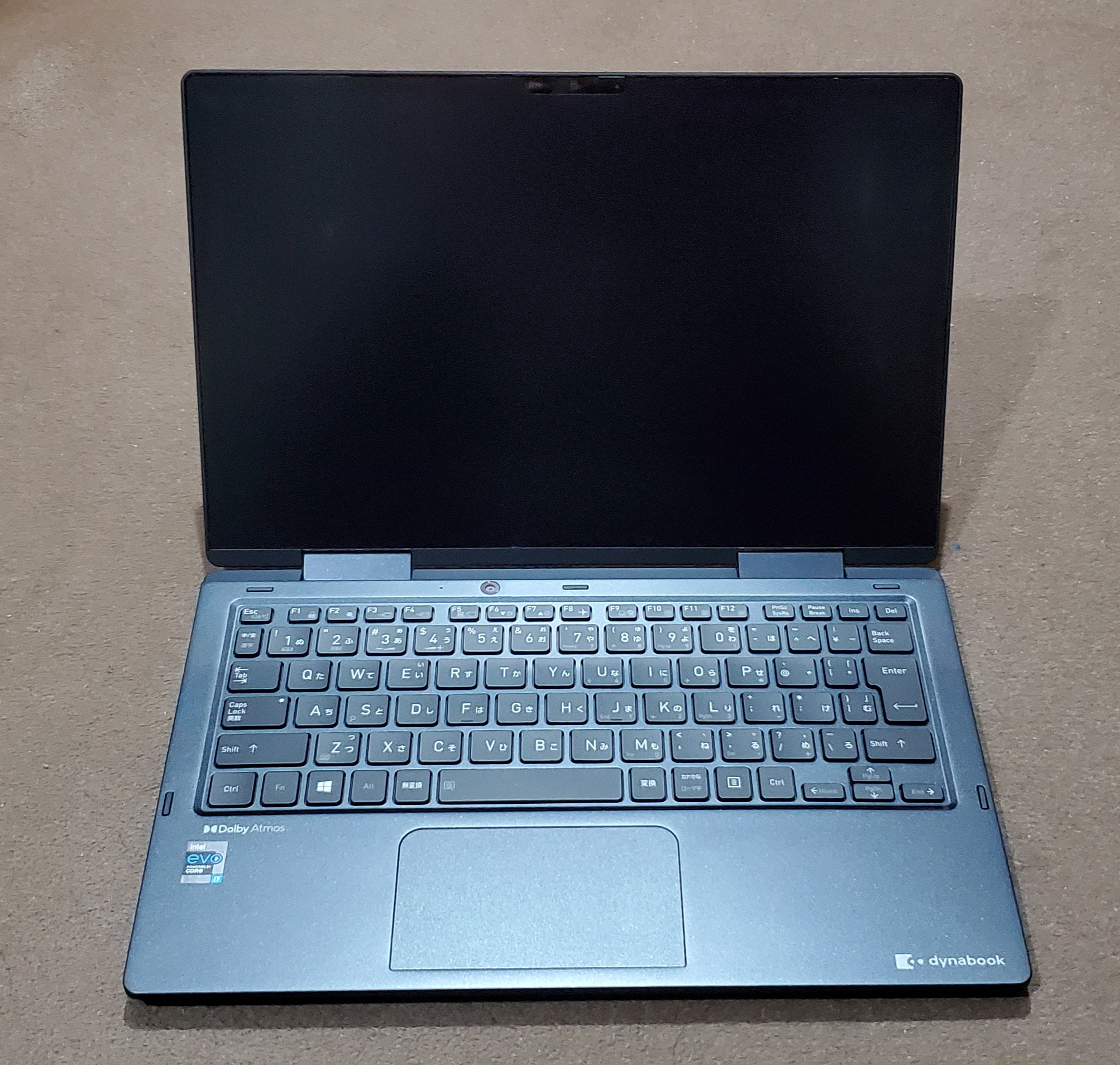
Dynabook Kira VZ83 (2020, Japan model, customized model)

With Toshiba in trouble amid an accounting scandal and under pressure to cut costs, it sold the majority of its PC business to Sharp Corporation. As a result, the company name and branding had changed to Dynabook effective in 2019. On the 30th anniversary of the original DynaBook launch in 1989, in July 2019, the first Dynabook-branded products in the West were launched: Portégé X30-F, Tecra X40-F and Portégé A30-E, as successors of previous generation Toshiba-branded models. Also. the Dynabook G series was announced for Japan as a celebration of the 30th anniversary of the brand. Dynabook have continued making very light laptops, especially in its premium Portégé line. They have since also released education-specific models and TAA-compliant models for government use.

In 2021, Dynabook released its first Chromebook called C1 for the Japanese market. As of FY 2022, Dynabook is the fifth largest PC vendor in Japan with a market share of 8%, trailing FCCL (Fujitsu), Dell, HP, and the leader NEC-Lenovo Group.

In February 2024, Dynabook announced a recall of millions of AC adapters shipped with Toshiba notebooks from 2008 to 2012 due to burn and fire hazards, offering to replace them for free.

== Product ranges ==
=== Current ===
- Portégé – premium business ultrabooks, formerly subnotebooks (1994–present)
- Tecra – business laptops (1994–present)
- Satellite Pro – budget-friendly and "business essential" laptops, formerly prosumer (1994–2016, 2020–present)
- E series – budget education-focused laptops and convertibles (2021–present)

==== Domestic Japanese market ====
- T series, T/X series, C series, Y series (home notebooks)
- R series, G series, GS series, S series, M series (mobile notebooks)
- V series, F series, K series (convertibles)
- DynaDesk (desktops)

=== Former ===
- Libretto – handheld subnotebooks (1996–2002, 2005, 2010)
- Qosmio – gaming laptops (2004–2014)
- Satellite – consumer laptops (1992–2016)
- T series – various portable computers and some desktop computers (1981–1995)
- Equium – business and professional laptops (1997-2010)
- Infinia – multimedia desktop computers (1996–1998)
- Brezza – desktop computers (–1998; Japanese market)
- PV – desktop computers (–1998; Japanese market)
- DynaTop – all-in-one computers (Japanese market)

== Brand logo history ==
Toshiba (1969-1984)

Toshiba worldwide brand (1984-2019)

DynaBook, for notebooks in Japan (1989–2003)

DynaBook logo used in Japan (2003–present), corporate logo for Dynabook Inc. and used globally (2019–present)

== Gallery of products ==
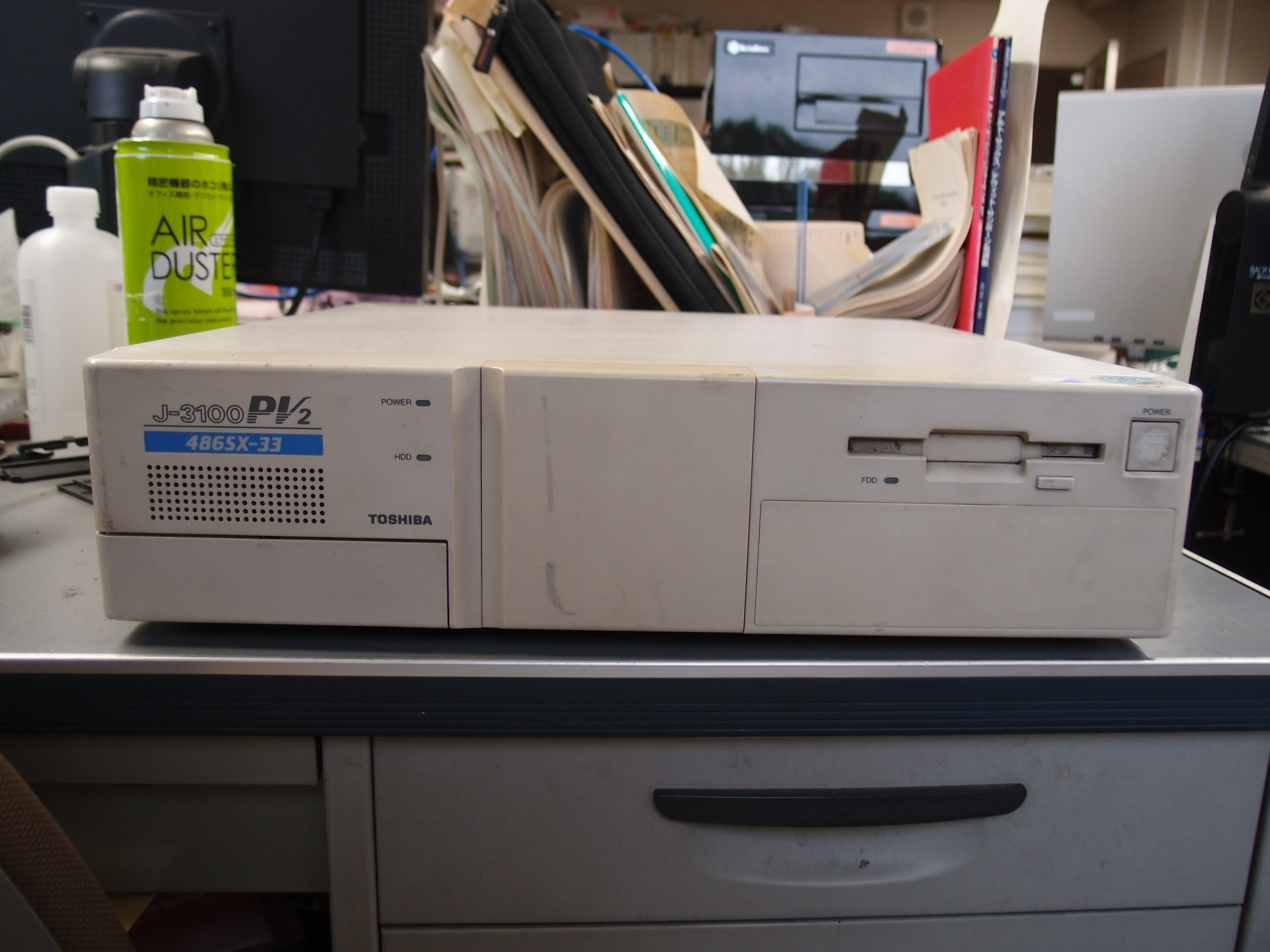
Toshiba J-3100PV2 Intel 486DX2 computer

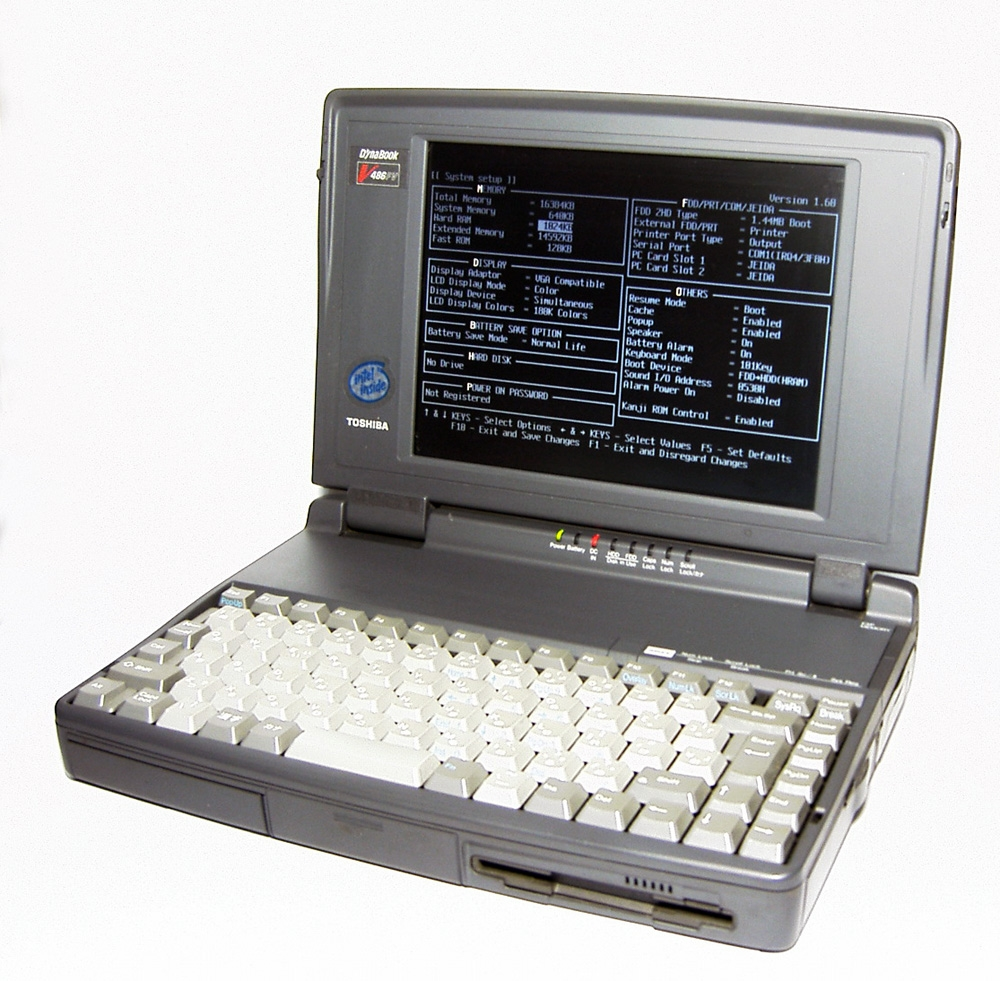
DynaBook FV475 501TW (1994)

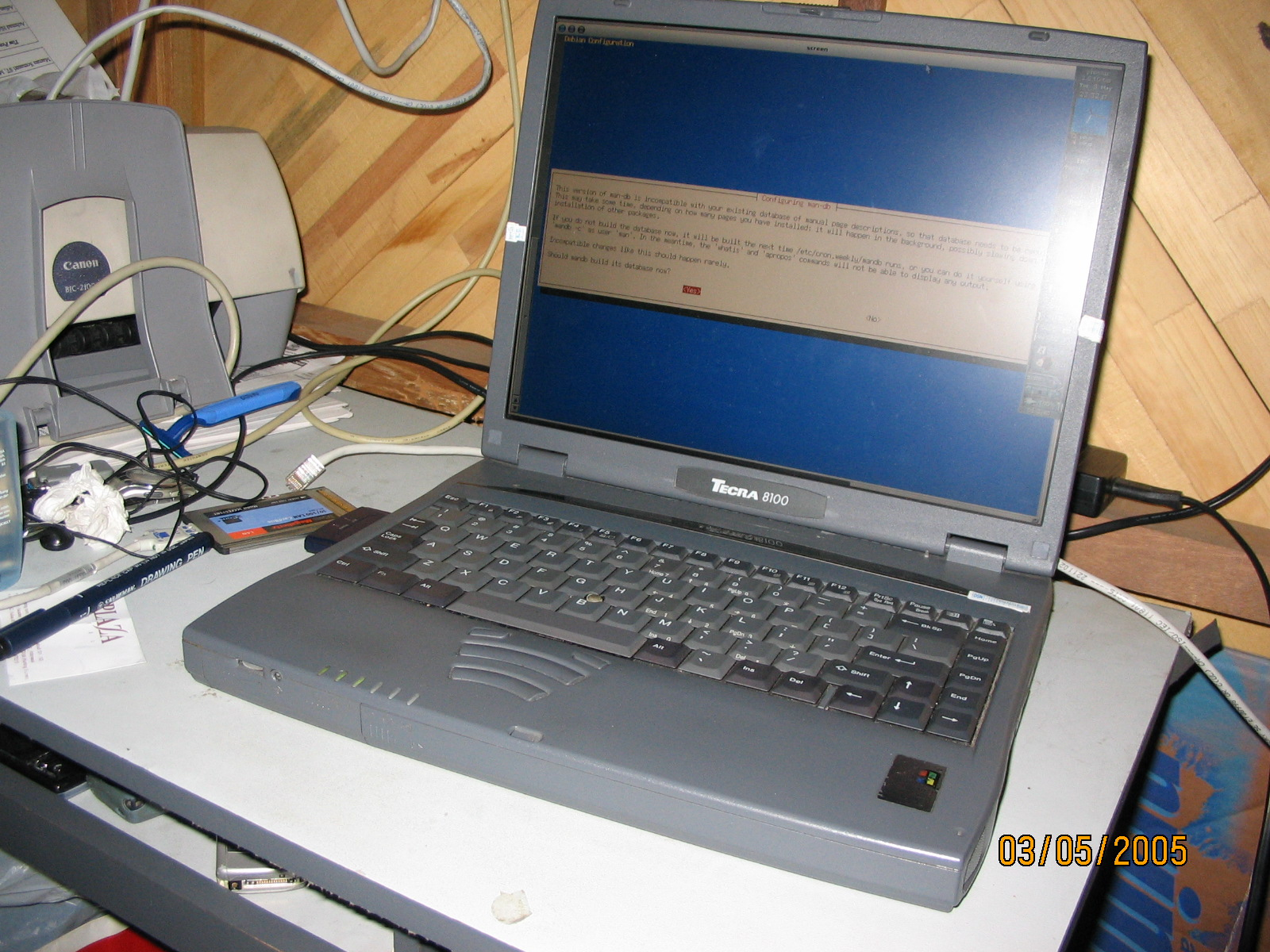
Toshiba Tecra 8100

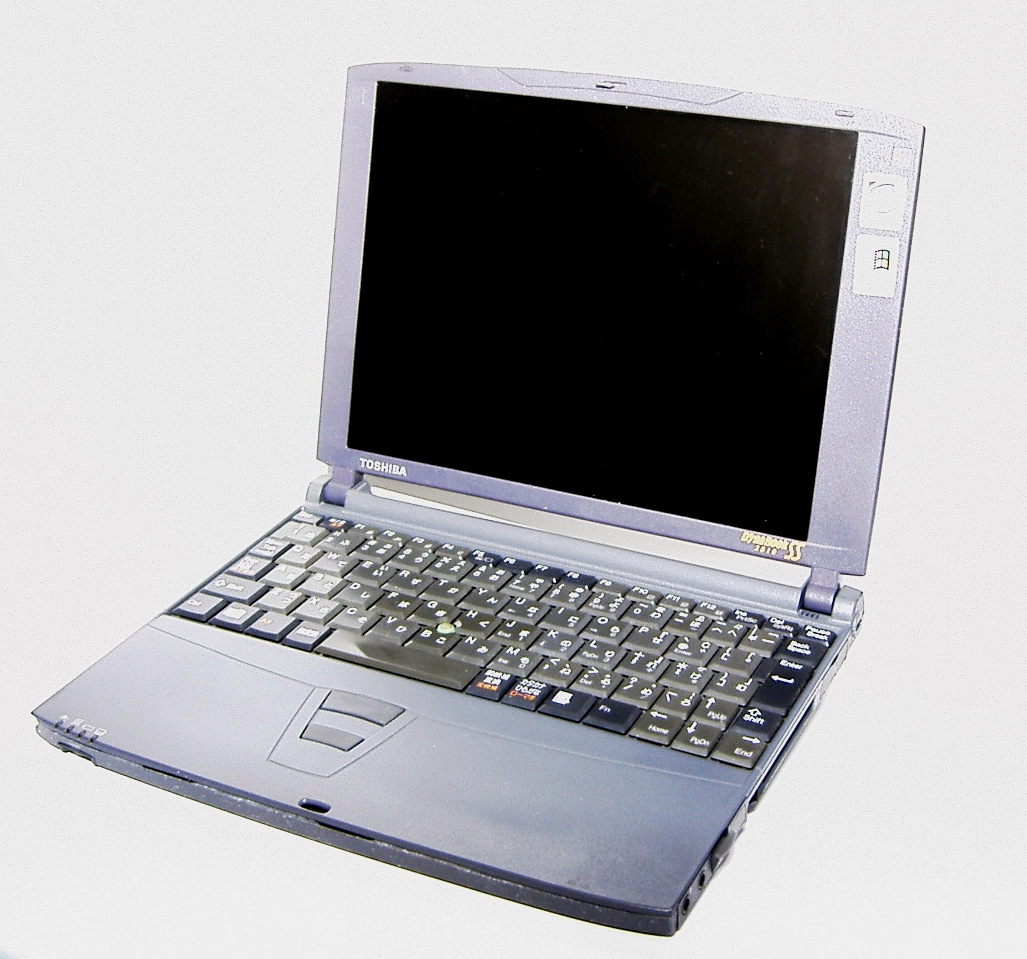
DynaBook SS 3010 (1998)

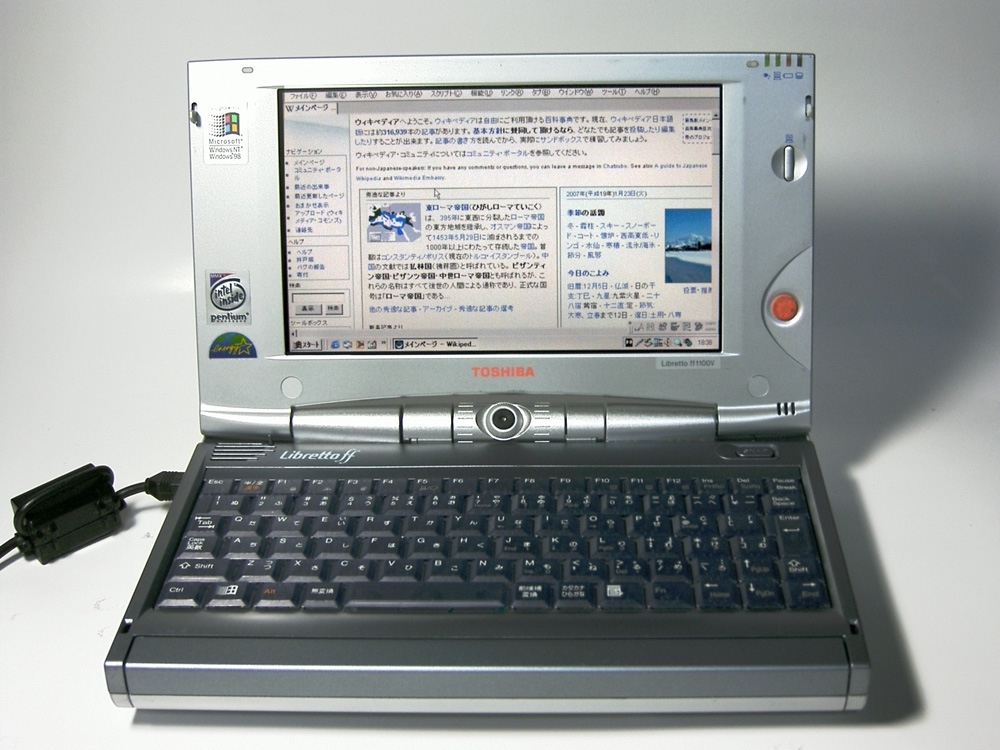
Toshiba Libretto ff 1000 (1999)

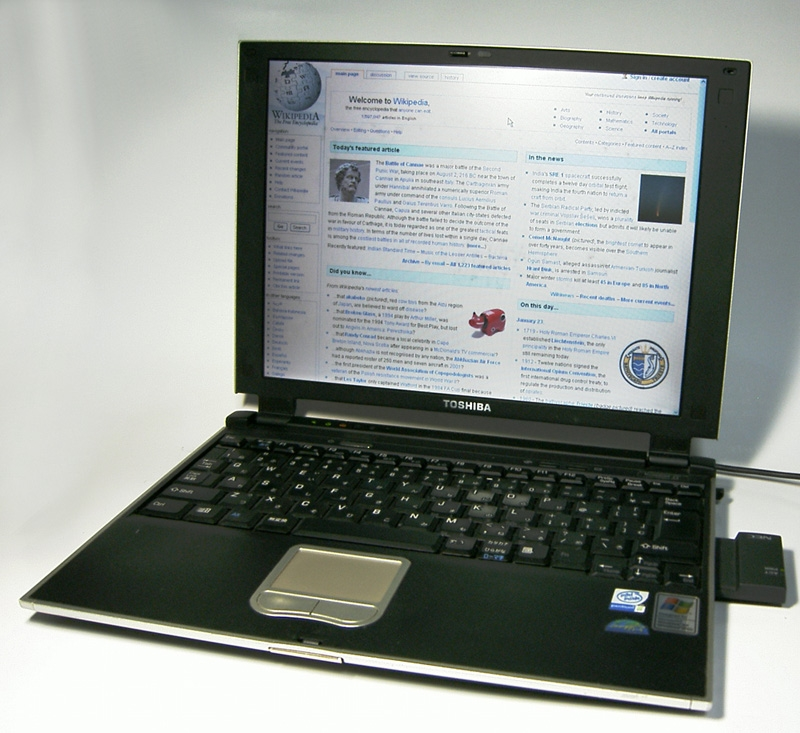
DynaBook SS 2000-DS80P (2001)

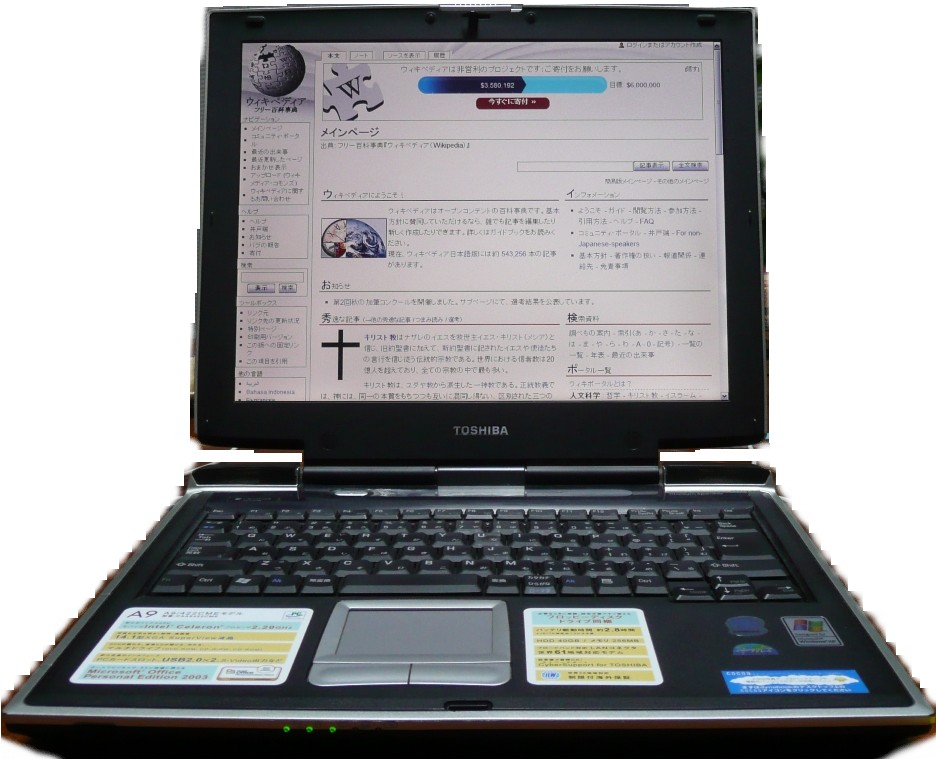
Dynabook A9 422CME (2003)

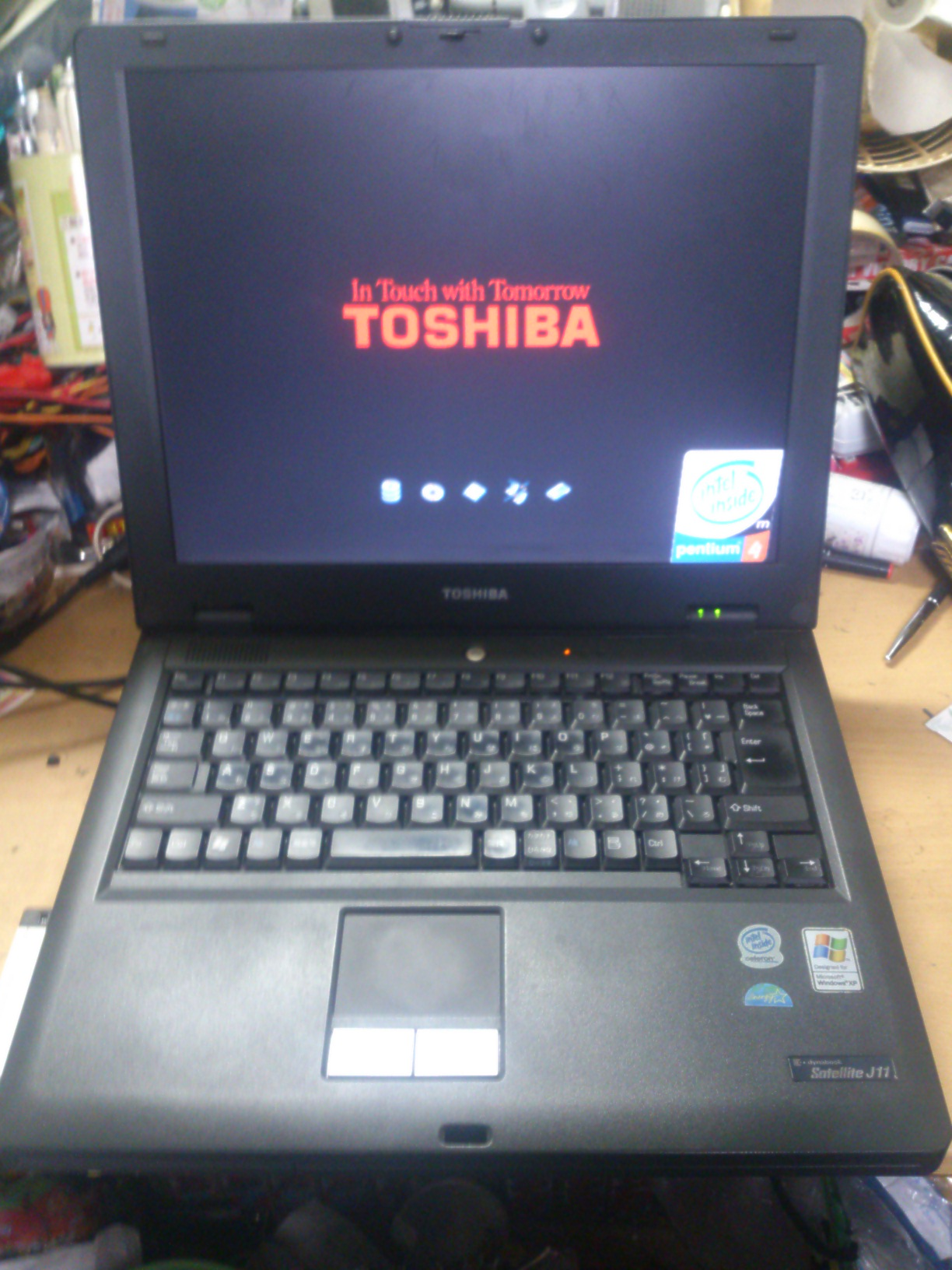
Dynabook Satellite J11 (2004)

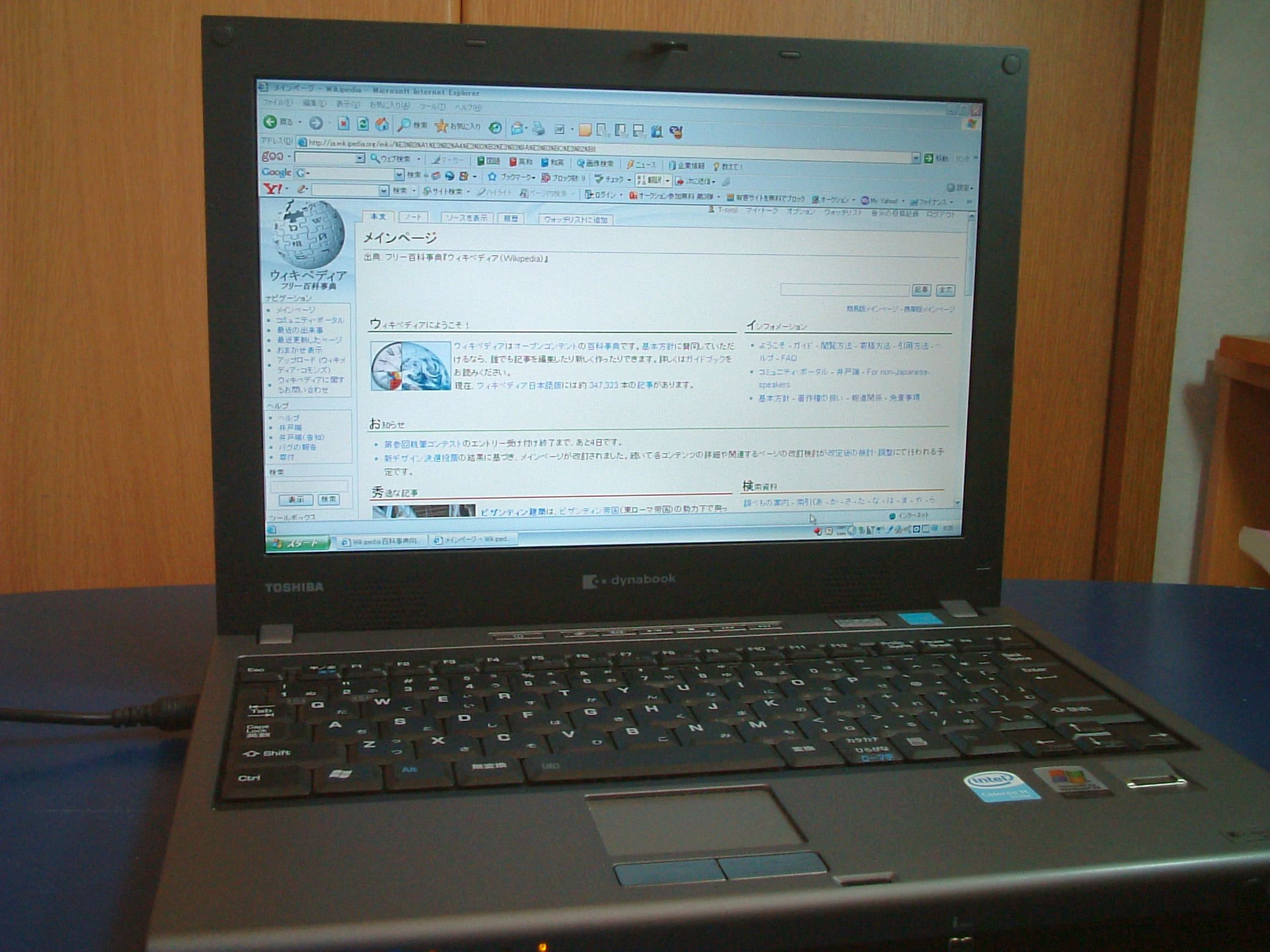
Dynabook SS MX/370LS (2006)

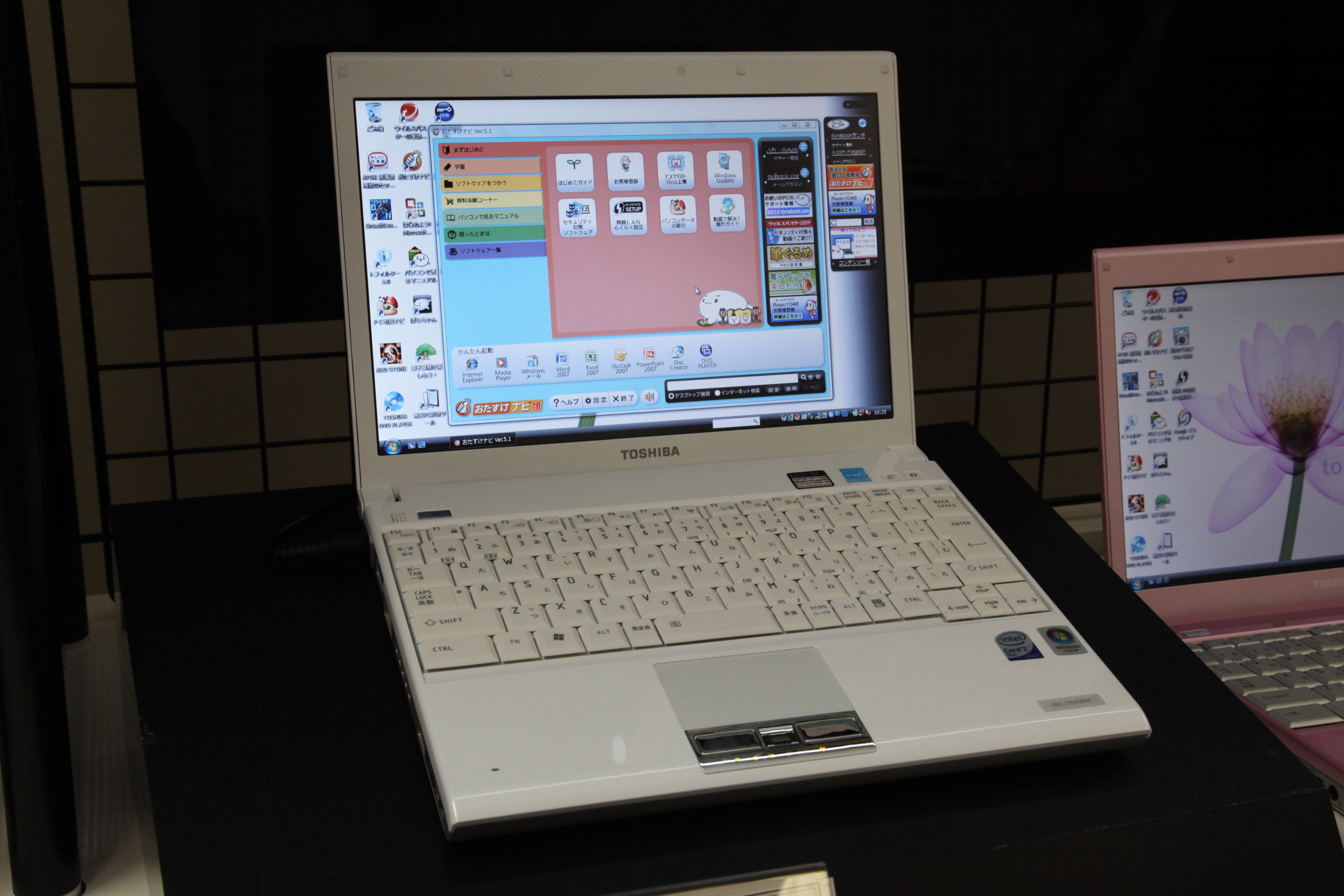
Dynabook NX / Toshiba Portégé A600 (2009)

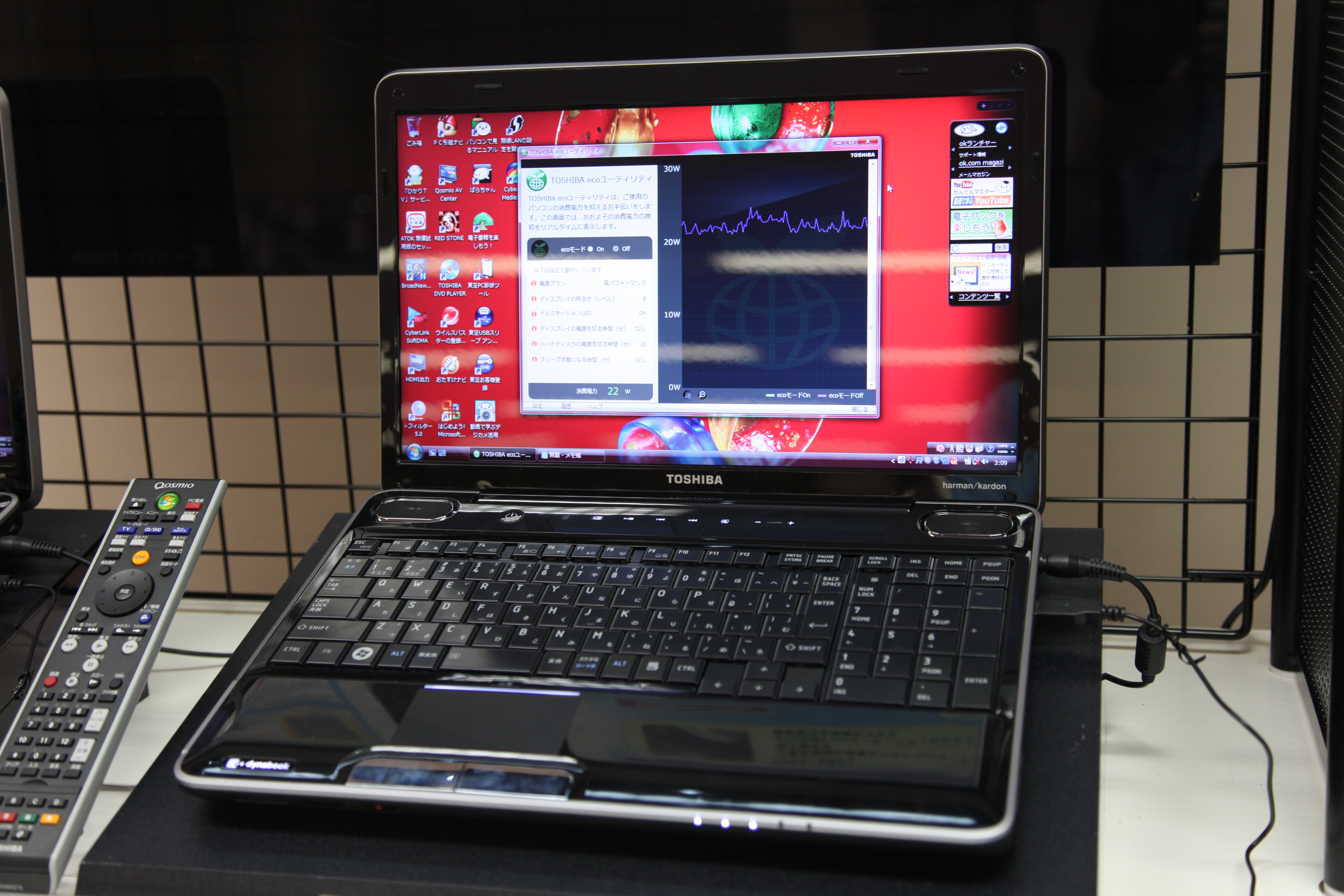
Dynabook TV / Toshiba Satellite A500 (2009)

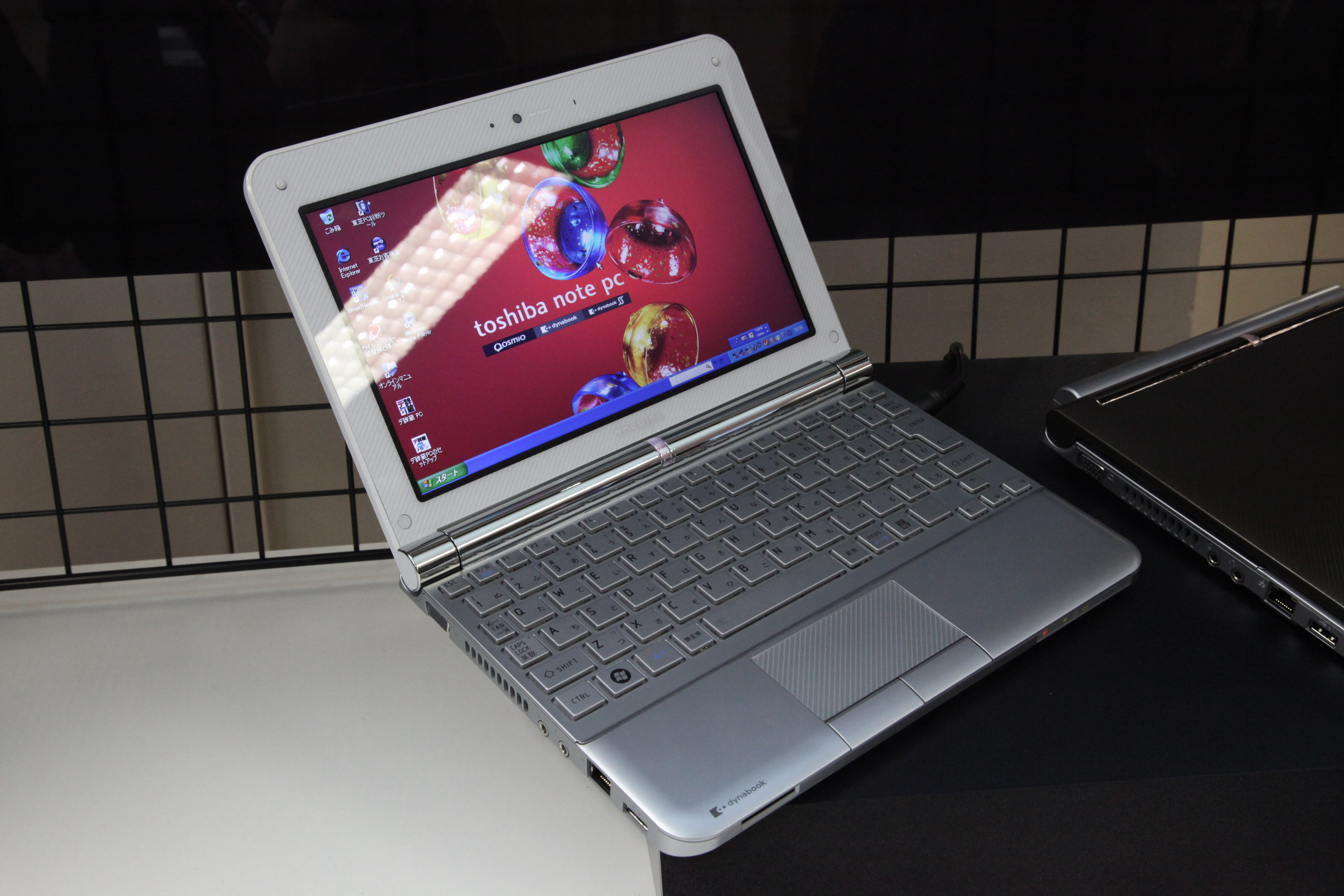
Dynabook UX / Toshiba NB200 (2009)

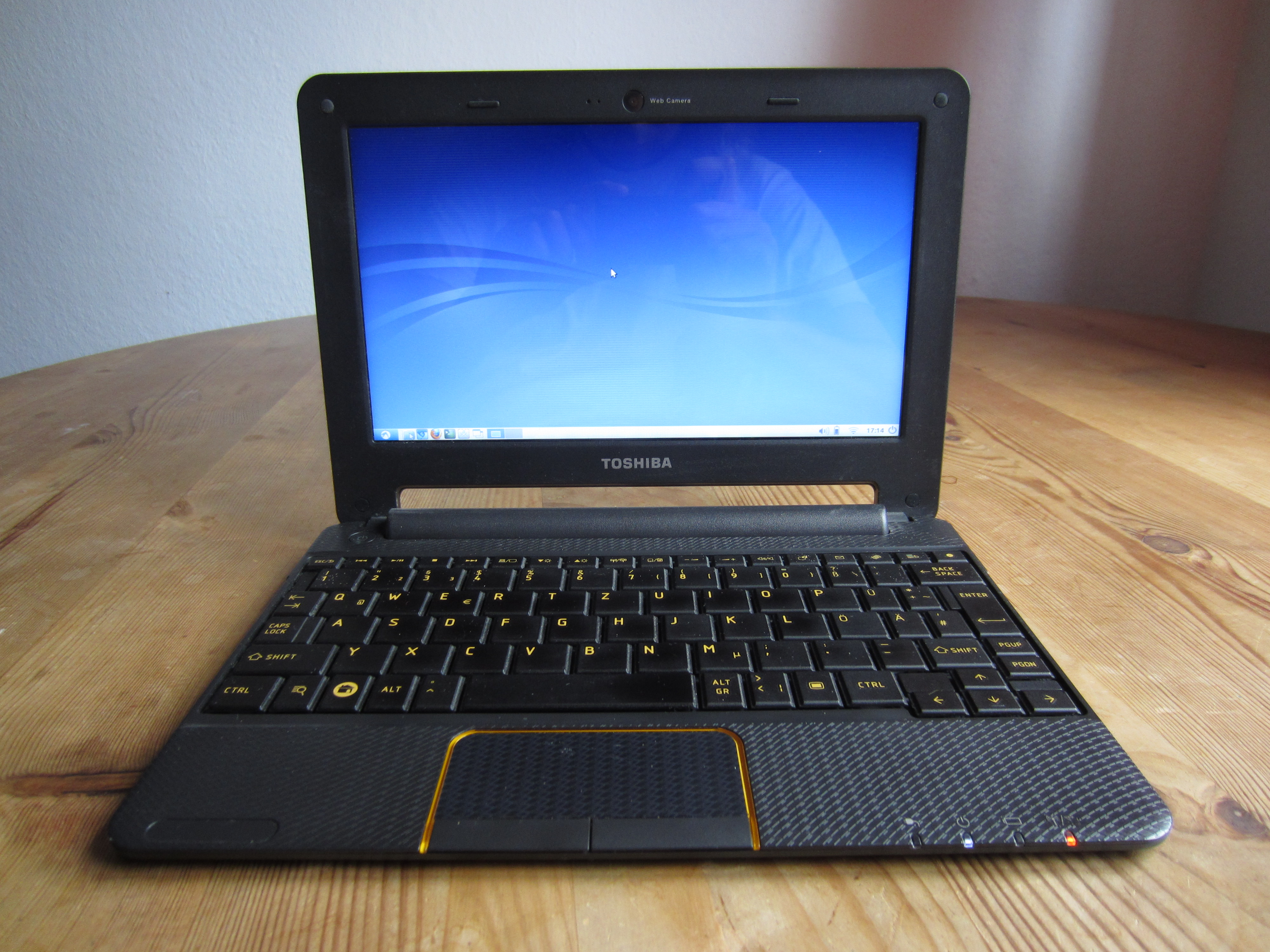
Toshiba AC100 (2010)

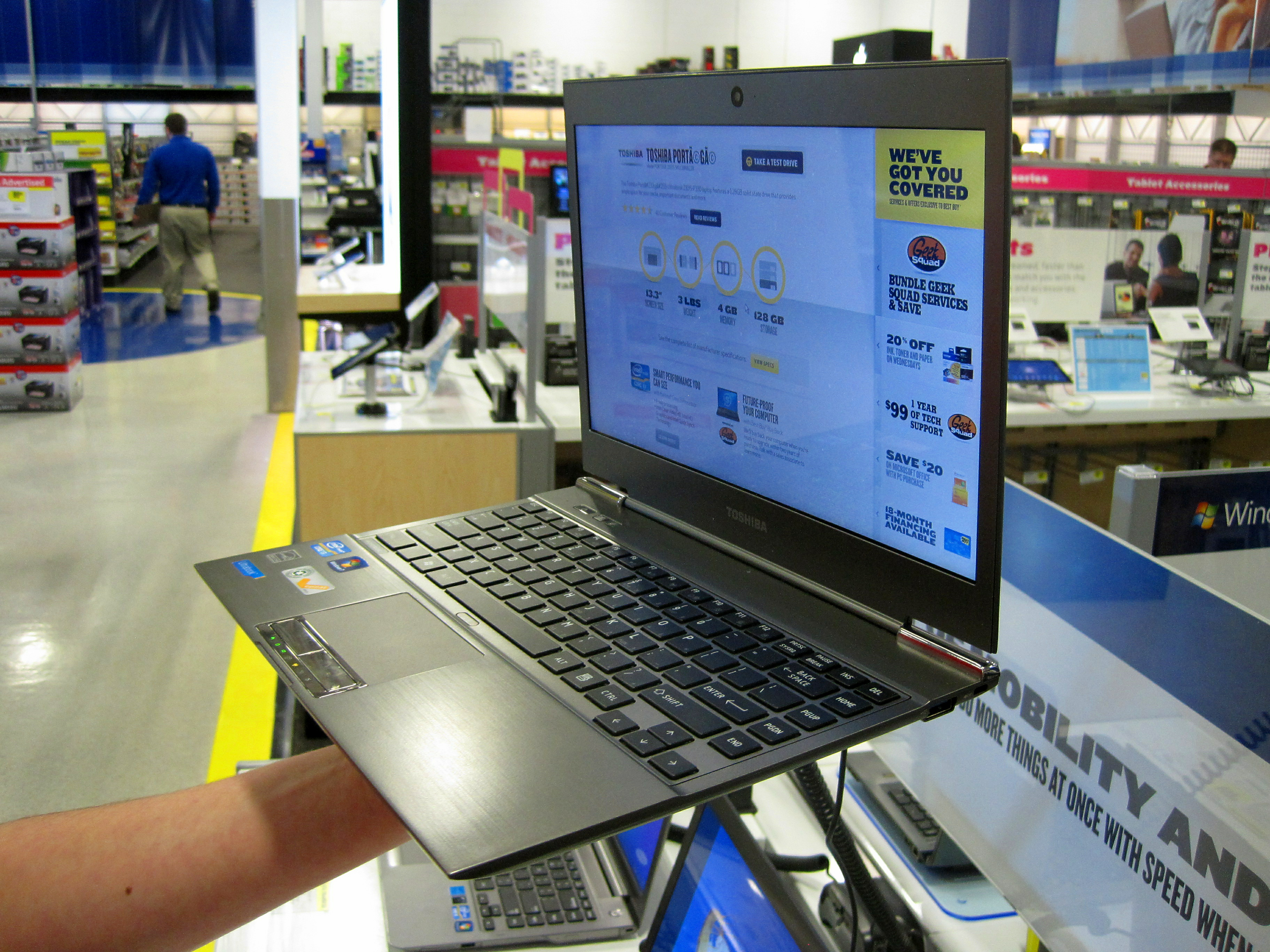
Toshiba Portégé Z830 (2011)
