= Toshiba T series =

Personal computers sold internationally

- Developer: Toshiba Information Systems Corporation
- Type: Portable computer; Laptop computer; Desktop computer
- Released: 1981
- Discontinued: 1995

The Toshiba T series comprises personal computers sold internationally by the Japanese electronics conglomerate Toshiba, under their Information Systems subsidiary (now known as Dynabook Inc.), from 1981 to 1995.

The T series began with desktop computers such as the T100 and T300, both of which were rebranded Pasopia models from Japan for United States markets. Starting with the fast-selling Toshiba T1100 laptop, the vast majority of succeeding entries in the T series comprised portable computers, including laptops, luggables, and notebooks, as Toshiba had largely abandoned the international desktop market, where they had failed to gain much uptake. The T prefix denotes models sold exclusively outside of Japan; within Japan, Toshiba sold these computers with the J prefix instead.

Beginning with Toshiba's T1800 laptop in 1992, Toshiba began introducing brand names to go alongside certain T-series models (in the T1800's case, Satellite). This practice continued until June 1995, when Toshiba's computer division imposed a nomenclature reset which removed the T prefix and dictated that all succeeding models have a brand name.

== Models ==
=== Portables ===
Toshiba T series portable models
Model	Release date	Processor	Clock speed (MHz)	Display technology	Display size (in.)	Display resolution	Stock RAM (max.)	HDD	Notes/ref(s).
DynaPad T100X	July 1993	AMD 386SX-LV	25	Monochrome STN LCD	9.5	VGA (640×480)	4 MB (20 MB)	40 MB	Tablet computer
T1000	September 1987	Intel 80C88	4.77	Monochrome STN LCD (reflective)	9.8	CGA (640×200)	512 KB (768 KB)	None (1 FDD)	
T1000LE	November 1990	Intel 80C86	9.54	Monochrome STN LCD	Unknown	CGA (640×400)	1 MB (9 MB)	20 MB	RAM above 1 MB treated as RAM disk
T1000SE	January 1990	Intel 80C86	8	Monochrome STN LCD	Unknown	CGA (640×200)	1000 KB	None (1 FDD)	
T1000XE	March 1990	Intel 80C86	9.54	Monochrome STN LCD	Unknown	CGA (640×400)	1 MB (3 MB)	20 MB	RAM above 1 MB treated as RAM disk
T1100	November 1985	Intel 80C88	4.77	Monochrome STN LCD (reflective)	Unknown	CGA (640×200)	512 KB	None (1 FDD)	
T1100 Plus	March 1986	Intel 80C88	7.16/4.77 (switchable)	Monochrome STN LCD (reflective)	Unknown	CGA (640×200)	256 KB (640 KB)	None (2 FDD)	
T1200 FB	August 1987	Intel 80C88	9.54/4.77 (switchable)	Monochrome STN LCD	9.52	CGA (640×200)	1 MB	None (2 FDD)	
T1200 HD	August 1987	Intel 80C88	9.54/4.77 (switchable)	Monochrome STN LCD	9.52	CGA (640×200)	1 MB	20 MB	
T1200XE	March 1990	Intel 80286	12	Monochrome STN LCD	Unknown	CGA (640×400)	1 MB (5 MB)	20 MB	
T1600	January 1989	Intel 80C286	16	Monochrome STN LCD	Unknown	CGA (640×200)	640 KB (2.5 MB)	20 MB	
Satellite T1800	August 1992	Intel 386SX	20	Monochrome DSTN LCD	9.5	VGA (640×480)	2 MB (10 MB)	60 MB	
Satellite T1850	August 1992	Intel 386SX	25	Monochrome DSTN LCD	9.5	VGA (640×480)	4 MB (12 MB)	80 MB	
Satellite T1850C	August 1992	Intel 386SX	25	Color DSTN LCD	9.5	VGA (640×480)	4 MB (12 MB)	80 MB	
Satellite T1900	May 1993	Intel 486SX	20	Monochrome DSTN LCD	9.5	VGA (640×480)	4 MB (20 MB)	80 MB or 120 MB or 200 MB	
Satellite T1900C	May 1993	Intel 486SX	20	Color DSTN LCD	9.5	VGA (640×480)	4 MB (20 MB)	120 MB or 200 MB	
Satellite T1910	January 1994	Intel 486SX	33	Monochrome DSTN LCD	9.5	VGA (640×480)	4 MB (20 MB)	120 MB	
Satellite T1910CS	January 1994	Intel 486SX	33	Monochrome DSTN LCD	9.5	VGA (640×480)	4 MB (20 MB)	120 MB	
Satellite T1950	September 1993	Intel 486DX2	40	Monochrome DSTN LCD	9.5	VGA (640×480)	4 MB (20 MB)	120 MB or 200 MB or 320 MB	
Satellite T1950CS	September 1993	Intel 486DX2	40	Color DSTN LCD	9.5	VGA (640×480)	4 MB (20 MB)	120 MB or 200 MB or 320 MB	
Satellite T1950CT	September 1993	Intel 486DX2	40	Color active-matrix LCD	8.4	VGA (640×480)	4 MB (20 MB)	120 MB or 200 MB or 320 MB	
Satellite T1960CS	July 1994	Intel 486DX2	50	Color DSTN LCD	9.5	VGA (640×480)	4 MB (20 MB)	200 MB	
Satellite T1960CT	July 1994	Intel 486DX2	50	Color active-matrix LCD	8.4	VGA (640×480)	8 MB (20 MB)	320 MB	
DynaPad T200	March 1994	Intel 486DX2	40	Monochrome DSTN LCD (reflective)	9.5	VGA (640×480)	4 MB (20 MB)	80 MB	Tablet computer
DynaPad T200CS	March 1994	Intel 486DX2	40	Color DSTN LCD	9.5	VGA (640×480)	4 MB (20 MB)	80 MB	Tablet computer
T2000	July 1991	Intel 80C286	12	Monochrome DSTN LCD	Unknown	VGA (640×480)	1 MB (9 MB)	40 MB	
T2000SX	July 1991	Intel 386SX	20	Monochrome DSTN LCD	Unknown	VGA (640×480)	1 MB (10 MB)	20 MB or 40 MB or 60 MB	
T2000SXe	July 1991	Intel 386SX	20	Monochrome DSTN LCD	Unknown	VGA (640×480)	2 MB (10 MB)	40 MB or 60 MB	
Satellite T2100	March 1995	Intel 486DX2	50	Monochrome DSTN LCD	9.5	VGA (640×480)	4 MB (28 MB)	250 MB	
Satellite T2100CS	March 1995	Intel 486DX2	50	Color DSTN LCD	10.4	VGA (640×480)	4 MB (28 MB)	250 MB	
Satellite T2100CT	March 1995	Intel 486DX2	50	Color active-matrix LCD	8.4	VGA (640×480)	4 MB (28 MB)	250 MB	
Satellite T2110CS	June 1995	Intel 486DX4	75	Color DSTN LCD	10.4	VGA (640×480)	4 MB (28 MB)	350 MB	
Satellite T2130CS	June 1995	Intel 486DX4	75	Color DSTN LCD	10.4	VGA (640×480)	4 MB (28 MB)	520 MB	
Satellite T2130CT	June 1995	Intel 486DX4	75	Color active-matrix LCD	10.4	VGA (640×480)	4 MB (28 MB)	520 MB	
Satellite Pro T2150CDS	April 1995	Intel 486DX4	75	Color DSTN LCD	10.4	VGA (640×480)	4 MB (28 MB)	500 MB	
Satellite Pro T2150CDT	April 1995	Intel 486DX4	75	Color active-matrix LCD	10.4	VGA (640×480)	4 MB (28 MB)	500 MB	
T2200SX	September 1991	Intel 386SX	20	Monochrome DSTN LCD	9.5	VGA (640×480)	4 MB (28 MB)	2 MB (10 MB)	40 MB or 60 MB
Satellite T2400CS	July 1994	Intel 486DX2	50	Color DSTN LCD	9.5	VGA (640×480)	4 MB (20 MB)	250 MB	
Satellite T2400CT	July 1994	Intel 486DX2	50	Color active-matrix LCD	8.4	VGA (640×480)	8 MB (24 MB)	320 MB	
Satellite Pro T2450CT	December 1994	Intel 486DX4	75	Color active-matrix LCD	9.5	VGA (640×480)	8 MB (32 MB)	320 MB or 500 MB	
T3100	April 1986	Intel 80286	8	Monochrome plasma display	9.5	CGA (640×400)	640 KB (1 MB)	10 MB	
T3100/20	August 1987	Intel 80286	8	Monochrome plasma display	9.5	CGA (640×400)	640 KB (1 MB)	20 MB	
T3100e	November 1988	Intel 80286	12	Monochrome plasma display	9.5	CGA (640×400)	1 KB (5 MB)	20 MB	
T3100e/40	October 1989	Intel 80286	12	Monochrome plasma display	9.5	CGA (640×400)	1 KB (5 MB)	40 MB	
T3100SX	December 1989	Intel 386SX	16	Monochrome plasma display	9.5	VGA (640×480)	1 MB (13 MB)	40 MB	
T3200	April 1988	Intel 80286	12	Monochrome plasma display	9.5	CGA (640×400)	1 MB (4 MB)	40 MB	
T3200SX	September 1989	Intel 386SX	16	Monochrome plasma display	9.5	VGA (640×480)	1 MB (13 MB)	40 MB	
T3200SXC	March 1991	Intel 386SX	20	Color active-matrix LCD	10.4	VGA (640×480)	1 MB (13 MB)	120 MB	
T3300SL	January 1992	Intel 386SL	25	Monochrome DSTN LCD	Unknown	VGA (640×480)	2 MB (18 MB)	85 MB	
Portégé T3400	November 1993	Intel 486SX	33	Monochrome DSTN LCD	8.4	VGA (640×480)	4 MB (20 MB)	120 MB	
Portégé T3400CT	November 1993	Intel 486SX	33	Color active-matrix LCD	8.4	VGA (640×480)	4 MB (20 MB)	120 MB	
Portégé T3600CT	July 1994	Intel 486DX2	50	Color active-matrix LCD	8.4	VGA (640×480)	8 MB (24 MB)	250 MB	
T4400SX	December 1991	Intel 486SX or 486	25	Monochrome DSTN LCD or monochrome plasma display	9.5	VGA (640×480)	2 MB (10 MB)	85 MB	First notebook-sized laptop with an optional 486 processor, as well as the first notebook with a plasma display
T4400SXC	April 1992	Intel 486SX or 486	25	Color active-matrix LCD	8.4	VGA (640×480)	4 MB (20 MB)	80 MB	
T4400	November 1992	Intel 486SX or 486	25	Monochrome DSTN LCD	9.5	VGA (640×480)	4 MB (20 MB)	120 MB (486SX) or 200 MB (486)	
T4400C	November 1992	Intel 486SX or 486	25	Color active-matrix LCD	9.5	VGA (640×480)	4 MB (20 MB)	120 MB (486SX) or 200 MB (486)	
T4500	December 1992	Intel 486SX	20	Monochrome DSTN LCD	9.5	VGA (640×480)	4 MB (20 MB)	80 MB	
T4500C	January 1993	Intel 486SX	20	Color active-matrix LCD	8.4	VGA (640×480)	4 MB (20 MB)	120 MB	
T4600	June 1993	Intel 486SL	33	Monochrome DSTN LCD	9.5	VGA (640×480)	4 MB (20 MB)	120 MB or 200 MB or 320 MB	
T4600C	June 1993	Intel 486SL	33	Color active-matrix LCD	9.5	VGA (640×480)	4 MB (20 MB)	120 MB or 200 MB or 320 MB	
T4700CS	November 1993	Intel 486DX2	50	Color DSTN LCD	9.5	VGA (640×480)	8 MB (24 MB)	200 MB or 320 MB	
T4700CT	November 1993	Intel 486DX2	50	Color active-matrix LCD	9.5	VGA (640×480)	8 MB (24 MB)	200 MB or 320 MB	
T4800CT	March 1994	Intel 486DX4	75	Color active-matrix LCD	9.5	VGA (640×480)	8 MB (24 MB)	500 MB	Includes built-in Windows Sound System–compatible audio system with microphone
T4850CT	November 1994	Intel 486DX4	75	Color active-matrix LCD	10.4	VGA (640×480)	8 MB (40 MB)	500 MB or 770 MB	Includes built-in Windows Sound System–compatible audio system with microphone
T4900CT	November 1994	Intel Pentium	75	Color active-matrix LCD	10.4	VGA (640×480)	8 MB (40 MB)	770 MB	First notebook-sized laptop with a Pentium processor; includes built-in Windows Sound System–compatible audio system with microphone
T5100	April 1988	Intel 386	16/8 (switchable)	Monochrome plasma display	9.5	CGA (640×400)	2 MB (4 MB)	40 MB	
T5200	April 1989	Intel 386	20	Monochrome plasma display	11.5	CGA (640×400)	2 MB (8 MB)	40 MB or 100 MB or 200 MB	
T5200C	October 1990	Intel 386	20	Color DSTN LCD	10.4	VGA (640×480)	2 MB (14 MB)	200 MB	
T6400SX	February 1992	Intel 486SX	25	Monochrome plasma display	10.4	VGA (640×480)	4 MB (20 MB)	120 MB	
T6400SXC	February 1992	Intel 486SX	25	Color active-matrix LCD	10.4	VGA (640×480)	4 MB (20 MB)	120 MB	
T6400DX	February 1992	Intel 486	33	Monochrome plasma display	10.4	VGA (640×480)	4 MB (20 MB)	200 MB	
T6400DXC	March 1992	Intel 486	33	Color active-matrix LCD	10.4	VGA (640×480)	4 MB (20 MB)	200 MB	
T6400	February 1992	Intel 486DX2	50	Monochrome plasma display	10.4	VGA (640×480)	4 MB (20 MB)	200 MB	
T6400C	November 1992	Intel 486DX2	50	Color active-matrix LCD	10.4	VGA (640×480)	4 MB (20 MB)	120 MB	
T6400MM	November 1992	Intel 486DX2	50	Color active-matrix LCD	10.4	VGA (640×480)	4 MB (20 MB)	120 MB	Includes Intel Digital Video Interactive–compatible video adapter and portable speakers
T6600C	July 1993	Intel 486DX2	66	Color active-matrix LCD	10.4	VGA (640×480)	8 MB (72 MB)	510 MB or 1.3 GB	Built-in SCSI interface
T6600C/CD	July 1993	Intel 486DX2	66	Color active-matrix LCD	10.4	VGA (640×480)	8 MB (72 MB)	510 MB or 1.3 GB	Built-in SCSI interface and CD-ROM drive
T6600C/CDV	July 1993	Intel 486DX2	66	Color active-matrix LCD	10.4	VGA (640×480)	8 MB (72 MB)	510 MB or 1.3 GB	Built-in SCSI interface, CD-ROM drive, MediaShare Mambo Digital Video Interface video adapter, and Ethernet card

=== Desktops ===
Toshiba T series desktop models
Model	Release date	Processor	Clock speed (MHz)	Display technology	Display size (in.)	Display resolution	Stock RAM (max.)	HDD	Notes/ref(s).
T100	January 1982	Zilog Z80A	4	Monochrome TN LCD (reflective, optional)	Unknown	8 lines of text (LCD)	64 KB	—N/a	CP/M-compatible home computer; U.S. rebrand of Japan-exclusive Pasopia
T200	November 1981	Intel 8085A	Unknown	—N/a	—N/a	—N/a	64 KB	—N/a	CP/M-compatible home computer; dual 5.25-inch floppy disk drives
T250	November 1981	Intel 8085A	Unknown	—N/a	—N/a	—N/a	64 KB	—N/a	CP/M-compatible home computer; dual 8-inch floppy disk drives
T300	June 1983	Intel 8088	4.77	—N/a	—N/a	—N/a	192 KB (512 KB)	—N/a	Keyboard computer; Toshiba's first IBM PC compatible; U.S. rebrand of Japan-exclusive Pasopia 16
T8500 Model 20	December 1989	Intel 386	20	—N/a	—N/a	—N/a	2 MB (16 MB)	100 MB	Desktop computer; Toshiba's first desktop-unit PC compatible
T8500 Model 25	December 1989	Intel 386	25	—N/a	—N/a	—N/a	2 MB (16 MB)	100 MB	Desktop computer; Toshiba's first desktop-unit PC compatible
