= Toshiba T1000LE =

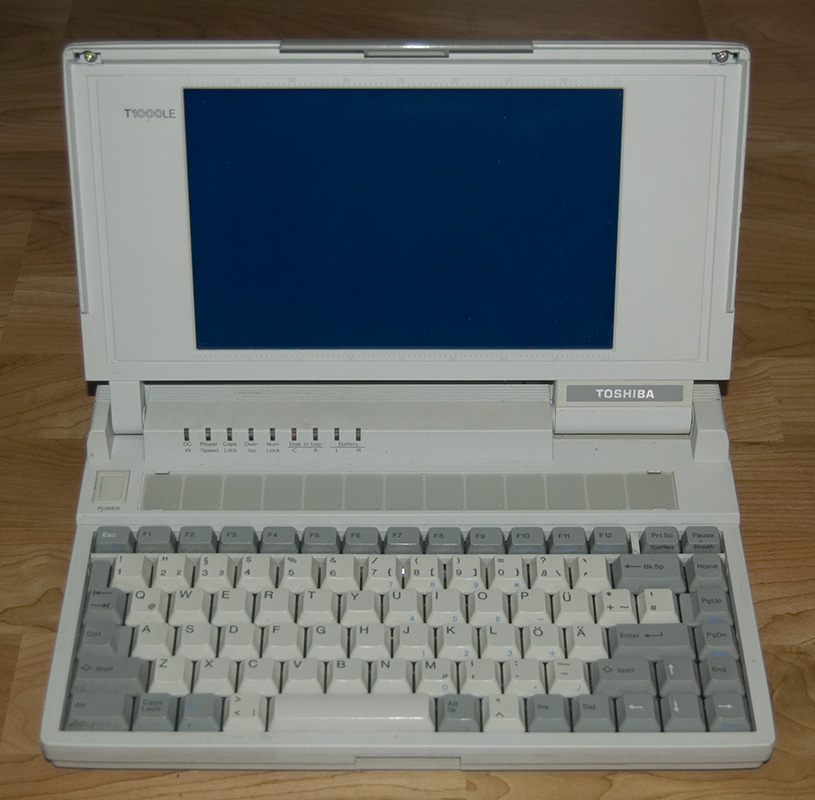
- Manufacturer: Toshiba Corporation
- Product family: Toshiba T series
- Type: Laptop
- Released: 1990; 36 years ago
- Operating system: MS-DOS 3.3/4.01 (chosen at purchase)
- CPU: Intel 80C86 @ 4.77/9.54 MHz (switchable with keyboard)
- Storage: 20 MB Hard Drive
- Graphics: Text Mode (80 Columns, 25 Rows), CGA resolution (320x200), Toshiba Graphics (640x400); 32k VRAM
- Sound: PC Speaker
- Predecessor: Toshiba T1200
- Successor: Toshiba T3100
- Related: Toshiba T1000; Toshiba T1100

The Toshiba T1000LE was a laptop manufactured by Toshiba starting in 1990 as a member of their LE/SE/XE family. It used a 9.54/4.77 MHz Intel 80C86, with the clock speed being switchable by using function keys on the keyboard. The laptop came with a 20 MB hard drive, 1 MB of RAM, a 1.44M/720K switchable 3.5" floppy drive, and a blue-on-white, back-lit, "Toshiba Graphics" 640x400 STN LCD. The laptop came with a choice of either MS-DOS 3.3 or 4.01 stored in a socketed ROM. The laptop's RAM was expandable to 2 MB, 3 MB, 5 MB, or 9 MB with 1 MB, 2 MB, 4 MB, and 8 MB proprietary memory cards, respectively.

The Toshiba T1000LE was discontinued prior to 1994.

== Specifications ==
CPU	Intel 80C86
Battery	Ni-CD, 2200MAh or 1700MAh
Hard Drive	20 MB
RAM	1 MB
Sound	Internal PC Speaker

== Features ==
The Toshiba T1000LE was one of the first laptops to include both a hard drive and a Ni-CD battery. Previous laptops did not have enough power to run a hard drive from battery power (exceptions include the Toshiba T1200, which had a proprietary 26-pin JVC hard drive, and the Macintosh Portable, which used a lead-acid battery, instead of a Ni-CD).

The laptop has a notable lack of expansion ports, consisting of a RS-232 port, a printer port, and the docking connector. The computer used the docking connector to connect to a Toshiba DeskStation II, giving it extra capabilities.

Unlike the original Toshiba T1000, this model does not have a handle that flips out of the bottom, nor a display that tilts 180 degrees.

== Reliability Problems ==
As these laptops age further, with the oldest models being over 30 years old now, reliability becomes more of an issue. These laptops have a few known issues, none of which have a known fix as of yet. Most of these problems plague many other Toshiba portables from the era.

The most common of these issues is where the system will boot for about 1 second and then turn off again, with a power supply error indicated by the LEDs. It is suspected this is damage caused by leaking electrolytic capacitors in the system. All of these models will have leaking capacitors on the motherboard, so it is important to replace them and clean the area near their original placement as soon as possible.

The original Conner 20 MB 2.5" HDD is also known to have a failure common with other small hard drives of the era, where the rubber gasket sealing the drive can rot away, exposing the platters to air and gumming them up with a difficult to remove gooey substance. The drives are practically unrepairable once this happens, and the data can only be recovered by a data recovery specialist.

There is some debate as to whether or not these models need a good Ni-CD battery to boot.

== See also ==
- ELKS
- Intel 8086
- MS-DOS
- Toshiba T1000
