= MM10 =

MM10 may refer to:

- Mega Man 10, a 2010 video game in the Mega Man series
- Might & Magic X: Legacy, a 2014 video role-playing game in the Might & Magic series
- Novation MM10, a companion keyboard for the Yamaha QY10 workstation
- Sharp Actius MM10 Muramasas, a laptop computer.
- A standard used by the Multimedia Messaging Service in mobile networks, see MMS Architecture
- A mouse reference genome released in 2011
