= Sharp WideNote =

Series of laptops by Sharp Corporation

WideNote
- Developer: Sharp Corporation
- Manufacturer: Sharp Corporation
- Type: Subnotebook
- Released: October 1996; 29 years ago
- Lifespan: 1996–1997, 2005–2006
- CPU: Pentium at 133 MHz (W-100 series); Pentium M at 1.73 GHz (M4000)
- Memory: Up to 32 MB (W-100 series); Up to 1.5 GB (M4000)

WideNote is a line of subnotebooks released by Sharp Corporation. The line comprises the W-100T and W-100D, both released in 1996, and the M4000, released in 2005. The W-100 series was the first laptop with a color widescreen LCD, with a roughly 16:9 aspect ratio. The W-100 series features a Pentium processor clocked at 133 MHz, while the M4000 features a Pentium M processor clocked at 1.73 GHz.

== Specifications ==
=== W-100 ===
The W-100 series WideNotes measure 295 by 197 by 40 millimetres (11.6 by 7.8 by 1.6 in) and weigh 1.9 kilograms (4.2 lb). The color LCDs of the W-100 series WideNotes—custom designed by Sharp Corporation in Japan—measures 9.5 by 5.6 inches, giving it a roughly 16:9 widescreen aspect ratio. The laptop's display has a native resolution of 1024 by 600 pixels. Sharp offered the laptop in two variations: the more-expensive W-100T, with an active-matrix LCD, and the less-expensive W-100D, with a dual-scan LCD of lower quality. Both LCD panels have a maximum color depth of 8-bits (256 colors maximum).

The W-100 series was the first line of laptops available on the market with color widescreen LCDs, bucking from the standard SVGA (800 by 600 pixels) resolution used on all other laptops its contemporary. While somewhat shorter than the average SVGA LCD measuring 10.2 inches diagonally, the LCD of the W-100 series is over an inch wider, affording the user more real estate to the sides to, for example, multitask by having programs running side-by-side; display more cells in a spreadsheet; display 16:9 video content without letterboxing; and more. The use of widescreen displays was very uncommon even among desktop computers in the mid-1990s, making the WideNote stand apart from its competition. Driving the LCD is S3's 86CM65 graphics accelerator chip. When plugged into an external monitor, the W-100 series WideNotes can display a virtual desktop up to 1024 by 768 pixels (XGA, 4:3 aspect ratio).

The W-100 series is powered by the original Pentium processor clocked at 133 MHz. The laptops came shipped with 16 MB of EDO RAM, upgradable to 32 MB. Sharp used lithium-ion batteries for the W-100 series, with an average rated lifespan of around three hours per charge. The laptops also feature a 16-bit, Sound Blaster–compatible audio chipset and stereo speakers and a microphone built inside the case; a jack for external speakers or headphones is located at the back of the machine. Sharp included two PC Card slots, supporting two Type II cards or one Type III card, as well as an internal 22.8 kbit/s modem on the laptop's motherboard. Neither a floppy disk drive nor a CD-ROM drive are internal to the machine. Instead, Sharp sold these as external units, plugged into the side of the machines, with only the floppy drive being included with the purchase of the laptop; both could not be used at once. The laptop's 1.08 GB hard disk drive is not easily removable from the outside, requiring full disassembly of the laptop in order to replace.

For a pointing device, Sharp included a trackpad, manufactured by Alps Electric, below the full-sized keyboard. The laptops also feature infrared ports capable of transmitting data at a maximum rate of 4 Mbit/s. This allows the laptop to communicate with desktop computers that have a corresponding IR transceiver, as well as compatible printers, PDAs, and IR LANs.

=== M4000 ===
The WideNote M4000 measures 12.3 by 9 by 1.2 inches (312 by 229 by 30 mm) and weighs 3.7 pounds (1.7 kg). The M4000's color LCD measures 13.3 inches diagonally and has a resolution of 1280 by 800 pixels and an aspect ratio of 16:10. Like its predecessors, the M4000 features a built-in trackpad and stereo speakers. The M4000 upgrades the processor to a Pentium M clocked at 1.73 GHz, while the stock RAM was increased to 512 MB of DDR-400 SRAM, upgradable to 1.2 GB. The built-in Intel 915GMS graphics accelerator uses 128 MB of the system's RAM as video memory. The M4000 also includes two USB 2.0 ports, a combination CD-RW/DVD drive, and a 802.11b/g-rated Wi-Fi antenna from Intel (qualifying the laptop for Intel's Centrino marketing badge). Sharp shipped the M4000 with an 4,200-RPM, 80-GB hard disk drive manufactured by Fujitsu. The M4000 can run for up to six hours on a single charge under optimal conditions; a button on one side allows the user to easily toggle between three power conservation modes that shuts certain hardware components off and disables certain operating system services, depending on what the user is wanting to accomplish with the machine at any given point.

== Development and release ==
Sharp released the W-100T and W-100D to market in the United States in October 1996. The company supported the rollout of the laptops with a US$10-million print advertising campaign; it was the first time Sharp supported the release of any of their laptops with significant thrust. Although the widescreen LCD panels used in these machines were custom designed, they were not much more expensive to manufacture on account of Sharp having complete ownership of several LCD factories. In the summer of 1997, Sharp's largest rival Toshiba later released their own subnotebook with a near-identical widescreen LCD, the Portégé 300CT. While slightly smaller than the LCD panel used in Sharp's WideNote, the 300CT was capable of display colors at a higher bit depth of 24-bits (16.8 million colors maximum).

Sharp revived the WideNote name nearly a decade later with the M4000, released in September 2005.

== Reception ==
The W-100 series WideNotes received praise in the technology press. PC World's Laurianne McLaughlin rated the W-100T's performance high, appreciated the wider screen and found it price competitive with other subnotebooks, while finding reservation with the external drive design and mediocre battery life. She concluded: "[The W-100T and W-100D] offer plenty of computing power and screen real estate, in a thin and lightweight package. It's a great recipe for a notebook". PC Magazine's Alfred Poor found the W-100T performant compared to other notebook computers its processor class but like McLaughlin also found the battery life subpar. PC User's called the built-in speakers of the W-100 series WideNotes "rather disappointing, suffering from distortion at anything above moderate volume levels", but called the display "one of the best screens we've seen on a notebook, with crisp, bright colours". Home Office Computing concurred, with Jonathan K. Matzkin calling the W-100T's LCD outstanding: "We stared at it for hours without experiencing the eyestrain that lesser notebook screens inevitably cause".

Simson L. Garfinkel, writing in The Boston Globe, called the W-100T better than Hewlett-Packard's OmniBook 800 subnotebook: "It's got a bigger screen, better feel in its keyboard, a built-in wrist-pad, and costs substantially less", although he found the found the communications drivers flawed in their inability to handle modem, serial, and infrared communications at the same time. Giles Foden, writing in The Guardian, was more reserved in his praise, calling the display "a marvel, robust yet with good colour resolution", visible even in direct sunlight, but was mixed on the trackpad, calling it oversensitive, and criticized some of the built-in software.

The WideNote M4000 received mixed, mostly positive, reviews. Writing in CNET, Brian Nadel called the machine limited by its 1.5 GB RAM ceiling and lack of built-in gigabit Ethernet but praised the brightness and fidelity of the screen, battery life, and range of its Wi-Fi antenna. Carla Thornton of PC World criticized the keyboard and trackpad, calling the latter "wiggly and cheap, with a slightly rattly keystroke" and the latter "uncomfortably small". Like Nadel, she praised the battery life and called the machine overall "easy to tote" and "peppy enough" for most applications, albeit "no speed demon". PC Magazine also praised the long battery life and screen but called the choice of drives a limiting factor in its versatility and criticized the lack of a FireWire port. Digital Trends's Aaron Colter compared the laptop's aesthetic to Apple's PowerBook G4 and concluded in a mixed assessment that, "[o]verall, the M4000 WideNote should be a good example of how a company can take a highly standardized design and still make it stick out in a crowd, but the lack of customization and basic features sends this notebook to the bottom of the class".
