= Sharp Actius =

Actius is a brand used by Sharp Corporation for some of their laptops. It may refer to:

- Sharp Actius MM10 Muramasas
- Sharp Actius RD3D
