= Toshiba T1200 =

Portable computer

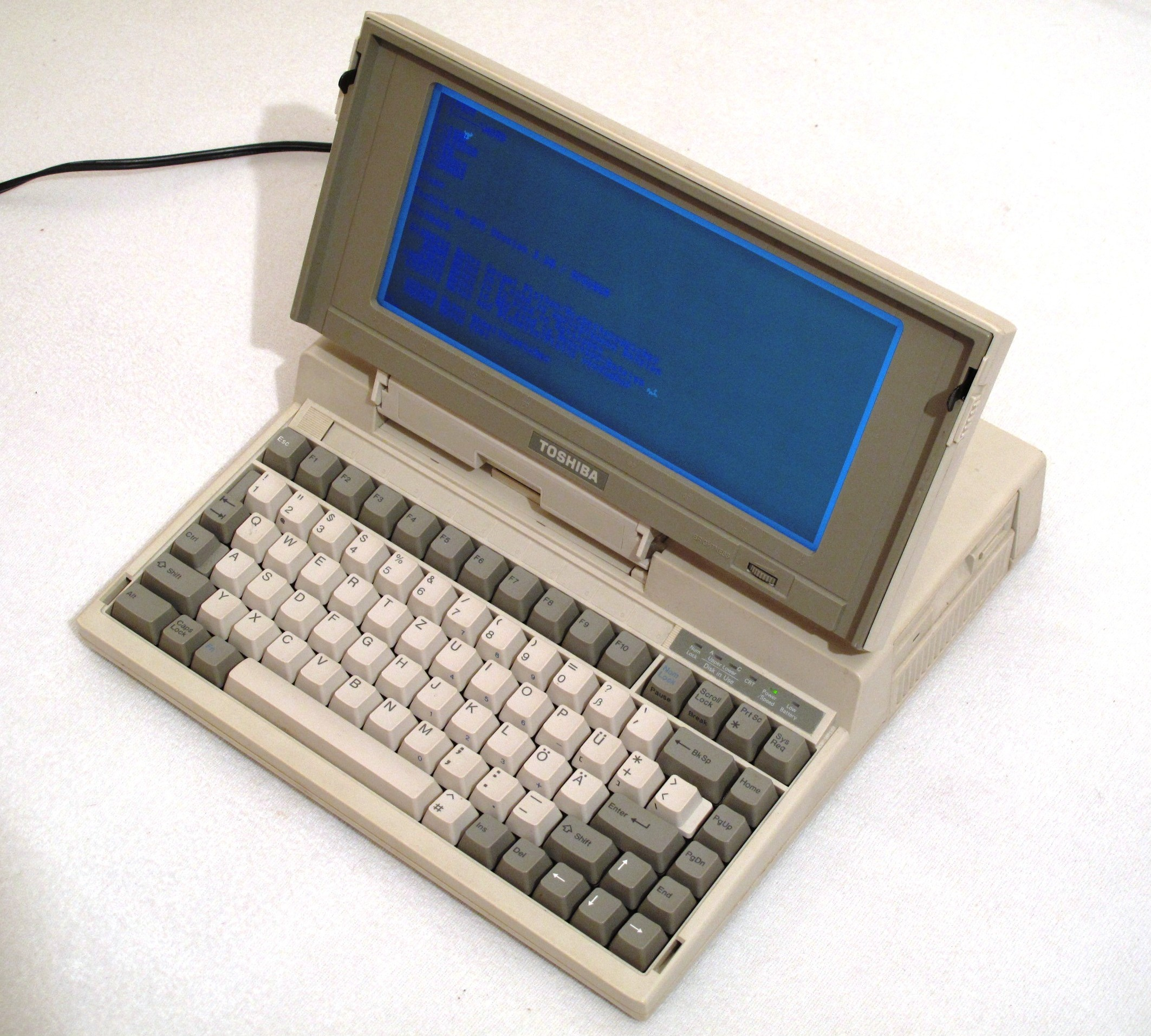
- Toshiba T1200
- Manufacturer: Toshiba Corporation
- Product family: Toshiba T series
- Type: Laptop
- Released: 1987; 39 years ago
- Introductory price: US$6,499 (equivalent to $18,000 in 2024)
- Operating system: MS-DOS 3.3
- CPU: Intel 80C86, 4.77 or 9.54 MHz switchable
- Memory: 1 MB RAM
- Storage: 20 MB hard drive; internal 3.5" floppy drive, 720 KB; external 5.25" floppy drive, 360 KB
- Display: Textmode: 80×25
- Graphics: 640×200 (CGA)
- Input: Keyboard 83 keys, QWERTY
- Weight: 4.1 kg (9.0 lb)
- Predecessor: Toshiba T1100 Plus

The Toshiba T1200 is a discontinued laptop that was manufactured by the Toshiba Corporation, first made in 1987. It is an upgraded version of the Toshiba T1100 Plus.

It is equipped with an Intel 80C86 processor at 9.54 MHz, 1 MB RAM of which 384 KB can be used for LIM EMS or as a RAMdisk, CGA graphics card, one 720 KB 3.5" floppy drive and one 20 MB hard drive (Some models had two floppy drives and no hard drive controller card.) MS-DOS 3.30 is included with the laptop. It is the first laptop with a swappable battery pack. Its original price was US$6,499 (equivalent to $18,000 in 2024).

The T1200's hard drive has an unusual 26-pin interface made by JVC, incompatible with ST506/412 or ATA interfaces. Floppy drives are connected using similar 26-pin connectors. The computer has many unique functions, such as Hard RAM - a small part of RAM is battery-backed and can be used as a non-volatile hard drive. Another function allows to suspend the system or power control the hard drive (which is still dependent on the hard disk's on/off switch).

The Toshiba T1200xe is an upgraded model of this laptop, which contained a 12 MHz 80C286 processor and a 20 or 40 MB hard disk drive. It also has 1 MB of RAM expandable to 5 MB. The floppy drive was also upgraded from 720 KB to 1.44 MB.

== See also ==
- Toshiba T1100
- Toshiba T1000
- Toshiba T3100
- Toshiba T1000LE
