= Toshiba T1000 =

Laptop computer made in 1987

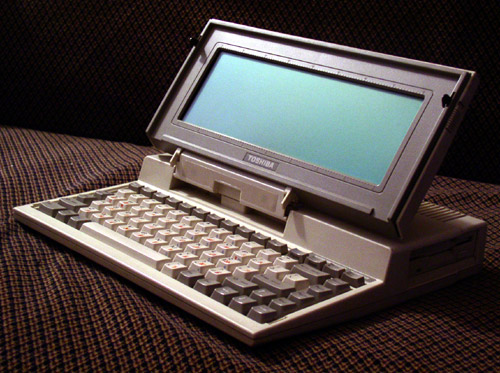
- Toshiba T1000
- Developer: Toshiba; Tetsuya Mizoguchi; Ginzo Yamazaki
- Manufacturer: Toshiba
- Product family: Toshiba T series
- Type: Laptop
- Released: 1987; 39 years ago
- Introductory price: US$1,199 (equivalent to $3,400 in 2025)
- Operating system: MS-DOS 2.11
- CPU: 80C88 @ 4.77 MHz
- Memory: 512 KB RAM (expandable to 1.2 MB with optional 768 KB LIM-EMS 3.2/HardRAM card); 256 KB ROM (MS-DOS 2.11)
- Storage: Internal 3.5" floppy drive, 720 KB
- Graphics: CGA card (16 KB RAM)
- Sound: PC speaker
- Power: 9 VDC, 1.1A (+ = core; - = barrel)
- Dimensions: 310 × 280 × 52 mm
- Weight: 2.9 kg (6.4 lb)
- Predecessor: Toshiba T1100

The Toshiba T1000 is a discontinued laptop manufactured by the Toshiba Corporation in 1987. It has a similar specification to the IBM PC Convertible, with a 4.77 MHz 80C88 processor, 512 KB of RAM, and a monochrome CGA-compatible LCD. Unlike the Convertible, it includes a standard serial port and parallel port, connectors for an external monitor, and a real-time clock.

Unusual for an IBM compatible PC, the T1000 contains a 256 KB ROM with a copy of MS-DOS 2.11. This acts as a small, read-only hard drive. Alternative operating systems can still be loaded from the floppy drive, or (if present) the RAM disk.

Along with the T1200 and earlier T1100, the Toshiba T1000 is one of the early computers to feature a "laptop" form factor and battery-powered operation.

== Reception ==
PC Magazine in 1988 named the Toshiba T1000 an "Editor's Choice" among 12 tested portable computers. One reviewer called it "the first real DOS laptop" and a plausible replacement for his Tandy 200, while another praised its durability after 60,000 miles of traveling and "incredible bargain" $800 street price. BYTE in 1989 listed the T1000 as among the "Excellence" winners of the BYTE Awards, stating that it "takes portability to the limit ... as self-contained as you can get and still have a real computer that can handle real-world workloads." Noting that it was available for as little as $850, the magazine reported that "Many of us are in love with this one." In the same issue, Jerry Pournelle praised it as a "little gem". While acknowledging that it cost more than the TRS-80 Model 100 and NEC PC-8201, he believed that "you get quite a lot for the added weight and price", and reported that "Many writers swear by the T1000. David Drake loves his."

== Specification ==
Battery	Rechargeable NiCd pack (1300 mAh)
Mouse	None
Keyboard	Selectable between PC or AT (101)

== Software compatibility ==
Compatible with software written for the IBM PC/XT using a color graphics adapter (CGA) display

== Interfaces ==
- RGB (CGA) color video port
- Composite B&W monochrome video port
- RS-232-C serial port
- Parallel printer port
- Numeric keypad port
- External diskette drive port
- Toshiba proprietary memory slot
- Toshiba proprietary modem slot - "B" form factor

== See also ==
- Toshiba T1000LE
- Toshiba T1100
- Toshiba T1200
- Toshiba T3100

== Notes ==
The laptop's battery pack must be charged and working for the laptop to power on.
