= Toshiba T3100 =

Laptop computer

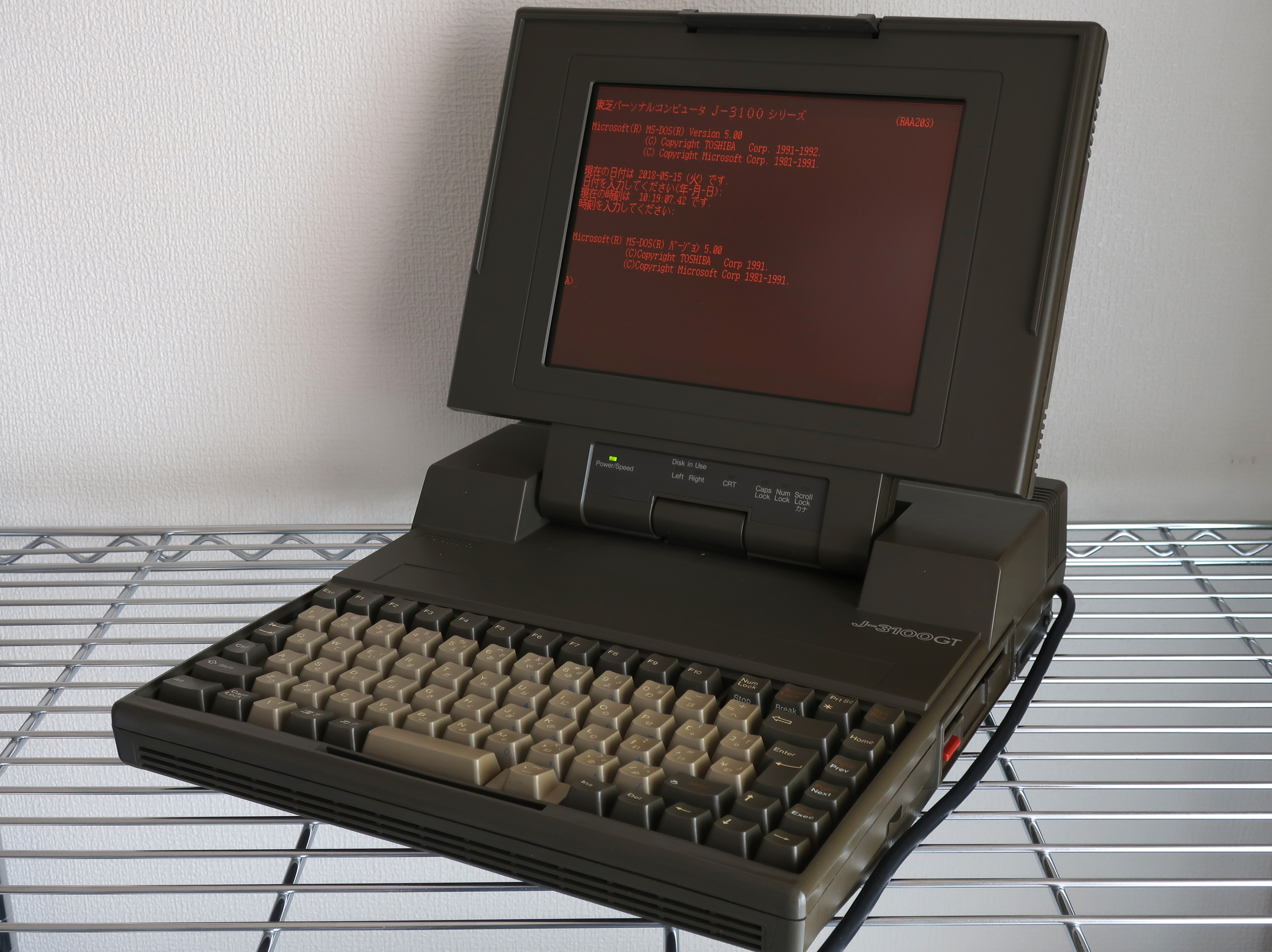
- Developer: Toshiba; Tetsuya Mizoguchi; Haruhiko Banno; Yasuo Suzuki
- Manufacturer: Toshiba
- Product family: Toshiba T series
- Type: Laptop
- Released: 1986; 40 years ago
- Operating system: MS-DOS 3.2
- CPU: Intel 80286 @ 8 MHz
- Memory: 640 KB RAM (upgradable to 2.6 MB)
- Storage: 10 MB hard drive; internal 3.5" floppy drive, 720 KB; connector for external 5.25" floppy drive, 360 KB
- Display: monochrome 9.5" orange gas-plasma display
- Graphics: 640×400; 640×200; Textmode: 80×25; T3100SX: 640x480 VGA
- Input: keyboard - 83 keys, QWERTY
- Connectivity: external monitor via 9-pin RGB port
- Dimensions: 31.0 x 36.1 x 7.9 cm
- Weight: 7.5 kg (17 lb)

The Toshiba T3100 is a discontinued portable PC manufactured by Toshiba released in 1986. It features a 10 MB hard drive, 8 MHz Intel 80286 CPU and a black & orange 9.5" gas-plasma display with a resolution of 640 × 400 pixels.

The portable has a special high-resolution 640 × 400 display mode which is similar to and partially compatible with the Olivetti/AT&T 6300 graphics. The base model has 640 KB memory. There is a single proprietary expansion slot for 1200 bit/s modem, expansion chassis for 5x 8-bit ISA cards, Ethernet NIC, 2400 bit/s modem, and a 2 MB memory card (thus 2.6 MB in max total). T3100e model has 1 MB of memory, which can be upgraded to 5 MB.

Toshiba T3100 is not a true portable, because it needs an external power source in all except the last version.

Five additional versions exist:

- The T3100/20 is essentially the same as the base T3100 but with a larger hard drive (20 MB instead of 10 MB).
- The T3100e has a 12 MHz 80286 CPU (switchable to 6 MHz), 1 MB RAM and a 20 MB hard drive.
- The T3100e/40 is the same as the T3100e, but with a larger 40 MB hard drive.
- The T3100SX has a 16 MHz i386SX CPU, 1 MB RAM and a 40 MB or 80 MB hard drive, a VGA 640 × 480 × 16 shade black & orange gas plasma display or black & white LCD, and also included an internal rechargeable battery, for true portability.
- The J3100 is a version of the T3100 that was marketed and sold in Japan only, and included hardware Japanese font support.

== Reception ==
BYTE in 1989 listed the T3100/20 as among the "Distinction" winners of the BYTE Awards, citing its "amazingly clear" display and hard drive.

== Software ==
There are 23 games on this list.

Title	Japanese title	Product code	Publisher	Year
Balance of Power			ASCII	1989
Best Play Pro Yakyu	ベストプレープロ野球		ASCII	
Caveman Ugh-Lympics		JD302G	Acclaim Japan	
Columns: Taisen Mode-tsuki	コラムス 対戦モード付	JAN 4988697890011	SystemSoft	1991
Igo II	囲碁Ⅱ	JAN 4988606204854	ASCII	1990
Kitahei	棋太平	GS-072	SPS	
Laptop Chess			Corridor	
Lemmings	レミングス		Imagineer	1991
Minigolf			Jelly Beans	
Nobunaga's Ambition: Sengoku Gunyuuden	信長の野望・戦国群雄伝		Koei	1990
Pinball Wizard			Jelly Beans	
SimCity	シムシティ		Imagineer	1990
SimEarth	シムアース		Imagineer	1991
Sokoban Perfect	倉庫番パーフェクト		Thinking Rabbit	1989
Sokoban Revenge: User no Gyakushuu-hen	倉庫番リベンジ ユーザー逆襲編		Thinking Rabbit	1991
Solitaire Royale			Corridor	
Super Daisenryaku	Super大戦略		SystemSoft	
Super Shanghai: Dragon's Eye	スーパー上海 ドラゴンズアイ		HOT-B	1991
Tenka Toitsu	天下統一	JAN 4988697870013	SystemSoft	1990
Tetris	テトリス		Acclaim Japan	1988
Wizardry VI: Bane of the Cosmic Forge	ウィザードリィ BCF		ASCII	
Zan: Kagero no Toki	斬 陽炎の時代 ダイナブック版	JAN 4988160940090	Wolf Team	1989
Zan: Scenario Collection Vol. 2 (expansion)	斬シナリオコレクション VOL.2	JAN 4988160940151	Wolf Team	1990

== See also ==
- Toshiba T1200
- Toshiba T1100
- Toshiba T1000
