= DSTN =

DSTN (double super twisted nematic), also known as dual-scan super twisted nematic or simply dual-scan, is an LCD technology in which a screen is divided in half, which are simultaneously refreshed giving faster refresh rate than traditional passive matrix screens. It is an improved form of supertwist nematic display that offers low power consumption but inferior sharpness and brightness compared to TFT screens.

== History ==
For several years (early 1990s to early 2000s), TFT screens were only found in high-end laptops due to them being more expensive and lower-end laptops offering DSTN screens only. This was at a time when the screen was often the most expensive component of laptops. The price difference between a laptop with DSTN and one with TFT could easily be $400 or more. However, TFT gradually became cheaper and essentially captured the entire market, before being replaced with IPS (itself in the process of being replaced with OLED, starting with high-end).

DSTN display quality is poor compared to TFT, with visible noise, smearing, much lower contrast and slow response. Such screens are unsuitable for viewing movies or playing video games of any kind.
