= Active-matrix liquid-crystal display =

Type of flat-panel display

An active-matrix liquid-crystal display (AMLCD) is a common type of liquid-crystal display (LCD). Having supplanted passive-matrix LCDs in general use, in common vernacular, an active-matrix LCD is also simply referred to as a LCD. As of 2025, the term "AMLCD" is uncommon as a matter of technical jargon; instead, due to their ubiquity, different types of active-matrix liquid crystal displays are usually specified — TN, IPS, VA for LCD panels, and LED or Mini LED for backlights, for example.

Various types of AMLCDs are used as flat-panel displays in many different applications, including televisions, computer monitors, in-vehicle infotainment systems, notebook computers, tablet computers and smartphones. AMLCDs are a relatively mature technology, and desirable in the above applications due in part to their low weight, flexibility, thinness, luminous efficacy, pixel density, image quality, range of possible color gamuts, and quick response times.

In comparison to other contemporaneous display technologies, most AMLCD technologies struggle with contrast. Because an AMLCD requires a backlight, one typically cannot display true black — instead, dark gray is shown.

Among other reasons, due to their smaller size, lower power consumption, lower toxicity, and higher overall brightness, AMLCDs produced since the late 2000s use LED backlights instead of CCFLs.

The utilization of LED backlighting enables some AMLCDs (mostly televisions) to employ methods like localized dimming to increase their perceived contrast ratio. When the display's controller detects darkness in the frame or GOP being displayed, groups of LEDs comprising the display's backlight are dimmed at the corresponding physical location (the number of localized dimming zones the display provides is typically in the hundreds but varies heavily, typically increasing proportionally to the display's MSRP). Unfortunately, it is not uncommon for localized dimming to cause portions of the image (for example, subtitles during a dark scene) to be incorrectly and undesirably dimmed to a level where the image is not clearly visible. Displays where localized dimming cannot be disabled are therefore unsuitable for applications like non-linear editing or color grading, where color accuracy and correct gamma are required.

The issue is very well-known, having plagued AMLCDs for decades. Amongst other technologies, it contributed to the development of MicroLED displays, a type of AMLCD. A MicroLED display uses one LED per pixel as its backlight, so a MicroLED display is capable of displaying black by simply turning the relevant LED off — rendering the corresponding pixel completely dark. However, as of February 2025, MicroLED displays have not been widely adopted and are considerably more expensive than other AMLCD displays.

The concept of active-matrix LCDs was proposed by Bernard J. Lechner at the RCA Laboratories in 1968. The first functional AMLCD with thin-film transistors was made by T. Peter Brody, Fang-Chen Luo and their team at Westinghouse Electric Corporation in 1972. However, it took years of additional research and development by others to launch successful products.

== Etymology ==
The term "active matrix" was coined by T. Peter Brody in 1975.

== Introduction ==
The most common type of AMLCD contains, besides the polarizing sheets and cells of liquid crystal, a matrix of thin-film transistors to make a thin-film-transistor liquid-crystal display. These devices store the electrical state of each pixel on the display while all the other pixels are being updated. This method provides a much brighter, sharper display than a passive matrix of the same size. An important specification for these displays is their viewing angle.

Thin-film transistors are usually used for constructing an active matrix so that the two terms are often interchanged, even though a thin-film transistor is just one component in an active matrix and some active-matrix designs have used other components such as diodes. Whereas a passive matrix display uses a simple conductive grid to apply a voltage to the liquid crystals in the target area, an active-matrix display uses a grid of transistors and capacitors with the ability to hold a charge for a limited period of time. Because of the switching action of transistors, only the desired pixel receives a charge, and the pixel acts as a capacitor to hold the charge until the next refresh cycle, improving image quality over a passive matrix. This is a special version of a sample-and-hold circuit.

== See also ==
- Display resolution
