= Sharp Actius MM10 =

The Sharp Actius MM10 Muramasas was a laptop computer (subnotebook) developed by Sharp Corporation which started selling in 2003.

It was named after a sword master, Muramasa Tenji, and is one of the thinnest computers in the world at 20 mm thick at its maximum. It had a battery life of 2.5 hours, a 1 GHz Transmeta Crusoe processor, 256 MB of memory, a Wi-Fi module (incorporated into the laptop), a 15 GB hard drive and a $1,499 price tag.
