= Toshiba T1100 =

1985 laptop computer

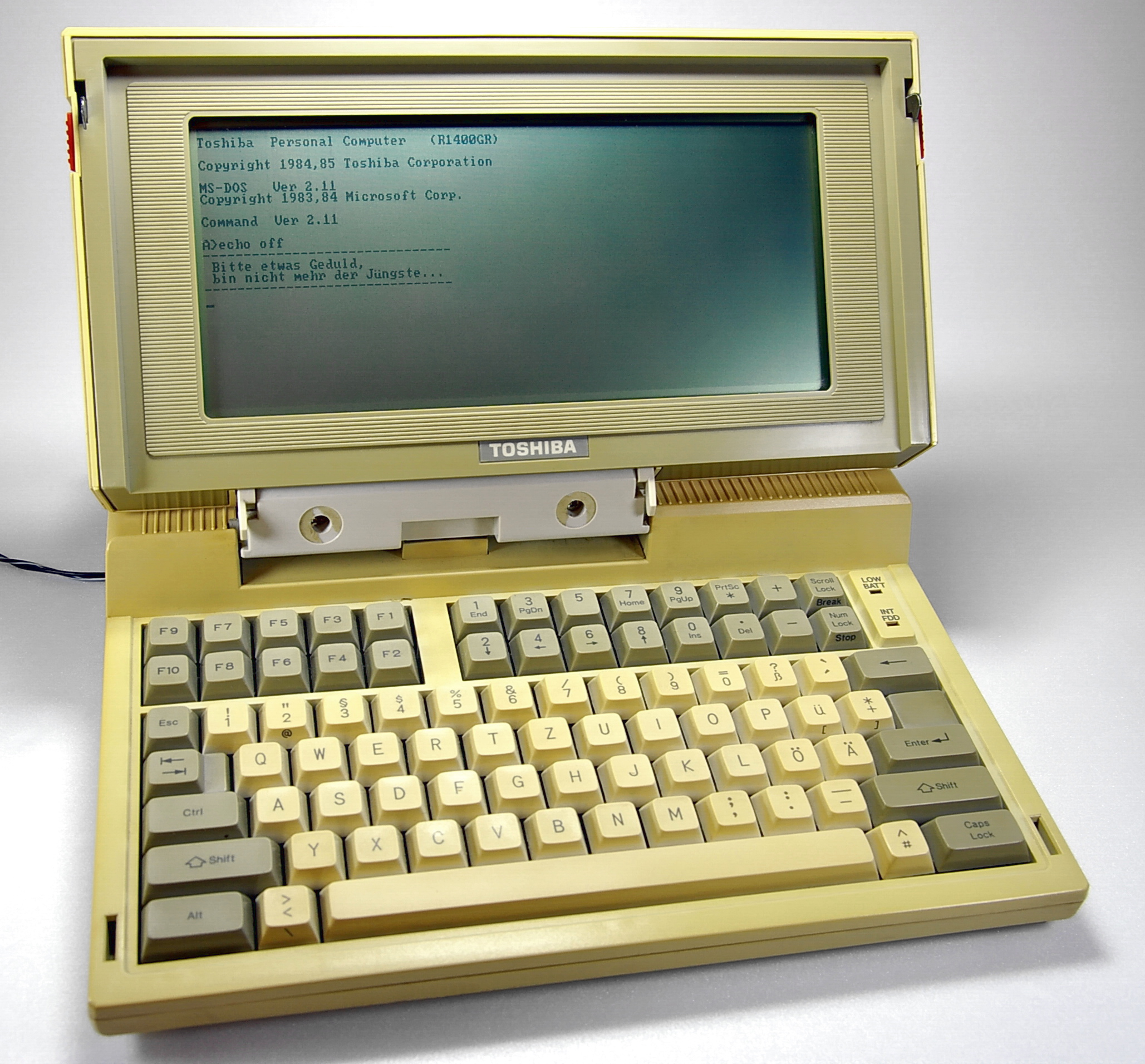
- Toshiba T1100, discolored
- Manufacturer: Toshiba
- Released: 1985; 41 years ago
- Introductory price: US$1,899 (equivalent to $5,680 in 2025)
- Operating system: MS-DOS 2.11
- CPU: Intel 80C88 @ 4.77 MHz
- Memory: 256 KB RAM (upgradable to 512 KB)
- Storage: Internal 3.5" floppy drive, 720 KB; external 5.25" floppy drive, 360 KB
- Display: Monochrome LCD / Text mode: 80×25
- Graphics: 640×200 (CGA)
- Input: Keyboard 83 keys, QWERTY
- Weight: 4.1 kg (9.0 lb)
- Successor: Toshiba T1200

The Toshiba T1100 is a laptop manufactured by Toshiba in 1985, and has subsequently been described by Toshiba as "the world's first mass-market laptop computer". Its technical specifications were comparable to the original IBM PC desktop, using floppy disks (it had no hard drive), a 4.77 MHz Intel 80C88 CPU (a lower-power variation of the Intel 8088), 256 KB of conventional RAM extendable to 512 KB, and a monochrome LCD capable of displaying 80x25 text and 640x200 CGA graphics. Its original price was US$1,899 (equivalent to $5,680 in 2025).

The T1100 PLUS is a later model of this laptop, released to the market in 1986. Some significant differences to the T1100 are: 16-bit data bus 80C86 CPU, 7.16 MHz or 4.77 MHz operation, 256 KB of conventional RAM (16-bit) extendable to 640 KB, and two internal 720 KB 3.5" diskette drives.

The T1100 was named an IEEE Milestone in 2009.

== Clones ==
Toshiba T1100 PLUS was cloned in the USSR as Electronika MS 1504 in 1991.

== See also ==
- Toshiba T1000
- Toshiba T1200
- Toshiba T3100
