= Toshiba Satellite Pro 400 series =

Line of professional notebook computers marketed by Toshiba

Satellite Pro 400 series

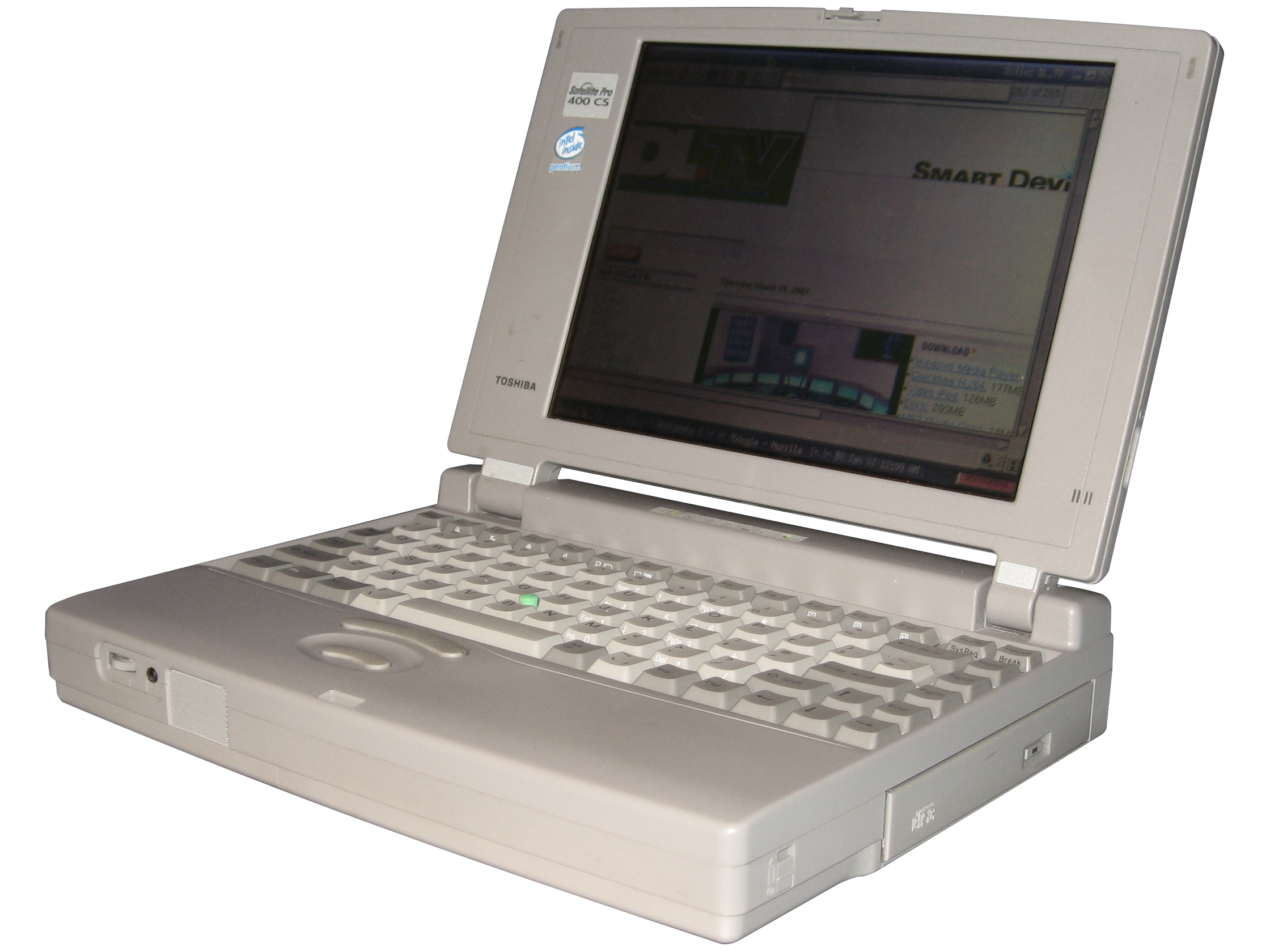
- Satellite Pro 400CS, one of the first models in the line, from 1995
- Developer: Toshiba Information Systems
- Manufacturer: Toshiba
- Product family: Satellite Pro
- Type: Laptop (notebook)
- Released: June 19, 1995; 31 years ago
- Availability: July 1995
- Lifespan: 1995–1999
- Operating system: MS-DOS; Microsoft Windows
- CPU: Pentium; Pentium II-M
- Predecessor: Satellite Pro T2150CDT
- Successor: Tecra 8000

The Satellite Pro 400 series was a series of notebook-sized laptops under the Satellite Pro line manufactured by Toshiba Information Systems from 1995 to 1999. Almost all entries in the line feature Pentium processors from Intel, with the final models featuring the Mobile Pentium II. Toshiba oriented the Satellite Pro 400 series at professionals who wanted multimedia features in a compact package; accordingly, all models feature a slot for a CD-ROM drive, built-in audio, and accelerated graphics. The Satellite Pro was a major market success for Toshiba and helped the company become the number-one global laptop manufacturer for much of the mid-1990s, beating out major competitors such as IBM and Compaq. Most models in the series received positive reception from technology journalists.

== Development and specifications ==
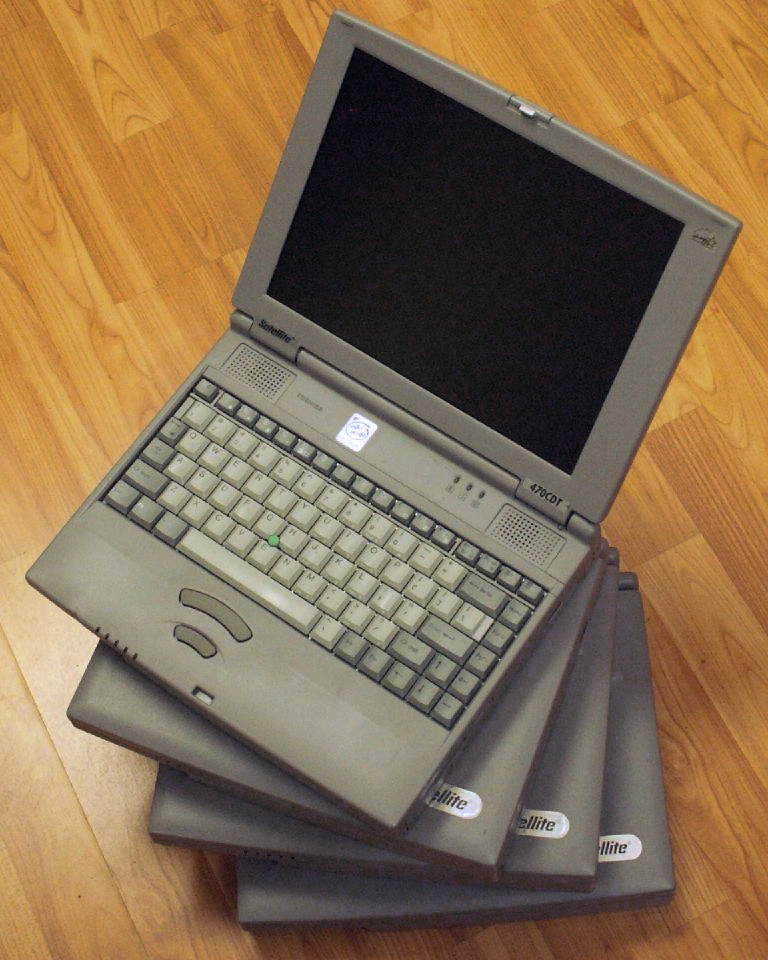
A stack of Satellite Pro 470CDTs

Toshiba Information Systems introduced the Satellite Pro 400 series on June 19, 1995, starting with the 400CDT and 400CS models. This was a month after they had announced the Portégé 610CT, the first subnotebook with a Pentium processor, and almost a full year after they had announced the T4900CT, the first notebook-sized laptop with a Pentium processor. Toshiba oriented the Satellite Pro between their consumer Satellite notebooks and their higher-end Portégé subnotebooks; the Satellite Pro 400 series was specifically marketed as multimedia-oriented systems. Development for the Satellite Pro 400 as a whole was led by Karen Reader, senior product manager of the Satellite series at Toshiba America Information Systems in Irvine, California. The design for initial models of the Satellite Pro 400 series was based on Toshiba's earlier Satellite Pro T2150CDT, which featured an Intel DX4 clocked at 75 MHz. The 400CDT and 400CS upgrades the processor to a Pentium clocked at 75 MHz. The final entries in the line, the 490CDT and the 490XCDT, featured Mobile Pentium II processors clocked at 233 MHz and 266 MHz, respectively.

Every entry in the Satellite Pro 400 series feature a rechargeable lithium-ion battery (upgrading from the NiMH batteries of its predecessors), a keyboard-integrated pointing stick (trademarked AccuPoint), and a hot-swappable expansion bay on the right side of the machine that allows users to slot in a floppy drive, a CD-ROM drive, or a blank to save on weight. Starting with the 440CDT, a secondary hard disk drive or a secondary rechargeable battery could also be installed in the bay. At the time of its release in November 1996, the 430CDT had the fastest CD-ROM drive on the market, at 10× speed.

The Satellite Pro 400 series made near-exclusive use of Chips and Technologies's (C&T) range of graphics accelerators, starting with the 65546 chip in the 400CDT, followed by the 65548 in the 410CDT, both of which only have 1 MB of DRAM-based video RAM. The VRAM was boosted to 2 MB starting with the 420CDT, which features a C&T 65550 "HiQVideo" graphics accelerator. Toshiba equipped the 440CDT with C&T's F65554 "HiQVideo" graphics accelerator, which allowed for hardware-accelerated MPEG-1 video playback. The 480CDT was the last model in the line to feature a C&T graphics accelerator, sporting a F65555 with EDO DRAM–based video RAM. The 490CDT and 490XCDT—the final entries in the Satellite Pro 400 series—make use of S3's ViRGE 2MX 3D chipset, allowing for hardware-accelerated 3D graphics.

Initial entries in the Satellite Pro 400 series—from the 400CDT to the 430CDT—featured integrated AC adapters, taking the standard "figure-8" connector for AC power, in lieu of barrel connectors for DC input. This eliminated the need to carry an external power brick, at the expensive of adding heft to the main unit. Starting with the 440CDT, Toshiba off-loaded the power supply into the traditional external power brick. Additionally, models before the 440CDT were designed with a single speaker, positioned at the front of the machines, for playing audio without headphones, but only in mono—a source of frequent criticism. The 440CDT redesigned the case to add an additional speaker, both housed above the keyboard, for stereo audio playback. Its keyboard was additionally redesigned to add a Windows key and a menu key.

The Satellite Pro 440CDX, released in June 1997, was the first laptop on the market with a passive-matrix LCD utilizing high-performance addressing (HPA) technology. HPA was a technology developed by Sharp Corporation in order to decrease the long response times endemic to DSTN LCDs. Through a special technique known as multiline addressing, Sharp were able to reduce the response times, and therefore ghosting artifacts, to 150 milliseconds—half that of DSTN displays (but still more than the 70 millisecond response times of contemporary TFT LCDs). Toshiba licensed Sharp's HPA patents in March 1997, rebranding it as FastScan. It was used again in the 460CDX, released in November 1997.

== Sales ==
The Satellite Pro 400 series was an immediate hot-seller for Toshiba and helped the company overtake IBM as the global market leader for notebook computers in the mid-1990s. Toshiba cornered the market on notebooks with roughly 22 percent global market share in September 1995, ahead of IBM's 16 percent and AST Research's 7 percent. Throughout 1996, Toshiba had maintained their lead and was the only Japanese company to corner a major American PC market, according to The Wall Street Journal. Toshiba's American notebook market share peaked in March 1997 at 37 percent, according to Computer Reseller News, while their global market share in the same period was 25 percent, more than IBM and Compaq's shares combined. The Satellite Pro 430CDT in particular sold very well for Toshiba, that model being the second best-selling laptop for the month of July 1997, behind Toshiba's lower-end Satellite 225CDS.

Toshiba were knocked off the number one slot for global notebook market share in November 1997 by Compaq, however, and by 1998 their market share had dropped to 20 percent. Cited as reasons for Toshiba's slide was market oversaturation leading to massive markdowns, as well as a botched launch into the desktop computer market. According to Dataquest and Computer Intelligence, Toshiba sold 1.2 million laptops in 1996 and an identical figure in 1997.

Between August 7 and August 23, 1997, certain submodels of the Satellite Pro 400 series, including the 430CDS, the 430CDT, the 440CDX, the 440CDT, and the 460CDT, were infected with the AntiEXE boot sector virus at Toshiba's plant during final end-user testing at their facility in Orange, California. The virus only affected users who opted to install Windows for Workgroups 3.11 on their notebooks, as its successor Windows 95 eradicates the virus during the installation process. Toshiba representatives said that less than one percent of notebooks produced during this time were affected.

== Reception ==
Reviewing the inaugural 400CDT, both PC World and PC Magazine found the laptop very performant, with PC Magazine's Melissa J. Perenson writing that the laptop "rival[ed] the power of many desktop systems". Perenson benchmarked the 400CDT for its performance in Windows and found that it scored above certain 90-MHz Pentium machines, despite the 400CDT's Pentium only being clocked at 75 MHz. Perenson praised the enlargement of the palm rest area over its predecessors and called its case "industrial-strength". Bruce Brown of the same publication called the 400CDT's battery life "terrific" and found the laptop performant in Windows but noted frames dropping while watching Video CDs in full screen. PC User's Clare Newsome praised the 400CDT for the ergonomics of its keyboard, the quality of its mono speaker, and the richness of its LCD but criticized the external floppy drive for being overly bulky. The Sydney Morning Herald's Sue Lowe deemed the LCD superior to offerings by Digital (HiNote) and Texas Instruments (TravelMate). On the other hand, Newmedia's Marty Jerome found the LCD a weak point of the 400CDT on account of its VGA resolution. PC Laptop Magazine's Cassandra Cavanah concurred. Windows Magazine's Jim Forbes rated the 400CDT's processing speed and multimedia capability on par with desktop computers of its processor class while finding disk performance above average. He deemed the keyboard and pointing stick comfortable to use and the display comfortably large but found the battery performance lacking on account of the laptop's cooling fan constantly running.

Reviewing the 410CDT, Byte ranked it the best laptop out of 13 competing models, beating out IBM's ThinkPad 760CD on account of the 410CDT's superior performance, battery life, and LCD quality. Home Office Computing's Rick Broida called the 410CDT "an excellent choice for multimedia presentations and a capable desktop surrogate", albeit with a hard drive he deemed undersized compared to its competitors. Computer Reseller News's Joel Shore tied the 410CDT in first place along with Texas Instruments' Extensa 550CDT as the best of 13 competitors in the notebook market. Comparing the 410CDT to NEC's Versa 4050C, PC/Computing's Marty Jermone found the 410CDT superior in CD-ROM performance and LCD quality but complained about the 410CDT's single speaker being tinny and overall found the 4050C more expandable. PC World also found the 410CDT's single speaker tinny and prone to distortion and found the processor slower than other contemporary laptops that where cheaper than the 410CDT but was impressed by the wide viewing angle of the 410CDT's LCD. Brown found the battery life of the 410CDT inferior to its predecessor the 400CDT by nearly 30 minutes.

Reviewing the 420CDS, PC World's Brad Grimes called it the fastest 100-MHz Pentium laptop the magazine had reviewed to date, despite the lack of L2 cache, and called the passive-matrix LCD "crisp and bright", albeit with limited viewing angles. He also praised the long battery life (over four hours on a single charge) and called the keyboard "large and comfortable". PC Magazine's Robert S. Anthony rated the battery life of the 420CDT an improvement over the 410CDT and found the CD-ROM speedy. Jerome graded the 420CDT the top-performing laptop out of 21 reviewed, calling it a "workhorse". Forbes meanwhile found the 420CDT's performance only average; he also found the LCD dimmer than other laptops of its contemporary. Reviewing the 430CDS, PC Magazine awarded it Editor's Choice, Anthony writing: "One look at the [spec] sheet and you'd think you were buying a desktop PC". PC World praised the 430CDS's battery life and rated the performance more than adequate but found the passive-matrix LCD subpar and the unit itself overweight compared to its competitors. Home Office Computing's Rick Broida found the 430CDT's design somewhat outdated and bemoaned the mono speaker but praised the LCD and called the keyboard "one of the industry's most comfortable".

Reviewing the 440CDX, Broida found the laptop's battery life adequate at around two hours, rated the redesigned stereo sound system highly, and enjoyed the redesigned keyboard, but disliked the Windows and Menu keys being "crammed" into the top right corner and bemoaned the lack of an internal modem. He was impressed by the effect of the high-performance addressing display, noting that it "drastically reduced ghosting, though it did not eliminate the effect", and had good color. John Hilvert of the Australian PC World was less impressed by the HPA LCD, calling it "a little blotchy and hard to adjust to get a great view". The American PC World deemed the performance average for a laptop in its processor class and called the redesigned keyboard pleasant to use but found the battery life subpar and like Broida criticized the lack of an internal modem.

Reviewing the 460CDT, Computer Dealer News called the laptop's processing power middle-of-the-road but gave it high marks for its usability and feature set. Reviewing the 480CDT, Byte called the laptop's design bland but called it a "safe, competent choice". Reviewing the 490CDT, Joel Scambray of InfoWorld found the laptop overweight and its case overly thick, writing that "it's hard to ignore the leaner profiles and larger displays of the other entrants". Scambray praised the performance of the pointing stick and found the laptop scored well in performance benchmarks. PC World deemed the 490CDT's battery life inadequate and found it a worse value proposition than Gateway's Solo 2500SE. The magazine however rated the laptop among the fastest in its processor class and called the LCD "beautifully crisp" and the keyboard responsive and firm. Reviewing the 490XCDT, Carol Venezia called the laptop "a strong performer across the board" with fast a boot-up time. PC/Computing wrote that the 490XCDT had the best keyboard of 22 laptops reviewed but among the worst battery life of the same sample set. Keith Kirkpatrick of Home Office Computing called the 490XCDT more well-designed and versatile than Dell's Inspiron 3200, albeit with weaker graphical performance.

== Legacy ==
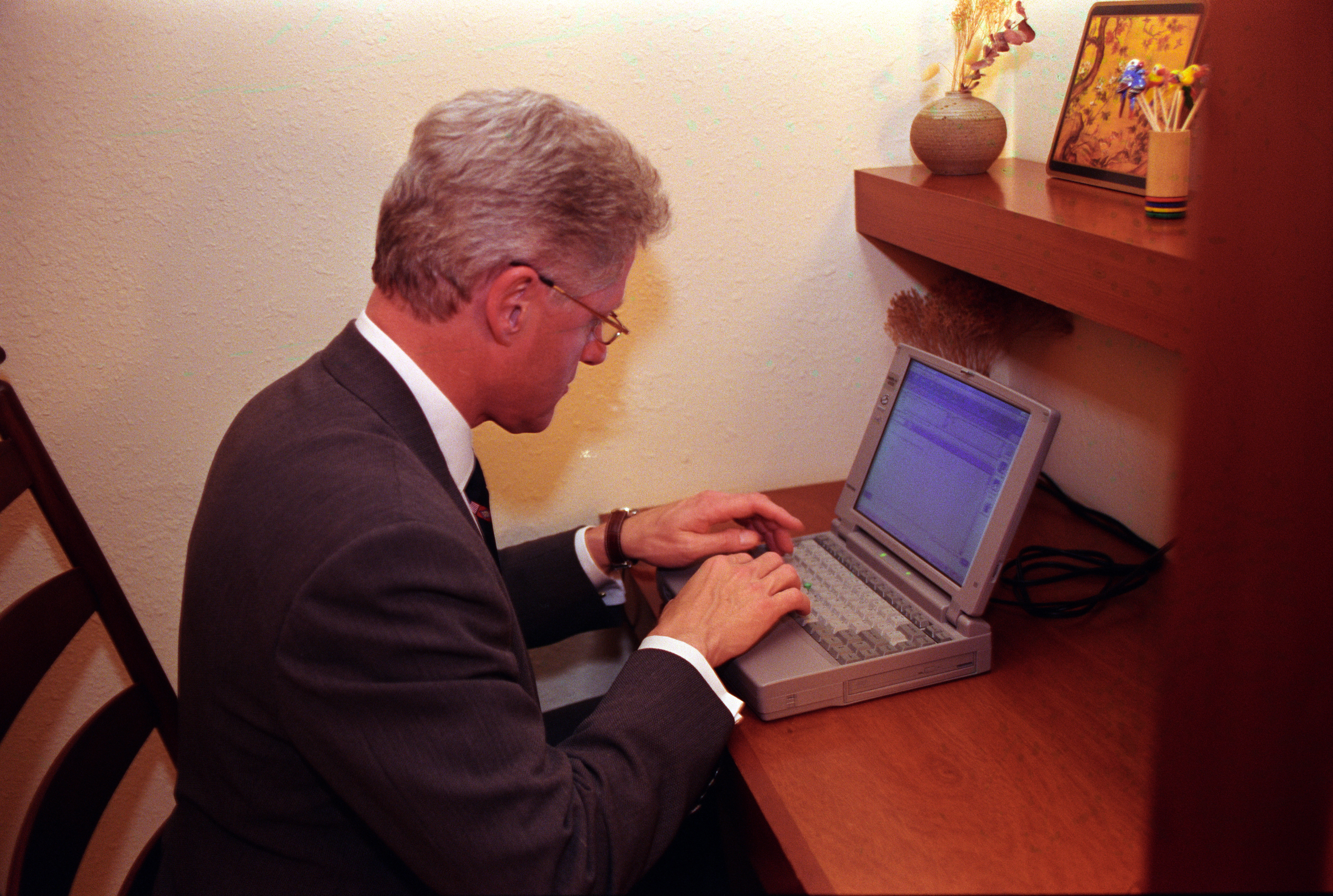
President Bill Clinton using a Satellite Pro 435CDS to send the first presidential email on November 6, 1998

The Satellite Pro 400 series was directly replaced by the Tecra 8000 in August 1998, which featured the Mobile Pentium II clocked between 233 MHz and 300 MHz. Toshiba merged three separate product lines—the Satellite Pro 400 series, the Tecra 500 series, and the Tecra 700 series—in an attempt to streamline their laptop roster.

On November 6, 1998, a Satellite Pro 435CDS loaned to U.S. President Bill Clinton by Robert G. Darling, a White House physician and a Navy Medical Corps commander, was used by Clinton to respond to an email by the astronaut John Glenn, who was on board the Space Shuttle Discovery at the time. This marked the first email ever sent by a sitting U.S. president in the course of their duties. The laptop was given back to Darling in 2000, who preserved it, the installed software, and the original copies of the emails sent by Clinton. In April 2014, Darling put his 435CDS up for sale through RR Auction. It sold for over US$60,000 on April 16.

== Models ==
Toshiba Satellite Pro 400 series models
Model	Release date	Processor	Clock speed (MHz)	LCD technology	LCD size (in.)	LCD resolution	Stock RAM (max., in MB)	HDD	Graphics chip	VRAM (MB)	Audio chip	Default operating system	Notes/ref(s).
400CS, 405CS	July 1995	Intel Pentium	75	Color STN	10.4	640×480	8 (40)	810 MB	C&T 65546	1	ESS688 and Yamaha OPL3 with supporting Sound Blaster Pro	Windows for Workgroups 3.11, Windows 3.11 (before October 1995) or Windows 95 (after October 1995)	
400CDT	July 1995	Intel Pentium	75	Color TFT	10.4	640×480	8 (40)	810 MB	C&T 65546	1	ESS688 and Yamaha OPL3	Windows for Workgroups 3.11, Windows 3.11 (before October 1995) or Windows 95 (after October 1995)	
410CS, 415CS	October 1995	Intel Pentium	90	Color STN	11.3	800×600	8 (40)	810 MB	C&T 65548	1	ESS688 and Yamaha OPL3	Windows for Workgroups 3.11 or Windows 95	
410CDT	October 1995	Intel Pentium	90	Color TFT	11.3	800×600	8 (40)	810 MB	C&T 65548	1	ESS688 and Yamaha OPL3	Windows for Workgroups 3.11 or Windows 95	
420CDS, 425CDS	June 1996	Intel Pentium	100	Color STN	11.3	800×600	8 (40)	810 MB	C&T 65550	2	ESS688 and Yamaha OPL3	Windows for Workgroups 3.11 or Windows 95	
420CDT, 425CDT	June 1996	Intel Pentium	100	Color TFT	11.3	800×600	8 (40)	1.35 GB	C&T 65550	2	ESS688 and Yamaha OPL3	Windows for Workgroups 3.11 or Windows 95	
430CDS, 435CDS	November 1996	Intel Pentium	120	Color STN	11.3	800×600	16 (48)	1.35 GB	C&T 65550	2	ESS688 and Yamaha OPL3	Windows for Workgroups 3.11 or Windows 95	
430CDT, 435CDT	November 1996	Intel Pentium	120	Color TFT	11.3	800×600	16 (48)	1.35 GB	C&T 65550	2	ESS688 and Yamaha OPL3	Windows for Workgroups 3.11 or Windows 95	
440CDX, 445CDX	June 1997	Intel Pentium MMX	133	Color STN (HPA)	12.1	800×600	16 (144)	2.16 GB	C&T F65554	2	Yamaha OPL3 SA3	Windows for Workgroups 3.11 (optional, only on 4x0 models) or Windows 95	
440CDT, 445CDT	June 1997	Intel Pentium MMX	133	Color TFT	12.1	800×600	16 (144)	2.16 GB	C&T F65554	2	Yamaha OPL3 SA3	Windows for Workgroups 3.11 (optional, only on 4x0 models) or Windows 95	
460CDX, 465CDX	November 1997	Intel Pentium MMX	166	Color STN (HPA)	12.1	800×600	32 (160)	2.16 GB	C&T F65554	2	Yamaha OPL3 SA3	Windows for Workgroups 3.11 (optional, only on 4x0 models) or Windows 95	
460CDT, 465CDT	June 1997	Intel Pentium MMX	166	Color TFT	12.1	800×600	32 (160)	2.16 GB	C&T F65554	2	Yamaha OPL3 SA3	Windows for Workgroups 3.11 (optional, only on 4x0 models) or Windows 95	
470CDT, 475CDT	February 1998	Intel Pentium MMX	200	Color TFT	12.1	800×600	32 (160)	2.16 GB	C&T F65555	2	Yamaha OPL3 SA3	Windows 95	
480CDT	November 1997	Intel Pentium MMX	233	Color TFT	12.1	800×600	32 (160)	3.8 GB	C&T F65555	2	Yamaha OPL3 SA3	Windows 95	
490CDT	April 1998	Intel Pentium II-M	233	Color TFT	12.1	800×600	32 (160)	3.8 GB	S3 ViRGE 2MX 3D	2	Yamaha OPL3 SA3	Windows 95 or Windows NT 4.0	
490XCDT	April 1998	Intel Pentium II-M	266	Color TFT	13.3	1024×768	32 (160)	3.8 GB	S3 ViRGE 2MX 3D	2	Yamaha OPL3 SA3	Windows 95 or Windows NT 4.0	
