= DECpc =

Series of computers by Digital Equipment Corporation

Wordmark of DECpc

DECpc was a wide-ranging family of desktop computers, laptops, servers, and workstations sold by Digital Equipment Corporation. The vast majority in the family are based on x86 processors, although the AXP 150 uses DEC's own Alpha processor.

The line was DEC's attempt to finally succeed in selling IBM PC compatibles; even its existing customers were buying PCs from Compaq and Hewlett-Packard. The company said that while "the Digital of yesterday was not known for competitive prices, this new line of PC offerings is competitive in features and price". Some entries in the desktop DECpc range were built by Olivetti S.p.A. and Tandy Corporation.

== Line-up ==
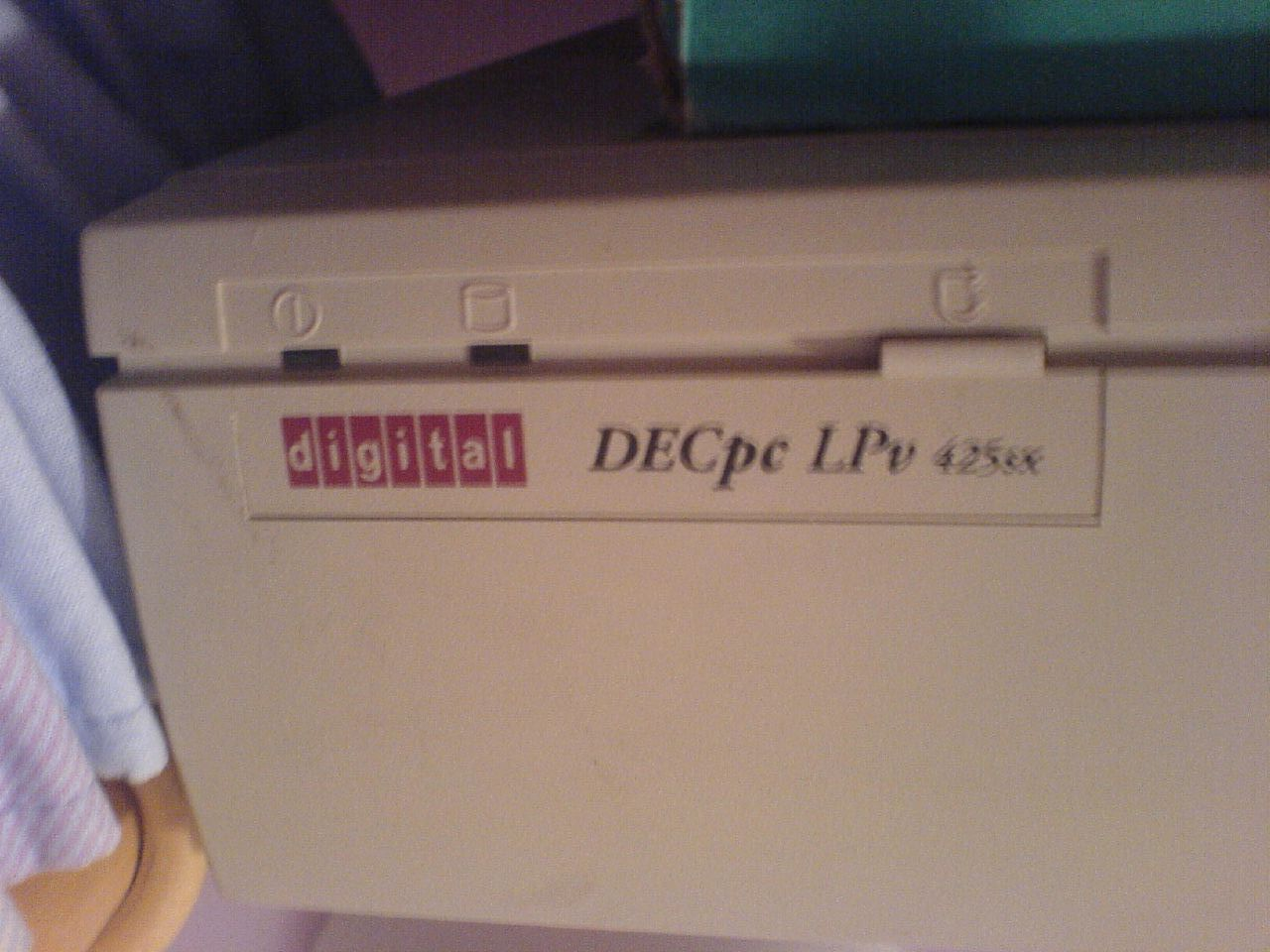
Close-up of a DECpc LPv 425sx

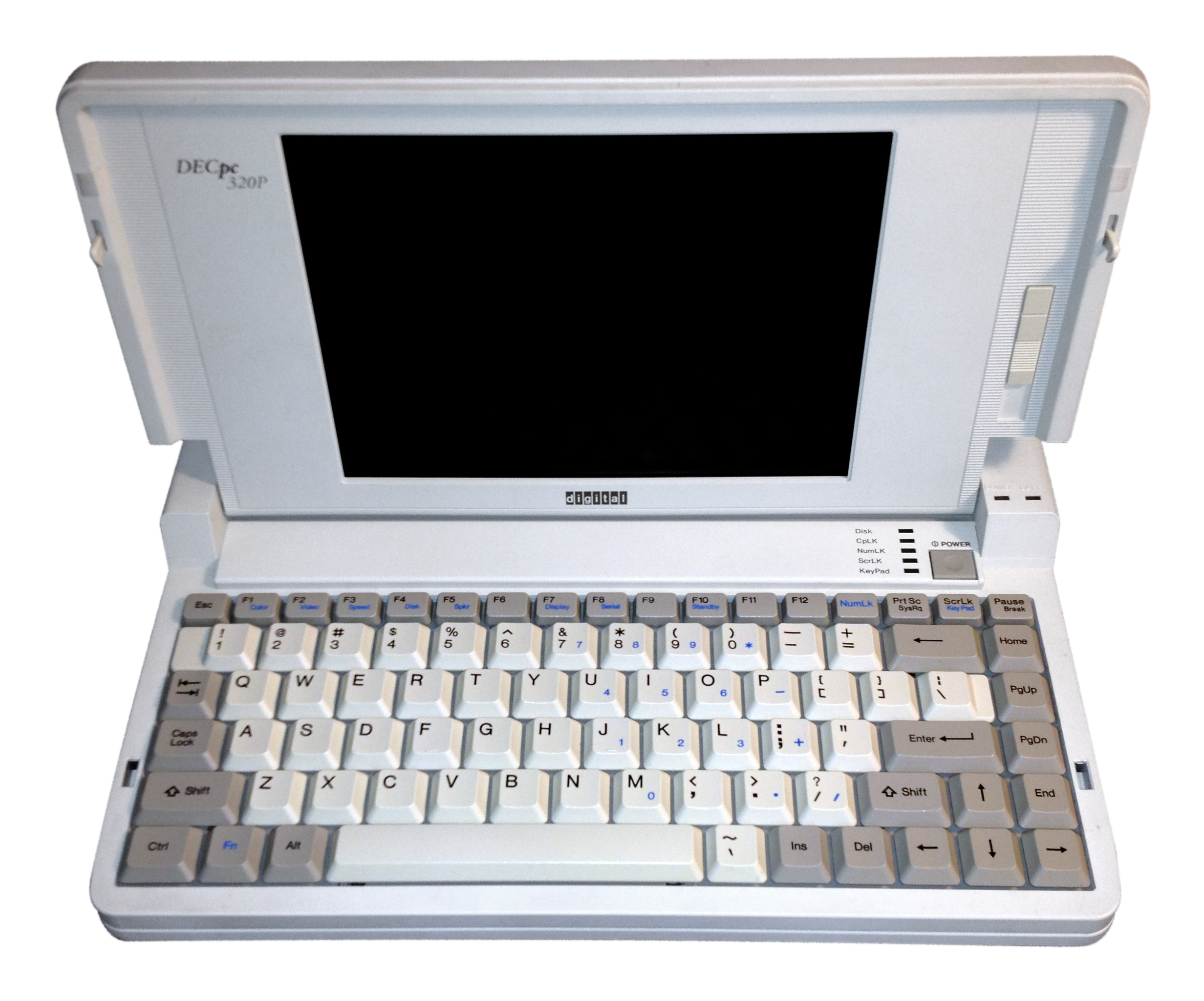
DECpc 320P

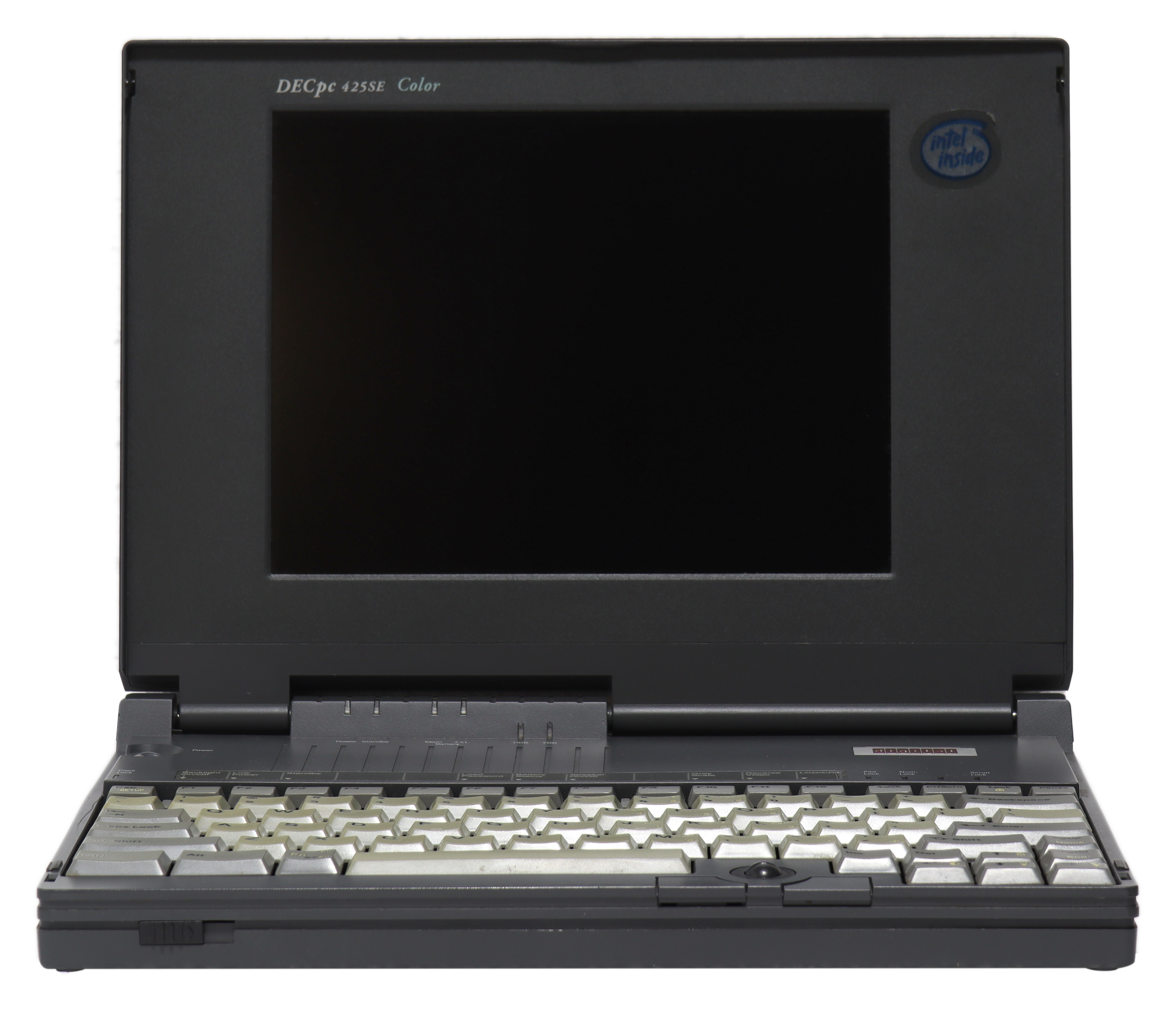
DECpc 425SE Color

Explanatory notes
† Upgradable with snap-in processor/cache daughtercard
‡ Advanced Power Management–compliant

=== Desktops ===
Model	Processor	Clock speed	Form factor	Drive bays	Bus architecture	Expansion slots	Date introduced
320sx LP	386SX	20	Small-form-factor desktop	1 × 5.25-in 3 × 3.5-in (2 internal)	ISA		April 1992
325sx LP	386SX	25	Small-form-factor desktop	1 × 5.25-in 3 × 3.5-in (2 internal)	ISA		April 1992
333sx LP	386SX	33	Small-form-factor desktop	1 × 5.25-in 3 × 3.5-in (2 internal)	ISA, VLB		November 1992
340dx LP	386DX†	40	Small-form-factor desktop	1 × 5.25-in 3 × 3.5-in (2 internal)	ISA, VLB		November 1992
425sx LP	486SX†	25	Small-form-factor desktop	1 × 5.25-in 3 × 3.5-in (2 internal)	ISA, VLB		November 1992
433dx LP	486DX†	33	Small-form-factor desktop	1 × 5.25-in 3 × 3.5-in (2 internal)	ISA, VLB		November 1992
450d2 LP	486DX2†	50	Small-form-factor desktop	1 × 5.25-in 3 × 3.5-in (2 internal)	ISA, VLB		November 1992
466d2 LP	486DX2†	66	Small-form-factor desktop	1 × 5.25-in 3 × 3.5-in (2 internal)	ISA, VLB		November 1992
LPv 425sx	486DX†	25	Small-form-factor desktop	1 × 5.25-in 3 × 3.5-in (2 internal)	ISA, VLB		August 1993
LPv 433dx	486DX	33	Small-form-factor desktop	1 × 5.25-in 3 × 3.5-in (2 internal)	ISA, VLB	3	1993
LPv 450d2	486DX2	50	Small-form-factor desktop	1 × 5.25-in 3 × 3.5-in (2 internal)	ISA, VLB	3	1993
LPx 433sx	486SX	33	Full desktop	3 × 5.25-in 1 × 3.5-in	ISA, VLB		1993
LPx 433dx	486DX	33	Full desktop	3 × 5.25-in 1 × 3.5-in	ISA, VLB		1993
LPx 450d2	486DX2	50	Full desktop	3 × 5.25-in 1 × 3.5-in	ISA, VLB		1993
LPx 466d2	486DX2	66	Full desktop	3 × 5.25-in 1 × 3.5-in	ISA, VLB		1993
MTE 433dx	486DX	33	Mini-tower	5 × 5.25-in 1 × 3.5-in	EISA	5	1993
MTE 466d2	486DX2	66	Mini-tower	5 × 5.25-in 1 × 3.5-in	EISA	5	1993
ST			Full tower	5 × 5.25-in 1 × 3.5-in	EISA	8 (2 proprietary)	1993
LPv+ 425sx	486SX	25	Small-form-factor desktop	1 × 5.25-in 3 × 3.5-in (2 internal)	ISA, VLB‡	3	January 1994
LPv+ 433sx	486SX	33	Small-form-factor desktop	1 × 5.25-in 3 × 3.5-in (2 internal)	ISA, VLB‡	3	January 1994
LPv+ 433dx	486DX	33	Small-form-factor desktop	1 × 5.25-in 3 × 3.5-in (2 internal)	ISA, VLB‡	3	January 1994
LPv+ 450d2	486DX2	50	Small-form-factor desktop	1 × 5.25-in 3 × 3.5-in (2 internal)	ISA, VLB‡	3	January 1994
LPv+ 466d2	486DX2	66	Small-form-factor desktop	1 × 5.25-in 3 × 3.5-in (2 internal)	ISA, VLB‡	3	January 1994
LPv+ 4100	486DX4	100	Small-form-factor desktop	1 × 5.25-in 3 × 3.5-in (2 internal)	ISA, VLB‡	3	May 1994
LPx+ 450d2	486DX2	50	Full desktop	3 × 5.25-in 1 × 3.5-in	ISA, VLB‡		May 1994
LPx+ 4100	486DX4	100	Full desktop	3 × 5.25-in 1 × 3.5-in	ISA, VLB‡		May 1994

=== Laptops ===
Model	Processor	Clock speed	Max. RAM (MB)	LCD technology and size (diagonal)	Manufacturer	Date introduced
320P	80386SX	20	8	Passive-matrix monochrome, 7 in	PTCC, Inc. (Tandy–Matsushita)	February 1992
325P	80386SL	25		Passive-matrix monochrome, 10 in	PTCC, Inc.	November 1992
325SL	80386SL	25		Passive-matrix monochrome, 10 in	AST Research	1993
325SLC	80386SL	25		Passive-matrix color, 9.5 in	AST Research	1993
425SL	80486SL	25	32	Passive-matrix monochrome, 10 in	AST Research	1993
425SLC	80486SL	25	32	Active-matrix color, 9.5 in	AST Research	1993
433SLC Premium	80486SL	33	32	Active-matrix color, 9.5 in	AST Research	January 1994
425SE	80486SL	25	20	Passive-matrix monochrome, 9.5 in	AST Research	January 1994
425SE Color	80486SL	25	20	Passive-matrix color, 9.5 in	AST Research	January 1994
433SE	80486SL	33		Passive-matrix monochrome, 9.5 in	AST Research	April 1994
433SE Color	80486SL	33		Passive-matrix color, 9.5 in	AST Research	April 1994

=== Workstations and servers ===
Model	Processor	Clock speed	Form factor	Drive bays	Bus architecture	Expansion slots	Date introduced
XL Server 466	486DX2	66	Full tower	9	EISA, PCI	7 (4 EISA, 2 PCI, 1 proprietary, dual-use network bus)	March 1994
XL Server 560	Pentium	60	Full tower	9	EISA, PCI	7 (4 EISA, 2 PCI, 1 proprietary, dual-use network bus)	March 1994
XL Server 566	Pentium	66	Full tower	9	EISA, PCI	7 (4 EISA, 2 PCI, 1 proprietary, dual-use network bus)	March 1994

== See also ==
- Digital HiNote, the successor to the DECpc line of laptops
- DECstation, concurrent line of workstations
