= Dynabook Satellite =

Line of laptops by Toshiba

Satellite Pro

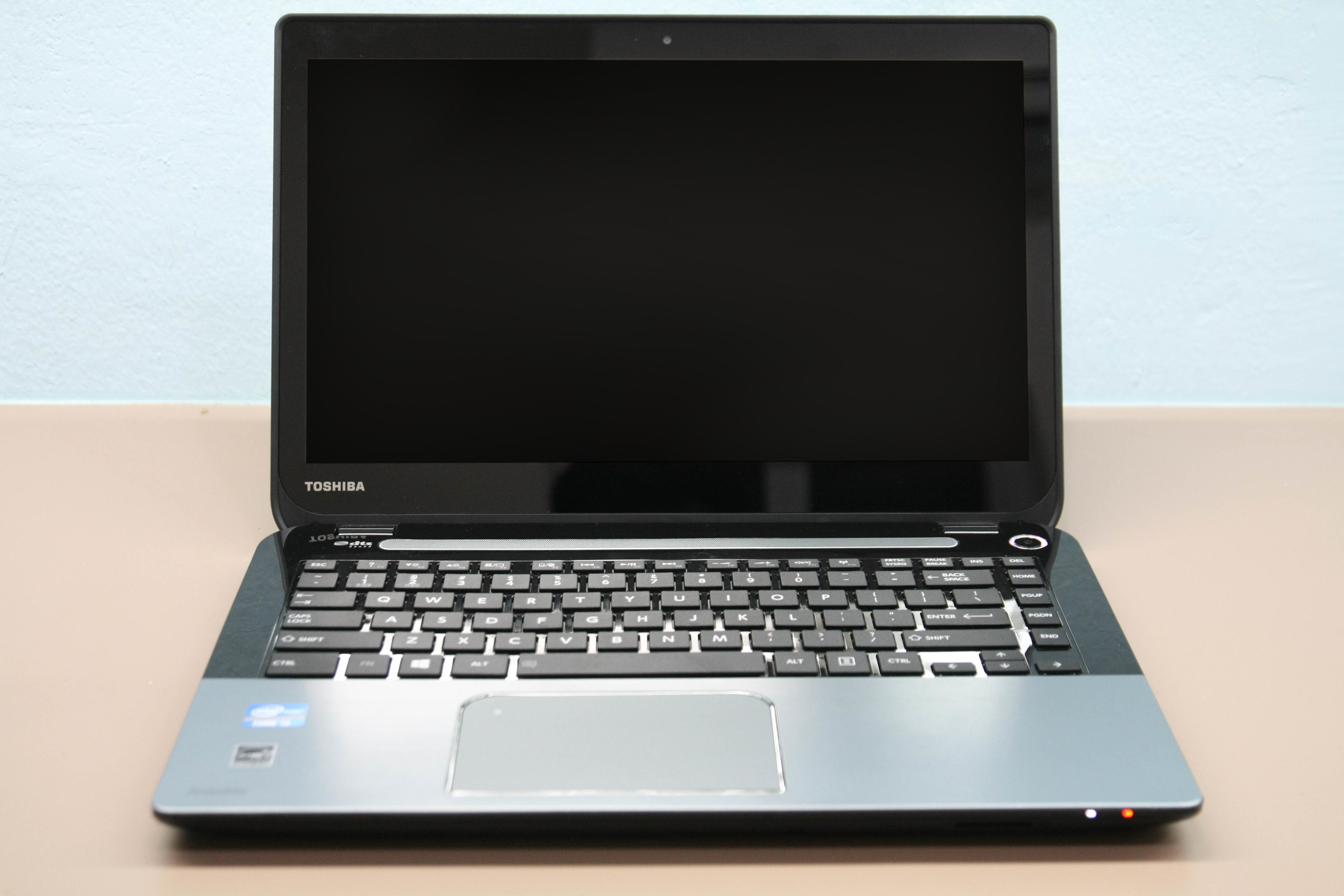
- Toshiba Satellite S40t Windows 8 laptop
- Also known as: Toshiba Satellite (1992–2016); Dynabook Satellite
- Developer: Toshiba (1992-2016); Dynabook Inc. (2020-present)
- Manufacturer: Toshiba; Dynabook Inc.
- Type: Laptop
- Released: 1992; 34 years ago
- Lifespan: 1992–2016 (Satellite); 1994–2016, 2020–present (Satellite Pro)
- Operating system: Windows
- CPU: AMD, Intel
- Graphics: AMD, Nvidia
- Marketing target: Consumer

The Satellite Pro (also formerly the Satellite) is a line of consumer-oriented laptop computers designed and manufactured by Dynabook Inc. of Japan, which was formerly Toshiba's computer subsidiary. The Satellite Pro is currently positioned between their consumer E series and their business Tecra series of products.

The earliest models in the series, introduced in the early 1990s, were one of the first to directly compete against IBM's ThinkPad line. Models in Toshiba's Satellite family varied greatly—from entry-level models sold to consumers at major retailers to full-fledged business laptops, with the “Pro” suffix, sold through enterprise channels. In 2016, the Satellite line came to an end when Toshiba exited the consumer personal computer market; in 2020, after Sharp Corporation purchased the computer division as Dynabook, the Satellite Pro was relaunched.

== History ==
The early models did not come with an internal CD-ROM drive, but these soon appeared as mobile technology progressed. Such models can link up with an external CD-ROM drive through the parallel port on the rear (since USB ports came later as well). Some Satellites also lacked an internal floppy disk drive, but a port on the side allowed the use of a proprietary external module for such. These machines tended to be smaller in physical size than their contemporaries.

A Toshiba Satellite personal computer was used to send the first email ever sent by a sitting U.S. president in the course of their duties. The email was sent by president Bill Clinton using the device of the White House Medical Unit emergency physician Robert G. Darling in response to an email by the astronaut John Glenn, who was aboard the Space Shuttle Discovery.

Notable models included the Satellite 5005-S507, which was the first to ship with NVIDIA GeForce 4 440 Go GPU and cost $1,999. The Satellite 5105-S607 was the first laptop with cPad technology and cost $2,499. The Satellite 5205-S703 was the first laptop with built-in DVD-R/RW drive and cost $2,699.

Sharp Corporation obtained 80.1% of Toshiba's computer subsidiary in October 2018. In April 2019, Sharp renamed the subsidiary Dynabook Inc. In 2020, Toshiba sold their remaining shares to Sharp, which resurrected the Satellite Pro series that year.

== Satellite models (until 2016) ==
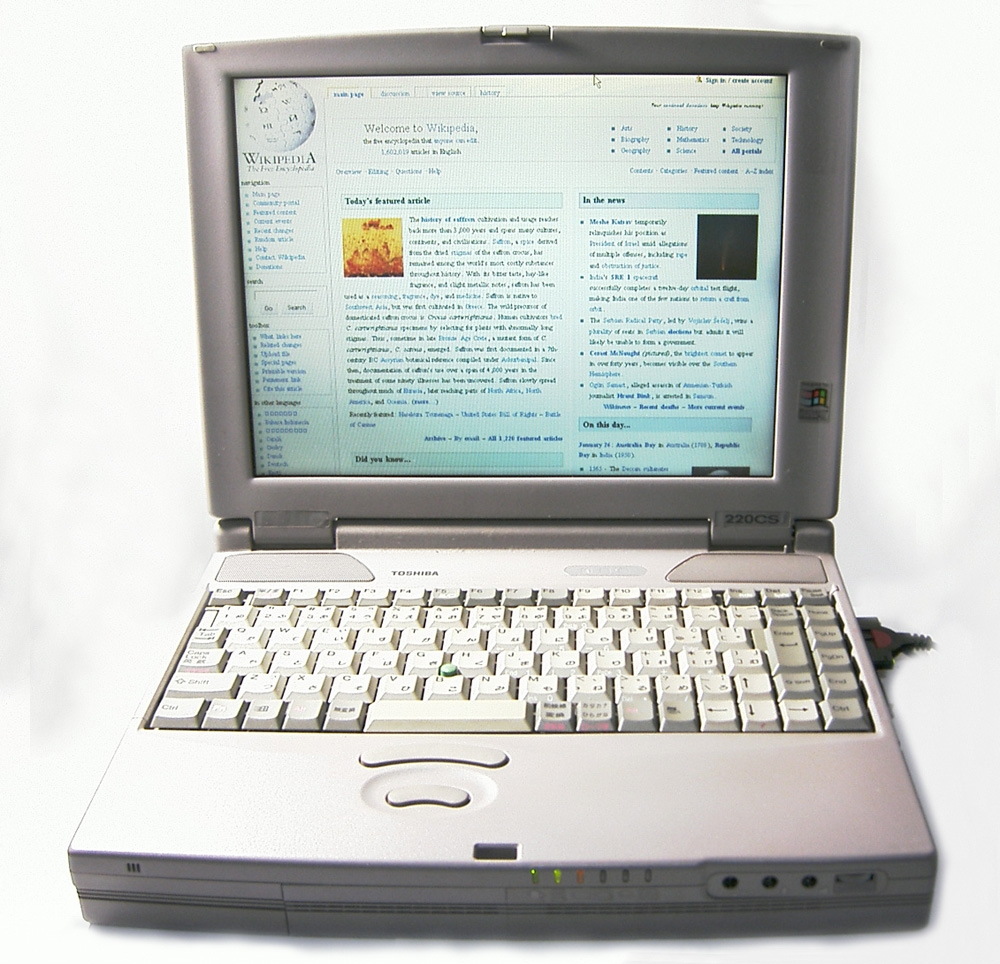
Toshiba Satellite 220cs

=== Numeric ===
The Satellite line was introduced in 1992 with the T1800 and T1850 models, the T1850C variant of which was one of the first notebooks with passive-matrix color liquid-crystal displays (LCDs). Succeeding entries in the line followed this naming scheme, such as the Satellite T1900, T2110CS and T2130CS. Beginning with the barebones 100CS and 100CT in February 1996, Toshiba began using only numbers to name their Satellites, a convention which continued until 2003 with the introduction of the Satellite A series.

=== Lettered ===
Toshiba began using letter prefixes to differentiate its concurrent series of Satellite laptops. These included the A series; the C series; the E series; the L series; the M series; the P series; the R series; the S series; the T series; the U series; and the W series. CNET wrote in 2011 that "Toshiba may not run out of new product lines until it runs out of letters".

==== A series ====
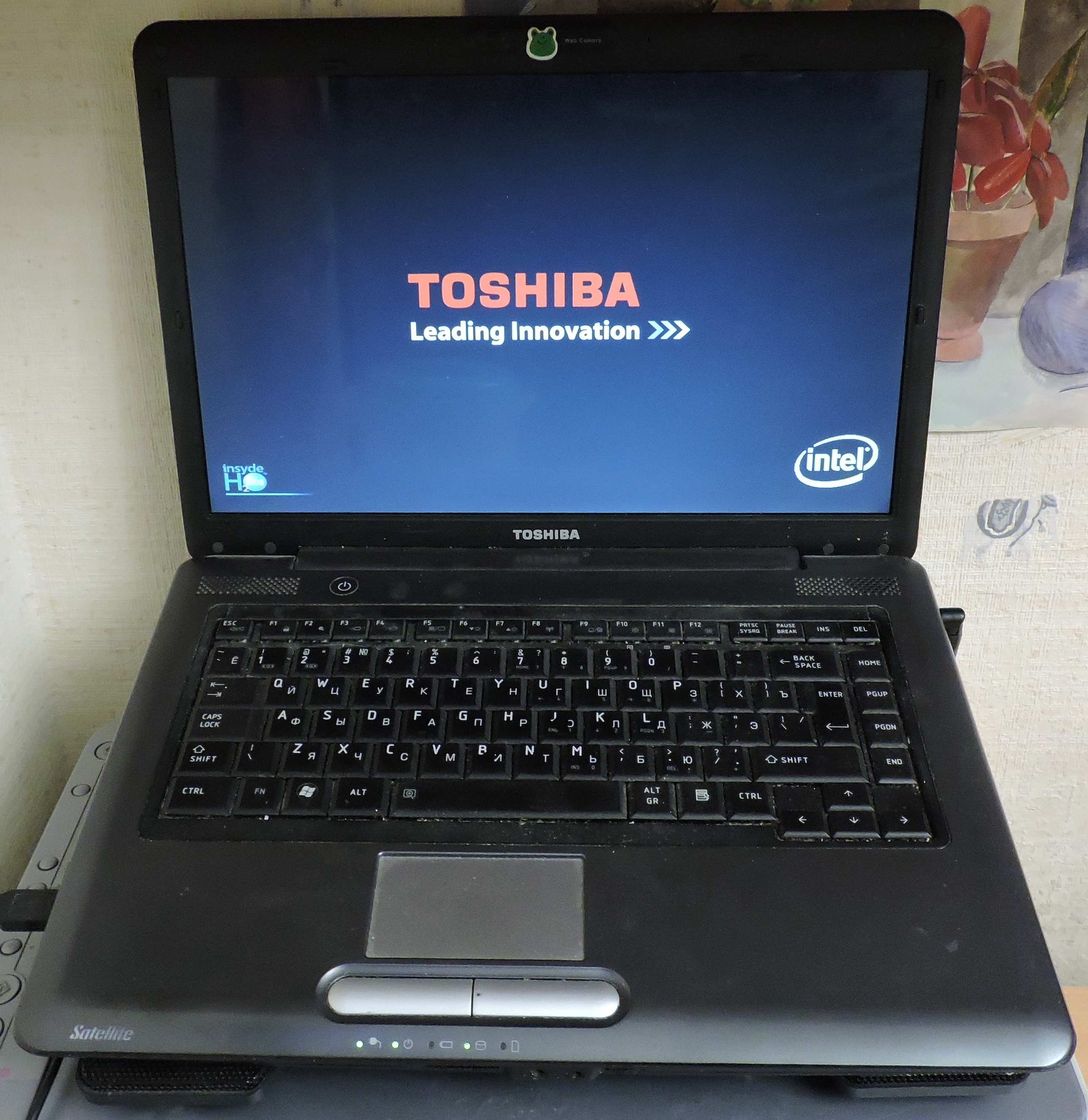
Satellite A300

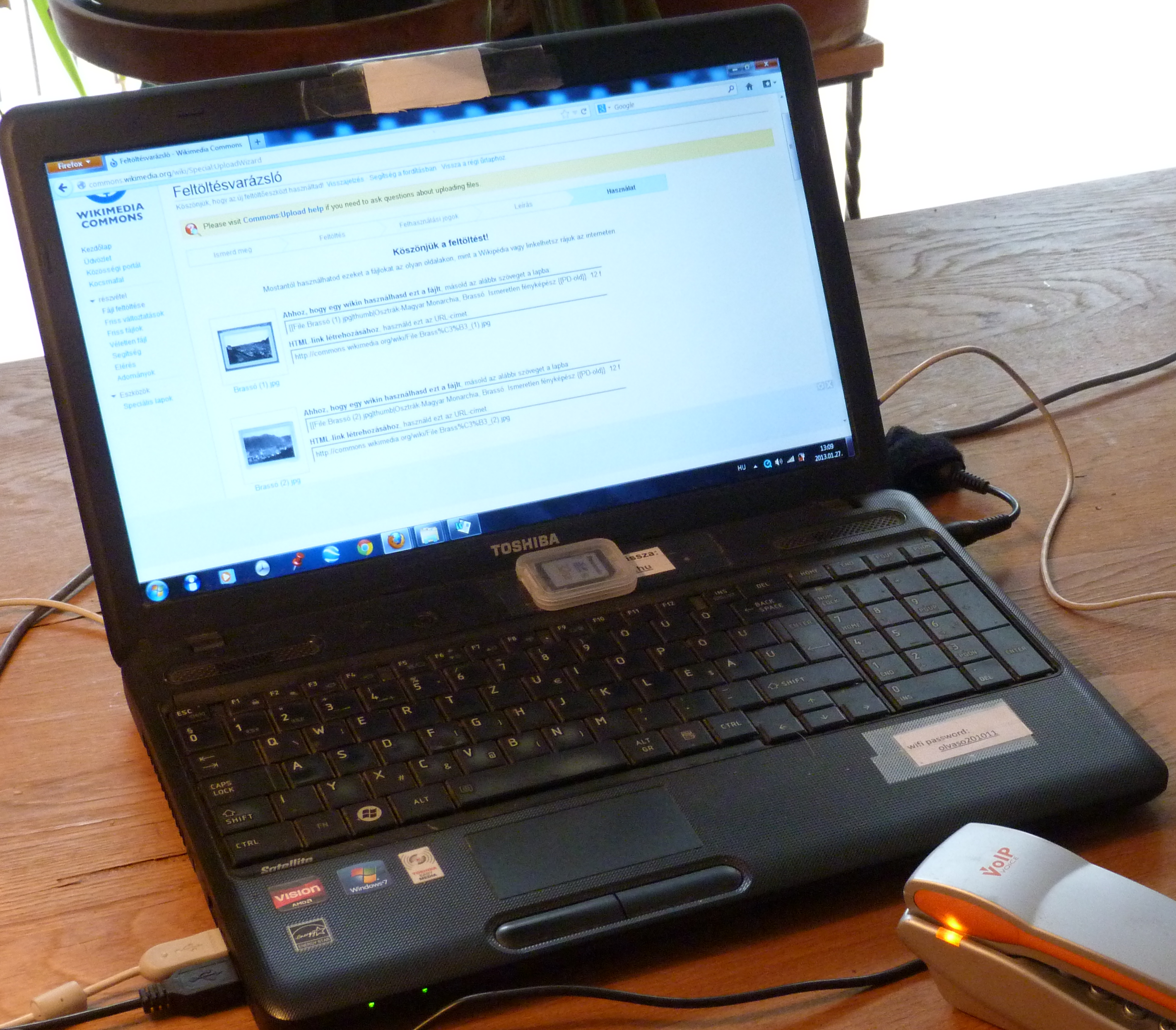
Satellite C650

The Satellite A series was Toshiba's first premium consumer line of Satellite laptops. Introduced with the A10 and A20 models in 2003, the Satellite A series originally targeted high school and college students and workers of small offices and home offices, before becoming a premium line by the late 2000s. The Satellite A series was succeeded by the Satellite P series in 2011.

==== C series ====
The Satellite C series was Toshiba's budget consumer line of Satellite laptops. Screen sizes on the C series ranged between 14 and 17 inches diagonally; the laptops were offered with Intel or AMD processors.

==== E series ====
The 2010s-issue E-series Satellites were Best Buy-exclusive midrange consumer models.

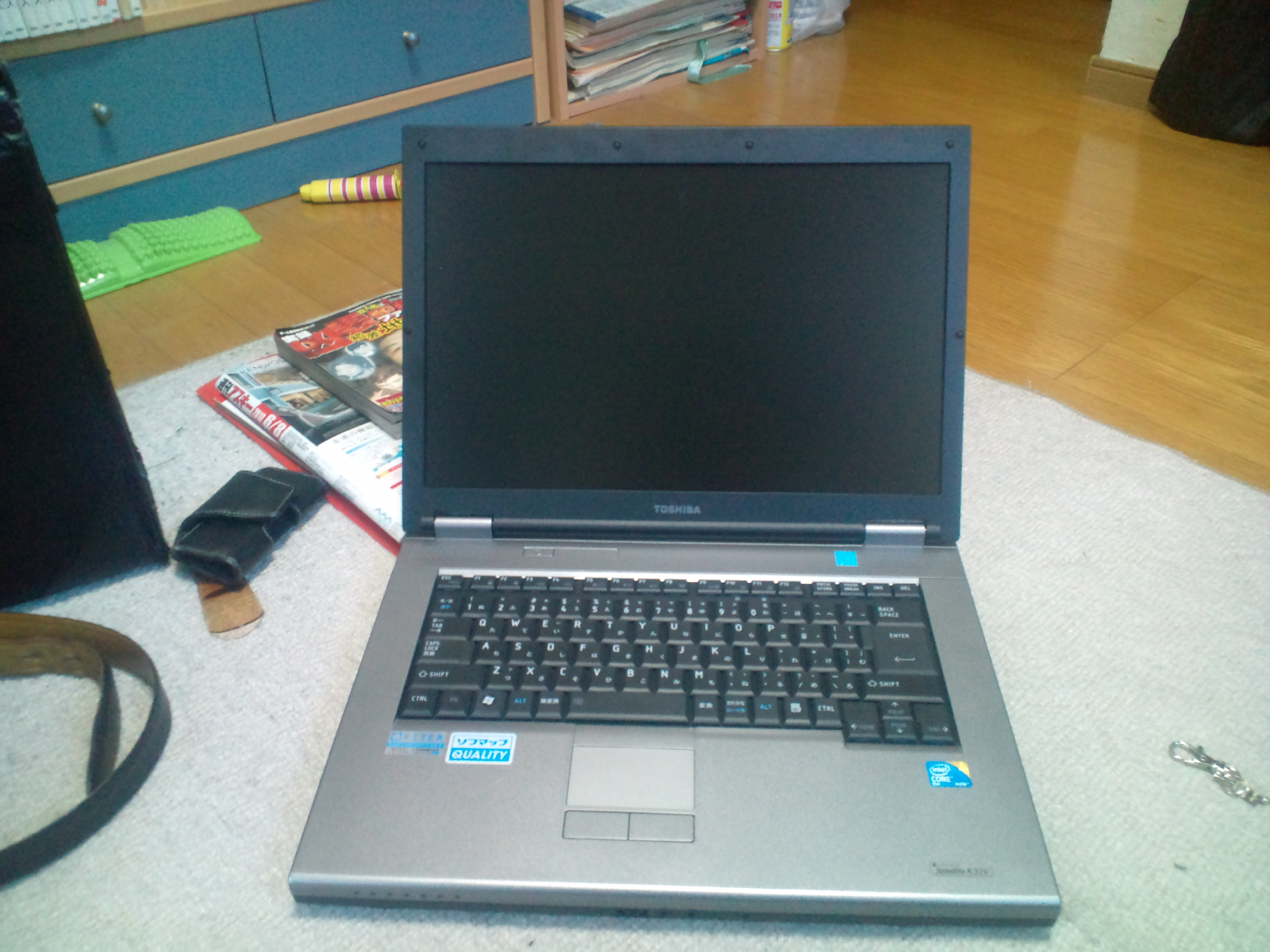
K32V

==== L series ====
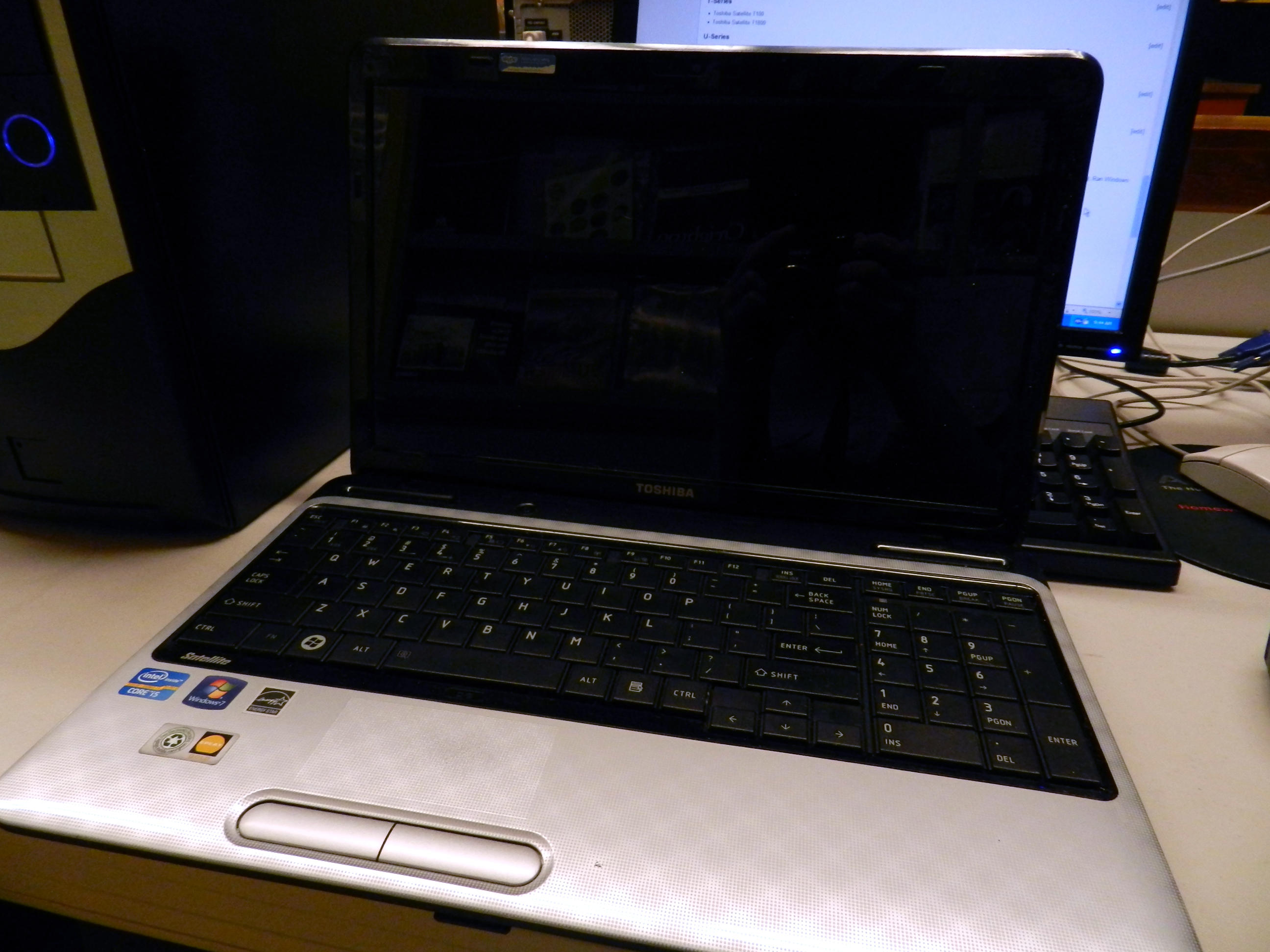
Toshiba Satellite L750

The L series Satellites were Toshiba's mainstream consumer line of Satellite laptops. The first models of the L series came out in 2005. The 2010s-issue L series was priced just above the C series and included similar features but featured improved keyboards, trackpads, and speakers, USB 3.0 ports, and Core i7 processor configurations. Toshiba targeted the L series at students.

==== M series, U series ====
The M and U series Satellites were marketed as multimedia-oriented machines, powerful enough for casual gaming and video playback while still being lightweight enough to be easily mobile. Toshiba marketed the U series as the more stylish of the two.

==== P series ====
The P series was Toshiba's second premium consumer line of Satellite laptops. Introduced in 2003, it later eclipsed the premium A series. The first entry in the series, the P25, was one of the first laptops to feature a widescreen 17-inch LCD; it was also one of the first laptops to feature an internal DVD±RW drive. P series models introduced in 2012 were priced at US$800, $100 higher than their midrange S series counterparts.

==== R series ====
The R series was a convertible laptop in the Satellite line released from 2005 to 2006. It comprised the R10, R15, R20, and R25; all featured a swivel-hinge display that the user could rotate 180 degrees to cover the keyboard and use the laptops with a stylus. A non-convertible midrange entry, the R845, was released in 2011.

==== S series ====
The S series was Toshiba's midrange line of Satellite laptops introduced in 2012. It was positioned above their mainstream L series but below the premium P range. Features included Nvidia GeForce graphics processing units, Harman Kardon speakers, optional touchscreen displays and optional backlit keyboards; it was the lowest price entry of the Satellite family to offer discrete graphics. Displays ranged from 14 to 17.3-inches diagonally in size.

==== T series ====
The T series was Toshiba's line of Satellite ultrabooks.

Toshiba Satellite T series models
Model no.	Display	Processor	Chipset	Clock speed (GHz)	Graphics	RAM	Storage	Networking	Audio	Operating system	Toshiba datasheet
T115D-S1120		AMD Athlon Neo		1.60							T115D-S1120
T115D-S1125		AMD Athlon Neo X2 dual-core		1.50							T115D-S1125
T115D-SP2001		AMD Athlon Neo		1.60							T115D-SP2001
T115-S1100		Intel Celeron		1.30							T115-S1100
T115-S1108		Intel Pentium		1.30							T115-S1108
T135D-S1320; T135D-S1322		AMD Athlon Neo dual-core		1.60							T135D-S1320; T135D-S1322
T135D-S1324; T135D-S1325; T135D-S1326; T135D-S1327; T135D-S1328		AMD Turion X2 Neo dual-core		1.60							T135D-S1324; T135D-S1325; T135D-S1326; T135D-S1327; T135D-S1328
T135D-SP2012		AMD Athlon Neo X2 dual-core mobile		1.50							T135D-SP2012
T135-S1300; T135-S1305; T135-S1307; T135-S1310; T135-S1312		Intel Pentium		1.30							T135-S1300; T135-S1305; T135-S1307; T135-S1310; T135-S1312
T215D-S1140		AMD Athlon II Neo		1.70							T215D-S1140
T215D-S1150		AMD Athlon II Neo dual-core		1.30							T215D-S1150
T215D-S1160		AMD Athlon II Neo		1.70							T215D-S1160
T215D-SP1001; T215D-SP1002; T215D-SP1003		AMD Athlon		1.70							T215D-SP1001; T215D-SP1002; T215D-SP1003
T215D-SP1010; T215D-SP1011		AMD Athlon II Neo		1.70							T215D-SP1010; T215D-SP1011
T235D-S1340; T235D-S1345; T235D-S1360; T235D-S9310D		AMD Athlon II Neo dual-core		1.30							T235D-S1340; T235D-S1345; T235D-S1360; T235D-S9310D

=== Satellite Click, Satellite Radius ===
The Satellite Click and Satellite Radius were convertible laptops introduced in 2013 and 2014 respectively. The Satellite Radius had a folding hinge, while the Satellite Click's display was entirely detachable.

== Satellite Pro models (since 1994) ==
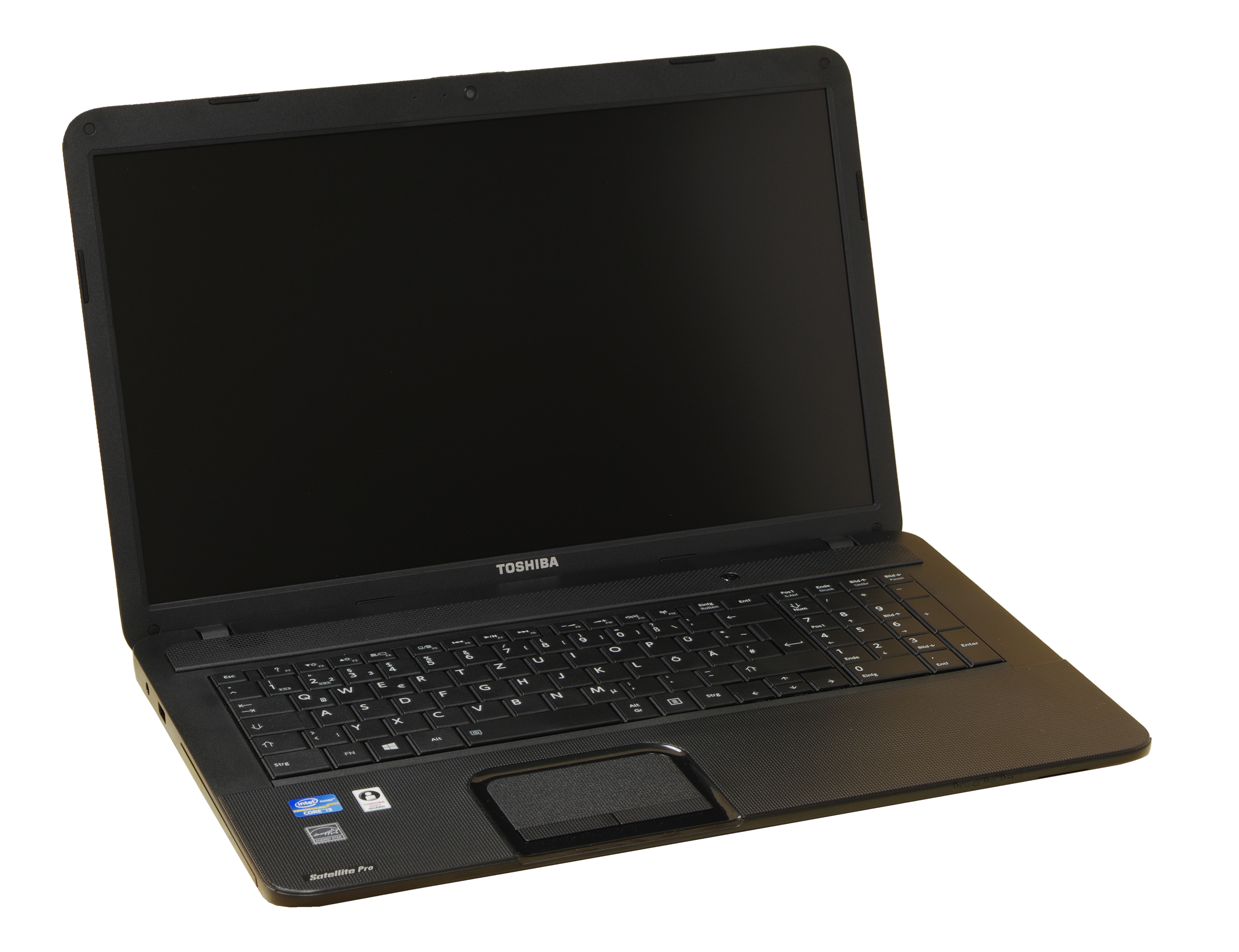
Toshiba Satellite Pro C870 (2012).

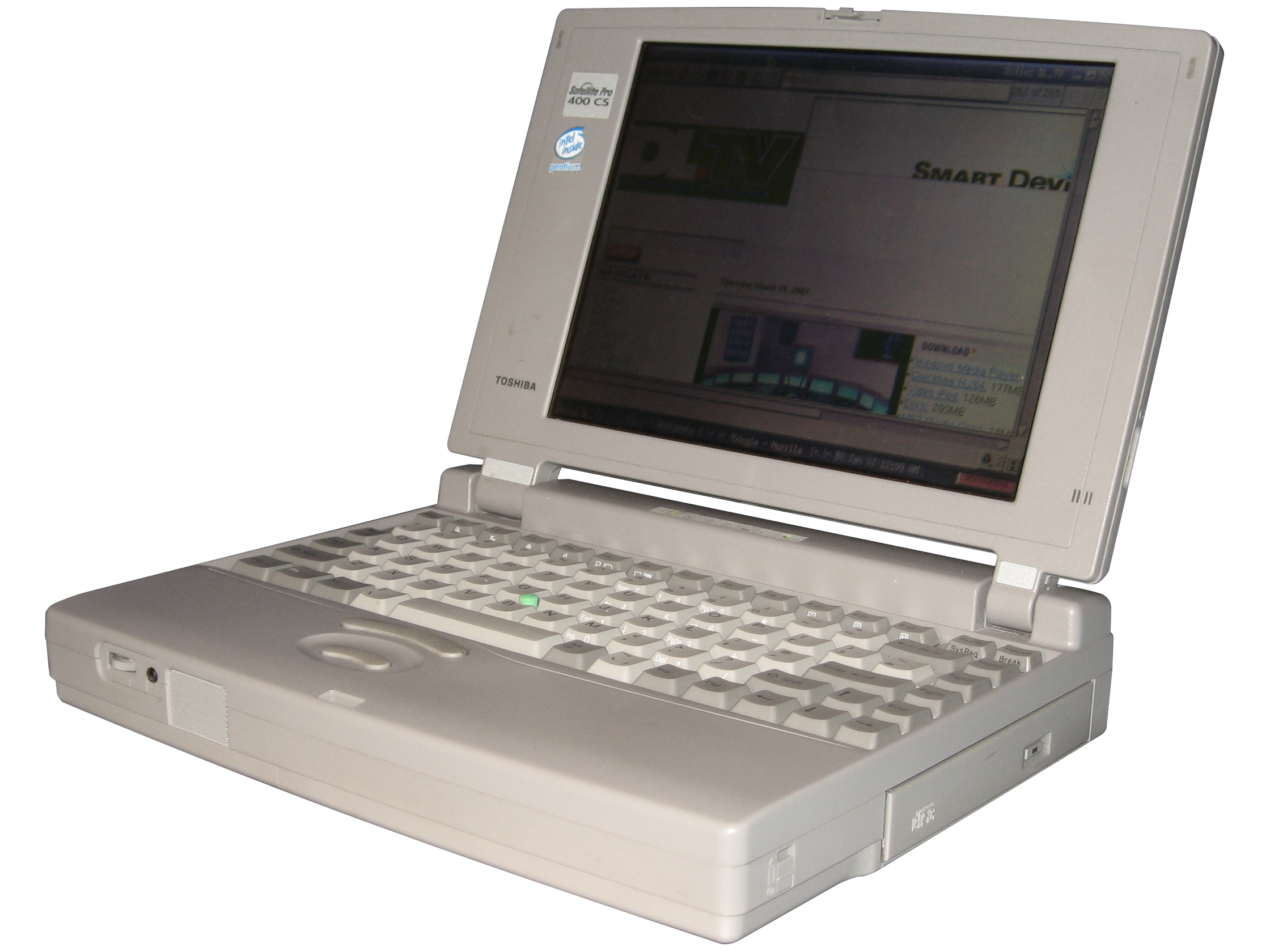
Toshiba Satellite Pro 400CS (1995)

As of 2023, Dynabook produces Satellite Pro models C40-K, C50-K, and previous generation C40-J and C50-J.

=== Satellite Pro 400 series ===
The Satellite Pro 400 series was manufactured by Toshiba from 1995 to 1999. Almost all entries in the line feature Pentium processors from Intel, with the final models featuring the Mobile Pentium II. Toshiba oriented the Satellite Pro 400 series at professionals who wanted multimedia features in a compact package; accordingly, all models feature a slot for a CD-ROM drive, built-in audio, and accelerated graphics. The Satellite Pro was a major market success for Toshiba and helped the company become the number-one global laptop manufacturer for much of the mid-1990s, beating out major competitors such as IBM and Compaq.
