= Digital HiNote =

Laptops by Digital Equipment Corporation

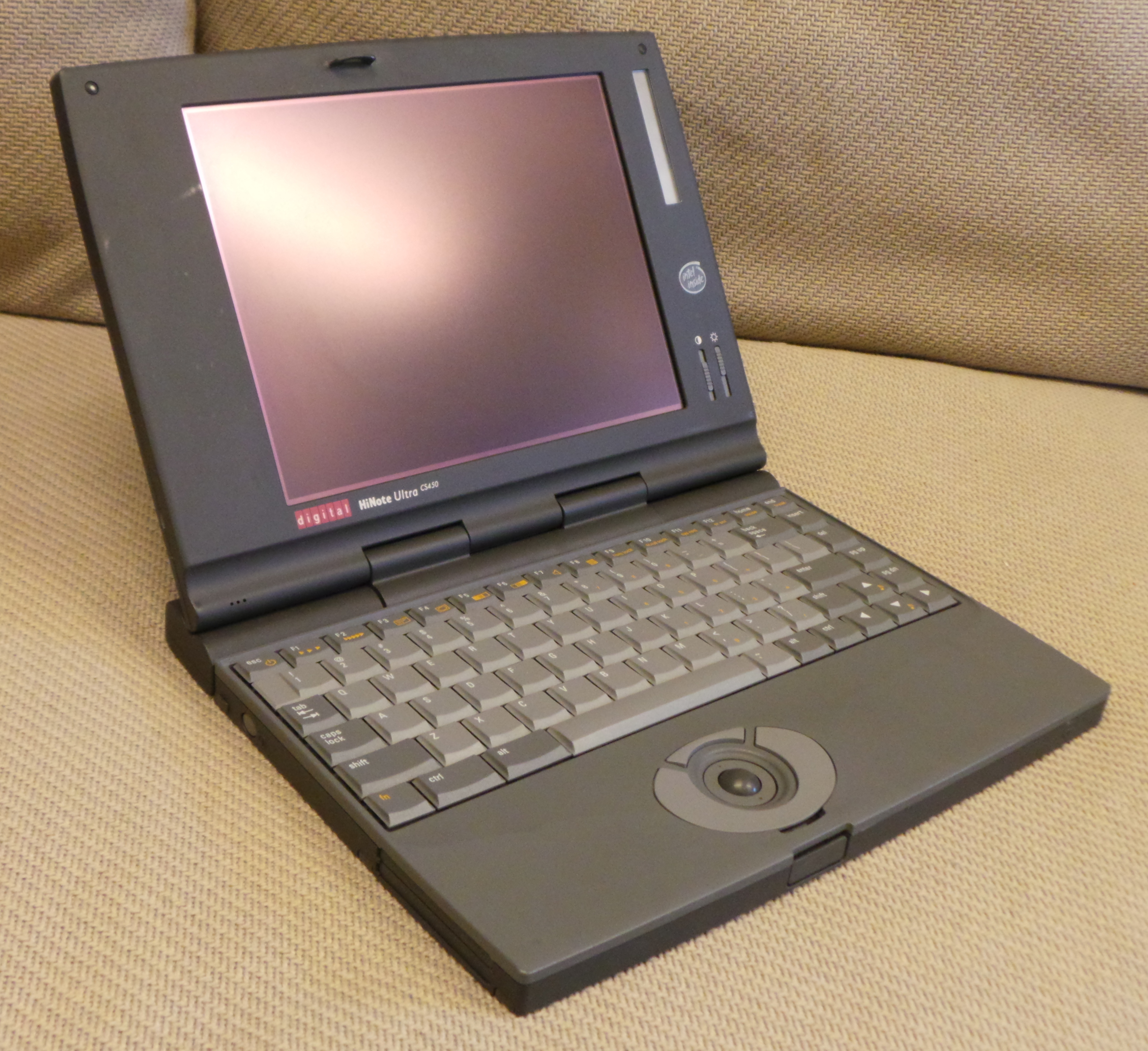
- Digital HiNote Ultra CS450
- Developer: Digital Equipment Corporation
- Manufacturer: Compal Electronics
- Type: Laptop; subnotebook
- Released: November 1994
- Discontinued: January 2002
- CPU: Intel 80486; Intel Pentium; Intel Pentium II
- Predecessor: DECpc 433SE Color
- Website: pc.digital.com at the Wayback Machine (archived 1999-01-16)

The Digital HiNote was a series of laptop computers manufactured by Digital Equipment Corporation (DEC) from 1994 until 1998 and by Compaq from 1998 until 2002. It was generally positively reviewed by technology journalists. The series consisted of the VP and Ultra models which were based on the i486, Pentium, Pentium MMX and Pentium II. After Digital was acquired by Compaq in 1998, the series was phased out.

== History ==
Digital introduced the HiNote brand of laptops in November 1994 as a successor to their x86 laptops marketed under their DECpc brand. The HiNote was introduced simultaneously with the Venturis brand of desktop and towers, which similarly replaced those form factors of x86 computers that bore the DECpc name. The initial lineup comprised a full-sized laptop simply named the HiNote and a subnotebook named the HiNote Ultra; Digital later separated the two sub-brands by designating the former as VP units. Digital offered the initial lineup with either monochrome or color passive-matrix LCDs or color active-matrix LCDs, 33 MHz Intel 486SXs to 50 MHz 486DX2s, and a hard drive capacity between 120 and 340 MB. The standard HiNote included a built-in 3.5 inch floppy drive which could be removed and fitted with a second lithium-ion battery pack in its place, while the drive for the Ultra was external only. Both the original HiNotes proper and Ultras included built-in trackballs as its pointing device of choice.

External videos
- 1995 commercial for the Digital HiNote Ultra on YouTube

Technology journalists singled out the HiNote Ultra for its sleek industrial design and modularity, which attached the lithium-ion battery to the back of the laptop with a latching mechanism instead of being inserted in the bottom case as was customary for laptop designs. This battery could be rotated to prop up the Ultra at a position more comfortable for typing for long periods of time and allowed it to accommodate the external 3.5-inch floppy disk drive underneath it when placed on a desk. It weighed 4 lb (1,8 kg) and measured only an inch (2,54 cm) high. Digital advertised on television the Ultra's thin and light stature by pulling it out of a manila envelope—an approach replicated by Apple nearly 15 years later, when it advertised its MacBook Air in 2008.

When Compaq acquired Digital in June 1998 for $9.6 billion, they left the design intact but changed the name to Armada 6500. The HiNote-based series was phased out in 2002. Technology writer Brooke Crothers wrote on CNET that its discontinuation was ironic considering that the HiNote received high industry accolades and was "one of the best notebook designs ever and one of the technological gems that Compaq inherited from Digital Equipment."

== Models ==
Line	Model no.	Processor	Clock speed (MHz)	Max. memory	LCD technology	LCD size and resolution	Date
baseline	433	486SX	33	20	Monochrome passive	9.5 in, VGA	November 1994
baseline	CS433	486SX	33	20	Color passive	9.5 in, VGA	November 1994
baseline	CS450	486DX2	50	20	Color passive	9.5 in, VGA	November 1994
baseline	CT450	486DX2	50	24	Color active	9.5 in, VGA	November 1994
baseline	CT475	486DX4	75	24	Color active	9.5 in, VGA	November 1994
baseline	CS475	486DX4	75	24	Color passive	9.5 in, VGA	August 1995
Ultra	433	486SX	33	20	Monochrome passive	9.5 in, VGA	November 1994
Ultra	CS433	486SX	33	20	Color passive	9.5 in, VGA	November 1994
Ultra	CS450	486DX2	50	20	Color passive	9.5 in, VGA	November 1994
Ultra	CT450	486DX2	50	24	Color active	9.5 in, VGA	November 1994
Ultra	CT475	486DX4	75	24	Color active	9.5 in, VGA	November 1994
Ultra	CS475	486DX4	75	24	Color passive	9.5 in, VGA	June 1995
Ultra II	CTE5100	Pentium	100	40	Color active	10.4 in, VGA	March 1996
Ultra II	CTS5100	Pentium	100	40	Color active	10.4 in, SVGA	March 1996
Ultra II	CTS5120	Pentium	120	40	Color active	10.4 in, SVGA	March 1996
Ultra II	CTS5133	Pentium	133	40	Color active	10.4 in, SVGA	March 1996
Ultra II	5150	Pentium	150	40	Color active	11.3 in, SVGA	August 1996
VP	575	Pentium	75	40	Color passive	11.3 in, SVGA	March 1996
VP	CSS5100	Pentium	100	40	Color passive	11.3 in, SVGA	March 1996
VP	CTS5100	Pentium	100	40	Color active	11.3 in, SVGA	March 1996
VP	LSS5100	Pentium	100	40	Color active	11.3 in, SVGA	September 1996
VP	520	Pentium	120	40	Color passive	11.3 in, SVGA	September 1996
VP	525	Pentium	120	40	Color active	11.3 in, SVGA	September 1996
VP	535	Pentium	133	40	Color active	11.3 in, SVGA	September 1996
VP	VSS5120	Pentium	120	80	Color passive	12.1 in, SVGA	March 1997
VP	VSS5133	Pentium	133	80	Color passive	12.1 in, SVGA	March 1997
VP	VTS5150 (545)	Pentium	150	80	Color active	12.1 in, SVGA	March 1997
VP	VTS5166	Pentium MMX	166	80	Color active	12.1 in, SVGA	March 1997
Ultra 2000	VTS 5166M	Pentium MMX	166	144	Color active	12.1 in, SVGA	April 1997
Ultra 2000	GTX 5166M	Pentium MMX	166	144	Color active	14.1 in, XVGA	May 1997
Ultra 2000	VTX 5166M	Pentium MMX	166	144	Color active	12.1 in, XVGA	April 1997
Ultra 2000	GTX 5233M	Pentium MMX	233	144	Color active	14.1 in, XVGA	January 1998
Ultra 2000	GTX 5266M	Pentium MMX	266	144	Color active	14.1 in, XVGA	January 1998
VP	703	Pentium MMX	166	144	Color passive	13 in, XVGA	January 1998
VP	717	Pentium MMX	200	144	Color active	12.1 in, SVGA	January 1998
VP	725	Pentium MMX	200	144	Color active	13.3 in, XVGA	January 1998
VP	745	Pentium MMX	266	144	Color active	13.3 in, XVGA	January 1998
VP	710	Pentium MMX	166	144	Color passive (high-performance addressing)	13.3 in, XVGA	1998
VP	715	Pentium MMX	166	144	Color active	13.3 in, XVGA	1998
VP	735	Pentium MMX	233	144	Color active	13.3 in, XVGA	November 1997
VP	765	Pentium II	266	144	Color active	13.3 in, XVGA	April 1998
