= Robert G. Darling =

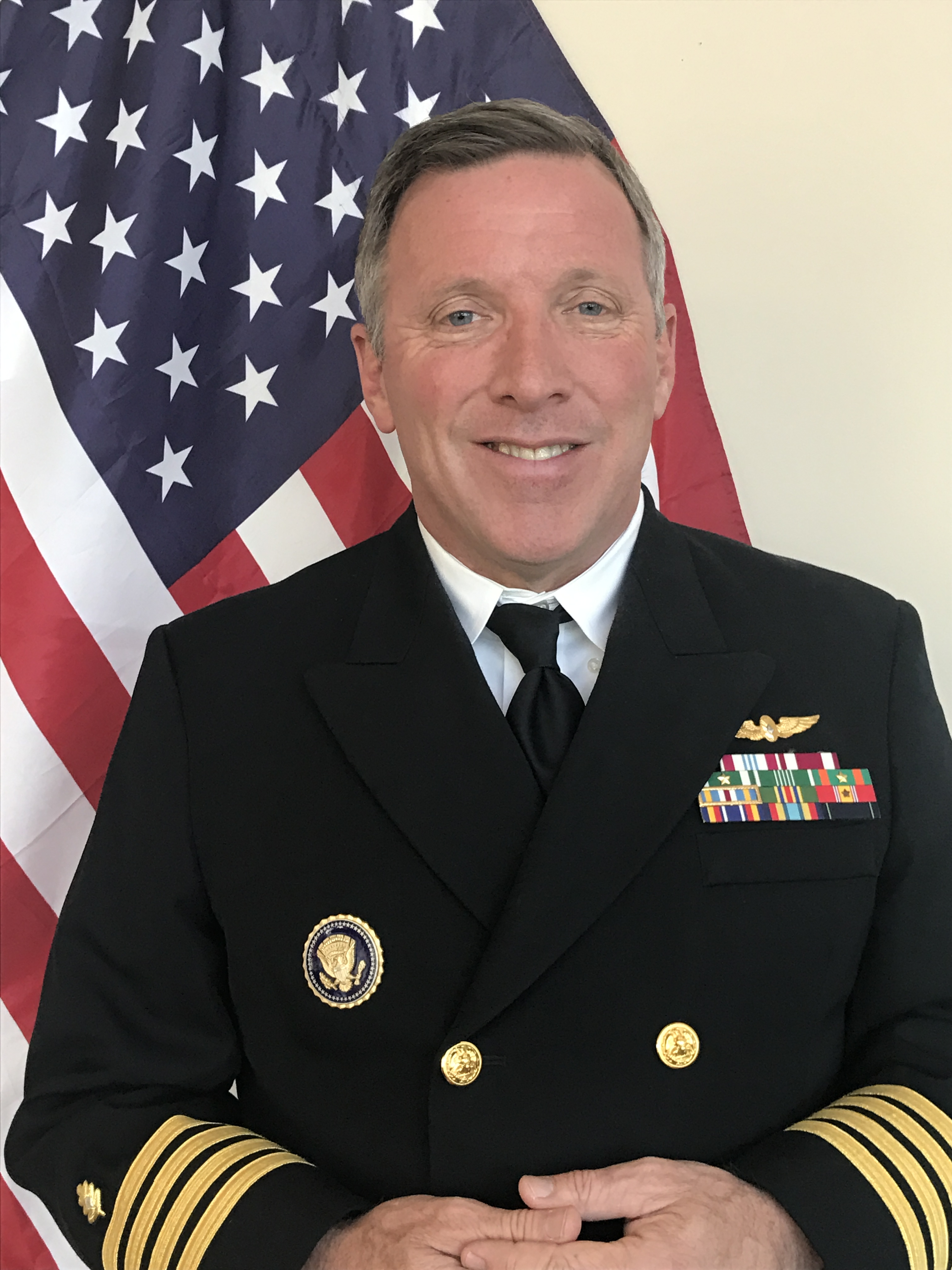
- Allegiance: United States of America
- Branch: United States Navy
- Service years: 1981–2006
- Rank: CAPTAIN (O-6)
- Awards: Presidential Service Badge; Defense Meritorious Service Medal; Meritorious Service Medal (2); Navy Commendation Medal (2); Army Commendation Medal; National Defense Service Ribbon (2); Joint Meritorious Unit Commendation (2); Navy Achievement Medal (2); Sea Service Ribbon

Dr. Robert G. Darling worked in the White House Medical Unit as the first board-certified emergency medicine physician. He provided both primary care and protective medical support services to president Bill Clinton, vice president Al Gore, their immediate families and other senior White House officials at the White House and while they traveled all over the world. During this time, Dr. Darling administered emergency and preventative medical services in over 40 countries, including numerous undeveloped regions and third-world countries with limited medical services. He practiced aboard Air Force One, Marine One and other official aircraft. He also worked with the U.S. Secret Service in the preparation for unconventional weapon attacks against the president and the creation of chemical, biological, radiological and nuclear defense (CBRNE) training and readiness programs.

On November 6, 1998, Darling facilitated the first of only two emails ever sent by president Clinton during his presidency. This email was sent to John Glenn aboard the Space Shuttle Discovery from Dr. Darling's personal Toshiba Satellite Pro 435CDS laptop computer.

Darling is currently the chief medical officer of Patronus Medical Group, a concierge healthcare practice.

== Books ==
- Associate editor, Ciottone's Disaster Medicine, 2nd Edition. Elsevier-Mosby. Philadelphia. 2016.
- Ciottone GR, Darling RG, Anderson PD, et al.; eds. Disaster Medicine. Philadelphia, Pa: Elsevier; 2006.
- Darling RG, Mothershead JL, Waeckerle JF, Eitzen EM Jr; eds. Emergency Medicine Clinics of North America, Bioterrorism. Vol. 20(2). Philadelphia, Pa: WB Saunders Company; 2002.

== Peer-reviewed articles ==
- Darling RG, Waeckerle JF, Grabenstein JD, Koenig KL. "Removing health care workers from clinical duties after smallpox vaccination: is it really necessary?"
- Cieslak TJ, Pavlin JA, Noah DL, Dire DJ, Stanek SA, Kortepeter MG, Jarrett DG, Pastel RH, Darling RG, et al. "Nuclear, biological and chemical medical defense training as a model for planners".
- Darling RG, Catlett CL, Huebner KD, et al., "Threat syndromes in bioterrorism I: CDC category agents".
- Noah DL, Huebner, KD, Darling RG, Waeckerle JF. "The history and threat of biological warfare and terrorism".
