= Yamaha YMF7xx =

Audio controllers by Yamaha

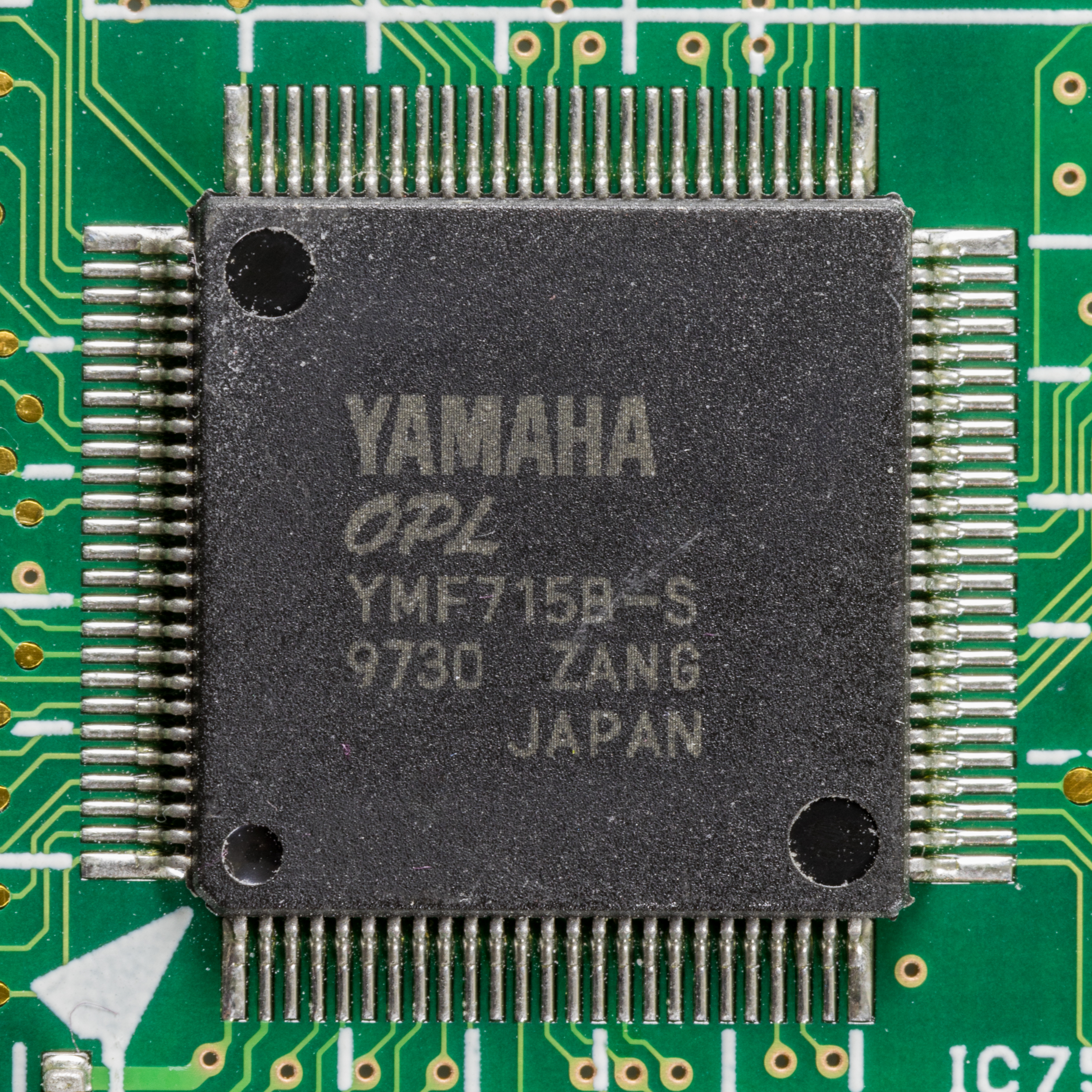
Yamaha OPL YMF715B-S

There have been various families of Yamaha audio controllers labelled as YMF7xx.

== OPL3-SA families ==
- YMF701 (OPL3-SA): Incorporates OPL3 and OPL3-L features, 16-bit stereo CODEC, MPU-401-compatible MIDI interface, game port, Plug and Play ISA interface, Windows Sound System (CS4231) and Sound Blaster Pro compatibility.
- YMF711 (OPL3-SA2): Based on OPL3-SA, it adds Plug and Play ISA compatibility, 10-pin interface supports 16-bit port address decode (top 4 bits), EEPROM interface, Zoomed video port, CPU and DAC interface for OPL4-ML, modem interface, or IDE CD-ROM interface.
- YMF715 (OPL3-SA3): Based on OPL3-SA2, the OPL3-SA3 family adds 3D audio support via DirectSound3D and QSound.

== DS-XG family ==
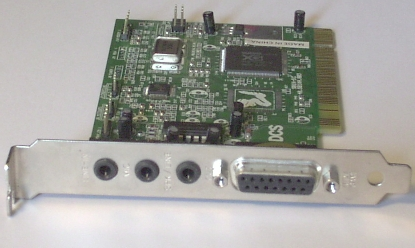
A PCI Yamaha XG sound card with a YMF724E-V chipset.

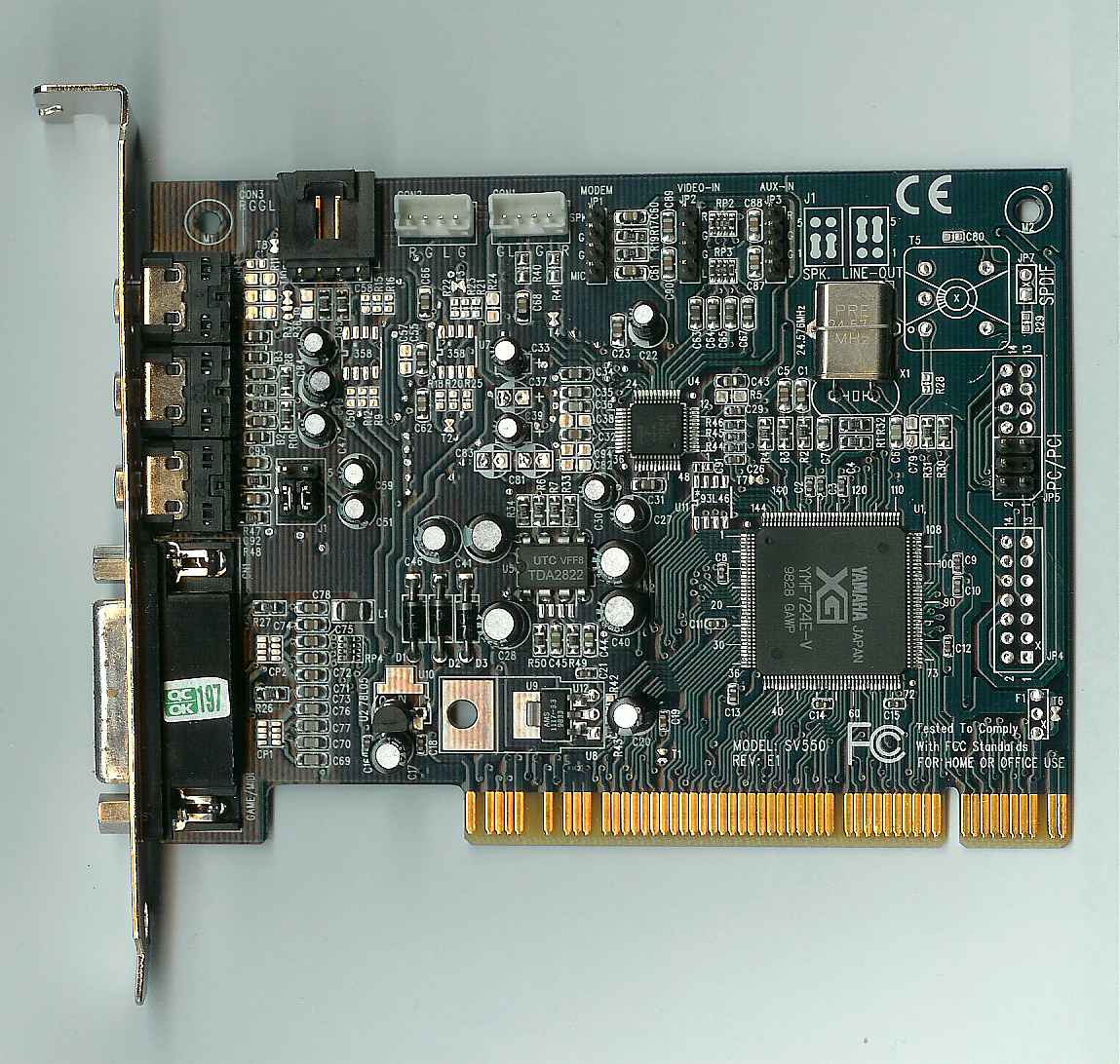
Another Yamaha XG sound card with YMF724E-V chipset.

The last model number for controller chips used on ISA bus cards is 719; chips used on PCI cards start at 720 and higher. Chips for PCI bus standalone adapters are marked YMF7x4, while on-board or embedded systems are marked YMF7x0. The DS-XG series features hardware-assisted XG MIDI synthesis with either 32- or 64-note polyphony, full-duplex playback and recording at any sample rate (internally upsampled to 48 kHz), external game controller and MIDI interface, and a legacy block for DOS application support.

The DS-XG family processors were used in many inexpensive (sub-$50) soundcards. Relative performance was good despite the typical low cost. The cards were usually equipped with good quality 18-bit Digital-to-Analogue Converters, providing similar low noise and harmonic distortion levels to those found in semi-professional hardware.

The XG synthesizer on the DS-XG series features not only basic XG System Level 1, but also some of the MU-50 additions, and can reproduce most musical data previously programmed for the popular DB50XG daughterboard. YMF7x4 cards shipped with a 2 MB bank of 8-bit samples by default, which must be loaded into system RAM during booting. Neither the resolution nor content of the sample bank are hardware limitations. A user can load their own banks using third-party tools to further improve sound quality or completely change the set of instruments. As with most other XG standard tone generators, YMF7x4 can switch itself into TG300B mode, which is an emulation of the Roland GS standard that allows adequate playback of musical data bearing the GS logo.

Legacy support includes an OPL3 FM synthesizer, Sound Blaster Pro (22 kHz 8-bit Stereo) emulation and MPU-401 compatible MIDI interface. In addition to OPL3, DOS applications running under Windows 9x/Me can also use the XG tone generator.

All of these features are available using Yamaha's VxD driver under Windows 9x/Me. WDM drivers for these operating systems and later Windows 2000/XP may lack important mixer controls, like separate Line-Out and 3D Wide. Legacy mode is not supported under NT-based OSes.

The original version of the DS-XG chipset series is the YMF724. It is limited to two-channel output. It is followed by the YMF744 and its variants, which feature four-channel output. The final and most advanced version of the YMF7x4 chipset series is the YMF754, which also features standard four-channel output, but adds lower power consumption features. The most feature-rich soundcards based on the YMF754 are the Labway XWave 6000 (which has an additional hardware chip to emulate 5.1 surround sound and a six-channel amplifier providing 2W per channel) and the Hoontech SoundTrack i-Phone Digital XG (which features an additional connector for an included speech-optimized headset microphone as well as support circuitry that limits feedback in telephony applications).

The DS-XG .vxd drivers under Windows 95, 98, 98SE or ME can switch to Sondius-XG which allows emulation of the VL70-m tone generator (except for the distortion block).

=== Models ===
- YMF724 (DS-1): First model using PCI bus. Includes 64-voice wavetable synthesizer (total 73 concurrent audio streams supported), interface to AC'97 codec, S/PDIF output, Dolby AC-3 decoder.
- YMF738: Integrated Sensaura 3D audio, AC'97 2.1 interface.
- YMF740C (DS-1L): Based on YMF724, but includes only 32-voice wavetable synthesizer (total 41 concurrent audio streams supported). It also lacks the S/PDIF and AC-3 interfaces in YMF724.
- YMF744B (DS-1S): PCI 2.2-compliant, fully 3.3V power processor based on YMF724, it adds support of ZV port, secondary AC '97 2.1 CODEC.
- YMF754 (DS-1E): Based on YMF744, it adds simultaneous usage of ZV port and S/PDIF input, 2.5V power for core logic and PLL filter, mixing SPDIF input from mixer without prior sample rate conversion.

== AC-XG family ==
The AC-XG family features AC'97 codec.

- YMF725: AC'97 codec for use with YMF724.
- YMF743: AC'97 2.1 stereo codec.
- YMF752: AC'97 2.1 stereo codec with sample rate converter.
- YMF753: AC'97 2.2 stereo codec based on YMF743.
