= High-performance addressing =

High-performance addressing (HPA) is a passive-matrix liquid-crystal display (LCD) technology commonly found on low-end laptop computers. Versions of HPA have been developed by both Hitachi and Sharp. HPA enables higher response rates and contrast, displaying up to 16-million colors; however, HPA displays lack the crispness that is found with an active-matrix display. HPA uses a technique called multiline addressing in which the incoming video signal is analyzed and the image is refreshed with a frequency as high as possible.
