= List of solid-state drive manufacturers =

This is the list of manufacturers of solid-state drives (SSDs) for computers and other electronic devices that require data storage. In the list those manufacturers that also produce hard disk drives or flash memory are identified. Additionally, the type of memory used in their solid-state drives is noted. This list does not include the manufacturers of specific components of SSDs, such as flash memory controllers.

Name	Domiciled in	Manufactures hard disk drives	Manufactures flash memory	Manufactures flash-based SSDs	Manufactures RAM-based SSDs	Manufactures flash memory controller
ADATA	Taiwan	No	No	Yes	No	No
Apacer	Taiwan	No	No	Yes	No	No
ASUS	Taiwan	No	No	Yes	No	No
ATP Electronics	Taiwan	No	No	Yes	No	No
Biostar	Taiwan	No	No	Yes	No	No
Corsair	United States	No	No	Yes	No	No
Crucial Technology	United States	No	Used the flash from its parent Micron Technology	Formerly through its parent Micron Technology	No	Formerly through its parent Micron Technology
Dahua Technology	China	No	No	Yes	No	No
Dataram	United States	No	No	Yes	No	No
Dell	United States	No	Yes, through its stake in Kioxia	Yes	No	Yes, through its stake in Kioxia
Edge Tech Corp	United States	No	No	Yes	No	No
EMTEC	France	No		Yes	No	
Fujitsu	Japan			Yes		
Fusion-io	United States	No	Formerly through Flash Forward, a joint venture owned by Kioxia and Fusion-IO's parent, SanDisk	Formerly	No	Formerly
G.Skill	Taiwan	No	No	Yes	No	No
GALAX	Hong Kong	No	No	Yes	No	No
Gigabyte Technology	Taiwan	No	No	Yes	i-RAM	No
Greenliant Systems	United States	No	No	Yes	No	Yes
GS Nanotech	Russia	No	No	Yes	No	No
Hewlett-Packard	United States	No	No	Yes	No	No
Hikvision	China	No	No	Yes	No	No
HGST (owned by Western Digital)	United States and Japan	Formerly, but now absorbed into its parent, Western Digital	Formerly through Flash Forward, a joint venture between Toshiba (now Kioxia) and its then-sister company, SanDisk	Formerly, but now absorbed into its parent, Western Digital. HGST brands such as Ultrastar are now licensed out to Sandisk after WD spun off its SSD businesses into Sandisk.	No	No
HyperOs Systems	England	No	No	No	Yes	No
Imation	South Korea	No	No	Yes	No	No
Innodisk	Taiwan	No	No	Yes	No	No
Intel	United States	No	Sold its NAND flash memory and SSD businesses to SK Hynix. Intel has terminated its Optane line of memory.	Sold its NAND flash memory and SSD businesses to SK Hynix. Intel has terminated its Optane line of SSDs.	No	Sold its NAND flash memory and SSD businesses to SK Hynix, so SK Hynix now makes those controllers. Intel has also terminated its Optane controller business.
Kaminario	United States	No	No	Yes	Yes	No
Kingston Technology	United States	No	Yes, through stake in Kioxia	Yes	No	Yes, through stake in Kioxia
Kioxia	Japan	No	Yes, but through Flash Forward, a joint venture between Sandisk and itself.	Yes	No	Yes
Lenovo	China	No	No	Yes	No	No
Lexar	United States and China	No	No	Yes	No	No
Lite-On	Taiwan	No	No	Formerly, now a brand of Kioxia	No	No
LSI Corporation	United States	No	No	LSI sold its Nytro SSD business to Seagate	No	Formerly through its subsidiary SandForce, but it sold SandForce to Seagate
Micro Center	United States	No	No	Yes, but uses its Inland house brand instead of the Micro Center brand	No	No
Micron Technology	United States	No	Yes	Yes	No	Yes
Microsemi	United States	No	No	Yes	No	No
Micro-Star International	Taiwan			Yes		
Mushkin	United States	No	No	Yes	No	No
Netac Technology	China	No	No	Yes	Yes	No
Netlist	United States	No	No	Yes	No	No
Nimbus Data	United States	No	No	Yes	No	No
OCZ	United States	No	No	A brand of Kioxia that has been shut down.	No	A brand of Kioxia that has been shut down.
Optiarc	United States	No	No	Yes	No	No
Other World Computing (OWC)	United States	No	No	Yes	No	No
Patriot Memory	United States	No	No	Yes	No	No
PioData	United States	No	No	Yes	No	No
PNY Technologies	United States	No	No	Yes	No	No
Ritek (a.k.a. RiData)	Taiwan	No	No	Yes	No	No
Samsung Electronics	South Korea	Formerly, but sold that business to Seagate	Yes	Yes	No	Yes
Sandisk	United States	No	Yes, but through Flash Forward, a joint venture between itself and Kioxia	Yes	No	Yes
Seagate Technology	United States and Ireland	Yes	Yes, through stake in Kioxia	Yes	No	Yes, through its subsidiary SandForce and stake in Kioxia
Silicon Power	Taiwan	No	No	Yes	No	No
SK hynix	South Korea	No	Yes	Yes	No	Yes (since 2012)
STEC	United States	No	No	Yes	No	No
Strontium Technology	Singapore	No	No	Yes	No	No
TDK	Japan	No	No	Yes	No	No
Texas Memory Systems	United States	No	No	Yes	Yes	No
Toshiba	Japan	Yes	Spun off its stake in Flash Forward, a joint venture then between Western Digital and itself, to Kioxia.	Spun off into Kioxia	No	Spun off into Kioxia
Transcend Information	Taiwan	No	No	Yes	No	No
Verbatim	United States	No	No	Yes	No	No
Violin Memory	United States	No	No	Yes	Yes	No
Virtium Solid State Storage and Memory	United States	No	No	Yes	No	No
Western Digital	United States	Yes	Spun off its stake in Flash Forward, a joint venture then between itself and Kioxia, into Sandisk	Formerly. Sandisk now uses the Western Digital name under license for SSDs that Sandisk acquired from WD.	No	Spun off into Sandisk
Wilk Elektronik	Poland	No	No	Yes	No	No
Zhitai	China	No	Yes through its parent YMTC	Yes	No	No
ZOTAC	Hong Kong	No	No	Formerly	No	No

== See also ==
- History of hard disk drives
- List of computer hardware manufacturers
- List of defunct hard disk manufacturers
- List of DRAM manufacturers
- List of semiconductor companies by country
