= I-RAM =

RAM disk as storage device

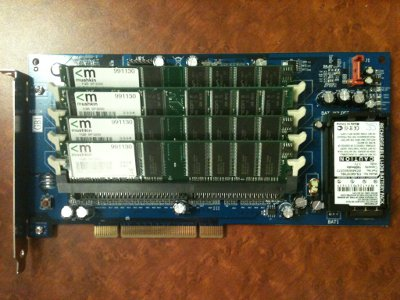
i-RAM Version 1.3 PCI-Card with 4 x 1 GB DIMM

The i-RAM was a PCI card-mounted, battery-backed RAM disk that behaved and was marketed as a solid-state storage device. It was produced by Gigabyte and released in June 2005, at a time when genuine solid-state storage solutions were generally still less affordable than an i-RAM product with superficially similar capabilities. The i-RAM utilised DRAM, a type of volatile memory, and was equipped with a lithium-ion battery to provide backup power. This backup power was necessary only when the host computer was either unplugged or completely powered down. Under normal conditions, the i-RAM could draw sufficient power from the PCI bus for RAM refresh, as the PCI bus maintains standby power even when an ATX system is shut down. However, the preservation of the DRAM's contents was limited to a duration of 10 to 16 hours, depending on the configuration, after the power supply was completely interrupted.

== Features ==
The i-RAM device had four DDR RAM DIMM slots, and used a SATA connection, causing a computer to be able to see the i-RAM as a storage device. The SATA interface limited available bandwidth to a maximum sustained throughput of 150 MB/s, but allowed a latency of 0.1ms.

The i-RAM was faster than the Hard disk drives generally used at the time of its release. The i-RAM used DDR1 memory, which had the advantage of higher speed than hard drives.

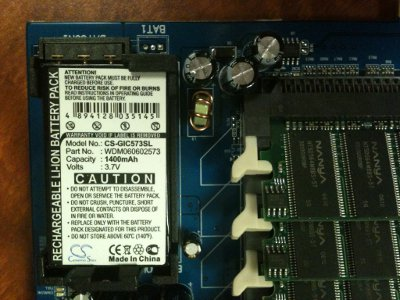
i-RAM Version 1.3 Backup Battery

The i-RAM supported Unbuffered/Non-ECC DDR 200/266/333/400 MHz RAM modules of different capacities (up to 1 GiB), speeds, and brands for a maximum capacity of 4 GiB. Because of this, cost per GB was high, but the device offered a non-mechanical storage method with higher performance than a traditional hard drive.

=== Second Generation i-RAM ===
The second-generation i-RAM, GC-RAMDISK, was on display at Computex 2006. Rather than using a PCI slot for powering the drive, Gigabyte had implemented the GC-RAMDISK as a 5.25" drive unit powered from a 4-pin Molex connector. The drive supported four DDR2 memory modules of up to 2 GiB for a total capacity of up to 8 GiB and the interface supported SATA 3.0 Gbit/s, which doubled the transfer rate compared to the earlier i-RAM.

Although this version of the I-RAM was displayed at Computex Taipei 2006, during the final revision it lost DDR2 and the higher capacity support. The released GC-RAMDISK still only supported up to DDR-400 with a total storage capacity of 4 GiB.

== i-RAM BOX ==
The i-RAM BOX became available in August 2007. It was essentially a full-width, half-height drive bay implementation of the PCI revision 1.3 product. i-RAM Box's main difference laid in its half-height 5.25" drive bay format that connected to a SATA port instead of the PCI bus. It used a standard 24-pin ATX (motherboard) power cable for standby current (Y cable supplied) and a standard 4-pin Molex power connector. It had a fan header on the PCB and a slightly more spacious PCB layout.

Otherwise, it appeared to be identical to the PCI version. It is unknown why this version based on the old PCI design was released rather than the second-generation model shown in 2006. Design changes would have been minimal due to the programmable Xilinx Spartan chipset. Most pundits had expected changes to support 2 GiB RAM modules (possibly DDR2) and most importantly SATA 3 Gbit/s.

== See also ==
- RAM drive
- Quiet PC
- Solid-state drive
- Hyperdrive (storage)
