= Hyperdrive =

Hyperdrive may refer to

- Hyperdrive, a hypothetical method of faster-than-light space travel using hyperspace
- Hyperdrive (Star Wars), a means of space travel in the Star Wars universe
- Hyperdrive (British TV series), a 2006–2007 British television science fiction sitcom that was broadcast on BBC
- Hyperdrive (American TV series), a 2019 American reality television series released on Netflix
- Hyperdrive (Transformers), a Decepticon Micromaster in the Transformers toy line
- Hyperdrive (video game), a racing video game made by Midway Games
- "Hyperdrive", a song by Devin Townsend from the Ziltoid the Omniscient album.
- Hyper Drive (Yu-Gi-Oh! 5D's), the English opening theme song to Yu-Gi-Oh! 5D's
- Hyper drive (floppy), an alternative name for 5.25-inch 80-track diskette drives with 1.2 MB storage capacity
- HyperOs HyperDrive, a series of RAM-based solid-state drives
