= Microcosm Ltd =

Microcosm Ltd is a UK company established in 1979. Its early claims to fame included Silicon Disk System in 1981 and Microcache (the world's first disk cache for microcomputers) in 1982.

Since 1989, it has concentrated on computer security, firstly with CopyControl (a software-based copy protection system), then Dinkey Dongle (small hardware copy protection keys that connect to parallel or USB ports). In 2005, it produced CopyMinder (software-based copy protection that uses the Internet where possible to provide an 'intelligent' copy protection system). More recently, it has expanded its security products by producing SmartSign, a multi-factor authentication system that supports using mobile devices to control access to web pages.

== History ==
- 1979 – Microcosm Limited was established in London (UK)
- 1981 – Silicon Disk System (the world's first RAM disk for microcomputers) released
- 1982 – Microcache (the world's first disk cache for microcomputers) released
- 1989 – CopyControl floppy disk protection released
- 1989 – Microcosm moved to Bristol (UK)
- 1994 – CopyControl UnLock-It software based protection released
- 1995 – Microcosm receives Ziff-Davis Europe award (finalist, best UK product) for CopyControl 1.65
- 1995 – Parallel port Dinkey Dongle released
- 2000 – USB port Dinkey Dongle released
- 2004 – CopyMinder internet-based software protection released
- 2008 – The world's first driverless combined Flash Drive and software protection dongle released
- 2014 – SmartSign released, providing multi-factor authentication
