= Silicon Disk System =

Article in Practical Computing magazine from 1982 reviewing Silicon Disk System and MicroCache.

The Silicon Disk System was the first commercially available RAM disk for microcomputers.

It was written by Jerry Karlin in 1979/80. Karlin was joined by Peter Cheesewright, and their company Microcosm Research Ltd. marketed the product for a number of years. The product was available as a standalone and also bundled with a number of different microcomputers and RAM-board products. Later, the Silicon Disk System was sold by Microcosm Ltd. Initially, it was available for the CP/M operating system. Versions for the MP/M, CP/M-86, and MP/M-86 operating systems followed. Following the launch of the IBM PC, a version for the MS-DOS and PC DOS operating systems was produced.
