= Backward compatibility =

Technological ability to interact with older technologies

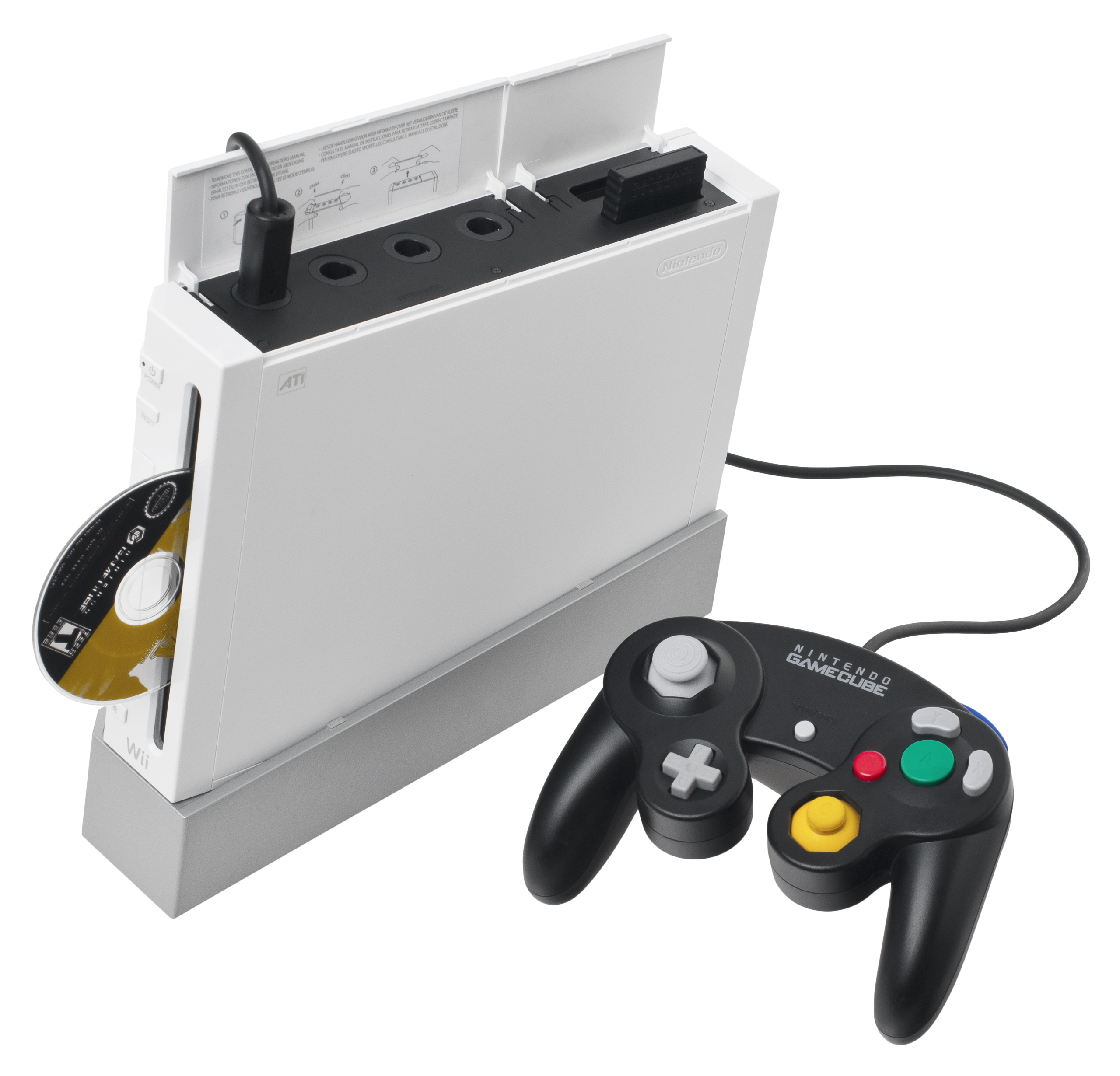
The original Wii model with the GameCube controller, memory card and game disc, showing backward compatibility with its predecessor

In telecommunications and computing, backward compatibility (or backwards compatibility) is a property of an operating system, software, real-world product, or technology that allows for interoperability with an older legacy system, or with input designed for such a system.

Modifying a system in a way that does not allow backward compatibility is sometimes called "breaking" backward compatibility. Such breaking usually incurs various types of costs, such as switching cost.

A complementary concept is forward compatibility; a design that is forward-compatible usually has a roadmap for compatibility with future standards and products.

== Usage ==
=== In hardware ===
A simple example of both backward and forward compatibility is the introduction of FM radio in stereo. FM radio was initially mono, with only one audio channel represented by one signal. With the introduction of two-channel stereo FM radio, many listeners had only mono FM receivers. Forward compatibility for mono receivers with stereo signals was achieved by sending the sum of both left and right audio channels in one signal and the difference in another signal. That allows mono FM receivers to receive and decode the sum signal while ignoring the difference signal, which is necessary only for separating the audio channels. Stereo FM receivers can receive a mono signal and decode it without the need for a second signal, and they can separate a sum signal to left and right channels if both sum and difference signals are received. Without the requirement for backward compatibility, a simpler method could have been chosen.

Full backward compatibility is particularly important in computer instruction set architectures, two of the most successful being the IBM 360/370/390/Zseries families of mainframes, and the Intel x86 family of microprocessors.

IBM announced the first 360 models in 1964 and has continued to update the series ever since, with migration over the decades from 32-bit register/24-bit addresses to 64-bit registers and addresses.

Intel announced the first Intel 8086/8088 processors in 1978, again with migrations over the decades from 16-bit to 64-bit. (The 8086/8088, in turn, were designed with easy machine-translatability of programs written for its predecessor in mind, although they were not instruction-set compatible with the 8-bit Intel 8080 processor of 1974. The Zilog Z80, however, was fully backward compatible with the Intel 8080.)

Fully backward compatible processors can process the same binary executable software instructions as their predecessors, allowing the use of a newer processor without having to acquire new applications or operating systems. Similarly, the success of the Wi-Fi digital communication standard is attributed to its broad forward and backward compatibility; it became more popular than other standards that were not backward compatible.

=== In software ===
In software development, backward compatibility is a general notion of interoperation between software pieces that will not produce any errors when its functionality is invoked via API. The software is considered stable when its API that is used to invoke functions is stable across different versions.

In operating systems, upgrades to newer versions are said to be backward compatible if executables and other files from the previous versions will work as usual.

In compilers, backward compatibility may refer to the ability of a compiler for a newer version of the language to accept source code of programs or data that worked under the previous version.

A data format is said to be backward compatible when a newer version of the program can open it without errors just like its predecessor.

== Tradeoffs ==
=== Benefits ===
There are several incentives for a company to implement backward compatibility. One is that it can be used to preserve older software that would have otherwise been lost when a manufacturer decides to stop supporting older hardware. Video games are the most notable examples of this, as it is most commonly discussed when discussing the value of supporting older software. The cultural impact of video games is a large part of their continued success, and some believe ignoring backward compatibility would cause these titles to disappear. Backward compatibility can also act as a selling point for newly-introduced hardware, as the existing user install base for the preceding hardware can more affordably upgrade to subsequent generations of a console. This can also help make up for the lack of titles at the launch of new systems, as users can pull from the previous console's library of games while developers transition to the new hardware. For example, the PlayStation 2's backward compatibility with the original PlayStation (PS) software discs and peripherals is considered to have been one of the key selling points for the console during its early months on the market. Moreover, studies in the mid-1990s found that even consumers who never play older games after purchasing a new system consider backward compatibility a highly desirable feature, valuing the mere ability to continue to play an existing collection of games even if they never choose to do so.

Despite not being included at launch, Microsoft slowly incorporated backward compatibility for select titles on the Xbox One several years into its product life cycle. Players have racked up over a billion hours with backward-compatible games on Xbox. A large part of the success and implementation of this feature is that the hardware within newer generation consoles is both powerful and similar enough to legacy systems that older titles can be broken down and re-configured to run on the Xbox One. This program has proven incredibly popular with Xbox players and goes against the recent trend of studio-made remasters of classic titles, creating what some believe to be an important shift in console makers' strategies. The current generation of consoles such as the PlayStation 5 (PS5), Xbox Series X/S, and Nintendo Switch 2 also support this feature as well.

=== Costs ===
The monetary costs of supporting old software is considered to be a large drawback to the usage of backward compatibility. The associated costs of backward compatibility are a larger bill of materials if hardware is required to support the legacy systems; increased complexity of the product that may lead to longer time to market, technological hindrances, and slowing innovation; and increased expectations from users in terms of compatibility. For video games, this also creates the risk that developers will favor developing games that are compatible with both the old and new systems, since this gives them a larger base of potential buyers, resulting in a dearth of software which uses the advanced features of the new system. Because of this, several console manufacturers phased out backward compatibility towards the end of the console generation in order to reduce cost and briefly reinvigorate sales before the arrival of newer hardware. One such example of this approach was the PlayStation 3 (PS3), where it initially featured backward compatibility with PlayStation 2 (PS2) games via the inclusion of the onboard Emotion Engine and Graphics Synthesizer hardware chips on earlier revisions but were later removed on later systems to reduce hardware costs and improve console sales, effectively eliminating PS2 backward compatibility from the console. Likewise, most models of the Wii had backward compatibility with the GameCube, however this was stripped out on later models released in 2011 onwards, also to reduce costs.

Despite this, it is still possible to bypass some of these hardware costs. For instance, earlier PS2 systems had the core of the original PlayStation (PS1) CPU integrated into the I/O processor for dual-purpose use; it could act as either the main CPU in PS1 mode or it can up-clock itself to offload I/O in PS2 mode. The original I/O core was replaced with a PowerPC-based core in later systems to serve the same functions, emulating the same functions as the PS1 CPU core. Such an approach can backfire, however, as was the case of the Super Nintendo Entertainment System (SNES), which opted for the more peculiar 65C816 CPU over the more popular 16-bit microprocessors on the basis that it would allow for easier backwards compatibility with the original Nintendo Entertainment System (NES) due to the 65C816's software compatibility with the 6502 CPU in emulation mode, but ultimately proved to be unworkable once the rest of the SNES's architecture was designed.

== See also ==
- Bug compatibility, backward compatibility that maintains known flaws
- Compatibility mode
- Computer compatibility
- Deprecation
- Downgrade attack
- Emulator
- Flag day (computing)
- Forward compatibility
- Legacy mode
- List of backward-compatible games for Xbox One and Series X/S
- List of Xbox games compatible with Xbox 360
- ReactOS
- Shim (computing)
- Software regression
- Vendor lock-in
