= ATP Electronics =

Manufacturer of NAND based storage DRAM modules

- Industry: Storage devices; Computer storage
- Founded: 1991; 35 years ago
- Headquarters: Taipei, Taiwan; San Jose, California, Japan, Germany, China
- Area served: Worldwide
- Products: Flash memory cards; Solid-state drive; Dynamic random-access memory; USB flash drives
- Number of employees: 173
- Website: www.atpinc.com

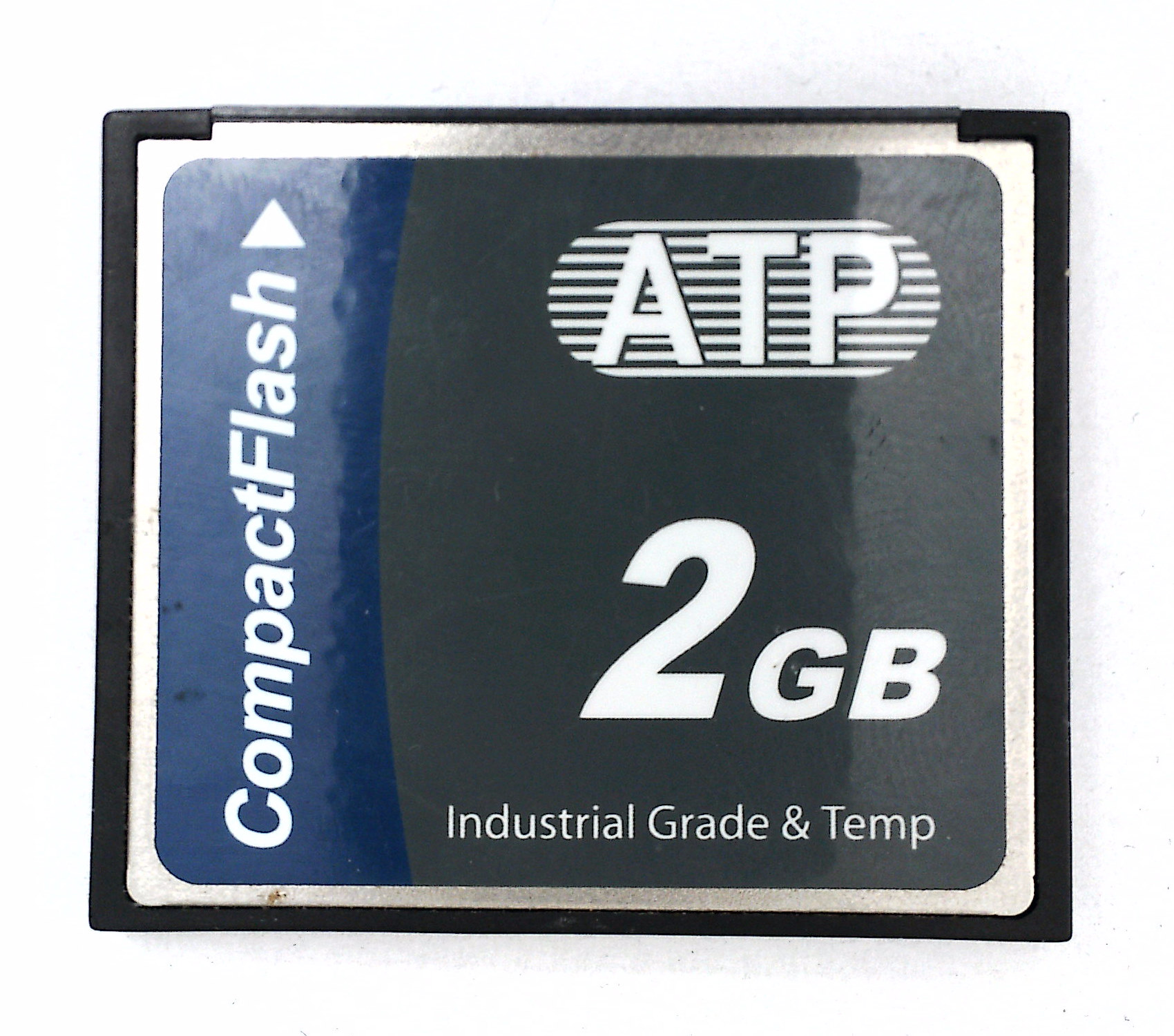
ATP Electronics 2 GB CompactFlash card

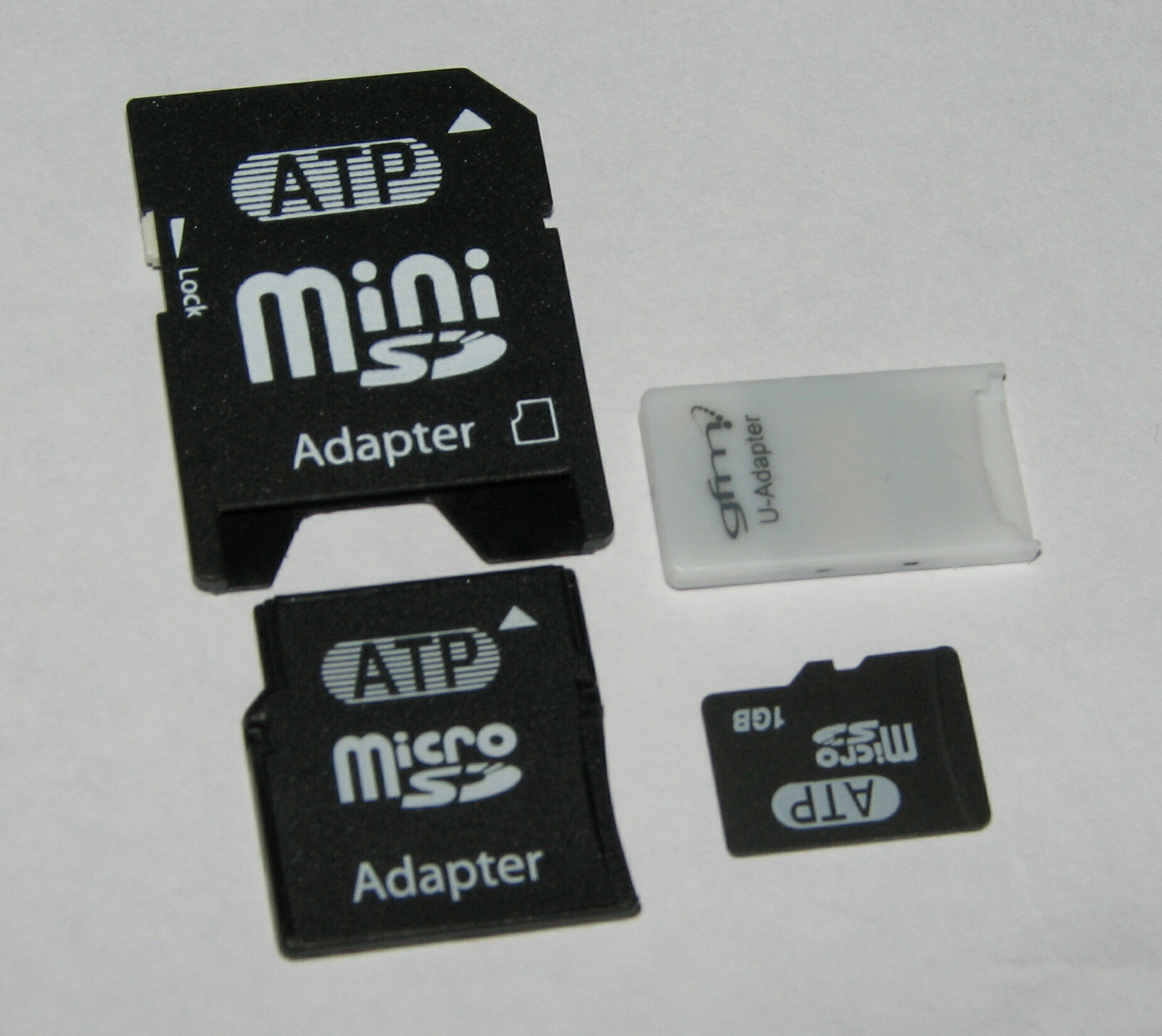
ATP Electronics 1 GB microSD card and miniSD and SD card adapters

ATP Electronics was a manufacturer of NAND based storage DRAM modules founded in Silicon Valley in 1991, headquarter was later moved to Taipei, Taiwan. ATP's product line consist of Industrial grade products, such as SSD, SD / microSD memory cards, along with DRAM products that are used in business industries across Networking, Enterprise Mobility, Automotive industry, Military, IPC/Embedded Systems, Health care, Gaming and The Internet of Things (IoT). Intel's CMTL ( Computer memory test lab ), one of the largest third party testing lab for Intel server platforms, only recommended two memory modules companies to purchase motherboards in Taiwan, one noted to be ATP Electronics.

== History ==
=== 2000-2010 ===
- In 2003, ATP was the first company to introduce 1 GB MultiMediaCard (MMC) to the mass-market.
- In 2007, ATP introduced The GPS PhotoFinder, a device to automate adding location data on JPEG image file convenient for Geotagging. The geotagging device was unique for its time and received news media coverage from the founder of Yahoo Tech David Pogue, while he was at The New York Times, further media coverage from NBC News, CNBC at CES 2008. The product also won The Taiwan Excellence Award, dated as the world's smallest GPS data logger for geotagging.
- Also in 2007, ATP partners with Susan G. Komen for the Cure and launch a campaign to support cancer cure, a percentage of the sales from Petito USB drives were donated to organization, education and cancer treatment projects worldwide.
- In 2008, partnered with American Forests, the EarthDrive USB was made from Polylactic acid and was debuted as the World's first bio-recyclable USB flash drive.
- In 2009, ATP partnered with Sesame Street to introduce Sesame Street Video USB drive for children, the collaboration product was also introduced as a fundraising program, proceeds were utilized for before and after school care programs of elementary school sites in the Santa Clara District.
- In 2010, ATP designed an SLC NAND-based SSD that can directly plug into the USB header of a motherboard.

=== 2011-Present ===
Starting 2011, ATP gradually shifted its business strategy towards the manufacture of industrial OEM suited memory products. Technology and manufacturing techniques were engineered and integrated into ATP's memory product lines for NAND Flash and Dram embedded modules to assure that Data integrity, longevity, endurance and Data security were met for its adapted business applications and hosting environment.

== Products ==
ATP Electronics manufactures two main memory product type :

- DRAM Modules including: SDRAM, DDR, DDR2, DDR3, DDR3, DDR4
- Flash products including: SSD, Compact Flash, SD/SDHC/SDXC, microSD/ microSDHC

== Partnership ==
ATP Electronics had strategic partnership with Samsung, Toshiba and Micron Technology. In 2015, ATP Electronics partners with Micron to continue support of legacy DRAM modules. From the collaboration, ATP will support Micon's DRAM modules (SDR/DDR) and its associated services to customer base that cannot be migrated from their current hosting platforms.

== Association ==
To develop and design compliant memory solution standards for associated industries applications, ATP Electronics is the board of directors for SD Association. In addition, leading member of Serial ATA International Organization, as well as members of JEDEC, Intel IoT Solutions Alliance and CompactFlash Association

== Offices ==
Founded in the United States, ATP Electronics is now headquartered in Taipei, Taiwan, with branch offices operational in India, USA, Germany, China and Japan. Manufacturing, testing and validation facility is also stationed in Taiwan, Kaohsiung.

== See also ==
- List of companies of Taiwan
- List of solid-state drive manufacturers
