= Legacy mode =

Concept in computing

In computing, legacy mode is a state in which a computer system, component, or application software behaves in a way that is different from its standard operation in order to support older software, data, or expected behavior. It differs from backward compatibility in that an item in legacy mode will often sacrifice newer features or performance, or be unable to access data or run programs it normally could, in order to provide continued access to older data or functionality. Sometimes it can allow newer technologies that replaced the old to emulate them when running older operating systems.

== Examples ==
- x86-64 processors can be run in one of two states:
  - Long mode: provides larger physical address spaces and the ability to run 64-bit applications which can use larger virtual address spaces and more registers.
  - Legacy mode: allows these processors to act as if they were 16- or 32-bit x86 processors with all of the abilities and limitations of them in order to run legacy 16-bit and 32-bit operating systems, and to run programs requiring virtual 8086 mode to run (e.g., in Windows).
- 32-bit x86 processors have two legacy modes: real mode and virtual 8086 mode. Real mode causes the processor to mostly act as if it was an original 8086, while virtual 8086 mode allows the creation of a virtual machine, enabling programs that require real mode to run within a protected mode environment. Protected mode is the non-legacy mode of 32-bit x86 processors, introduced with the Intel 80286.
- Most PC graphic cards have a VGA and a SVGA mode that allows their use on systems without their dedicated device drivers, which means they can function in basic mode even when the system hasn't fully recognized the card's advanced capabilities.
- Operating systems often have a special mode allowing them to emulate an older release in order to support software applications dependent on the specific interfaces and behavior of that release. Windows XP can be configured to emulate Windows 2000 and Windows 98. Windows 11 can run programs in "compatibility mode" for Windows 8, Windows 7, Windows Vista (Service Pack 2), Windows Vista (Service Pack 1), Windows Vista, Mac OS X used to support the execution of Mac OS 9 applications on PowerPC-based Macintoshes.
- Computer buses emulated through legacy mode:
  - Emulated bus (Host bus)
  - ISA (LPC)
  - PCI (PCI Express)
  - PS/2 or RS-232 mouse (USB mouse)
  - PS/2 or AT keyboard (USB keyboard)
  - Many SATA disk controllers offer a legacy mode of operation for compatibility i.e. parallel ATA emulation
- The Wii U can be run in a special "Wii Mode" that activates an emulated version of the Wii Menu as a means of playing games made for the latter system (it is not compatible with GameCube games without system modification, however).

== See also ==
- Backward compatibility
- Compatibility mode
- Dongle
- Legacy system
