= Virtium =

Privately held American semiconductor company

Virtium Solid State Storage and Memory
- Type: Privately owned
- Industry: Technology
- Founded: 1997; 29 years ago
- Headquarters: Rancho Santa Margarita, California
- Key people: Phu Hoang, CEO; Chinh Nguyen, CTO Thomas Magee, CFO
- Products: Flash storage and DRAM memory modules
- Number of employees: between 51 and 200
- Website: www.virtium.com

Virtium Solid State Storage and Memory (formerly known as Virtium Technology) is a privately held American company that manufactures semiconductor memory and solid-state disk (SSD) products for data storage in industrial/machine-to-machine designs, embedded systems, including small-footprint designs, and Industrial Internet of Things (IIoT) applications. The company's primary markets of focus include defense, industrial systems, network communications, and transportation.

== Description ==
Virtium was co-founded in 1997 by Phu Hoang, a refugee from Vietnam, and Chinh Nguyen. Hoang lived on a boat before immigrating to North America and learned English in a refugee camp. Since co-founding Virtium, Hoang has been acknowledged for his entrepreneurship and innovation.

Headquartered in Rancho Santa Margarita, California, USA, and with operations elsewhere in North America, Europe and Asia, Virtium designs, builds and supports its products in the United States. Virtium's primary products are memory modules and solid-state drives that use flash storage and are designed primarily with the SATA and PCI Express interfaces.

Virtium was among the first to apply proprietary programming sequences that “bridge” between single-level-cell (SLC) and multi-level-cell (MLC) types of flash memory used in SSDs, thus drawing on the reliability of the former and the cost efficiencies of the latter. In 2016, Virtium introduced self-encrypting SSDs—the first family of industrial-grade SSDs with Advanced Encryption Standard (AES-256) self-encryption available across all major drive form factors and designed for data security and data integrity. Those self-encrypting SSDs placed first in the Board, Modules & Embedded Systems category of the ECN magazine 2017 Impact Awards. Also in 2016, Virtium became one of the first industry vendors to market eUSB 3.0 storage modules in the ultra-small, 10-pin form factor. Later the same year, Virtium doubled the top capacity of its very-low-profile (VLP) RDIMM and Mini-RDIMM DDR4 memory modules to 64GB—at the time the highest capacity for industrial-embedded memory modules. In early 2021, Virtium introduced three 32GB ultra-low-profile (ULP) DDR4 modules that represent the industry's first of that capacity in Mini-UDIMM, Mini-RDIMM and SO-UDIMM form factors, as well as the industry's first 64GB ULP RDIMM module.

In September 2017, Virtium debuted its StorFly M.2 NVMe SSDs that supported industrial temperatures, or I-Temp (−40 °C to +85 °C), and drew an industry-low 3 W of power. In 2019, the company expanded its StorFly family of SSDs to include industrial 3D NAND-based drives, followed by the StorFly-XR (XR is an initialism for "Extra Rugged") line of highly ruggedized SSDs using 3D NAND flash and XR-DIMM memory modules designed for military and aerospace applications. Virtium expanded the StorFly family further in 2019 with the addition of a four-terabyte SSD with industrial-temperature support and integrated data protection. In February 2020, the company brought to market its free StorKit SSD software suite for SSD qualification, migration from SLC and MLC to higher-density flash, and monitoring and maintenance of drives deployed locally or remotely. Also in 2020, Virtium announced an expansion to the StorFly SSD family through the addition of higher-capacity 2.5-inch SATA, M.2 SATA and M.2 NVMe drives with I-Temp support. To address the increasing role of industrial-grade storage in edge computing, Virtium collaborated with SolidRun later in 2020 to prequalify select Virtium SSDs, memory and SSD software for SolidRun computer-on-module and network computing platforms targeted at 5G communications systems. In early 2021, Virtium further expanded its SSD family with the Series 6 line of NVMe, I-Temp-supported drives focused on data-intensive workloads which was among Electronic Design magazine's Embedded Products and Solutions of the Week. Storage-industry journalist and author Tom Coughlin illustrated the need for durable solid-state storage for industrial-embedded applications in a 2021 Forbes article, which featured Virtium, its SSDs and the drives' applications. In May 2021, Virtium debuted the StorFly CFexpress PCIe Gen 4 Removable NVMe SSDs, the industry's first solid-state drives to incorporate NVMe, the PCI Express 4.0 interface and I-Temp in the highly compact CFexpress form factor.

In August 2015, Virtium secured investment from L Squared Capital Partners and added David Bradford and Tim Leyden to its board of directors. Court Square Capital Partners acquired L Squared Capital's investment in Virtium in May 2019.

== Products and specialization ==
Virtium specializes in memory modules, advanced components, flash-based solid-state drives (for local and remote storage), and supporting software. Those product lines were expanded in 2015 with multiple additions to the company's industrial-embedded systems category.

The company's memory and storage products employ a variety of form factors and interfaces, including DIMM memory modules for DDR3L, MiniDIMM and ECC SoDIMM memory modules for DDR3L, and M.2, mSATA, CFast, Slim SATA, CompactFlash, PCI Express Mini Card, and eUSB SLC SSDs.
