= Patriot Memory =

American storage device company

Patriot Memory, Inc.
- Company type: Private LLC
- Industry: Storage devices
- Founded: 1985; 41 years ago as PDP Systems Inc
- Founders: Paul Jones, Douglas Diggs and Phil Young
- Headquarters: 47027 Benicia Street, Fremont, California (ZIP Code 94538), United States
- Area served: Worldwide
- Key people: Paul Jones (CEO); Douglas Diggs (President/Chairman); Phil Young (CFO/COO)
- Products: Memory cards USB flash drives Memory modules Solid-state drives PC Gaming peripherals
- Website: www.patriotmemory.com

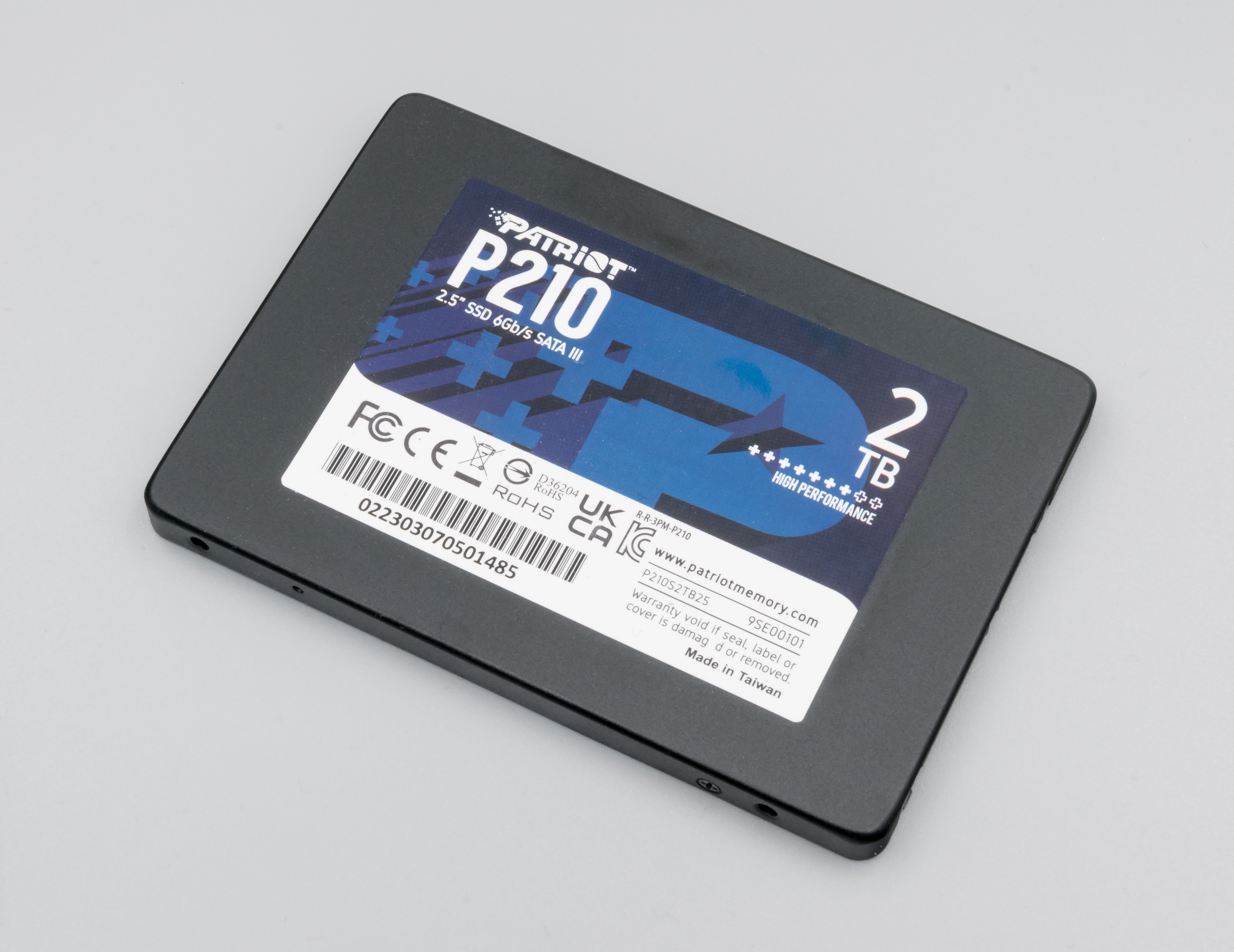
A 2.5-inch Serial ATA solid-state drive (Patriot P210 2TB)

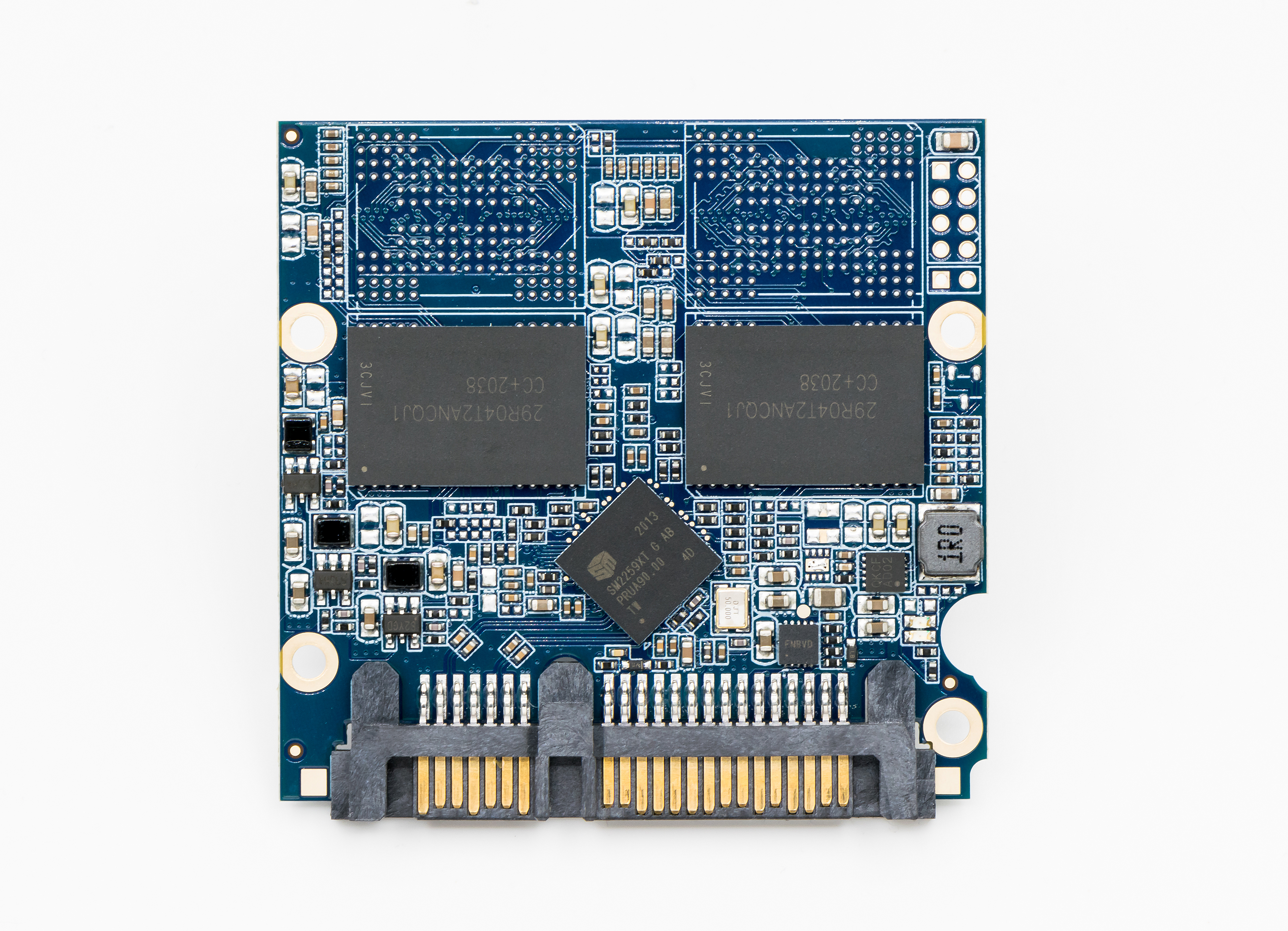
Inside of a 2.5-inch Serial ATA solid-state drive with its sticker removed to show the NAND and NAND controller (Patriot P210 2TB)

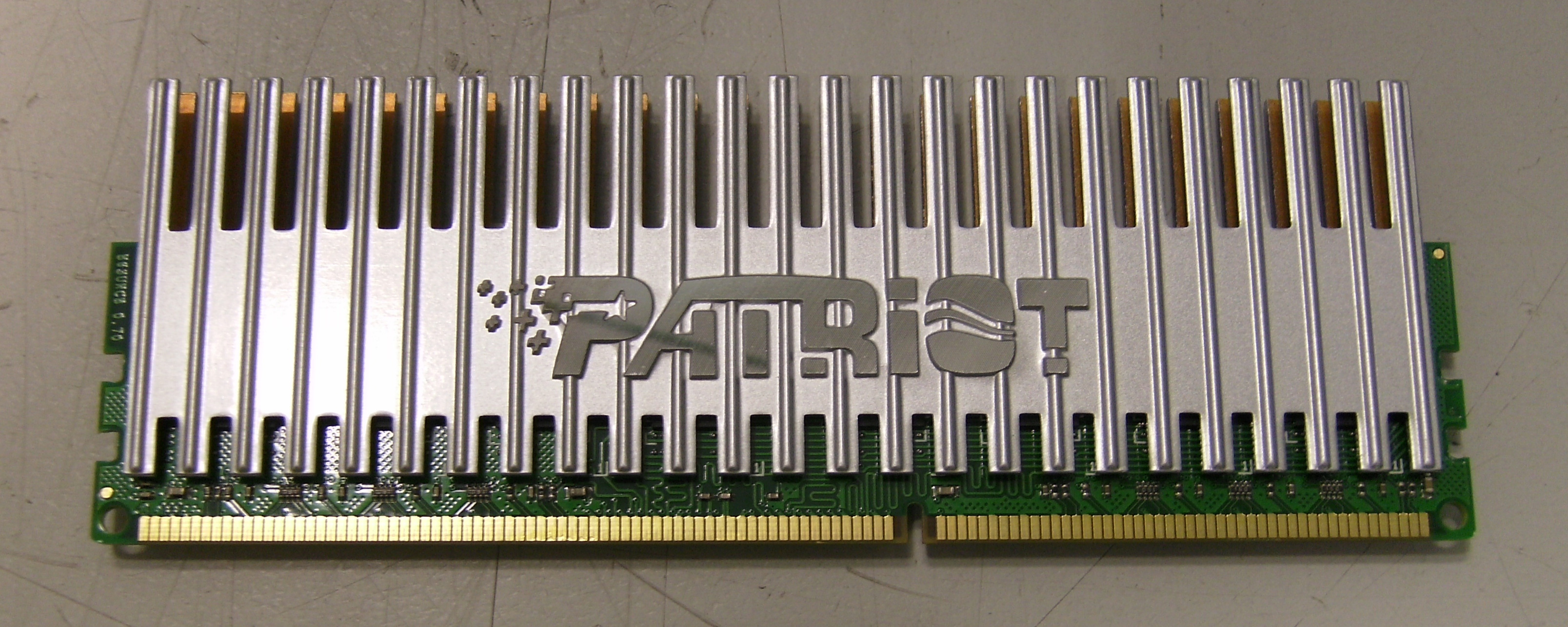
Patriot DDR3 DIMM with heatspreader

Patriot Memory is an American designer and manufacturer of PC-based USB flash drives, memory sticks, solid-state drives and gaming peripherals. Patriot Memory is based in Silicon Valley and designs, develops, manufactures and assembles computer components locally.

== History ==
PDP Systems was founded in 1985 and named after its founders Paul Jones, Doug Diggs and Phil Young. Jones, Diggs, and Young were high school classmates at Awalt High School in Mountain View, CA. Jones and Young went on to UC Davis, while Diggs graduated from the University of California at Los Angeles. PDP Systems started during Jones's time as a student at UC Davis as an OEM builder of computer memory chips into DRAM modules for many of the major PC manufacturers.

Starting in 2003 PDP Systems released their own branded Patriot Memory line of DDR SDRAM to be sold in the retail and online market. Unlike the SDRAM manufacturers that released their SDRAM as bare modules, the Patriot Memory modules featured a bladed metal heat shielding across the entire DDR module. Patriot Memory continued the use of full module heat sinks across each generation of DDR generations to include DDR4.

The Patriot Memory brand eventually became the company name. Patriot Memory has two assembly lines at their facilities in Fremont, California, and Taipei, Taiwan. Jones credits keeping manufacturing in the US as a result of having highly automated machines and reduced shipping costs. Patriot continues to evolve their "VIPER" brand of memory modules, accessories (keyboards, mice, headsets, headset stands, mousepads, and USB flash drives), and "BURST" solid state drives.
