= Dataram =

Computer memory and software manufacturer based in Princeton, New Jersey, US

Coordinates: 40.31960°N 74.63371°W

- Type: Private
- Traded as: Nasdaq: DRAM
- Industry: Technology
- Founded: 1967; 59 years ago in Princeton, New Jersey, United States
- Headquarters: Princeton, New Jersey, United States
- Area served: Worldwide
- Key people: David Moylan (president & CEO); Anthony Lougee (CFO)
- Products: Computer data storage; DRAMs; Software; Storage optimization products
- Revenue: ▲US$ 30.399 million (2014)
- Number of employees: 55 (2014)
- Website: www.dataram.com

Dataram (formerly Dataram Corporation, stylized as DATARAM) is a manufacturer of computer memory and software products headquartered in Princeton, New Jersey. Dataram Memory was founded in 1967. It provided the core memory for many early Digital Equipment computer systems. Dataram products include memory, storage and services for desktops, laptops, workstations, and servers. The company sells worldwide to OEMs, distributors, value-added resellers, embedded manufacturers, enterprise customers, and end users. Dataram provides compatible server memory for companies including HP, IBM, Sun Microsystems, Oracle, Dell, Cisco, Lenovo, Intel, and AMD. The company's manufacturing facility is in Montgomeryville, Pennsylvania, United States. Sales offices are located in the United States, Europe, China, and Japan.

== History ==
Dataram was founded in 1967 as a manufacturer of computer memory for Digital Equipment Corporation (DEC), selling 16 KB of core memory.

In 1968, Dataram completed its initial public offering and began trading on the American Stock Exchange under the ticker symbol DTM.

In 1974, the company developed memory for the Digital PDP-11.

In 1976, the company produced the first solid-state drive called the BULK CORE for DEC and Data General computers.

In 1987, Dataram produced core memory for Sun Microsystems and Apollo workstations.

In 1989, it produced core memory for HP/Apollo systems.

In 1999, the company moved from the American Stock Exchange to NASDAQ, trading under the symbol DRAM. They earned the highest number of Intel Advanced Memory Module Qualifications that year.

In 2001, the company acquired Memory Card Technology assets and again earned the highest number of Intel Advanced Memory Module Qualifications for the year.

In 2002, the company's DDR memory modules for the Intel market received validation from Advanced Validation Labs.

In 2008, the company signed a service and support agreement with IBM. On 9 October 2018, Cenatek Inc. acquired a privately owned company located in Morgan Hill, California, whose products were based on high-speed storage, such as the Rocket Drive PCI-based solid-state disk and Ramdisk. The company's research and development were located in Redding, California.

In 2017, Dataram was taken private upon acquisition by LTL Group after taking part in the 2016 reverse IPO of the U.S. Gold Corp.

Dataram Interface Module for a Digital Equipment PDP-8/I

== Awards ==
In September 2011, Dataram was listed in the Top 100 Companies by The Star-Ledger.
