= HyperOs HyperDrive =

HyperDrive (HD) is a series of RAM-based solid-state drives invented by Accelerated Logic B.V. (became Accelerated Logic Ltd. and is now a German company) employee Pascal Bancsi (for HyperDrive II architecture), who partnered with the British company HyperOs Systems, who manufactured the retail product. The HyperDrive interfaces with and is recognized by computer systems as a standard hard drive.

The HyperOs HyperDrive is a series of solid-state drives that use high-speed DDR RAM for data storage.

== HyperDrive I ==
Originally called 'Accelerator', development began in 1999. It is an IDE device supporting PIO mode 1 transfer, and includes 128 MiB SRAM.

== HyperDrive II ==
After the SRAM Accelerator, it was switched to SDRAM and used a 5.25-inch form factor, which allowed the company to build an accelerator with a capacity of 128 MiB to 4 GiB. It had a maximum random access time of 0.15 ms. SDRAM was chosen over Flash because of its speed advantage and reliability over flash memory.

Later generations used a 3.5-inch form factor and supported UDMA 33 transfer speed, with a maximum capacity of 14 GiB.It used an Atmel controller. and included a battery backup mechanism. Future plans included support of UDMA66, a Fibre Channel interface.

== HyperDrive III ==
The Hyperdrive III uses a Parallel ATA (PATA) (max 100 MB/s) or Serial ATA (SATA) interface. For the first time, memory capacity could be changed by using memory slots. It uses ECC DDR SDRAM (max 2 GiB per DIMM). Maximum capacity started at 6 DIMM (12 GiB), and was later changed to 8 DIMM (16 GiB).

Non-volatile storage is achieved using an integral 160-minute 7.2 V battery backup battery (1250 mAh), external adapter, or HyperOs software.

It uses the Xilinx Spartan FPGA and Atmel controller array.

The circuit board was produced by DCE.

== HyperDrive 4 ==
It supports both SATA and PATA interfaces (PATA native), with interface speeds up to 133 MB/s. It uses ECC DDR SDRAM (max 2 GiB per DIMM).

Maximum capacity is 8 DIMM (16 GiB, PC1600-PC3200). Memory of different sizes can be mixed, but only if DIMMs of the same capacity are used in 1 bank (4 DIMM/bank).

It supports non-volatile memory backup using an optional 2.5-inch PATA drive, HyperOs software (which swaps RAM contents to a different drive), or a backup battery (5 Ah or 10 Ah).

The drive is rated 125 MB/s data rate, 44k I/O per second.

=== Revision 3 ===
It supports registered ECC SDRAM, with capacity up to 2 GiB per DIMM on 16 GiB version and 4 GiB per DIMM on 32 GiB version. Seek time was reduced from 40 microseconds to 1100 nanoseconds read and 250 nanoseconds write. It also reduces the power consumption by 30% and employs gold plated DIMM sockets.

=== HyperDrive 4 Rack-mounted ===
It is a rack-mounted version of the device with at most four drives.

=== HyperDrive 4 RAID Systems ===
It is an external case version with four HyperDrive4 drives. It uses PCI-X or PCI Express x8 interface, with Silicon Image 3124 or Areca 12XX SAT RAID card to connect each drive.

== HyperDrive 5 ==
It uses SATA interface with 2x SATA2 interface ports. It uses DDR2 SDRAM (max 8 GiB per DIMM). The manufacturer claimed it had built-in ECC so it no longer required ECC memory, but ECC is performed at the expense of storage capacity if ECC memory is not used. Memory speed is not rated; the manufacturer recommends Kingston ValueRAM (PC2-3200 to PC2-6400).

HyperDrive 5 includes 7.4 V 2400 mAh lithium battery for flash backup, CompactFlash card slot, with an external DC adapter for non-volatile storage.

The drive is rated 175 MB/s read, 145 MB/s write, 40k (later 65k) I/O per second, when using only one of the SATA2 links. The rated speed using the dual SATA2 links is not given by the manufacturer. When using both SATA2 links, the physical drive can be configured as a RAID 0 array with two devices with half of maximum capacity. In RAID 0 mode, the read and write speeds are reported to be more than twice those that are claimed by the manufacturer.

Drive controller is switched to Taiwanese ASIC, instead of the Xilinx Spartan FPGA/Atmel array.

HyperDrive 5 is also sold as ACard ANS-9010, outside of the UK.

=== HyperDrive 5M ===
A cheaper version of the Hyperdrive5, with only one SATA2 port and 6 DDR2 slots, so that memory is limited to 48 GiB. Performance and features are the same as the HyperDrive5 when using only one SATA2 link.

HyperDrive 5M is sold as ACard ANS-9010B, outside of the UK.

== Awards ==
HyperDrive4 (16 GiB) won Custom PCs Crazy But Cool award.

== See also ==
- RAM drive
- Solid-state drive (SSD)
