= RAM limit =

Maximum amount of RAM accessible by a computer

The maximum random access memory (RAM) installed in any computer system is limited by hardware, software and economic factors. The hardware may have a limited number of address bus bits, limited by the processor package or design of the system. Some of the address space may be shared between RAM, peripherals, and read-only memory. In the case of a microcontroller with no external RAM, the size of the RAM array is limited by the size of the integrated circuit die. In a packaged system, only enough RAM may be provided for the system's required functions, with no provision for addition of memory after manufacture.

Software limitations to usable physical RAM may be present. An operating system may only be designed to allocate a certain amount of memory, with upper address bits reserved to indicate designations such as I/O or supervisor mode or other security information. Or the operating system may rely on internal data structures with fixed limits for addressable memory.

For mass-market personal computers, there may be no financial advantage to a manufacturer in providing more memory sockets, address lines, or other hardware than necessary to run mass-market software. When memory devices were relatively expensive compared with the processor, often the RAM delivered with the system was much less than the address capacity of the hardware, because of cost.

Sometimes RAM limits can be overcome using special techniques. Bank switching allows blocks of RAM memory to be switched into the processor's address space when required, under program control. Operating systems routinely manage running programs using virtual memory, where individual program operate as if they have access to a large memory space that is being simulated by swapping memory areas with disk storage.

== CPU addressing limits ==
Integrated circuit packages may have a limit on the number of pins available to provide the memory bus. Different versions of a CPU architecture, in different-sized IC packages, can be designed, trading off reduced package size for reduced pin count and address space. A trade-off might be made between address pins and other functions, restricting the memory physically available to an architecture even if it inherently has a higher capacity. On the other hand, segmented or bank switching designs provide more memory address space than is available in an internal memory address register.

As integrated circuit memory became less costly, it was feasible to design systems with larger and larger physical memory spaces.

=== Fewer than 16 address pins ===
Microcontroller devices with integrated I/O and memory on-chip sometimes had no, or a small, address bus available for external devices. For example, a microcontroller family available with a 2 kilobyte address space might have a variant that brought out an 11 line address bus for an external ROM; this could be done by reassigning I/O pins as address bus pins. Some general-purpose processors with integrated ROM split a 16-bit address space between internal ROM and an external 15-bit memory bus.

Some microprocessors had fewer than 16 address pins: for example, the MOS Technology 6507 (a reduced pin count version of the 6502) was used in the Atari 2600 and was limited to a 13-line address bus.

=== 16 address bits, 16 address pins ===
Most 8-bit general-purpose microprocessors have 16-bit address spaces and generate 16 address lines. Examples include the Intel 8080, Intel 8085, Zilog Z80, Motorola 6800, Microchip PIC18, and many others. These processors have 8-bit CPUs with 8-bit data and 16-bit addressing. The memory on these CPUs is addressable at the byte level. This leads to a memory addressable limit of 2^{16} × 1 byte = 65,536 bytes or 64 kilobytes.

=== 16 address bits, 20 address pins: 8086, 8088, 80186 & 80188 ===
The Intel 8086 and derivatives, such as the 8088, 80186 and 80188 form the basis of the popular x86 platform and are the first level of the IA16 architecture. These were 16-bit CPUs with 20-bit addressing. The memory on these CPUs were addressable at the byte level. These processors could address 2^{20} bytes (1 megabyte).

=== 16 bit addresses, 24 address pins: 80286 ===
The Intel 80286 CPU used a 24-bit addressing scheme. Each memory location was byte-addressable. This results in a total addressable space of 2^{24} × 1 byte = 16,777,216 bytes or 16 megabytes. The 286 and later could also function in real mode, which imposed the addressing limits of the 8086 processor. The 286 had support for virtual memory.

=== 32 bit addresses, 24 address pins ===
The Intel 80386SX was an economical version of the 386DX. It had a 24-bit addressing scheme, in contrast to 32-bit in the 386DX. Like the 286, the 386SX can address only up to 16 megabytes of memory.

The Motorola 68000 had a 24-bit address space, allowing it to access up to 16 megabytes of memory.

=== 32 bit addresses, 32 address pins ===
The 386DX had 32-bit addressing, allowing it to address up to 4 gigabytes (4096 megabytes) of memory.

The Motorola 68020, released in 1984, had a 32-bit address space, giving it a maximum addressable memory limit of 4 GB. All following chips in the Motorola 68000 series inherited this limit.

=== 32 bit addresses, 36 address pins: Pentium Pro (aka P6) ===
The Pentium Pro and all Pentium 4s have 36-bit addressing, which resulted in total addressable space of 64 gigabytes, but it requires that the operating system support Physical Address Extension.

=== 64 bit computing ===
Modern 64-bit processors such as designs from ARM, Intel or AMD are typically limited to supporting fewer than 64 bits for RAM addresses. They commonly implement from 40 to 52 physical address bits (supporting from 1 TB to 4 PB of RAM). Like previous architectures described here, some of these are designed to support higher limits of RAM addressing as technology improves. In both Intel64 and AMD64, the 52-bit physical address limit is defined in the architecture specifications (4 PB).

== Operating system RAM limits ==
=== CP/M and 8080 addressing limit ===
The first major operating system for microcomputers was CP/M. This operating system was compatible with Altair 8800-like microcomputers, made by Gary Kildall in conjunction with the programming language PL/M, and was licensed to computer manufacturers by Kildall's company Digital Research after it was rejected by Intel. The Intel 8080 used by these computers was an 8-bit processor, with 16-bit address space, which allowed it access up to 64 KB of memory; .COM executables used with CP/M have a maximum size of 64 KB due to this, as do those used by DOS operating systems for 16-bit microprocessors.

=== IBM PC and 8088 addressing limit ===
In the original IBM PC, the basic RAM limit is 640 KB. This is to allow for hardware addressing space in the upper 384 KB (upper memory area (UMA)) of the total addressable memory space of 1024 KB (1 MB). Ways to overcome the 640k barrier, as it came to be known, involved using special addressing modes available in the 286 and later x86 processors. The 1 MB total address space was a result of the 20-bit address space limit imposed on the 8088 CPU.

Using the color video buffer space, some third-party utilities could add memory at the top of the 640k conventional memory area, to extend memory up to the base address used by hardware adapters. This could ultimately backfill RAM up to the MDA base address.

Hardware extensions allowed access to more memory than the 8086 CPU could address through paging memory. This memory was known as expanded memory. An industry de facto standard was developed by the LIM consortium, composed of Lotus, Intel and Microsoft. This standard was the Expanded Memory Specification (EMS). Pages of memory from expanded memory hardware were accessible through an addressing window placed into a free area in the UMA space, and by exchanging it for other pages when needed to access other memory. EMS supported 16 MB of space.

Using a quirk in the 286 CPU architecture, the high memory area (HMA) was accessible, as the first 64 KB above the 1 MB limit of 20-bit addressing in the x86 architecture.

Using the 24-bit memory addressing capabilities of the 286 CPU architecture, a total address space of 16 MB was accessible. Memory above the 1 MB limit was called extended memory. However the area between 640 KB and 1 MB was reserved for hardware addressing in IBM PC compatibles. DOS and other real mode programs, limited to 20-bit addresses, could only access this space through EMS emulation on the extended memory, or an EMS analog for extended memory. Microsoft developed a standard known as the Extended Memory Specification (XMS). Accessing the memory above the HMA required usage of the protected mode of the 286 CPU.

With the development of the i386 CPU architecture, the address space was moved to 32-bit addressing, and a limit of 4 GB. With this CPU, access to 16 MB memory areas was available to DOS programs that used DOS extenders, such as DOS/4GW, MiniGW/16, MiniGW, and others. Initially a de facto industry memory standard for interaction known as VCPI was developed. Later, a Microsoft standard supplanted this, known as the DPMI. These standards allowed direct access to the 16 MB space, instead of the paging scheme used by EMS and XMS.

=== 16-bit OS/2 RAM limit ===
16-bit OS/2 was limited to 15 MB, due to reserve space designed into the operating system. It reserved the top 1 MB of the 16 MB 24-bit address space for non-memory (from 16 MB to 15 MB).

=== 32-bit x86 RAM limit ===
In non-PAE modes of 32-bit x86 processors, the usable RAM may be limited to less than 4 GB. Limits on memory and address space vary by platform and operating system. Limits on physical memory for 32-bit platforms also depend on the presence and use of Physical Address Extension (PAE), which allows 32-bit systems to use more than 4 GB of physical memory.

PAE and 64-bit systems may be able to address up to the full address space of the x86 processor.

== See also ==
- DOS memory management
- Motherboard
