= RAM drive =

RAM used to emulate secondary storage

A RAM drive (also called a RAM disk) is a block of random-access memory (primary storage or volatile memory) that a computer's software treats as if the memory were a hard disk drive or solid-state drive (secondary storage). RAM drives provide high-performance temporary storage for demanding tasks and protect non-volatile storage devices from wearing down, since RAM is not prone to wear from writing, unlike non-volatile flash memory as used in solid-state drives.

It is sometimes referred to as a virtual RAM drive or software RAM drive to distinguish it from a hardware RAM drive that uses separate hardware containing RAM, which is a type of battery-backed solid-state drive.

RAM drives were originally conceived to bridge the performance gap between primary memory and secondary storage devices. With the advent of solid-state drives this advantage was reduced. However, solid-state drives suffer from wear from frequent writing. RAM does not suffer this damage or does so far less, so RAM devices still offer an advantage to store frequently changing data, like temporary or cached information.

== Performance ==
The performance of a RAM drive is generally orders of magnitude faster than other forms of digital storage, such as SSD, tape, optical, hard disk, and floppy drives. This performance gain is due to multiple factors, including access time, maximum throughput, and file system characteristics.

File access time is greatly reduced since a RAM drive is solid state (no moving parts). A physical hard drive, optical (e.g, CD-ROM, DVD, and Blu-ray) or other media (e.g. magnetic bubble, acoustic storage, magnetic tape) must move the information to a particular position before reading or writing can occur. RAM drives can access data with only the address, eliminating this latency.

Second, the maximum throughput of a RAM drive is limited by the speed of the RAM, the data bus, and the CPU of the computer. Other forms of storage media are further limited by the speed of the storage bus, such as IDE (PATA), SATA, USB or FireWire. Compounding this limitation is the speed of the actual mechanics of the drive motors, heads, or eyes.

Third, the file system in use, such as NTFS, HFS+, UFS, ext2, etc., uses extra accesses, reads and writes to the drive, which although small, can add up quickly, especially in the event of many small files vs. few larger files (temporary internet folders, web caches, etc.).

Because the storage is in RAM, it is volatile memory, which means it will be lost in the event of power loss, whether intentional (computer reboot or shutdown) or accidental (power failure or system crash). This is, in general, a weakness (the data must periodically be backed up to a persistent-storage medium to avoid loss), but is sometimes desirable: for example, when working with a decrypted copy of an encrypted file, or using the RAM drive to store the system's temporary files.

In many cases, the data stored on the RAM drive is created from data permanently stored elsewhere, for faster access, and is re-created on the RAM drive when the system reboots.

Apart from the risk of data loss, the major limitation of RAM drives is capacity, which is constrained by the amount of installed RAM. Multi-terabyte SSD storage has become common, but RAM is still measured in gigabytes.

RAM drives use normal system memory as if it were a partition on a physical hard drive rather than accessing the data bus normally used for secondary storage. Though RAM drives can often be supported directly in the operating system via special mechanisms in the OS kernel, it is generally simpler to access a RAM drive through a virtual device driver. This makes the non-disk nature of RAM drives invisible to both the OS and applications.

Usually no battery backup is needed due to the temporary nature of the information stored in the RAM drive, but an uninterruptible power supply can keep the system running during a short power outage.

Some RAM drives use a compressed file system such as cramfs to allow compressed data to be accessed on the fly, without decompressing it first. This is convenient because RAM drives are often small due to the higher price per byte than conventional hard drive storage.

== History and operating system specifics ==
The first software RAM drive for microcomputers was invented and written by Jerry Karlin in the UK in 1979/80. The software, known as the Silicon Disk System, was further developed into a commercial product and marketed by JK Systems Research which became Microcosm Research Ltd when the company was joined by Peter Cheesewright of Microcosm Ltd. The idea was to enable the early microcomputers to use more RAM than the CPU could directly address. Making bank-switched RAM behave like a disk drive was much faster than the disk drives, especially before hard drives were readily available on such machines. The Silicon Disk was launched in 1980, initially for the CP/M operating system and later for MS-DOS.

The 128kB Atari 130XE (with DOS 2.5) and Commodore 128 natively support RAM drives, as does ProDOS for the Apple II. On systems with 128kB or more of RAM, ProDOS automatically creates a RAM drive named /RAM.

IBM added a RAM drive named VDISK.SYS to PC DOS (version 3.0) in August 1984, which was the first DOS component to use extended memory. VDISK.SYS was not available in Microsoft's MS-DOS as it, unlike most components of early versions of PC DOS, was written by IBM. Microsoft included the similar program RAMDRIVE.SYS in MS-DOS 3.2 (released in 1986), which could also use expanded memory. It was discontinued in Windows 7. DR-DOS and the DR family of multi-user operating systems also came with a RAM disk named VDISK.SYS. In Multiuser DOS, the RAM disk defaults to the drive letter M: (for memory drive). AmigaOS has had a built in RAM drive since the release of version 1.1 in 1985 and still has it in AmigaOS 4.1 (2010). Apple Computer added the functionality to the Apple II series with ProDOS and, later, to Apple Macintosh with System 7's Memory control panel in 1991, and kept the feature through the life of Mac OS 9.

A RAM drive innovation introduced in 1986 but made generally available in 1987 by Perry Kivolowitz for AmigaOS was the ability of the RAM drive to survive most crashes and reboots. Called the ASDG Recoverable Ram Disk, the device survived reboots by allocating memory dynamically in the reverse order of default memory allocation (a feature supported by the underlying OS) so as to reduce memory fragmentation. A "super-block" was written with a unique signature which could be located in memory upon reboot. The super-block, and all other RRD disk "blocks" maintained check sums to enable the invalidation of the disk if corruption was detected. At first, the ASDG RRD was locked to ASDG memory boards and used as a selling feature. Later, the ASDG RRD was made available as shareware carrying a suggested donation of 10 dollars. The shareware version appeared on Fred Fish Disks 58 and 241. AmigaOS itself would gain a Recoverable Ram Disk (called "RAD") in version 1.3.

Many Unix and Unix-like systems provide some form of RAM drive functionality, such as /dev/ram on Linux, or md(4) on FreeBSD. RAM drives are particularly useful in high-performance, low-resource applications for which Unix-like operating systems are sometimes configured. There are also a few specialized "ultra-lightweight" Linux distributions which are designed to boot from removable media and stored in a ramdisk for the entire session.

=== Dedicated hardware RAM drives ===
There have been RAM drives which use DRAM memory that is exclusively dedicated to function as an extremely low latency storage device. This memory is isolated from the processor and not directly accessible in the same manner as normal system memory. Some of the first dedicated RAM drives were released in 1983-1985.

An early example of a hardware RAM drive was introduced by Assimilation Process in 1986 for the Macintosh. Called the "Excalibur", it was an external 2MB RAM drive, and retailed for between $599 and $699 US. With the RAM capacity expandable in 1MB increments, its internal battery was said to be effective for between 6 and 8 hours, and, unusual for the time, it was connected via the Macintosh floppy disk port.

In 2002, Cenatek produced the Rocket Drive, max 4 GB, which had four DIMM slots for PC133 memory, with up to a maximum of four gigabytes of storage. At the time, common desktop computers used 64 to 128 megabytes of PC100 or PC133 memory. The one gigabyte PC133 modules (the largest available at the time) cost approximately $1,300 (equivalent to $2,327 in 2025). A fully outfitted Rocket Drive with four GB of storage would have cost $5,600 (equivalent to $10,024 in 2025).

In 2005, Gigabyte Technology produced the i-RAM, max 4 GB, which functioned essentially identically to the Rocket Drive, except upgraded to use the newer DDR memory technology, though also limited to a maximum of 4 GB capacity.

For both of these devices, the dynamic RAM requires continuous power to retain data; when power is lost, the data fades away. For the Rocket Drive, there was a connector for an external power supply separate from the computer, and the option for an external battery to retain data during a power failure. The i-RAM included a small battery directly on the expansion board, for 10-16 hours of protection.

Both devices used the SATA 1.0 interface to transfer data from the dedicated RAM drive to the system. The SATA interface was a slow bottleneck that limited the maximum performance of both RAM drives, but these drives still provided exceptionally low data access latency and high sustained transfer speeds, compared to mechanical hard drives.

In 2006, Gigabyte Technology produced the GC-RAMDISK, max 8GB, which was the second generation creation for the i-RAM. It has a maximum of 8 GB capacity, twice that of the i-RAM. It used the SATA-II port, again twice that of the i-RAM. One of its best selling points is that it can be used as a boot device.

In 2007, ACard Technology produced the ANS-9010 Serial ATA RAM disk, max 64 GB. Quote from the tech report: The ANS-9010 "which has eight DDR2 DIMM slots and support for up to 8 GB of memory per slot. The ANS-9010 also features a pair of Serial ATA ports, allowing it to function as a single drive or masquerade as a pair of drives that can easily be split into an even faster RAID 0 array."

In 2009, Acard Technology produced the ACARD ANS-9010BA 5.25" Dynamic SSD SATA-II RAM Disk, max 64GB. It uses a single SATA-II port.

Both variants are equipped with one or more CompactFlash card interface located in the front panel, allowing non-volatile data being stored on the RAM drive to be copied on the CompactFlash card in case of power failure and low backup battery. Two pushbuttons located on the front panel allows the user to manually backup / restore data on the RAM drive. The CompactFlash card itself is not accessible to the user by normal means as the CF card is solely intended for RAM backup and restoration. The CF card's capacity has to meet / exceed the RAM module's total capacity in order to effectively work as a reliable backup.

In 2009, DDRdrive, LLC produced the DDRDrive X1, which claims to be the fastest solid state drive in the world. The drive is a primary 4GB DDR dedicated RAM drive for regular use, which can back up to and recall from a 4GB SLC NAND drive. The intended market is for keeping and recording log files. If there is a power loss the data can be saved to an internal 4GB ssd in 60 seconds, via the use of a battery backup. Thereafter the data can be recovered back in to RAM once power is restored. A host power loss triggers the DDRdrive X1 to back up volatile data to on-board non-volatile storage.

== See also ==
- Cache (computing), an area to store transient copies of data being written to, or repeatedly read from, a slower device
- Initial ramdisk
- List of RAM drive software
