= Thermal interface material =

Material put between components to enhance thermal coupling

A thermal interface material (TIM) is any material that is inserted between two components in order to enhance the thermal coupling between them. A common use is heat dissipation, in which the TIM is inserted between a heat-producing device (e.g. an integrated circuit) and a heat-dissipating device (e.g. a heat sink).

== Overview ==
There are intensive studies in developing several kinds of TIM with different target applications. At each interface, a thermal resistance exists and impedes heat dissipation. In addition, the electronic performance and device lifetime can degrade dramatically under continuous overheating and large thermal stress at the interfaces.

Many recent efforts have been dedicated to developing and improving TIMs: These effort include minimizing the thermal boundary resistance between layers and enhancing thermal management performance, while addressing application requirements such as low thermal stress between materials of different thermal expansion coefficients, low elastic modulus or viscosity, as well as ensuring flexibility and reusability.

- Thermal paste: Mostly used in the electronics industry, thermal pastes provide a very thin bond line and therefore a very small thermal resistance. They have no mechanical strength (other than the surface tension of the paste and the resulting adhesive effect) and require an external mechanical fixation mechanism. Because they do not cure, thermal pastes are typically only used where the material can be contained, or in thin applications where the viscosity of the paste will allow it to stay in position during use.
- Thermal adhesive: As with thermal pastes, thermal adhesives provide a very thin bond line, but provide additional mechanical strength to the bond after curing. While curing TIMs like thermal adhesives may be used outside of a semiconductor package, often they are used in inside of a thermal package, as their curing properties can improve reliability over different thermal stresses. Thermal adhesives come in both single-part formulations as well as two-part formulations, often containing additives to improve thermal conductivity, including solid fillers (metal oxides, carbon black, carbon nanotubes, etc.), or liquid metal droplets.
- Thermal gap filler, "thermal putty": This could be described as "curing thermal paste" or "non-adhesive thermal glue". It provides thicker bond lines than the thermal paste, as it cures while still allowing an easy disassembly, thanks to limited adhesiveness.
- Thermally conductive pad: As opposed to previous TIMs that come in a fluidic form, thermal pads are manufactured and used in a solid state (albeit often soft). Mostly made of silicone or silicone-like material, thermal pads have the advantage of being easy to apply. They provide thicker bond lines (ranging in thickness from larger than a few hundred μm to a few mm) to accommodate non-flat interfaces and even multi-component interfaces, but will usually need higher force to press the heat sink onto the heat source, so that the thermal pad conforms to the bonded surfaces.
- Thermal tape: These materials adhere to the bonded surfaces, require no curing time, they are easy to apply. Similar to thermal pads, they are typically shipped in a solid but flexible form and come in a variety of thicknesses larger than a few hundred μm.
- Metal thermal interface materials (metal TIMs): Metallic materials offer substantially higher bulk thermal conductivity as well as the lowest thermal interface resistance. This high conductivity translates to less sensitivity to bondline thicknesses and coplanarity issues than polymeric TIMs. Common metals used as TIMs include the relatively soft and compliant indium alloys, as well as sintered silver.

== Phase-change ==
Some TIMs claim to be "phase-change materials" (PCM). This should not be confused with the phrase's usual meaning, i.e. a material that absorbs a large amount of heat when melting. Instead, this refers to the ability of the material to soften under typical working temperatures, typically at 55–60 degrees Celsius. After being softened it becomes able to fills all gaps between the heat source and the heat sink much like regular thermal paste.

PCM may require a "burn-in" period as they soften and achieve a perfect fit. After a good fit is achieved, it can be difficult to remove the heat sink from the chip/lid surface, as the PCM can fit into microscopic imperfections on both surfaces and become solidified.

Almost all thermally conductive pads are made of PCM. Some newer thermal pastes are also made of PCM, the goal being resistance to pump-out.

Indium-alloy metal TIMs are also considered to be phase-changing, as they too soften.

== See also ==
- Heat sink
- Heat spreader
