= Excess heat =

Excess heat can refer to, or be used in the context of:

- Cold fusion#Excess heat and energy production (in the context of cold fusion)
- Computer cooling
- Earth's energy budget (in the context of climate change)
- Waste heat
