= Arctic Silver =

Privately owned engineering corporation

Arctic Silver Inc.
- Type: Private
- Industry: Computer cooling, electronics cooling
- Founded: 1999; 27 years ago
- Founder: Nevin House
- Headquarters: Visalia, California
- Products: Thermal interface materials
- Website: www.arcticsilver.com

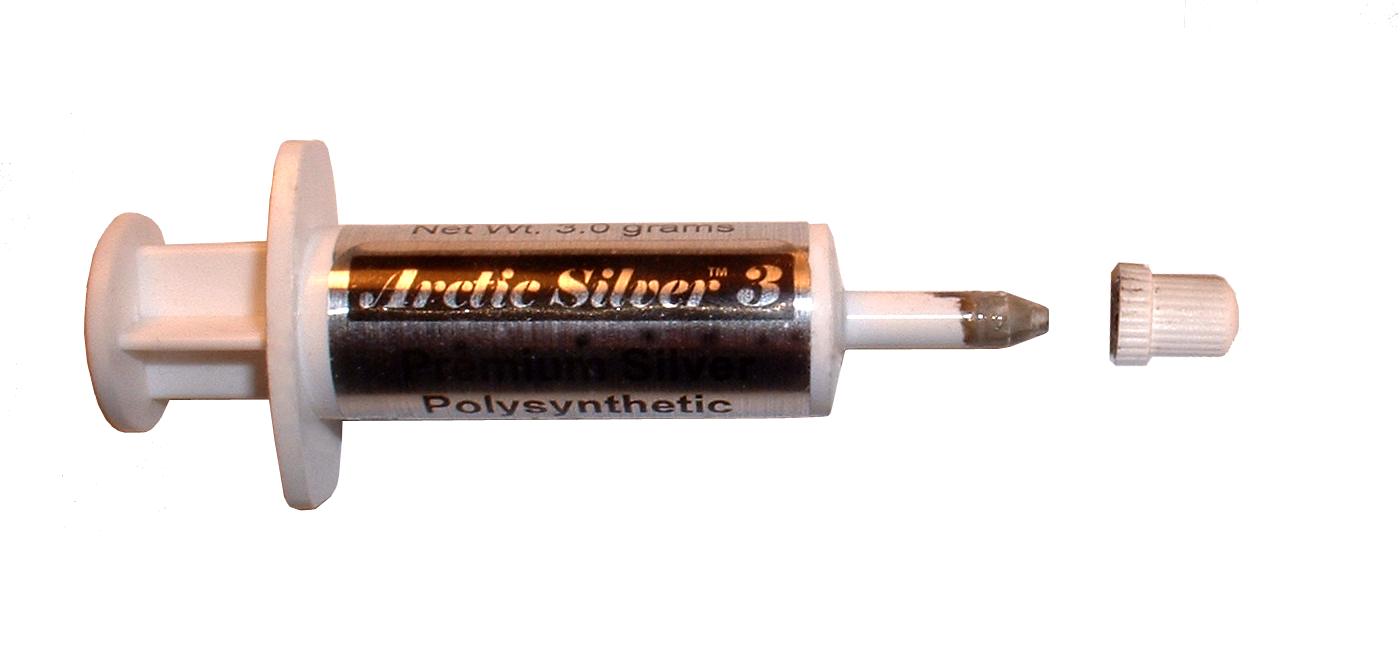
Arctic Silver 3 thermal compound, an early syringe from 2003

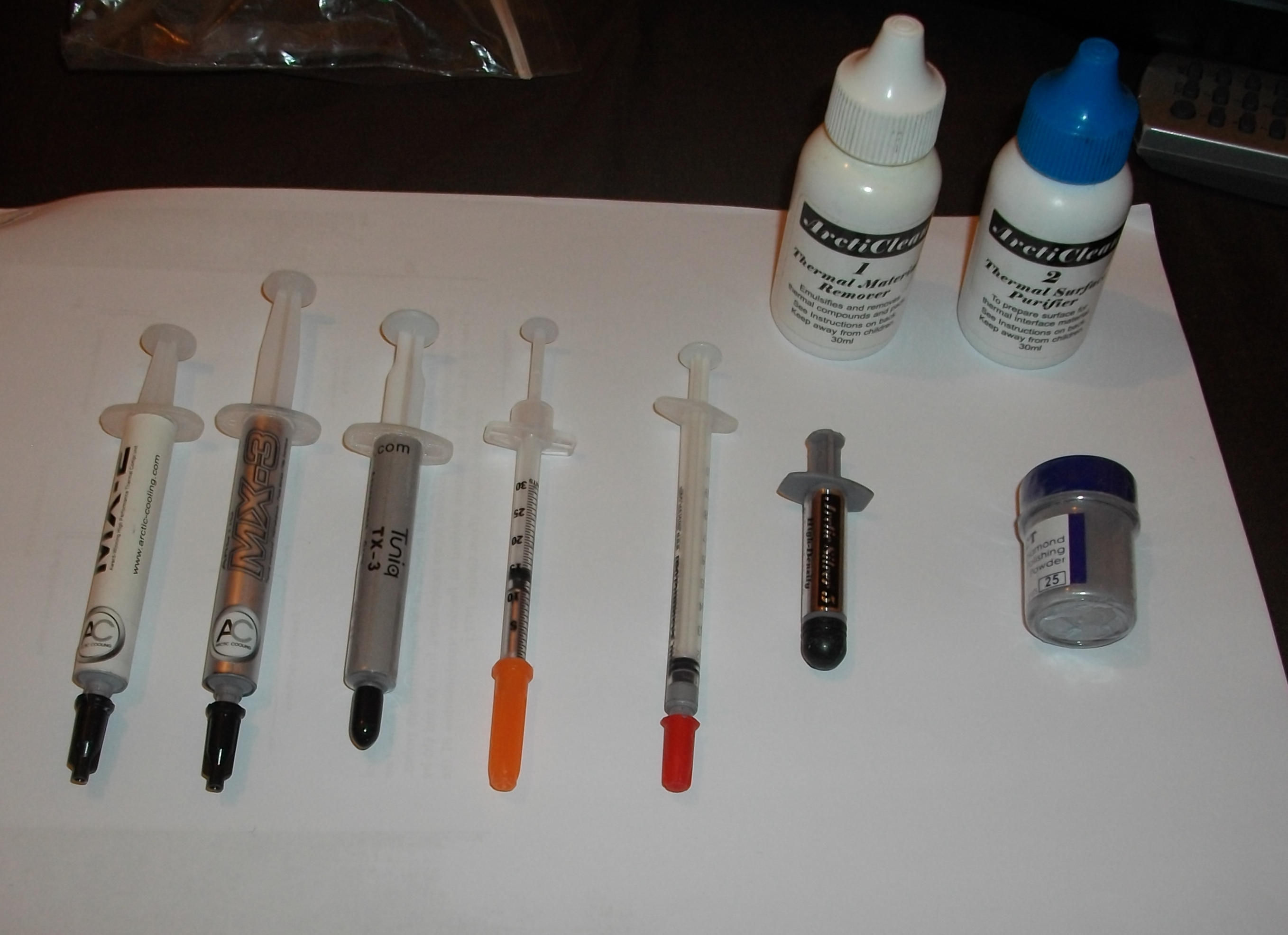
Arctic Silver 5 is 6th from left (in the custom grey and silver syringe with the fat black cap), and ArctiClean steps 1 and 2 bottles in the background.

Arctic Silver Inc. is a privately owned engineering corporation which develops and manufactures thermally conductive compounds and thermal adhesives for the application of heat sinks to high-powered electronic components such as processors, LEDs, chipsets and other electronic devices. Founded in 1999, the company's facilities are located in Visalia, California, US.

== History ==
The Arctic Silver company was founded by Nevin House in 1999. Headquartered in Visalia, California, USA, House's original product was a custom modified version of HP's Turbocooler heatsink design from servers and workstations. That experience led to research in thermal compounds, and their material composition. House experimented with silver based solutions, and success with improved formulas led to a change in business focus, to thermal interface compounds. A succession of silver formulations were its leading products in the mid-2000s, as is the current Arctic Silver 5. Other developments include ceramic (non-conductive) compounds as well as thermal interface epoxy adhesives for use where permanence is desirable, or where no other heatsink attachment method is available.

== Selected products ==
All products are RoHS compliant.

=== Arctic Silver 5 (AS-5) ===
The current version of the company's eponymous thermal interface material, Arctic Silver 5, is a compound of silver, aluminum oxide, zinc oxide, and boron nitride in a polysynthetic oil base. It does not contain any silicone.

In a 2009 BenchmarkReviews.com review which compared 80 thermal pastes, AS-5 tied for first overall, with an A+ "enthusiast grade"; it cooled a test system 12% better than the last-place finisher. (This is useful for overclocking, though it is insignificant in most scenarios.)

==== Claims and test results ====
The company claims that AS-5's thermal conductivity is 8.7 W/(m·K). However, a study led by the US National Renewable Energy Laboratory found that it was only 0.94 W/(m·K). The study lauded Shin-Etsu X-23-7762-S and Dow Corning TC-5022 for their better thermal performance.

The company also claims that its greases will never dry out or set.

=== Matrix ===
Matrix is the company's most recent thermal compound in collaboration with TIM Consultants. It consists of a silicone oil base containing aluminum, aluminum oxide, and zinc oxide particles.

The 2009 BenchmarkReviews.com 80-product review gave Matrix (Labeled TIM Consultants T-C Grease 0098) an A, "enthusiast grade"; it cooled a test system 11% better than the last-place finisher.

=== Arctic Alumina ===
Arctic Alumina is a ceramics-based polysynthetic thermal compound using aluminum oxide as a thermal transfer medium. It is a lower-cost product than Arctic Silver 5.

The 2009 BenchmarkReviews.com 80-product review rated Alumina in the Good class, with a B+ "enthusiast grade"; it cooled a test system 10% better than the last-place finisher.

=== Céramique ===
Céramique is a composite of boron nitride, aluminum oxide, and zinc oxide. All of these are ceramic substances, that is they have crystalline molecular structures. Céramique's suspension fluid is a polysynthetic oil base. It is an electrical insulator, which makes it a better choice than pastes that contain metal (such as AS-5) when there is a possibility that the thermal compound could come in contact with the pins of an integrated circuit: for example, exposed resistors on the tops of some chip packages or a tightly packed circuit board or expansion card.

The 2009 BenchmarkReviews.com 80-product review rated Céramique in the Good class, with a B+ rating; it cooled a test system 10% better than the last-place finisher.
