= Thermally conductive pad =

Thermal interface material

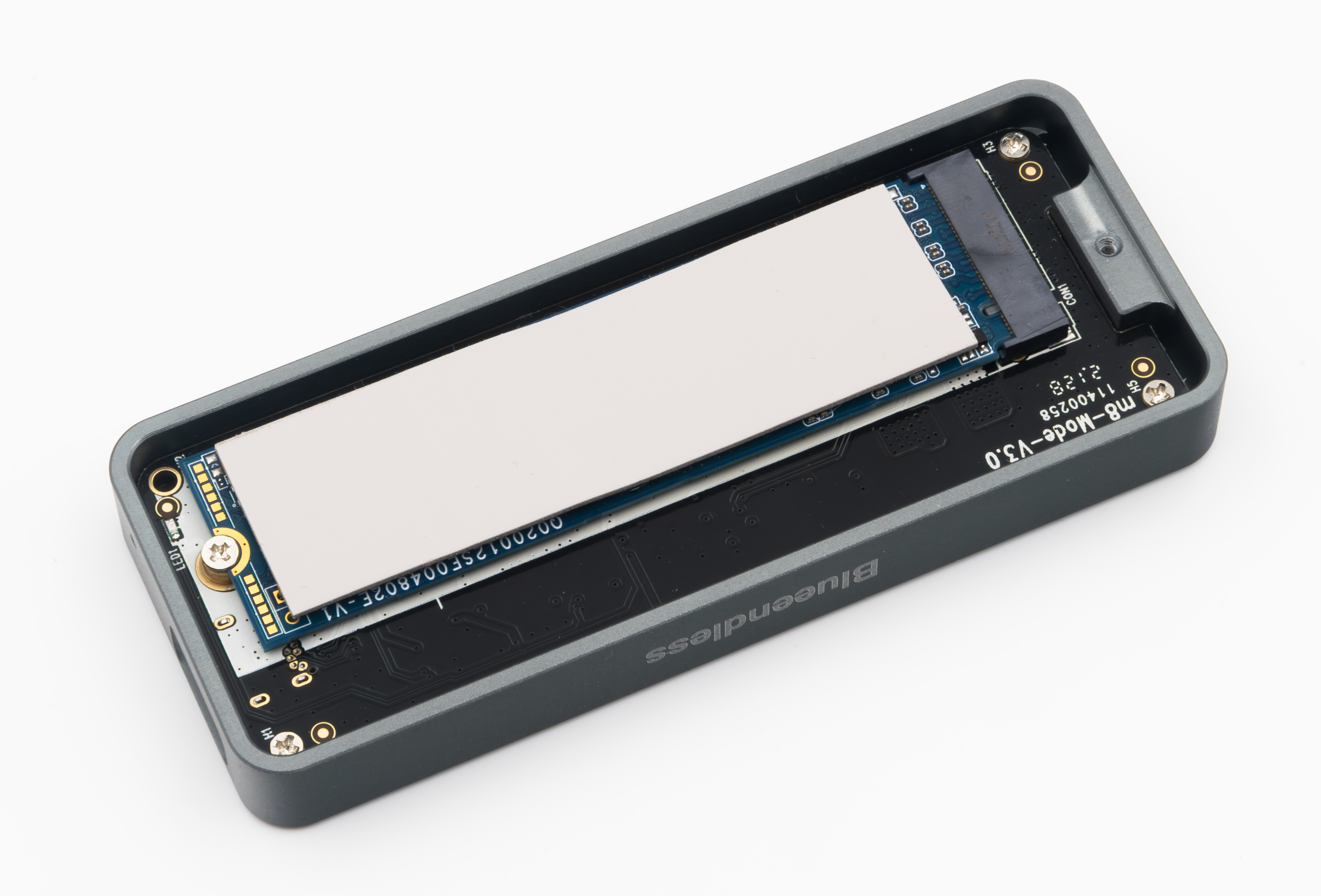
A thermal pad on an NVMe SSD

In computing and electronics, thermal pads (also called thermally conductive pad or thermal interface pad) are pre-formed rectangles of solid material (often paraffin wax or silicone based) commonly found on the underside of heatsinks to aid the conduction of heat away from the component being cooled (such as a CPU or another chip) and into the heatsink (usually made from aluminium or copper). Thermal pads and thermal compound are used to fill air gaps caused by imperfectly flat or smooth surfaces which should be in thermal contact; they would not be needed between perfectly flat and smooth surfaces. It is an alternative to thermal paste to be used as thermal interface material. AMD and Intel have included thermal pads on the bottom of heatsinks shipped with some of their processors, as they are cleaner and generally easier to install. Some, but not all, types of chip carriers include thermal pads in their design.

Thermal pads are relatively firm at room temperature, but become soft and are able to fill gaps at higher temperatures such as those generated by a working chip. This behavior is often termed a "phase change" by industrial sources, though this use must be differentiated with the regular meaning of phase-change material (a material that absorbs a lot of heat when melting).

== Comparison with thermal paste ==
Thermal pads from 2009 conduct heat less effectively than a minimal amount of contemporary thermal paste.

Thermal pads are by design more resistant to pump-out than traditional (non-phase-change) thermal paste. They may require a "burn-in" period as they soften and achieve a perfect fit. After a good fit is achieved, it can be difficult to remove the heat sink from the chip/lid surface, as the material can fit into microscopic imperfections on both surfaces and become solidified.

Like thermal paste under pressure, softened thermal pads eventually spread to cover the entire interface between the chip and the heatsink. As a result, the area of the thermal pad used need not actually cover the entire interface.

Most thermal pads are made to be electrical insulators, much like most thermal pastes are. However, metal pads that soften exist.

== See also ==
- Computer cooling
- Hot-melt adhesive
- Phase-change material
- Thermal adhesive
- Thermal paste
- List of thermal conductivities
