= Thermal paste =

Fluid used to maximize thermal contact

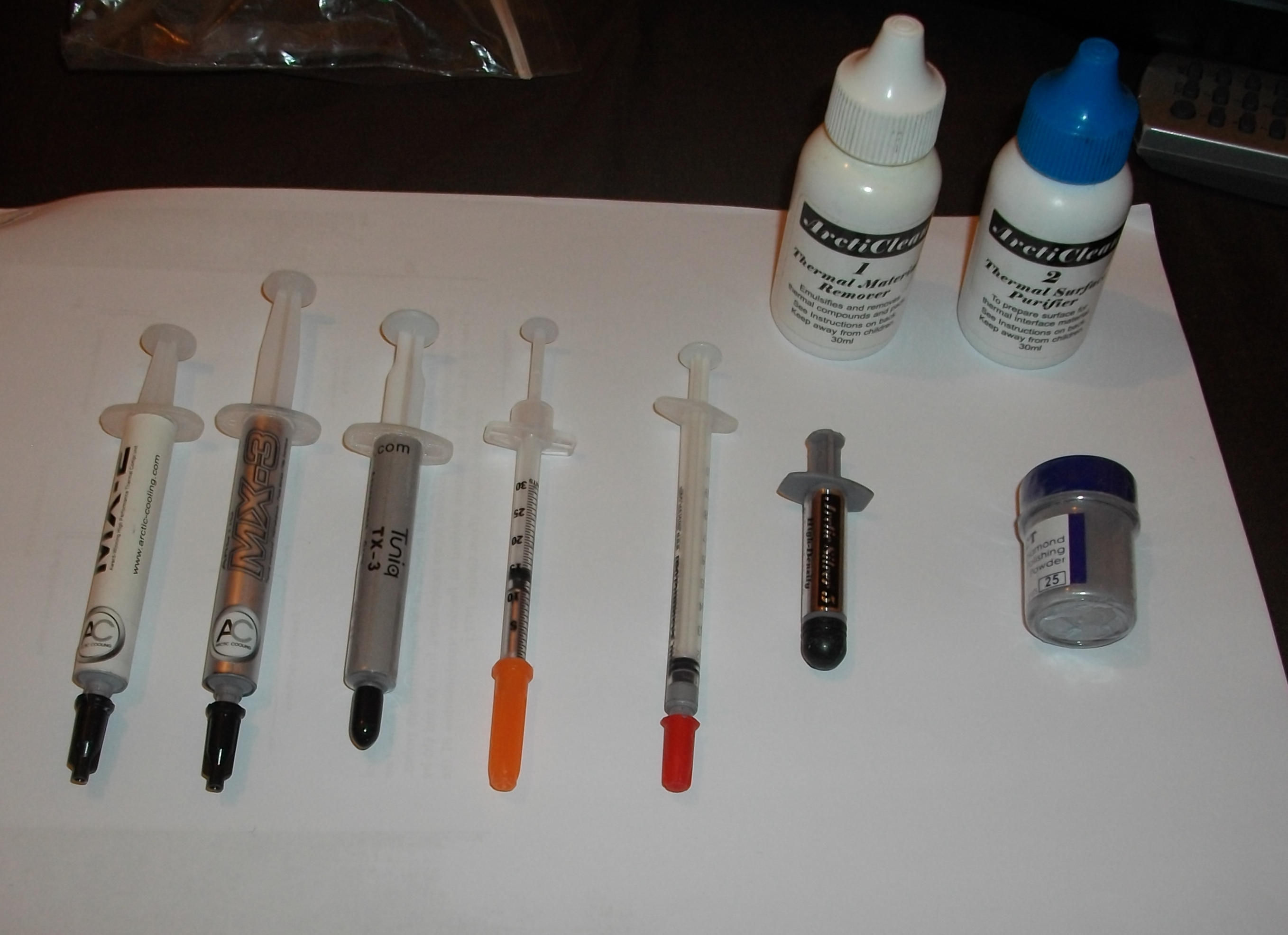
Several containers of thermal paste of different brands. From left to right: Arctic Cooling MX-2 and MX-3, Tuniq TX-3, Cool Laboratory Liquid Metal Pro, Shin-Etsu MicroSi G751, Arctic Silver 5, Powdered Diamond. In background: Arctic Silver thermal paste remover.

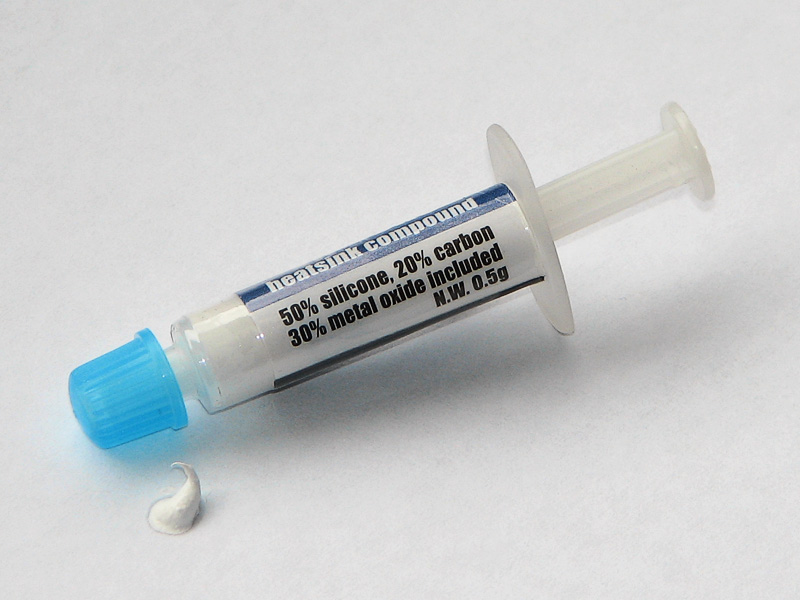
Silicone thermal compound

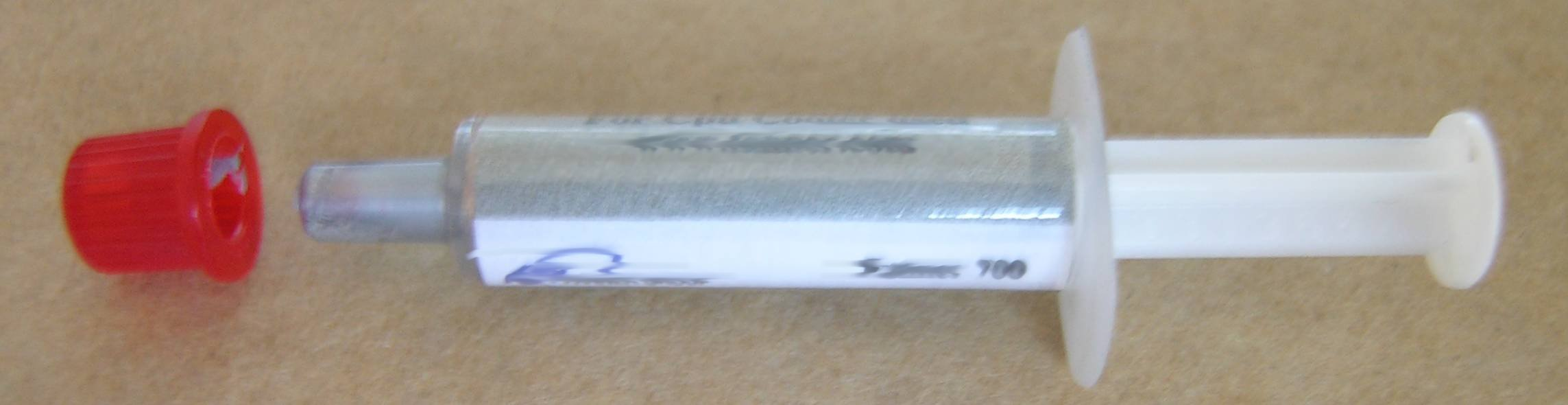
Metal (silver) thermal compound

Metal thermal paste applied to a chip

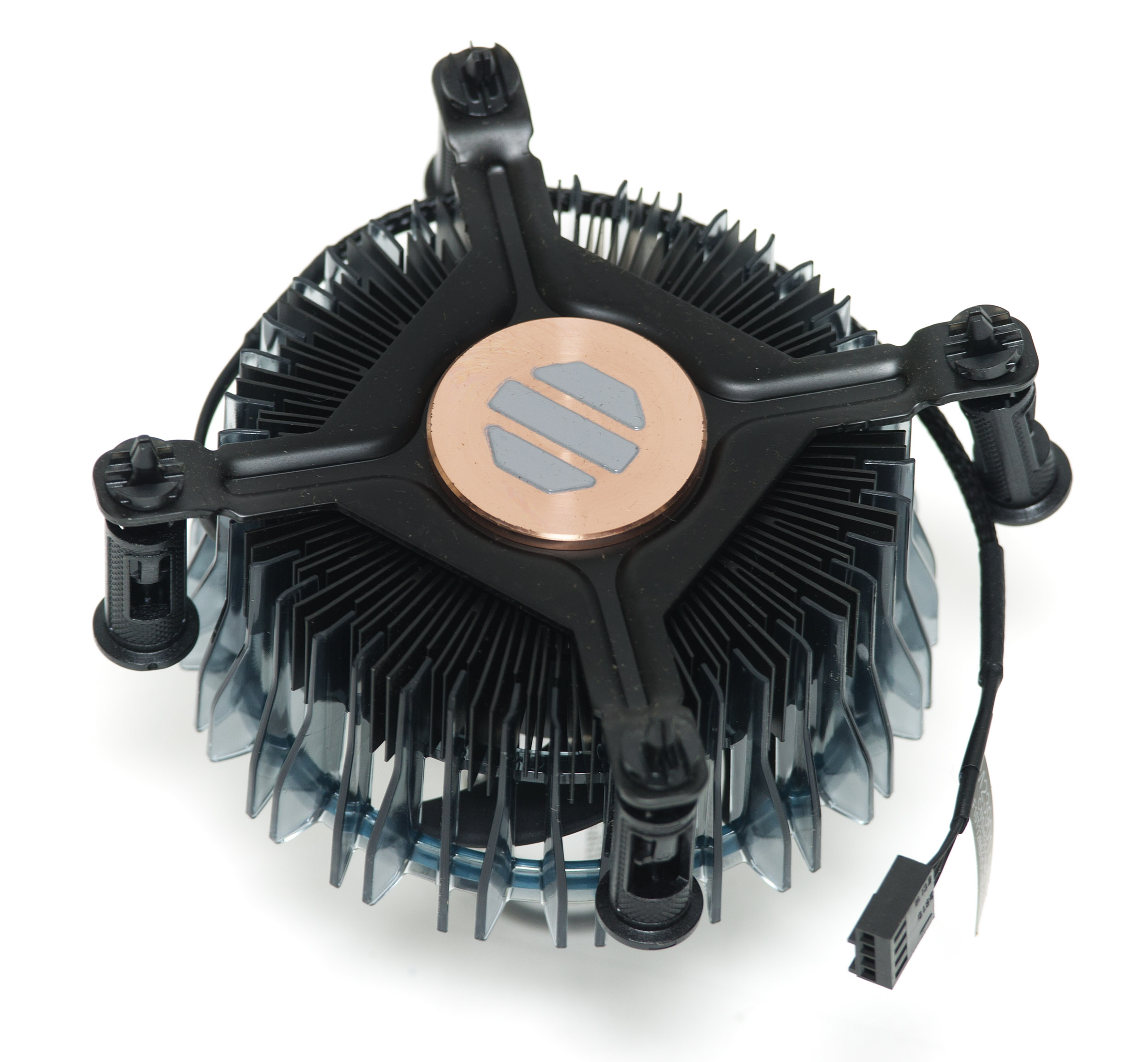
A stock Intel CPU cooler with factory-applied thermal paste

Thermal paste (also called thermal compound, thermal grease, thermal interface material (TIM), thermal gel, heat paste, heat sink compound, heat sink paste or CPU grease) is a thermally conductive (but usually not electrically conductive) chemical compound, which is commonly used as an interface between heat sinks and heat sources such as high-power semiconductor devices. The main role of thermal paste is to eliminate air gaps or spaces (which act as thermal insulation) from the interface area in order to maximize heat transfer and dissipation. Thermal paste is an example of a thermal interface material.

As opposed to thermal adhesive, thermal paste does not add mechanical strength to the bond between heat source and heat sink. It has to be coupled with a fastener such as screws to hold the heat sink in place and to apply pressure, spreading and thinning the thermal paste.

== Composition ==
Thermal paste is made from of polymerizable liquid matrix combined with an electric insulator as filler. The filler, which takes up 70 to 80% of the total mass, also conducts heat. It may raise the thermal conductivity from 0.17–0.3 W/(m·K) (watts per meter-kelvin) up to about 4 W/(m·K), according to a 2008 paper. The liquid matrix may be an acrylate, epoxy, hot-melt adhesive, pressure-sensitive adhesive tapes, silicone (silicone grease), solvent-based systems, or urethane. The filler may be made from aluminum nitride, aluminum oxide, boron nitride, diamond, or zinc oxide.

Silver thermal compounds may have a conductivity of 3 to 8 W/(m·K) or more, and consist of micronized silver particles suspended in a silicone/ceramic medium. However, metal-based thermal paste can be electrically conductive and capacitive; if some flows onto the circuits, it can lead to malfunction and damage.

The most effective (and most expensive) pastes consist almost entirely of liquid metal, usually a variation of the alloy galinstan, and have thermal conductivities in excess of 13 W/(m·K). These are difficult to apply evenly and have the greatest risk of causing malfunction due to spillage. Furthermore, these pastes contain gallium which is highly corrosive to aluminium and thus cannot be used on aluminium heat sinks.

== Uses ==
Thermal paste is used to improve the heat coupling between different components. A common application is to drain away waste heat generated by electrical resistance in semiconductor devices including power transistors, CPUs, GPUs, and LED COBs. Cooling these devices is essential because excess heat rapidly degrades their performance and can cause a runaway to catastrophic failure of the device due to the negative temperature coefficient property of semiconductors.

Factory PCs and laptops—although seldom tablets or smartphones—typically incorporate thermal paste between the top of the CPU case and a heat sink for cooling. Thermal paste is sometimes also used between the CPU die and its integrated heat spreader, though solder is sometimes used instead.

When a CPU heat spreader is coupled to the die via thermal paste, performance enthusiasts such as overclockers are able to, in a process known as "delidding", pry the heat spreader, or CPU "lid", from the die. This allows them to replace the thermal paste, which is usually of low quality, with a thermal paste having greater thermal conductivity. Generally, liquid metal thermal pastes are used in such instances.

== Challenges ==
The consistency of thermal paste makes it susceptible to failure mechanisms distinct from some other thermal interface materials. A common one is pump-out, which is the loss of thermal paste from between the die and the heat sink due to their differing rates of thermal expansion and contraction. Over a large number of hot-cold cycles (not necessarily power cycles), thermal paste extrudes from between the die and heat sink, which eventually causes degradation of thermal performance inasmuch as there is less paste in place.

Another issue with some compounds is the separation of the polymer and filler matrix components occurs under high temperatures. The loss of polymeric material can result in poor wettability, leading to increased thermal resistance.

=== Phase-change material ===
Thermal pastes that undergo phase transition at working temperatures have been made. Instead of the regular meaning of phase-change material (a material that absorbs a lot of heat when melting), "phase-change" thermal pastes simply refer to pastes that soften at the intended working temperature. (Earlier PCM thermal pastes actually did melt, but this proved bad for reliability.)

This softening allows the paste to flow back and partially undo pump-out. The result is an improved lifespan in terms of resistance to hot-cold cycles. They are originally used in thermally conductive pads to improve microscopic fit and therefore conduction. Phase-change thermal compounds require some time under heat to settle into place after applying. As it settles into place, the heat conduction (and hence cooling) improves.

== Health hazards ==
Zinc oxide, as a powder, is highly toxic to aquatic organisms and may cause long-term negative effects to aquatic environments. It is considered non-toxic for human food and skin use, but dangerous when inhaled. However, it is very unlikely for zinc oxide in thermal paste to be released back into a powder form.

== See also ==
- Computer cooling
- Hot-melt adhesive
- Phase-change material
- Thermally conductive pad
- List of thermal conductivities
