= Thermal adhesive =

Thermally conductive glue for electronics

Thermal adhesive is a type of thermally conductive glue used for electronic components and heat sinks. It can be available as a paste (similar to thermal paste) or as a double-sided tape.

It is commonly used to bond integrated circuits to heatsinks where there are no other mounting mechanisms available.

The glue is typically a two-part epoxy resin (usually for paste products) or cyanoacrylate (for tapes). The thermally conductive material can vary including metals, metal oxides, silica or ceramic microspheres. The latter are found in products that have much higher dielectric strength, although this comes at the cost of lower thermal conductivity.

End-user modding heatsinks may be supplied with thermal adhesive attached (usually a piece of tape). For products sold through electronic components distributors this is rarely the case; the adhesives are sold separately to professionals.

== See also ==
- Computer cooling
- Hot-melt adhesive
- Phase-change material
- Thermally conductive pad
- Thermal paste
- List of thermal conductivities
