= Freeze =

Freeze may refer to:

== Liquids turning to solids ==
- Freezing, the physical process of a liquid turning into a solid
- Directional freezing, freezing from only one direction or side

== Cessation of movement or change ==
- Freeze (b-boy move), dance move
- Freeze, command-line compressor program, see list of archive formats
- Freeze or Hang (computing), a condition when computer software becomes unresponsive
- Freeze (software engineering), a period of stricter rules for changing the software during its development

== People ==
=== Surname ===
- Amy Freeze (born 1974), American television meteorologist
- Daddy Freeze (contemporary), Nigerian radio host and presenter
- Dr. Freeze (contemporary), American singer, songwriter and record producer
- Frosty Freeze (1963–2008), American breakdancer
- Hugh Freeze (born 1969), American college football coach
- J. Donald Freeze (1932–2006), American theologian and educator
- Jake Freeze (1900–1983), American professional baseball pitcher
- John Gosse Freeze (1825–1913), American lawyer and writer
- Lillie T. Freeze (1855–1937), American leader within The Church of Jesus Christ of Latter-day Saints
- Samuel Freeze (1778–1844), Canadian farmer and political figure in New Brunswick

=== Characters and nicknames ===
- Freeze (gamer), Aleš Kněžínek, Czech League of Legends player
- Robert "Freeze" Riggs, Michael Alig's roommate and accomplice in murdering fellow Club Kid Angel Melendez
- Mr. Freeze, supervillain in American comic books published by DC Comics
- The Freeze, a spandex-clad sprinter who races fans at home games of the Atlanta Braves

=== Sports teams ===
- Chicago Freeze, junior ice hockey team in the North American Hockey League (1997–2003)
- Cleveland Freeze, American professional indoor soccer team (2013–2014)
- Erie Freeze, American indoor football team (2005–2007)
- Fargo Freeze, professional indoor American football team (2000)
- Flintshire Freeze, Welsh ice hockey team (1998–2012)
- Fresno Freeze FC, American soccer team in the Women's Premier Soccer League (WPSL), founded in 2014
- Minnesota Freeze, United States Australian Football League (USAFL) team, founded in 2005

== Places ==
- Freeze, Idaho, a community in Latah County, Idaho
- Freeze Out, California, a historical name for Ione, California

=== Structures ===
- Freeze Building, a historic building in San Angelo, Texas
- Mr. Freeze (roller coaster), a shuttle roller coaster in Texas and Missouri

== Art, entertainment, and media ==
=== Music ===
==== Groups ====
- Freeez, 1980s UK dance music and jazz funk group from London
- The Freeze, a punk rock band from Boston, Massachusetts, formed in 1978
- The Freeze (Scottish band), a punk band from Edinburgh, Scotland, active 1976–1981

==== Albums ====
- Freeze (album), the tenth studio album by Herman Brood & His Wild Romance
- Freeze! (EP), the second external play by Momoland

==== Songs ====
- Freeze (KickFlip song), 2025
- "Freeze" (Kygo song), 2022
- "Freeze" (Momoland song), 2017
- "Freeze" (T-Pain song), 2008
- "The Freeze" (song), by Spandau Ballet, 1981
- "Freeze", a song by Bladee
- "Freeze", a song by Jordin Sparks from Jordin Sparks
- "Freeze", by Hailey Benedict, 2023
- "Freeze", a song by LL Cool J from Todd Smith
- "Freeze", a song by Pepper from the album Pink Crustaceans and Good Vibrations
- "Freeze", a song by Recoil from Bloodline
- "Freeze", a song by Robyn Hitchcock from Queen Elvis
- "Freeze", Part IV of "Fear" by Rush
- "Freeze", a song by Take That from III
- "The Freeze" a song by Lene Lovich from the album Flex
- "The Freeze", solo debut by Albert Collins, 1958

=== Other art, entertainment, and media ===
- Freeze!, a puzzle video game released in 2012
- Freeze (art exhibition), a 1988 art show held by various UK artists in London Docklands
- Aa Dekhen Zara, working title Freeze, a 2009 Indian sci-fi film
- Freeze (TV series), a 2006 South Korean miniseries
- Freez FM, a Dutch pop and rock music radio station
- Freeze (Japanese TV series), a Japanese show hosted by Hitoshi Matsumoto

== See also ==
- Freeze frame (disambiguation)
- Freezer (disambiguation)
- Freezing (disambiguation)
- Frieze (disambiguation)
- Frozen (disambiguation)
