= Arctic GmbH =

Computer cooling component manufacturer

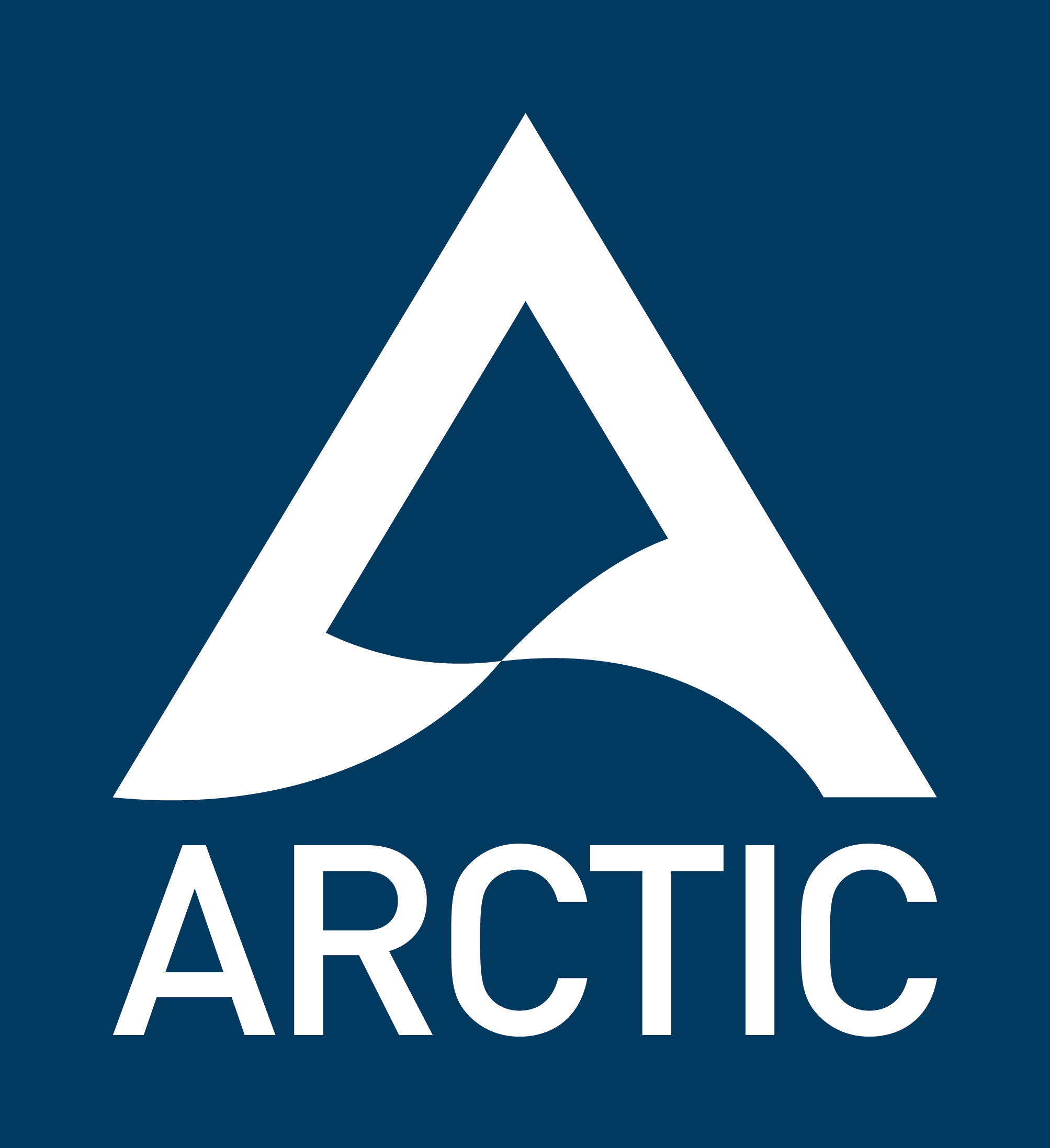
- Logo introduced in 2017
- Type: Private, GmbH
- Industry: Computer cooling; Computer peripherals; Consumer electronics
- Founded: 2001; 25 years ago
- Headquarters: Bevenroder Straße 149A, Braunschweig, Germany
- Area served: Worldwide
- Key people: Magnus Huber (Managing director)
- Products: Computer cooling; Computer case; Headsets; Home theater PC
- Website: arctic.de

Arctic GmbH, formerly known as Arctic Cooling, is a German, Swiss-founded manufacturer of computer cooling components, mainly CPU coolers, GPU coolers, case fans, and thermal compound. Since 2010, Arctic expanded its business by starting a range of products to cater other consumer demands beyond that of computer cooling hardware. Nowadays, Arctic also offers various consumer products—spanning audio, home entertainment and computer peripherals. In 2012, Arctic was nominated as one of the finalists in the annual PCR Awards.

Founded in 2001, Arctic has offices in Germany, Hong Kong and the United States and cooperates with different production facilities in China. Arctic products are distributed worldwide through distributors, dealers and retailers. The United States, United Kingdom and Germany are Arctic's major markets. The company has also collaborated with leading graphics card brands such as HIS, Inno3D, PowerColor, VTX3D, and Sapphire in the development of OEM cooling equipment.

== History ==
In 2001, Arctic Cooling was founded in Switzerland by Magnus Huber. As the company name suggested, in the past, the business focused entirely on computer cooling solutions. Today, in order to expand the business into other areas especially in consumer electronics, by 2010, it began to develop a diverse range of products that spans beyond cooling into computer peripherals, audio products and home entertainment PCs. For this reason, Arctic Cooling was changed to Arctic in 2010. Since 17.11.2015 Arctic Switzerland AG is in liquidation.

== Logo ==
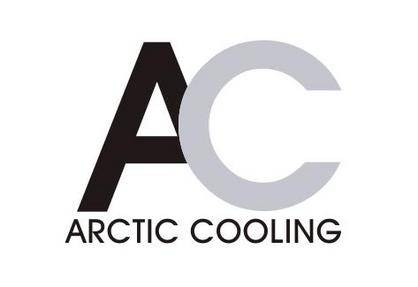
Arctic Cooling logo

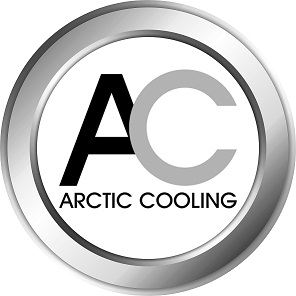
Arctic Cooling shield

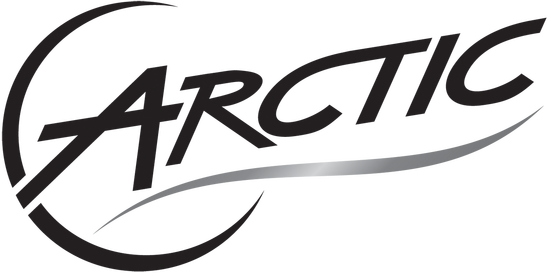
logo used from 2010 until January 2017

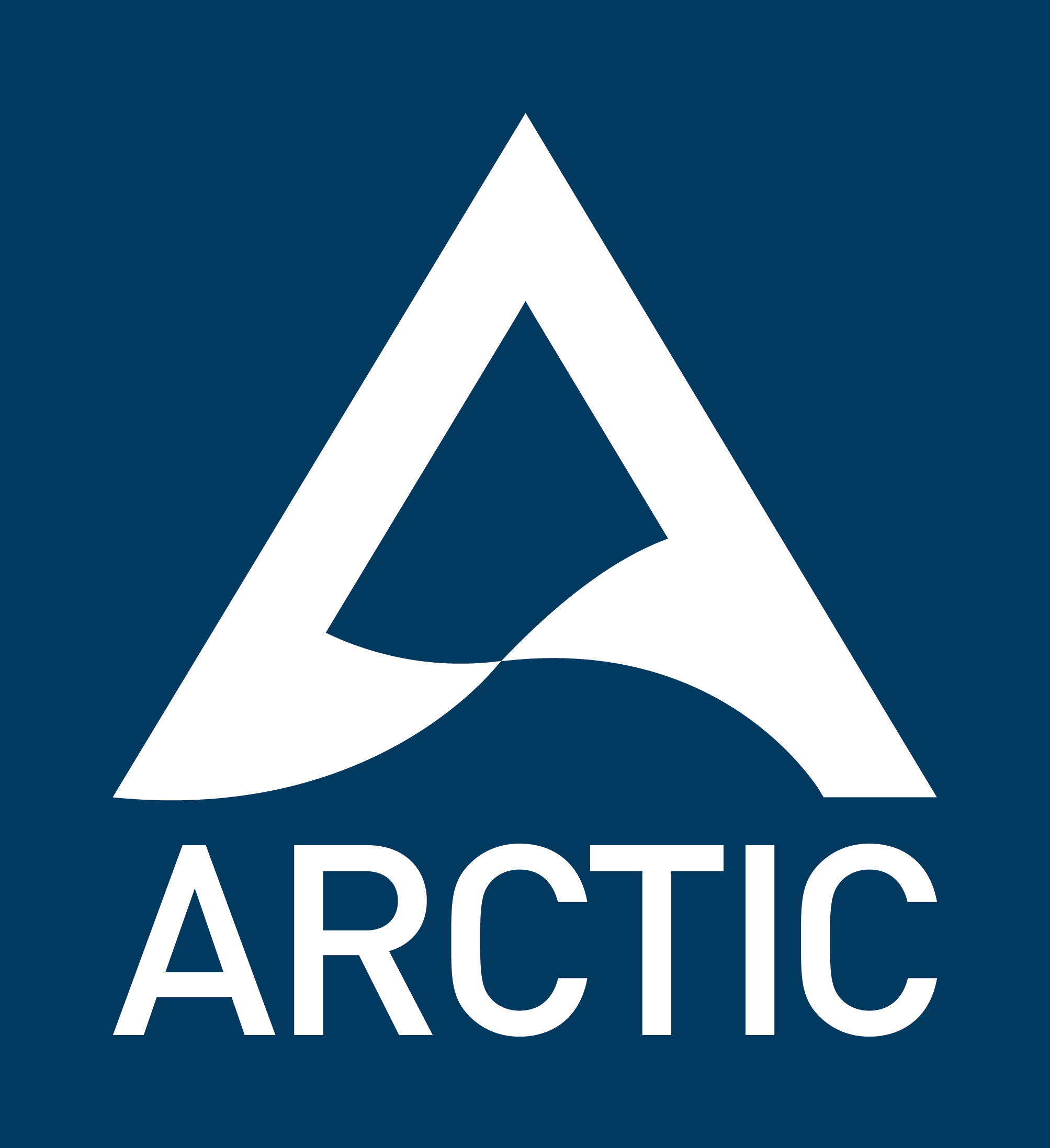
Current logo, used since January 2017

== Products ==
=== Computer cooling ===
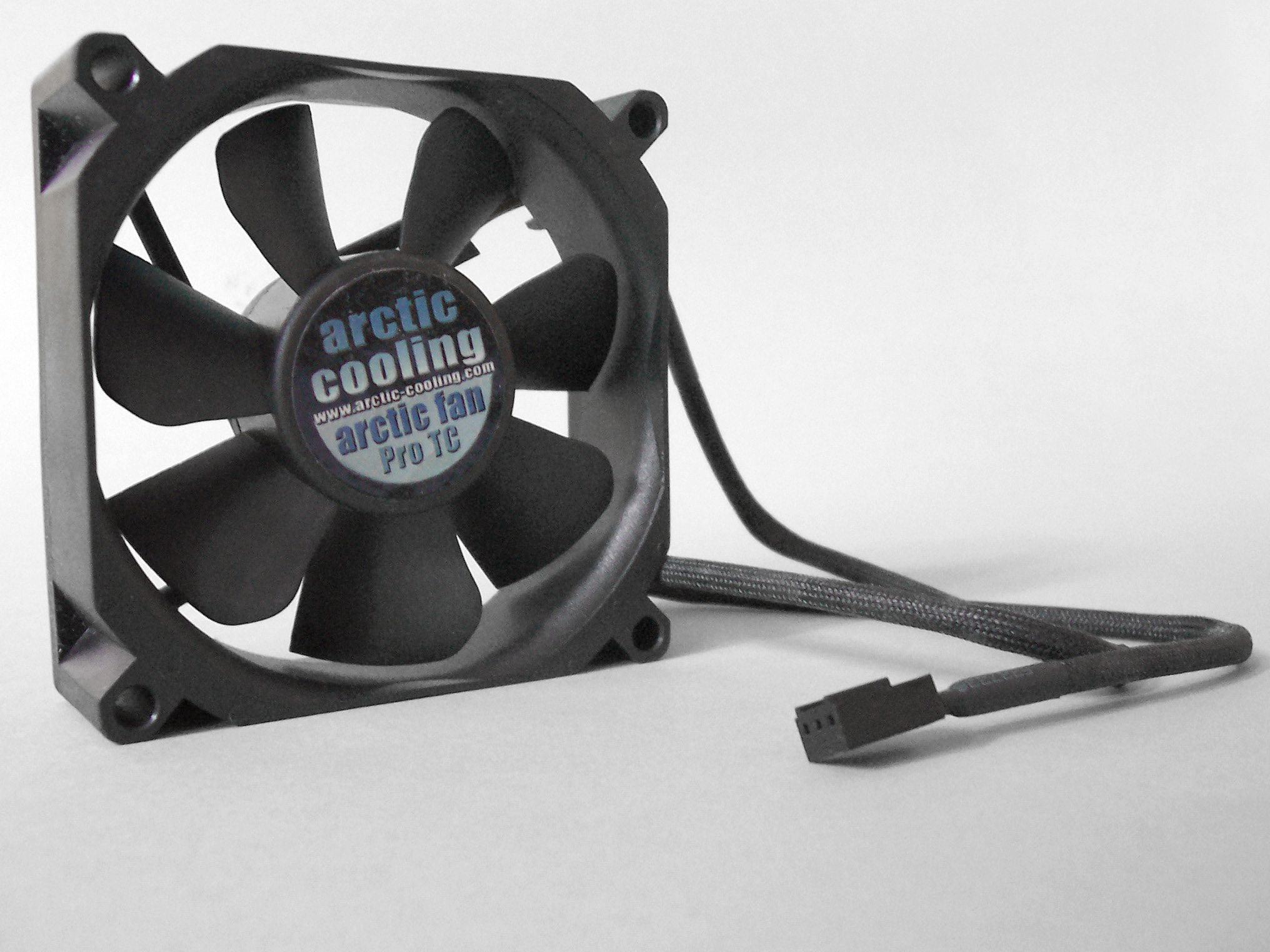
A model of Arctic Cooling 80mm computer fan

Being the company's original focus, Arctic primarily designs and manufactures cooling products for computer hardware, with broad compatibility. The company owned a number of patents for its fan and cooler designs as well as for special technologies used in the air coolers including PWM sharing, low noise impeller, cross blow and anti-vibration technologies.

Freezer

Freezer is a trademark of Arctic for its line of CPU coolers. It includes both the air cooler based on a heatpipe architecture as well as the water cooling solutions.

Alpine

Alpine is a trademark of Arctic for its line of CPU coolers based on Aluminum extrusion heatsink. It includes both active and passive coolers.

==== Accelero ====
Accelero is a trademark of Arctic (formerly Arctic Cooling) for its line of graphics card coolers. The Accelero line of coolers are targeted to high-end graphics cards based on GPUs from Nvidia and AMD. The Accelero series utilizes different types of cooling technologies namely air cooling, passive cooling as well as to offer different options for different customers. In 2006, Accelero X1 and Accelero X2 are the first VGA coolers introduced in the series by the manufacturer. The Accelero series has collaborated in a number of OEM projects with motherboard and video card manufacturers to develop customized graphics card cooling solutions. Arctic is the first video card cooler manufacturer to use a copper base for their heatsinks.
In May 2012, ARCTIC released the Accelero Hybrid, which is claimed to be the world's first graphics card cooler with integrated air and liquid solution in the market.

===== Features =====
Graphics card coolers are generally served as an upgrade or replacement for the stock cooler in order to reduce noise, temperature and enhance the overclocking capability of the GPU. Arctic's heatsinks are claimed to provide quiet, high performance cooling, which also makes the Accelero series one of the most popular graphics card coolers in the market.

==== Thermal compound ====
Among the company's array of thermal compound, the MX-4 received the Top Product Award from the German magazine PC Games Hardware.

- MX-6
- MX-4
- MX-2

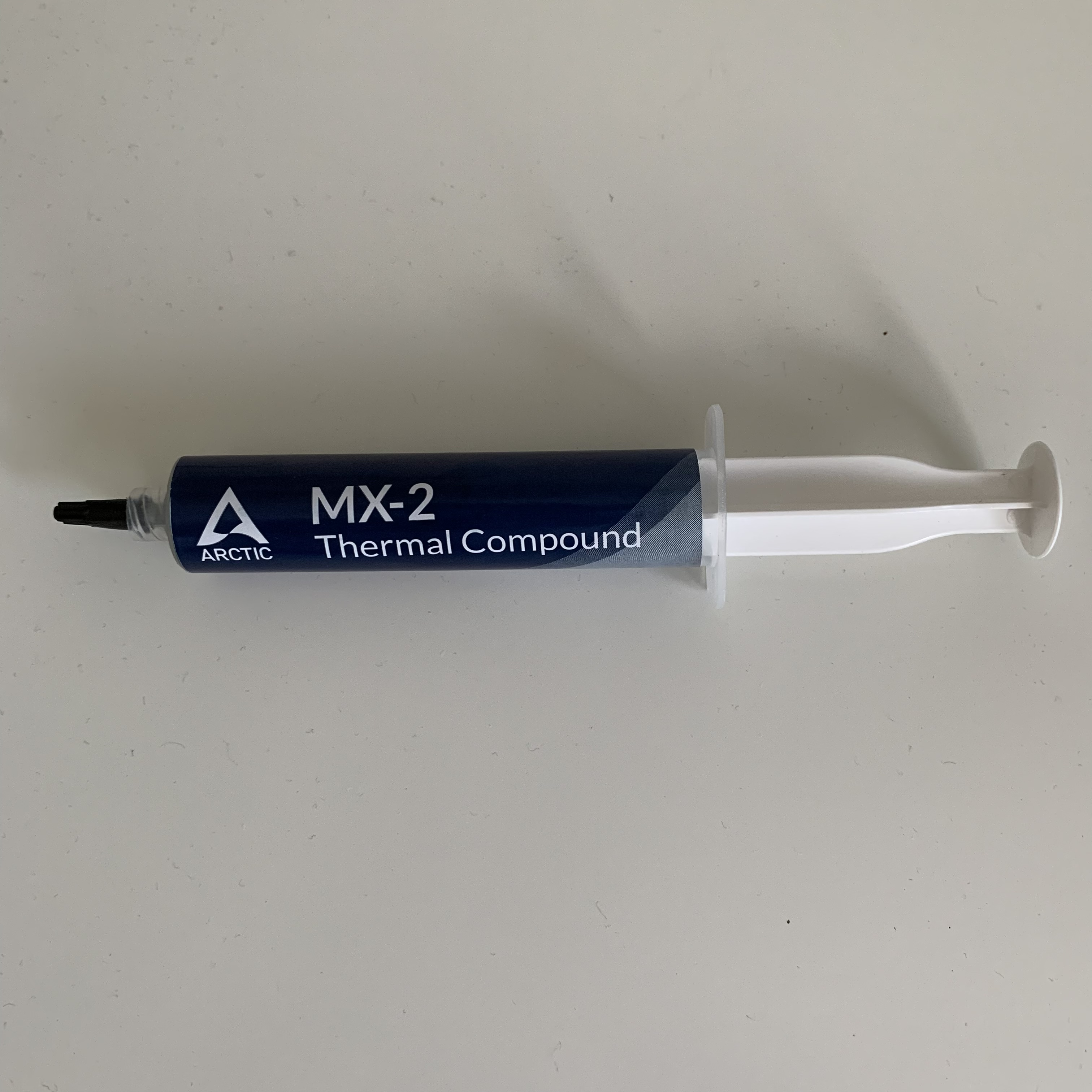
Arctic MX-2 thermal compound

==== PC case ====
- Silentium T11
- Silentium T Eco 80

==== Fusion Power Supplies and Storage Devices ====
Fusion is Arctic's brand name for various cooling and data storage products, including the Fusion 550- EU, Fusion 550RF, Fusion 550R, Fusion 550F and Fusion 1TB (external hard drive), and the Fusion 1TB data storage device.

=== Audio series ===
Arctic started to develop its audio products such as speakers, headphones and headsets since 2010 and it has expanded to wireless audio system near the end of 2011.

=== Living series ===
In June 2011, Arctic entered the HTPC market with its first mini HTPC, MC001 Entertainment Center Series, which was first introduced in Computex 2011. In 2012, Arctic introduced more advanced models with MC101 Series, AMD Trinity-powered HTPCs which are aimed for multimedia users. The MC101 Series features AMD Trinity A8/A10 APU, AMD Radeon HD 3D graphics, up to 1TB hard disk storage, SSD, up to 8GB DDR3 memory and built-in TV tuner.

On top of the entertainment centers, Arctic offers as well an audio gateway that works as a Windows Media Center Extender : Audio Relay. It is not DLNA certified but is compatible with the protocol.

Due to limited commercial success, this product line has been discontinued.

=== Computer peripherals ===
Arctic offers a selection of computer peripherals including keyboards, mice, USB fans, etc. In the end of 2011, the brand started to offer Apple accessories.

=== Power series ===
The Power series offers various USB travel adapters, car chargers and batteries.

== Patents and trademarks ==
The company has claimed several trademarks and patents for the name and technology applied to their products. Some of the air coolers and case fans produced by the company feature a patent design of the fan holder to achieve vibration absorption and elimination of the buzzing sound when the fan is running. The Freezer 7 Pro features 4 rubber connectors which serve as a vibration damper to absorb the vibration of the running fan and prevent the vibration from transferring to the heatsink and the case. The Arctic F Pro PWM employs the same technology to absorb vibration and prevent it from transmitting across other components within the case.

Arctic claims to be the patent holder of the PWM Sharing Technology, namely PST, which shares a single PWM signal with all the other PWM controlled devices connected to the motherboard to control all fan speeds and enhance the noise level according to the load.

The Freezer 13 PRO CO employs the patented Cross-Blow technology by the use of an extra fan installed at the bottom of the heatsink to give a boost of cooling performance to the surrounding components, including Northbridge and voltage regulators.

The company utilizes its patented passive cooling technology (DE 20200600) in the Accelero S1 PLUS to enhance the level of natural convection from the GPU by letting more air to pass through the aluminum fins so that heat will be dissipated more efficiently.

Some of the key products including Freezer, Accelero, Alpine, Fusion and Silentium series are registered trademarks in the EU and the US.

== Branding ==
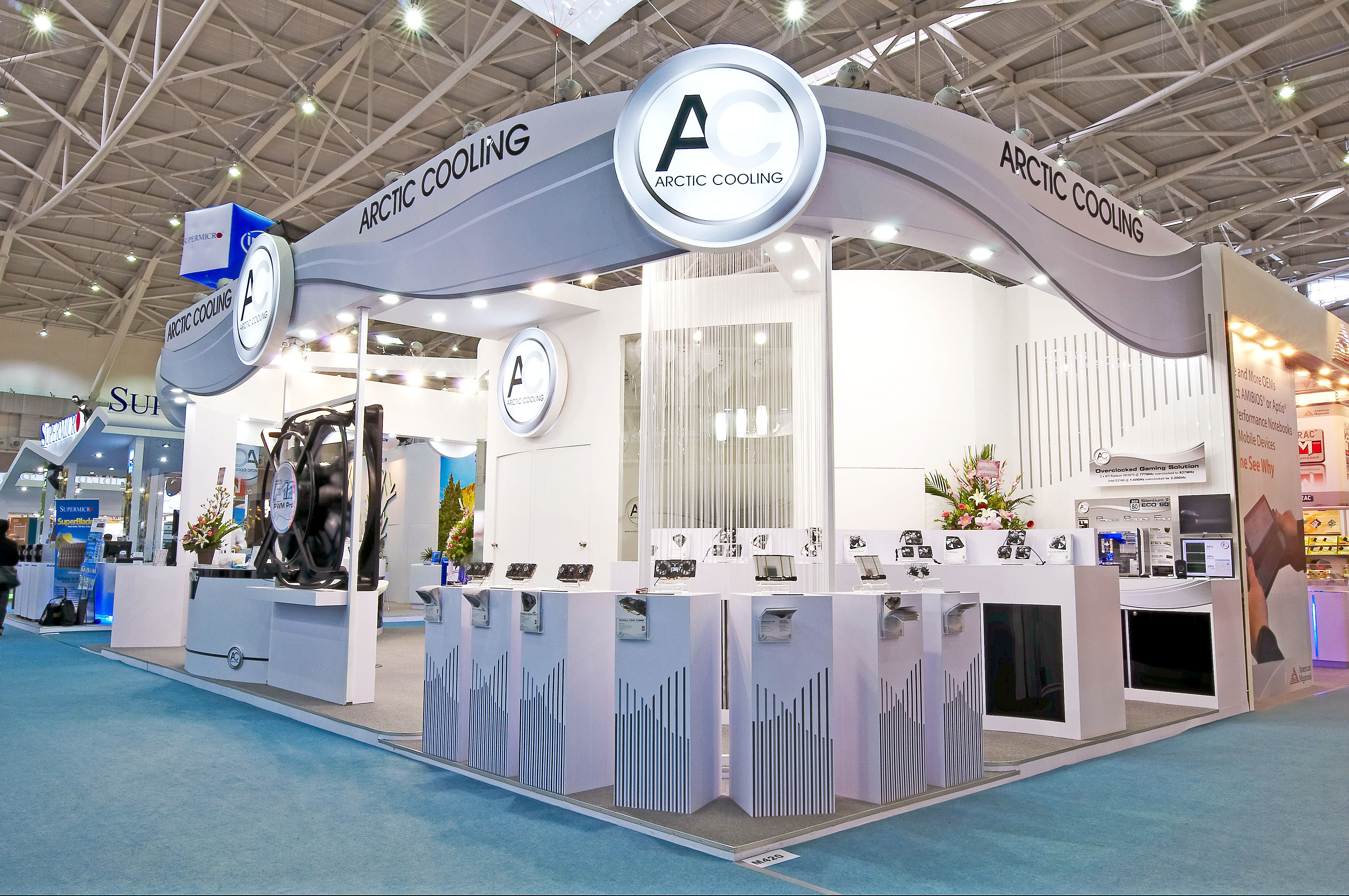
Arctic's booth in computex, Taiwan, 2008

In 2011, Arctic has started to engage its end consumers through the means of social media (e.g. Facebook) to reinforce the brand's awareness. The company was also a platinum partner with PCR Retail Boot Camp – a new conference and expo for the UK PC and IT channel.

== Collaborations ==
Arctic also produces cooling solutions for several graphic card manufactures; in most cases improving cooling beyond the OEM cooler. These include but are not limited to:

- AMD (formerly ATI)
- Club 3D
- ECS
- Galaxy
- Hightech Information System (HIS)
- Inno3D
- TUL (PowerColor)
- Sapphire Technology
- Sparkle
- Zotac

== Partnership with OpenELEC ==
Due to the strategic mistake of bundling the MC001 with Microsoft Windows 7 and the high price the MC001 was very badly sold. To increase sales, on 5 February 2013, Arctic announced their new partnership with OpenELEC. Arctic worked with OpenELEC together and combined a fully passive cooled entertainment system - the MC001 media centre (US and EU version) equipped with the latest XBMC 12 (OpenELEC 3.0) platform. Arctic and OpenELEC were planning on their next release, aimed to provide a more dedicated builds for the Arctic MC001 systems. Shortly after their partnership with OpenELEC, the development of passively cooled media centers was abandoned.

== Dispute ==
Arctic was reportedly planning to file a lawsuit against AMD for the infringement of its trademark "Fusion", the name that AMD used to describe its series of APUs which integrate x86 processing cores with Radeon stream processors on the same piece of silicon. In light of the lawsuit, AMD has announced earlier in 2012 its plans to drop its Fusion branding in favor of the Heterogeneous Systems Architecture (HSA). On 23 January 2013, Arctic announced that the company and AMD arrived at a mutual agreement in settling the "Fusion" trademark dispute without any disclosure of the terms.
