= EVGA Corporation =

Taiwanese electronics company

- Type: Private
- Industry: Computer hardware Consumer electronics
- Founded: April 13, 1999; 27 years ago in California, United States
- Founders: Andrew Han; Keith Rochford
- Headquarters: Taipei, Taiwan
- Products: Motherboards; Audio cards; Power supplies; Cases; Cooling; Keyboards; Mice
- Number of employees: 250+
- Divisions: EVGA GmbH; EVGA Technology Inc.
- Website: evga.com

EVGA Corporation is a Taiwanese company that produces motherboards, gaming laptops, power supplies, all-in-one liquid coolers, computer cases, and gaming mice. Founded on April 13, 1999, its headquarters are in Taipei, Taiwan. EVGA also produced Nvidia GPU-based video cards until 2022.

== Products ==
EVGA products include motherboards, power supply units, and related accessories.

== History ==
EVGA initially made graphics cards, dating back to the RIVA TNT2 in 1999. Some of their graphics card models included the SC, SSC, Classified, Kingpin (stylized as K|NGP|N), and FTW editions (as well as special KO editions in the past). In September 2022, the company ended its relationship with Nvidia and also stopped manufacturing graphics cards.

Initially, its motherboards were limited to Nvidia reference designs and expanded to non-reference designs based on Nvidia chipsets until Nvidia exited the motherboard market around 2009. EVGA motherboards began using Intel chipsets starting with the announcement of the "X58 SLI" in November 2008, which was a motherboard supporting 3-way SLI. In March 2009 EVGA released the "X58 Classified" (E759) that increased the PCI Express (PCIe) capabilities by adding more physical slots and added an Nvidia NF200 bridging chip that increased the electronic PCIe lanes available, as well as other overclocking features.

In September 2009, EVGA released a motherboard (XL-ATX form factor) that allows up to four GPUs to run in a 4-way SLI configuration. The first graphics processing unit to support 4-way SLI was the EVGA GTX 285 Classified; more recent GPUs like the GTX 980 also support 4-way SLI. The company released a dual-socket motherboard based on the Intel 5520 chip set with overclocking features. Named Classified SR-2, this motherboard supports dual Socket LGA 1366 Xeon-based Intel CPUs and 4-way SLI. It was the first HPTX form factor motherboard.

In August 2010, EVGA released the Classified SR-2 power supply with 1200 watts of power at 6 +12 volts.

In May 2011, EVGA entered the CPU air cooler market with the introduction of the Super clock CPU cooler.

In November 2013, EVGA released its first tablet computer, the EVGA Tegra Note 7, in the United States. It is a 7-inch Android tablet powered by a Tegra 4 processor.

In May 2016, EVGA released its first gaming laptop called the EVGA SC17.

In June 2021, EVGA announced its first AMD-based motherboards starting with the X570 Dark (A579), which was released in September. Later that year, EVGA also released the X570 FTW (A577).

In February 2025, EVGA archived the Forum section of their web page, without prior notice. It directed users to a Reddit section created for EVGA to interact with users online.

=== Recalls and design issues ===
In April 2007, EVGA & Nvidia confirmed that there was an issue running high performance DIMM modules on 680i-chipset motherboards.

In May 2012, EVGA issued a recall of Geforce GTX 670 SC (SuperClocked), model# 02G-P3-2672-KR graphics cards due to a quality assurance (QA) issue. Affected models were replaced with a faster FTW Edition.

In November 2013, EVGA issued a recall of SuperNova PSUs models 1000 G2, 1000 P2 and 1300 G2 models manufactured prior to October 1, 2013, due to a manufacturing flaw. All affected models were replaced by updated units.

In September 2014, owners of GTX 970 SC (SuperClocked) pointed out that the ACX cooler design only had two heat pipes touching the core, with a 3rd unsealed "dummy" heatpipe attached to the cooler.

In October 2016, lower-end SKUs of GTX 1070 and GTX 1080 models with the ACX cooler design started reportedly failing, or even catching on fire. This was due to the VRMs not being cooled by the heatsink due to missing thermal pads. In November 2016, EVGA issued a VBIOS update to attempt to help alleviate the issue. They also announced a program for users to either receive thermal pads to self-install while retaining warranty or send in affected GPUs for factory replacement.

In September 2021, players of New World reported their RTX 3090 cards "bricking". The issue was traced via X-ray analysis to poor workmanship on soldering around the MOSFET circuits. The company said they would replace all affected cards under warranty. However, further testing by Igor Wallossek revealed that RTX 3080 cards were also affected.

=== Exit from GPU partnership and manufacturing ===
On September 16, 2022, EVGA announced that it would be exiting the GPU business and terminating its partnership with Nvidia. At the time of the announcement, GPU sales accounted for close to 80% of EVGA's gross revenue. EVGA's CEO, Andrew Han, explained that the company did not have an interest in becoming an add-in board partner for other GPU vendors, such as AMD Radeon or Intel Arc, nor did EVGA plan to sell to another company. EVGA planned to continue to sell remaining RTX 30 series cards stock through the end of 2022 to complete the exit from the Nvidia partnership. Han further explained that Nvidia's conduct with its business partners was causing it to be difficult to maintain a consistent profit margin and thus the company would instead focus on other products with higher margins, such as power supply units and CPU coolers.

== See also ==
- ASRock
- Asus
- BFG Technologies
- Club 3D
- Elitegroup Computer Systems (ECS)
- Gigabyte Technology
- MSI
- PowerColor
- Sapphire Technology
- 3dfx
- AMD
- Intel
