= BumpTop =

Desktop application

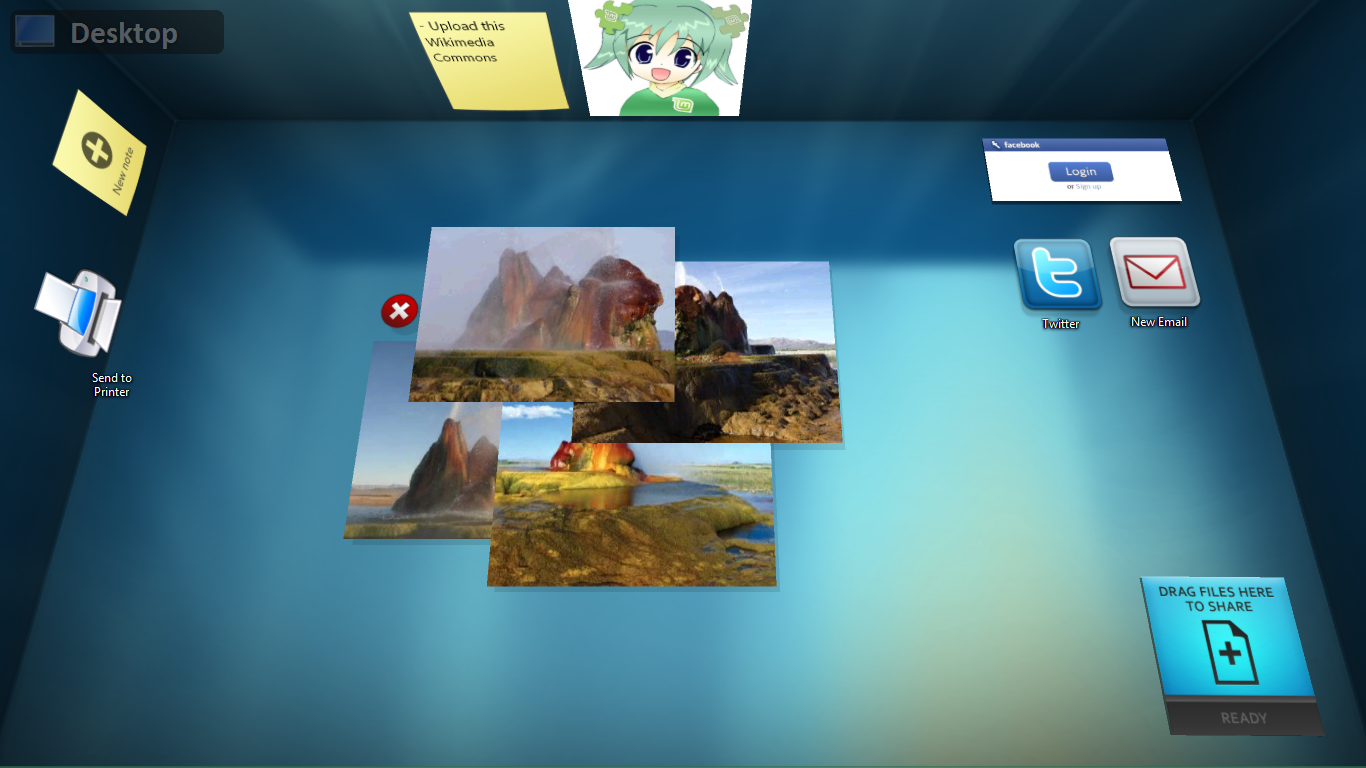
- Original author: Anand Agarawala
- Developer: Google
- Release: April 8, 2009; 17 years ago
- Final release: 2.5 / March 31, 2010; 16 years ago
- Operating system: Windows XP and later, Mac OS X Snow Leopard and later
- Size: 17–21 MB
- Type: Desktop environment
- License: Apache license 2.0
- Website: bumptop.github.io
- Repository: github.com/BumpTop/BumpTop

BumpTop is a 3D desktop environment that simulates the normal behavior and physical properties of a real-world desk and enhances it with automatic tools to organize its contents. It is aimed at stylus interaction, making it more suitable for tablet computers and handheld PCs. It was created at the University of Toronto as Anand Agarawala's master's thesis. Agarawala also gave a presentation at the TED conference about his idea. The 1.0 version was released on April 8, 2009, along with a fully featured pro version as a paid upgrade. On April 30, 2010 the author announced that BumpTop was being discontinued and that they were taking the software "in an exciting new direction." Two days later, it was announced that the company had been acquired by Google. On January 5, 2011, Google released a sneak preview video of Android 3.0 Honeycomb showing a 3D desktop with features purportedly taken from BumpTop.

== Product ==
In BumpTop, documents are represented as three-dimensional boxes lying on a virtual desk. The user can position the boxes on the desk using the stylus or mouse. Extensive use of physics effects like bumping and tossing is applied to documents when they interact, for a more realistic experience. Boxes can be stacked with well-defined gestures. Multiple selection is performed by means of a LassoMenu, which fluidly combines in one stroke the act of lasso selection and action invocation via pie menus. BumpTop currently supports Windows XP, Vista, and 7, and a version for Mac OS X was released into private beta on January 18, 2010. The Mac edition omits the pie menu in favor of a more normal selection menu.

The software installer and the application phone home. While the download page on the official website does state: "Internet connection required for activation", this may not appear in other sources such as Cnet. There is no explicit dialog box asking the user to confirm this connection at the time it is required.

BumpTop automatically updates to the latest version.

== Multi-Touch ==
With the release of BumpTop 1.2 on October 9, 2009, multi-touch support was added for Windows 7. It added 14 new gestures to the system that used multiple touches on the screen. One such gesture is “scrunching” your hand to pull files into a pile. Just like the regular version of BumpTop, the extensive use of physics is applied to these multi-touch gestures. Multi-touch support has since been added to Mac OS X as well.

Multi-touch support is currently only available in the Pro version of the software.

== BumpTop Inside ==
On August 18, 2009, BumpTop announced their new “BumpTop Inside” program. Partnering with HIS, PowerColor, and SAPPHIRE, a free copy of BumpTop will be included with their graphics cards. The reasoning behind the partnership was to allow BumpTop to be spread to more customers, as well as allowing BumpTop to use the power of the newly bought graphics card. “BumpTop creates a brand new user experience for computer desktops,” said Ted Chen, CEO of TUL Corporation. “We are excited to add this innovative application into our graphics solution. Backed by the power of PowerColor graphics, BumpTop will make the user experience more vivid and change the way the traditional computer desktop is used.”

== Reception ==
BumpTop has been generally well received by critics, with many of them excited about the possibility of BumpTop's features becoming standard in GUIs. CNET Editor Seth Rosenblatt gave it 5 stars, citing that “it could push how we use our computers into a whole new dimension.” Thanks to the added multi-touch support, Engadget says that “BumpTop gives Windows 7 touchscreen PCs purpose.” CrunchGear simply says “BumpTop: A Better Windows desktop.” On BumpTop's website, they have 23 quotes of positive reviews from professional editors.

== Acquisition by Google ==
In April 2010, it was announced that BumpTop had been acquired by Google. It was unknown what Google had planned for the software, though there were speculations about plans to revamp it for a new Android based tablet UI. Shortly after its acquisition, BumpTop announced plans to remove the software completely from its website, only giving "End of Life" support to those who bought the Pro version.

The server-side licensing and validation system was then removed from Google and users that had the licensed version got it reverted to the free version after some time. This actually made activating the software impossible without using cracks.

Finally, in August 2012, Google released the source code of BumpTop on GitHub under the Apache license. According to released source code, the project is no longer maintained.

== See also ==
- Project Looking Glass
- Metisse
