= Refrigerator (disambiguation) =

A refrigerator is a cooling appliance comprising a thermally insulated compartment and a heat pump.

Refrigerator may also refer to:

- Refrigerator (horse), an American racehorse
- "The Refrigerator", nickname of William Perry (American football) (born 1962), former professional American football player
- The Refrigerator (film) a 1991 horror film

== See also ==
- Refrigerator Bowl, an American college football bowl game between 1948 and 1956 in Evansville, Indiana
- Refrigeration
- Fridge (disambiguation)
- Freezer (disambiguation)
