= Hold Everything Dear =

Studio album by Cindytalk
- Released: 2011
- Recorded: 2006–11
- Label: Editions Mego

Hold Everything Dear is a 2011 album from Cindytalk released by Editions Mego, catalogue number eMEGO 122. All tracks were written and recorded by Cindy Sharp and Matt Kinnison, 2006–11.

== Description ==
The following description is from the Editions Mego website: "Hold Everything Dear is the third installment in the new Cindytalk sound which started with 2007’s The Crackle of My Soul, and then last years Up Here in The Clouds. It is the first in the trilogy to feature musicians other than Cindy Sharp namely the late Matt Kinnison, to whom the album is dedicated. Inspired by the John Berger book of the same name, this latest release is whole new set of parameters which push the sound on the previous two works to an extreme point of abstraction, and in some places near silent passages and haunted melodic segments. And what a mysterious journey this ends up being with increased use of piano and found/field recordings giving all the tracks a blurry soundtrack appeal to the point where the definitions between the tracks and are no longer clearly defined. It harks back to the odder parts of In This World and The Wind Is Strong... albums from the early 1990s."

Reviews of the album include Dusted Magazine and PopMatters.

== Track listing ==
1. How Soon Now... (5:01)
2. On the Tip of My Tongue (1:21)
3. In Dust to Delight (6:38)
4. Fly Away Over Here (9:14)
5. Waking the Snow (1:25)
6. From Rokko-San (6:01)
7. Hanging in the Air (8:27)
8. Fallen Obi (1:42)
9. Those That Tremble As If They Were Mad (6:13)
10. Floating Clouds (8:47)
11. I See You Uncovered (1:42)
12. ...Until We Disappear (7:29)

== Versions ==
- LP 2011 Editions Mego
- CD 2011 Editions Mego
