= What's for Dinner? =

What's for Dinner? may refer to:

- What's for Dinner? (Canadian TV series), a Canadian cooking show
- What's for Dinner? (South Korean TV series)
- What's for Dinner? (album), 2006 album by The King Khan & BBQ Show
- "What's for Dinner?", a song by Dominic Fike, from the album What Could Possibly Go Wrong
- "What's for Dinner?" (Severance), 2022 TV episode
- Dad, What's For Dinner?, a 2025 cookbook
