= Frozen =

Frozen may refer to the result of freezing. It may also refer to:

== Films ==
- Frozen (1997 film), a film by Wang Xiaoshuai
- Frozen (2005 film), a film by Juliet McKoen
- Frozen (2007 film), a film by Shivajee Chandrabhushan
- Frozen (2010 American film), an American thriller by Adam Green
- Frozen (2010 Hong Kong film), a Hong Kong romance film by Derek Kwok
- Frozen (franchise), a Disney media franchise based on the 2013 film
  - Frozen (2013 film), a Disney animated film inspired by Hans Christian Andersen's The Snow Queen
  - Frozen Fever (2015), a short sequel to the film Frozen (2013)
  - Olaf's Frozen Adventure (2017), a featurette short sequel to the film Frozen (2013)
  - Frozen II (2019), the sequel to the film Frozen (2013)
- Frozen (advertisement), a 2014 political advertisement

== Music ==
=== Albums ===
- Frozen (album), by Sentenced, released in 1998
- Frozen (EP), by Curve
- Frozen (soundtrack), from the 2013 Disney animated film of the same name

=== Songs ===
- "Frozen" (Delain song), from their 2006 album Lucidity
- "Frozen" (Lil Baby song), released in 2022
- "Frozen" (Madonna song), from her 1998 album Ray of Light
- "Frozen" (Tami Chynn song), released in 2008
- "Frozen" (Within Temptation song), from their 2007 album The Heart of Everything
- "Frozen", a song by All That Remains from Overcome (bonus track)
- "Frozen", a song by Celldweller from Celldweller
- "Frozen", a song by Dissection from The Somberlain
- "Frozen", a song by Loona yyxy from Beauty & the Beat
- "Frozen", a song by Nightrage from Descent into Chaos
- "Frozen", a song by Sanctuary from The Year the Sun Died
- "Frozen", a song by Skid Row from Subhuman Race
- "Frozen", a song by Theatre of Tragedy from Forever Is the World
- "Frozen", a song by State Champs from Living Proof

== Television ==
- "Frozen" (House), a season episode 4 of House
- "Frozen" (Stargate SG-1), a season 6 episode of Stargate SG-1

== Theatre ==
- Frozen (musical), a Broadway musical based on the film Frozen (2013), opened in spring 2018
- Frozen (play), a 1998 stage play by Bryony Lavery
- Frozen – Live at the Hyperion, a 2016 musical stage play, inspired by the film Frozen (2013)

== See also ==
- Freeze (disambiguation)
- Freezing (disambiguation)
- Frozen assets (disambiguation)
- Frozen Lake (Montana)
