= Frieze (disambiguation) =

A frieze is the wide central section of an entablature.

Frieze may also refer to:

- Frieze (textile), a napped woolen cloth made from Frisian wool
- Frieze Art Fair, a London art fair
- Frieze (magazine), a London-based art magazine
- Frieze group, a mathematical concept
- Frieze (horse), a British Thoroughbred racehorse and broodmare best known for winning the 1952 Epsom Oaks

== People ==
- Alan M. Frieze (born 1945), English mathematician
- Arkley Frieze (1914–1969), American politician, Missouri senator
- Henry Simmons Frieze (1817–1889), American educator and administrator

== See also ==
- Frieza, a character in Dragon Ball media
- Freeze
