= Cindytalk =

Band

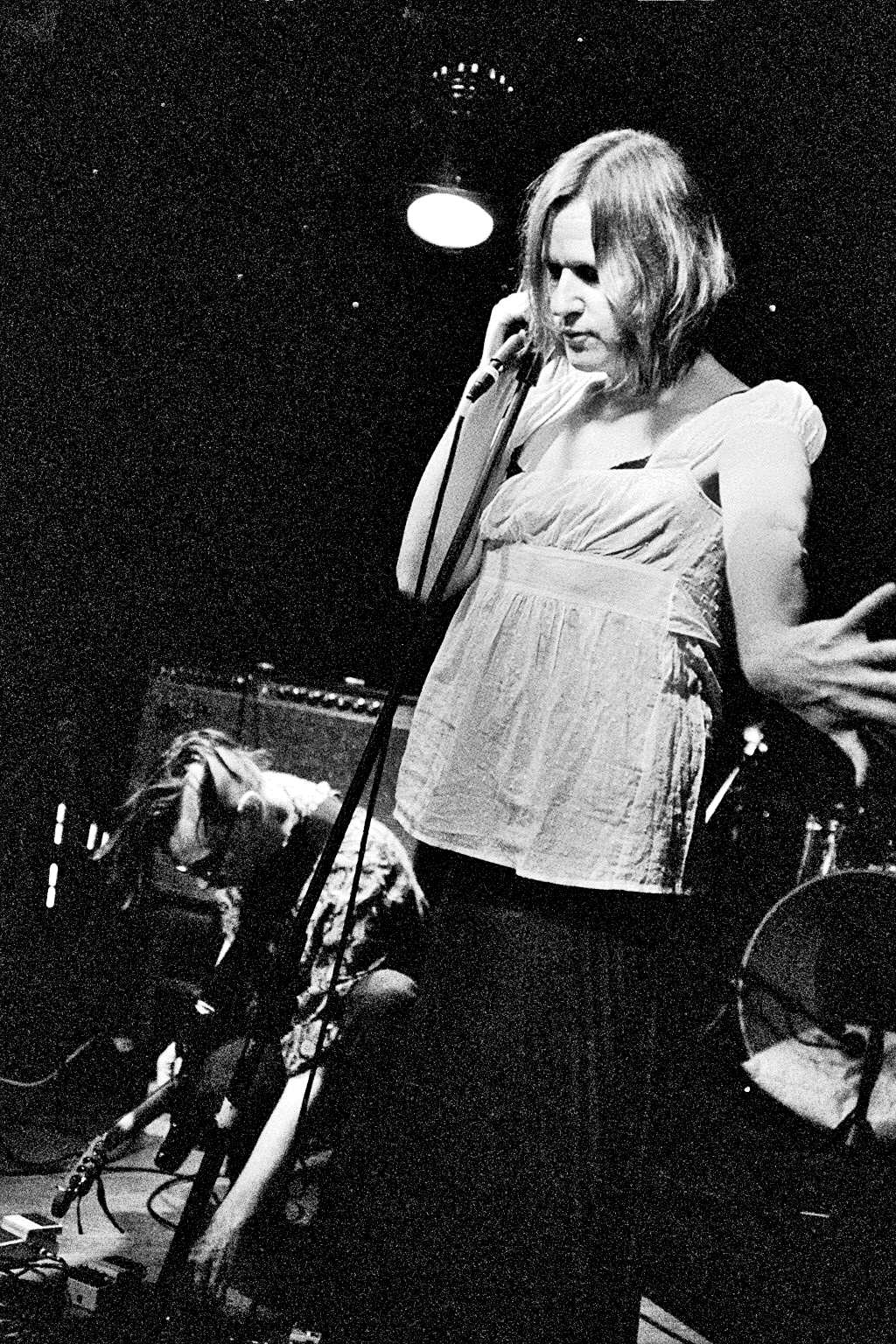
- Cindytalk (2009)

Background information
- Origin: Scotland
- Genres: Experimental, post-punk, Industrial
- Years active: 1982–present
- Labels: Midnight Music, Touched, Editions Mego, Handmade Birds
- Members: Cindy Sharp; David Ros; Melanie Clifford; Tim Goldie; Kenneth Wilson; Lucy Duncombe; John Byrne
- Past members: David Clancy; Matt Kinnison; Alex Wright; Debbie Wright; Kevin Rich; Sherrill Crosby; Paul Middleton; Gary Jeff; Daniel Knowler; Paul Jones
- Website: cindytalk.net

Cindytalk is a long-running British post-punk, experimental music, dark ambient and drone rock band founded in 1982 by Cindy Sharp (earlier credited as Gordon Sharp and sometimes known as Cinder).

The band was for many years signed to the English indie label 4AD. Cindytalk has more recently become a solo project of Cinder, a Scottish performer and the only constant member since their formation in 1982.

== 1982–2003 ==
Cindytalk was formed in 1982 by vocalist Cinder (then credited as Gordon Sharp) and David Clancy (guitar, keyboards; formerly of Edinburgh-based punk rock/new wave band The Freeze). After re-locating to London in 1982, Cindytalk began to work towards their debut album Camouflage Heart, with a darker and more fractured sound that drew much from post-punk and early European industrial music. In 1983 Cinder and Clancy were joined by John Byrne who proved to be a crucial component in Cindytalk's deliberately disintegrating sound.

In 1984 Sharp became well known for singing lead vocals on three songs on the 4AD collective This Mortal Coil's album "It'll End in Tears: "Kangaroo", (an Alex Chilton composition) "Fond Affections" ( a cover of a Rema Rema song ) and "A Single Wish". The album became a surprise hit, and according to critic Sean O'Neal, "if anything, that album actually belongs to Cindytalk’s Gordon Sharp” due to more vocal features than other contributors.

The album Camouflage Heart appeared to some critical acclaim in the UK music press. Shortly after, David Clancy left the band and was replaced by brother/sister team Alex and Debbie Wright. The album In This World was recorded over the next three years: two albums of the same name were released simultaneously.

During this period Cindytalk had worked in tandem with the artist and film maker Ivan Unwin, providing sound for some of her short pieces. This led Cindytalk to scoring Unwin's "Eclipse: An Amateur Enthusiasts Guide to Virus Deployment", the record of which was released on Midnight Music in 1990 under the title The Wind Is Strong..., the album, following on from the second of the In This World albums, was based on piano improvisations and abstract/concrete experiments. At the time Sharpe described the album as "Ambi-dustrial" fusing her love of the early ambient releases on the EG label with European Industrial music. Sharpe was joined by Ivan Unwin and co-producer/engineer David Ros. Secrets And Falling, a 4-track e.p. culled from the Wappinschaw sessions was released in 1991.

By 1993, Cindytalk had gone through more changes and was preparing to play live for the first time. Sharpe, Middleton and Ros were joined by Paul Jones, Andie Brown, Mark Stephenson and Simon Carmichael to record and release 1994's "Muster"/"Prince of Lies" 7" (Touched/World Serpent).

== 2003 to present ==
2003's Klang Galerie 7" release "Transgender Warrior/Guts of London" saw Cindytalk move into more abstract areas, taking a closer look at the rhythms, tones and melodies of noise. Since 2004, Sharpe has split her time between Japan and the UK, working on various projects. This has included Cindytalk performing live (solo or group), and a number of (mostly solo) recordings.

The Vienna-based label Editions Mego have released a series of Cindytalk albums mostly comprising solo work by Sharpe: The Crackle of My Soul (2009), Up Here in the Clouds (2010), Hold Everything Dear (2011), and A Life Is Everywhere (repast) (2013). A vinyl double album The Poetry of Decay collects both The Crackle of My Soul and Up Here in the Clouds (2010). A 10-inch vinyl split release in tandem with Robert Hampson was released in 2010, featuring Cindytalk's "Five Mountains of Fire" and Robert Hampson's "Antarctica Ends Here".

Member Matt Kinnison died from cancer in May 2008.

The album touchedRAWKISSEDsour was released in 2014. In 2014, they played the BBC Tectonics festival, sharing a billing with Thurston Moore. Of Ghosts and Buildings (2021) was released on the Japanese label Remodel, and Subterminal (2022) on the UK label False Walls, both continuing Cinder's integration of electronics with field recordings.

">Born Trembling" a 2024 album by Tremble With Joy, a collaboration between Cinder, Michael Anderson (Drekka), Mark Trecka and Michael Carlson (remst8) was released on the False Walls label.

== Discography ==
Albums

- Camouflage Heart (1984) (UK Indie #22)
- In This World (1988)
- The Wind Is Strong... (1990)
- Wappinschaw (1995)
- The Crackle of My Soul (2009)
- Up Here in the Clouds (2010)
- The Poetry of Decay (2010)
- Hold Everything Dear (2011)
- A Life Is Everywhere (2013)
- touchedRAWKISSEDsour (2014)
- The Labyrinth of the Straight Line (2016)
- Of Ghosts and Buildings (2021)
- Subterminal (2022)

Singles

- "Secrets and Falling" (1991)
- "Prince of Lies" (1993)
- "Transgender Warrior" (2003)
- "Silver Shoals of Light" (2008)
- "Five Mountains of Fire" (2010)

Other contributions

- "Playtime" – Abstract Magazine Issue 5 LP on Sweatbox Records (1985)
- "Splinter and Move" – Between Today and Tomorrow LP on Midnight Music (1986)
- "Empty Hand" – Sound From Hands CD on Minus Habens Records (1992)
- "This Salt Heals All My Wounds" – Dreaming Out Loud: Emigre Music Sampler No. 3 CD on Emigre Records (1994)
- "Sentinel" – Extreme Electronics and Splintered Beats Mix CD on Darkmatter Soundsystem (2003)
- "Canto" & "Surrounded By Sky and the Stillness of Time" – Ruines & Vanités CD on Meidosem Records/Trinity Magazine (2007)
- "A Distant Kite" – Twelve-Foot Wize CD on Bluesanct (2010)
- "A Question of Re-Entry" – A duo with Phillipe Petit, Lumberton Trading Company (017) (2011)
- "In the Mouth of the Wolf" – a project with Ancient Methods on Jaime Williams and Powell's label Diaganol (2016)
- >Born Trembling< by Tremble With Joy (2024), a collaboration between Cinder, Michael Anderson (Drekka), Mark Trecka, and Michael Carlson (remst8); on the False Walls label.

== Sources ==
- Aston, Martin (2013). Facing the Other Way: The Story of 4AD. London: The Friday Project. ISBN 978-0-00-748961-9.
- Raymonde, Simon (2024). In One Ear: Cocteau Twins, Ivor Raymonde and Me. London: Nine Eight Books. ISBN 978-1-78870-938-5.
