= Dad, What's For Dinner? =

2025 book

- Author: David Nayfeld and Joshua David Stein
- Genre: Cookbook
- Publisher: Alfred A. Knopf
- Publication date: 2025

Dad, What’s For Dinner? is a cookbook by David Nayfeld and Joshua David Stein published in 2025 by Alfred A. Knopf.

== Background ==
The book was written by David Nayfeld, who had worked as a chef at Eleven Madison Park before opening his own restaurant, Che Fico, in San Francisco. Nayfeld wrote the book based on his experiences cooking with his daughter. The recipes are categorized according to how messy or time-consuming they are, and includes advice on batch cooking.

== Reception ==
Ron Block of Library Journal gave the book a positive review, writing that "there’s a lot to entice young sous-chefs, and Nayfield also encourages parents by sharing his personal successes and struggles." Emily Dreyfuss of The San Francisco Standard also praised the book. Noah Kaufman of Bon Appétit praised it for [taking] into account the actual lived experience and priorities of so many working parents."
