= Up Here in the Clouds =

Studio album by Cindytalk
- Released: 2010
- Recorded: 2003–10
- Label: Editions Mego

Cindytalk chronology
The Crackle of My Soul (2009)	Up Here in the Clouds (2010)	The Poetry of Decay (2010)

Up Here in the Clouds is a 2010 album from Cindytalk released by Editions Mego, catalogue number eMEGO 106.

== Background ==
Up Here in the Clouds is the second album from Cindytalk released by Editions Mego. All tracks were written and recorded by Gordon Sharp, 2003–10.

Up Here in the Clouds is the second installment in the new Cindytalk sound which started [with] last years The Crackle Of My Soul. Whereas Crackle was more of a blistering burner, Clouds has a fresher cooler sound to it, with longer tracks that slowly evolve in great patches of aural beauty. The sound that Gordon Sharp and co create now is a unique blend of cracked electronics, near awkward ambient textures that always seem to flow smoothly like the most natural of sounds around, building up a great set of modern electronic music which closes with the child like melody of the title track.

Reviews of the album include Dusted Magazine and Wire Magazine.

== Track listing ==
1. The Eighth Sea (7:49)
2. We Are Without Words (6:41)
3. I Walk Until I Fall (3:18)
4. Guts of London (6:01)
5. Switched to Lunar (3:17)
6. Hollow Stare (6:25)
7. The Anarchist Window (4:47)
8. Multiple Landings (8:28)
9. Up Here in the Clouds (2:16)

== Versions ==
- CD 2010 Editions Mego
- A vinyl double album The Poetry of Decay collects two Cindytalk albums: The Crackle of My Soul and Up Here in the Clouds.
