= The Crackle of My Soul =

Studio album by Cindytalk
- Released: 2009
- Recorded: 2001–09
- Label: Editions Mego

Cindytalk chronology
| Wappinschaw (1995) | The Crackle of My Soul (2009) | Up Here in the Clouds (2010) |

The Crackle of My Soul is a 2009 album from Cindytalk released by Editions Mego, catalogue number eMEGO 097.

== Background ==
The Crackle of My Soul is the first album from Cindytalk released by Editions Mego. All tracks were written and recorded by Gordon Sharp, 2001–09.

The following description is from the Editions Mego website: "Cindytalk have been active since 1982... During the 80s and 90s their sound was defined by broken down rock structures and abstract piano ambience. A third side to their coin emerged at the dawn of the 21st Century with a turn towards obscure computer usage pushing all resemblance of melody and conventual texture to the outer edges. 'The Crackle of My Soul' is the first full length to come from this new direction, starting in 2001 and now finally ready for release. It is also the first Cindytalk album since the 1995 release of Wappinschaw. Although very abstract in nature these 10 tracks still echo the vocal brilliance and subtle beauty that they become known for, as well as pushing back the boundaries making this an essential listen regardless if you are aware of the back catalogue or not."

Reviews of the album include Allmusic and Exclaim.

== Track listing ==
1. Signalling Through the Flames (6:11)
2. Of Ghosts and Buildings (4:29)
3. Maglev (5:30)
4. Troubled Aria (2:50)
5. Our Shadow, Remembered (3:41)
6. Feathers Burn (2:22)
7. One Hundred Years Tomorrow (5:31)
8. Transgender Warrior (6:00)
9. If We Meet, We Meet in Silence (3:46)
10. Debris of a Smile (7:28)

== Versions ==
- CD 2009 Editions Mego
- A vinyl double album The Poetry of Decay collects two Cindytalk albums: The Crackle of My Soul and Up Here in the Clouds.
