= Frozen assets =

Frozen assets may refer to

- Assets affected by an asset freezing injunction
- Frozen Assets (novel), a 1964 novel by P.G. Wodehouse
- "Frozen Assets" (Voltron), a 1985 episode of Voltron
- Frozen Assets (film), a 1992 comedy movie directed by George T. Miller
- Frozen Assets (play), a British radio play
- Frozen Assets: Cook for a Day, Eat for a Month, a series of cookbooks by Deborah Taylor-Hough in the field of Once-a-month cooking
- Frozen Assets: The New Order of Figure Skating, a book by Mark Lund
