= The Freeze (Scottish band) =

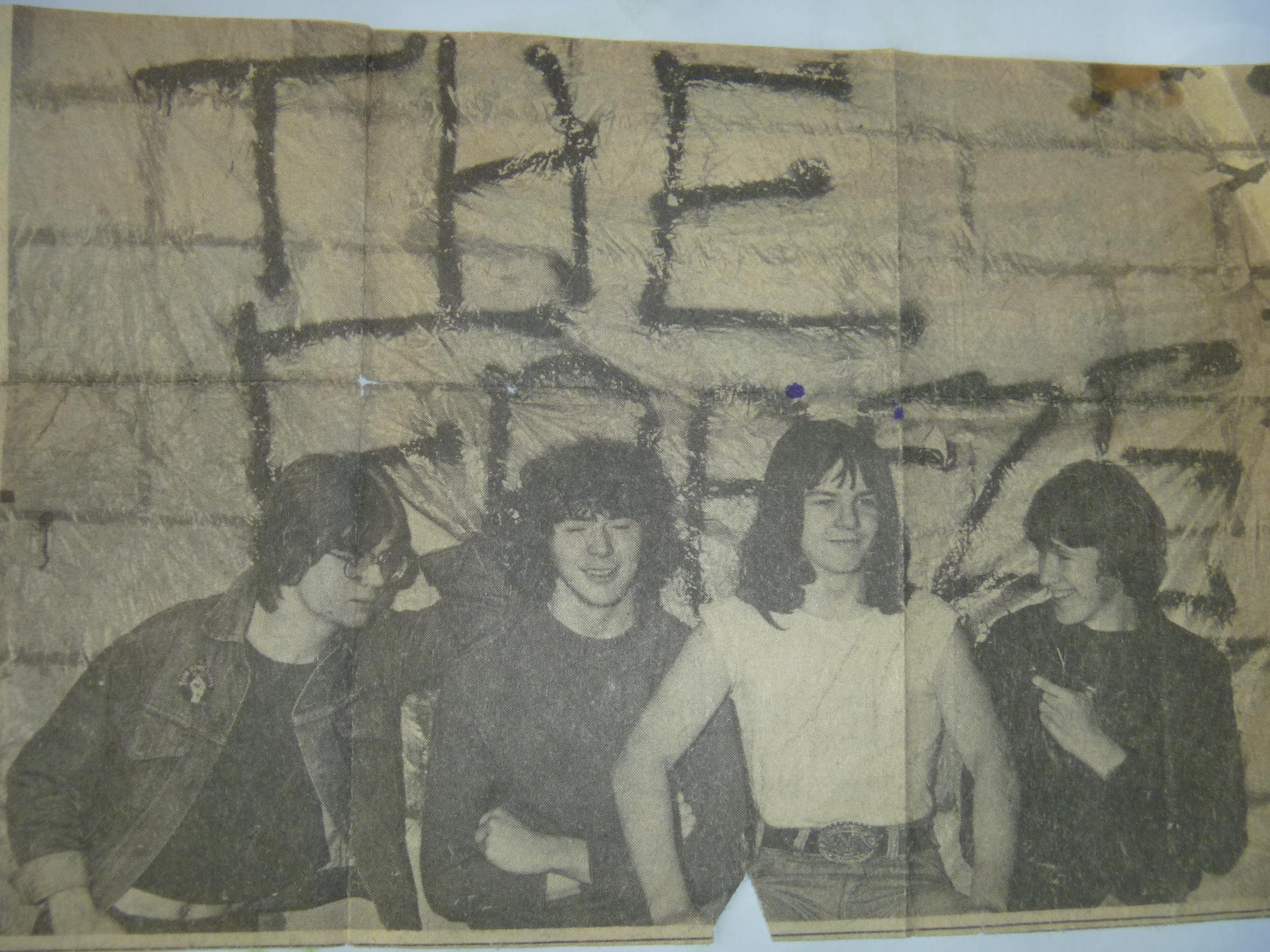

Background information
- Origin: Scotland
- Genres: Punk rock
- Years active: 1976–1981
- Past members: Gordon Sharp; David Clancy; Keith Grant; George Falconer; Graeme Radin; Neil Braidwood; Mike Moran
- Website: www.cindytalk.com

The Freeze was an Edinburgh punk band that lasted from 1976 to 1981. Wanting to do something darker and noisier, Gordon Sharp and David Clancy took ideas from The Freeze to a greater extreme; the result was the formation of Cindytalk in 1982.

== History ==
The Freeze were formed in 1976 by Gordon Sharp, David Clancy and Keith Grant, all pupils together at school in Linlithgow, West Lothian. Grangemouth based drummer George Falconer played with the band during 1977. Most notable gig during this period was a support slot for Dunfermline band The Skids. The set consisted of originals and covers of The Ramones and Brian Eno. At this time, "The Freeze" didn't fit in at all with the vogue "punk look and attitude" of the time, having an angry sound but more an affinity with bands such as Television and Talking Heads. Clancy used several effects pedals on the guitar to add depth, volume and interest to his sound. On occasion, Sharp would use a knife on the guitar whilst Clancy played, creating a challenging but glorious noise. Sharp and Falconer shared a liking for synth music, even the guilty pleasure of Vangelis, which during the punk rock era was not on. At the early stages, The Freeze were showing an interest in sound beyond the mainstream of punk or rock. Falconer left to join Falkirk band "The Deft Jerks", but met Sharp several years later. Sharp had a dress on under a denim jacket, and wore thick make up; still not fitting in, doing their own thing. By 1977 and after linking up with drummer Graeme Radin, the band started gigging around Scotland (managed by Alastair Allison, their English teacher at Linlithgow Academy, who also contributed lyrics in the early years); they often played support to many of the main punk and new wave bands of the day. Two self-financed 7 inches were released on the A1 label (Alastair Allison), 1979's In Colour EP followed by 1980's "Celebration/Crossover" single. Noticed by John Peel, they were to record two sessions at Maida Vale for his show. By 1982 the band had decided on a name change to Cindytalk and also subsequently moved to London. In 1983, Gordon Sharp joined central Scotland chums Cocteau Twins in the BBC studios to add vocals to their second Peel session. 1984 saw the release of the first and critically acclaimed Cindytalk album Camouflage Heart, as well as the release of It'll End in Tears by This Mortal Coil, on which Sharp provided vocals for three tracks, including indie chart-topper "Kangaroo" (which was also one of Peel's Festive 50's from 1984). Cindytalk have continued to release recordings over the years and are still active today.

== Members ==
- Gordon Sharp – vocals
- David Clancy – guitars, keyboards and saxophone
- Keith Grant – bass
- George Falconer – drums
- Graeme Radin – drums
- Neil Braidwood – drums and keyboards
- Mike Moran – bass

== Discography ==
- In Colour (7 inch 1979, A.1, A.1.1.A1)
1. A1. Paranoia
2. A2. For J.P.S. (With Love & Loathing)
3. B1. Psychodalek Nightmares

Written by Clancy, Sharp, Grant, Radin, Allison. Roy Jack played violin on Psychodalek Nightmares.

- Celebration (7 inch 1980, A.1, A.1.1.S.1)
1. A. Celebration
2. B. Cross-Over

Written by Clancy, Sharp, Grant, Radin. Sandy Cruikshanks played saxophone on Cross-over.

Record is dedicated to (and featuring a cover of) silent screen actress Louise Brooks.

== Peel Sessions ==
Date	Songs	Personnel and instrumentation
20 November 1980	1. Quietly Burning; 2. Sunday; 3. And Then We Danced; 4. Lullaby in Black	Gordon Sharp – vocals David Clancy – guitar, keyboards Keith Grant – bass Graeme Radin – drums
19 August 1981	1. From The Bizarre; 2. Building on Holes; 3. Location	Gordon Sharp – vocals David Clancy – guitar, keyboards, saxophone Neil Braidwood – drums, keyboards Mike Moran – bass
