= Freezer (disambiguation) =

A freezer is a device similar to a refrigerator that maintains a temperature below the freezing point of water.

Freezer may also refer to:

- Ice cream freezer or ice cream maker
- Freezer (Pokémon) or Articuno, a character in Pokémon media
- Freezer (Dragon Ball) or Frieza, a character in Dragon Ball media
- Freezer (computer cooling), a series of CPU heatsink coolers from ARCTIC
- "Freezer", a song by Band-Maid from the 2015 album New Beginning
- Freezer (film), a 2014 American thriller film

== People named Freezer ==
- C. J. Freezer (1924–2009), editor of Railway Modeller magazine
- Freezer Thompson, a professional wrestler from the United States Wrestling Association

== See also ==
- Freeze (disambiguation)
