= Freezing (disambiguation) =

Freezing is the process in which a liquid turns into a solid when cold enough.

Freezing may also refer to:

== Arts, entertainment, and media ==
- Freezing (film), a 2007 comedy film
- Freezing (manga), a manga and anime series written by Dall-Young Lim and illustrated by Kwang-Hyun Kim
- Freezing (TV series), a BBC comedy series
- "Freezing", a 2023 song from Amelia (Mimi Webb album)
- "Freezing", a 2026 song from Starface by Tyga

== Healthcare ==
- Freezing, using local anesthetics in dentistry
- Frostbite, freezing of tissues
- Gait freezing, a common motor symptom of Parkinson's disease
- Hypothermia, a biological condition in response to colder temperatures

== Other uses ==
- Directional freezing
- Freezing, the melting point of water, 0 °C (32 °F)
- Freezing air temperature
- Freezing of assets
- Freezing behavior

== See also ==
- Freeze (disambiguation)
- Frozen (disambiguation)
- Hang (computing)
