= A Life Is Everywhere =

Studio album by Cindytalk
- Released: 2013
- Recorded: 2011–12
- Label: Editions Mego

A Life Is Everywhere is the ninth studio album from Cindytalk and their fourth released by Editions Mego, released in 2013. All tracks were written and recorded by Gordon Sharp, 2011–12.

== Description ==
The following description is from the Editions Mego website: "Within their self contained world Cindytalk continue the unique trajectory that has purveyed their career starting in 1982. This instalment further explores the fearsome terrain that was initiated with previous Editions Mego releases such as 'The Crackle of my Soul' and 'Hold Everything Dear'. Throughout the 6 tracks on offer the standard fair of music is run through serious level processes leaving, taking rhythm and sound to extreme limits whilst always retaining trace elements of their core. Ringing bells are interrupted by artefacts from shredded sound matter, euphoric chords are swamped by chopped rhythms which succumb to an endless storm of electronic bliss."

Reviews of the album include Dusted Magazine, A Closer Listen and Tarumata.

== Track listing ==
1. Time to Fall (8:12)
2. My Drift is a Ghost (5:08)
3. To a Dying Star (6:13)
4. Interruptum (8:11)
5. As If We Had Once Been (3:47)
6. On a Pure Plane (6:28)

== Versions ==
- LP 2013 Editions Mego
- CD 2013 Editions Mego
