= Arkley Frieze =

American politician and attorney

Arkley W. Frieze

Member of the Missouri Senate from the 32nd district
- In office 1950–?

Personal details
- Born: June 24, 1914 Greenfield, Missouri
- Died: August 25, 1969 (aged 55)
- Party: Republican
- Spouse: Evalyn Parsons
- Children: 3 (2 sons, 1 daughter)
- Education: University of Missouri–Kansas City
- Occupation: politician, Army officer, lawyer

Arkley W. Frieze (June 24, 1914 – August 25, 1969) was an American politician from Carthage, Missouri, who served in the Missouri Senate. In 1948, he was elected city attorney for Carthage, Missouri. He was previously elected to be prosecuting attorney of Dade County, Missouri.
