= The Wind Is Strong... =

Studio album by Cindytalk
- Released: 1990
- Label: Midnight Music

Cindytalk chronology
In This World (1988)	The Wind Is Strong... (1990)	Secrets And Falling (1991)

Cindytalk studio album chronology
In This World (1988)	The Wind Is Strong... (1990)	Wappinschaw (1995)

Professional ratings
Review scores
Source	Rating
AllMusic	3/5 stars

The Wind Is Strong... is a 1990 album from Cindytalk. It was released by Midnight Music.

From the sleeve notes: "A Cindytalk diversion: Originally recorded as a soundtrack for the film Eclipse." Eclipse has never been officially released. It was directed by Ivan Unwin, a U.K.-based film-maker who had previously collaborated with Cindytalk on several short films.

== Track listing CD ==
1. Landing
2. Firstsight
3. To the Room
4. Waiting
5. Through Flowers
6. Secondsight
7. Through the Forest
8. Arrival
9. Is There a Room for Hire
10. Choked I
11. Choked II
12. Dream Ritual
13. Fuck You Mrs. Grimace
14. On Snowmoor
15. Angel Wings

== Personnel ==
- Gordon Sharp
- Ivan Unwin
- Matthew Kinnison
- Paul Middleton

== Versions ==
- LP 1990 Midnight Music, Cat# CHIME CHIME 01.03 S
- CD 1990 Midnight Music, Cat# CHIME 01.03 CD
