= Camouflage Heart =

Studio album by Cindytalk
- Released: 1984
- Recorded: 1982–1984
- Genre: Post-punk, experimental rock, gothic rock
- Label: Midnight Music

Cindytalk chronology
Camouflage Heart (1984)	In This World (1989)

Camouflage Heart is the debut album from Cindytalk released by Midnight Music in 1984. The album reached #22 in the UK Indie Chart

== Track listing ==
1. It's Luxury
2. Instinct (Backtosense)
3. Under Glass
4. Memories Of Skin And Snow
5. The Spirit Behind The Circus Dream
6. The Ghost Never Smiles
7. A Second Breath
8. Everybody Is Christ
9. Disintegrate...

Gordon Sharp - voice and instruments
David Clancy - instruments
John Byrne - instruments
Mick Harvey - drumming on "Under glass"

== Versions ==
- LP 1984 Midnight Music, Cat# CHIME 00.06 S
- CD 1988 Midnight Music, Cat# CHIME 00.06 CD
- CD 1996 Touched Recordings/World Serpent, Cat# Touch 3
