= Freeze (Japanese TV series) =

Prime Video international comedy TV format

- Also known as: Hitoshi Matsumoto presents FREEZE
- Genre: Comedy reality
- Created by: Hitoshi Matsumoto
- Presented by: Hitoshi Matsumoto
- Country of origin: Japan
- Original language: Japanese
- No. of series: 2
- No. of episodes: 10

Production
- Running time: 40–60 minutes
- Production companies: FANY Studio, Yoshimoto Kogyo

Original release
- Network: Amazon Prime Video
- Release: 19 September 2018 – 10 July 2020

Hitoshi Matsumoto presents FREEZE (Japanese: HITOSHI MATSUMOTO presents FREEZE)（ヒトシ マツモト プレセンツ フリーズ) is a Japanese comedy show created and hosted by Hitoshi Matsumoto thataired on Amazon Prime Video from 19 September 2018 to 10 July 2020.

It has several international adaptations, many of which are marketed under the name Freeze.

== Format ==
In this comedy show, the game is set in an "ice tower", and the system involves players winning their way up from the lowest floor to the top.

The eight participants must immediately sit in their chairs, cross their arms, and remain silent and expressionless when the presenter presses the button to announce "FREEZE". They are free to move around once Matsumoto presses the "RELEASE" button and announces "RELEASE". The mechanisms during FREEZE will be operated according to Matsumoto's instructions.

The competition is held several times per stage, and at the end of each stage, Matsumoto will decide to eliminate two contestants. In the second stage, there will be six contestants, and in the third stage, four, with two advancing to the final. However, the six contestants who have been eliminated so far will first participate in a loser's bracket, and the winner of that bracket will also advance to the final. A final round will be held with three contestants to determine the winner. The winner will receive one million of yen.

From the 2nd season, the competition has changed to a three-team format with four members per team and Matsumoto participated this season as part of the comedian team.

Each team selects one representative to go to a separate room and endure the traps. The representative can participate in multiple rounds. The chairs they sit in can be decided by mutual agreement among the representatives. As in 1st season, when "FREEZE" is called, they must immediately sit in their chairs, cross their arms, and remain silent and expressionless until "RELEASE" is called.

The game consists of two or three rounds of the prank, each round being referred to as a "match" during the program. After each round, the representative who reacted the most is eliminated. If an entire team is eliminated, that team is disqualified. The team whose representative "didn't move the most" in the final round is declared the winner. Also in this season, the winning team receives one million of yen.

The program, at the 25th Asian Television Awards, held on 18 January 2021, won the Best Original Digital Entertainment Program award.

== Seasons ==
Season	Premiere	Finale
1	19 September 2018	27 October 2018
2	10 July 2020	

== International versions ==
Country	Name	Host(s)	TV station	Premiere	Finale
Italy	Freeze - Chi sta fermo vince!	Nicola Savino and Rocío Muñoz Morales	Rai 2	16 September 2025	21 October 2025
Portugal	Congela	Pedro Teixeira	TVI	8 June 2024	present
Spain	Congelados	Àngel Llàcer	La Sexta	15 September 2026	present
