= Freeze! =

2012 video game

Freeze! - The escape
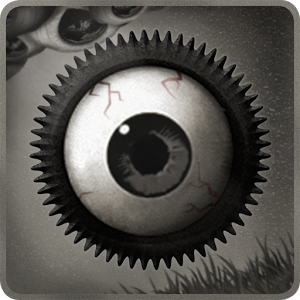
- App icon
- Developer: Frozen Gun Games
- Publisher: Frozen Gun Games
- Engine: Corona SDK
- Platforms: iOS, Android,
- Release: November 2012
- Genre: Puzzle
- Mode: Single-player

Freeze! is a puzzle video game developed by Frozen Gun Games and released in November 2012 for iOS and Android. The game reached the top of the App Store in 61 countries. It received several awards and has downloaded over ten million copies. The concept and gameplay were developed by Andreas von Lepel, who designed games for the Commodore 64, Amiga, and Game Boy in the 1980s. The artwork with its dark, atmospheric images was designed by Jonas Schenk.

== Gameplay ==
As a small round hero in eye shape it is necessary to solve different puzzles. The player does not control the character itself, but the prison cells. With the "Freeze" Button the gravity can be deactivated and the eye remains in its place. The cells can be turned to the right position. If you activate the gravity again, the eye drops in the adjusted direction. Deadly stings and various enemies complicate the levels.

== Reception ==
The game won Casual Games Association's Indie Prize Europe 2013 award. It is also one of the ten best games in 2013 of the Android Quality Index. The game received "generally favorable" reviews, according to video game review score aggregator Metacritic.
