= Fridge (disambiguation) =

Fridge refers to refrigerator, an electrical appliance.

Fridge may also refer to:

- Fridge (band), a British post-rock band
- Fridging, a plot device to which the website Women in Refrigerators is dedicated
- "Nuke the fridge", idiomatic expression for unoriginality in film franchises
- The Fridge (nightclub), a nightclub in Brixton, South London
- William Perry (American football), former professional American football player nicknamed "The Fridge"
- Anthony "Fridge" Johnson, a fictional character from the Jumanji franchise
- Harry Maguire, English professional football player nicknamed "Fridge"
