= Freeze, Idaho =

Unincorporated community in Idaho, United States

- Unincorporated community
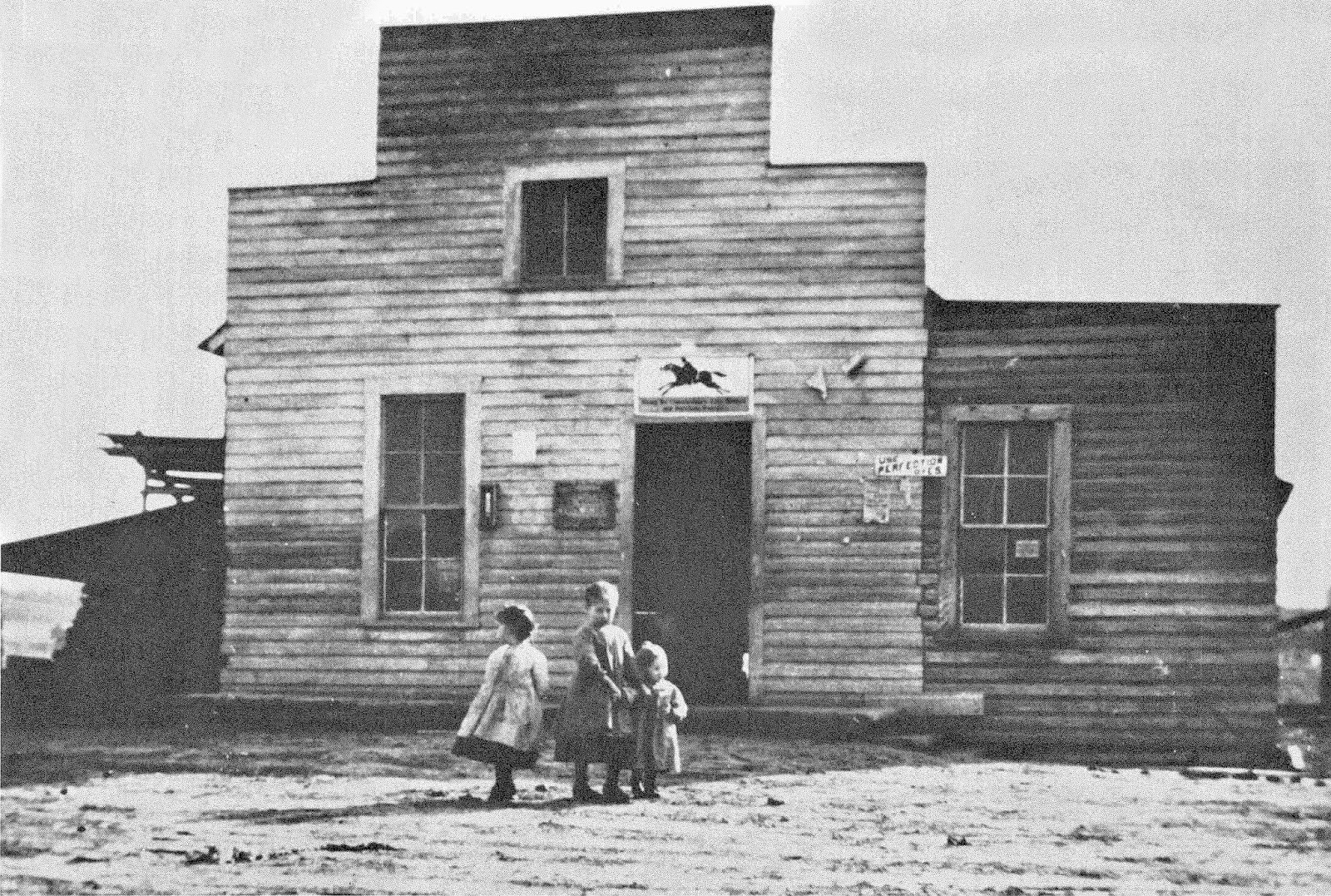
- Freeze Grocery and post office (circa 1899–1907)

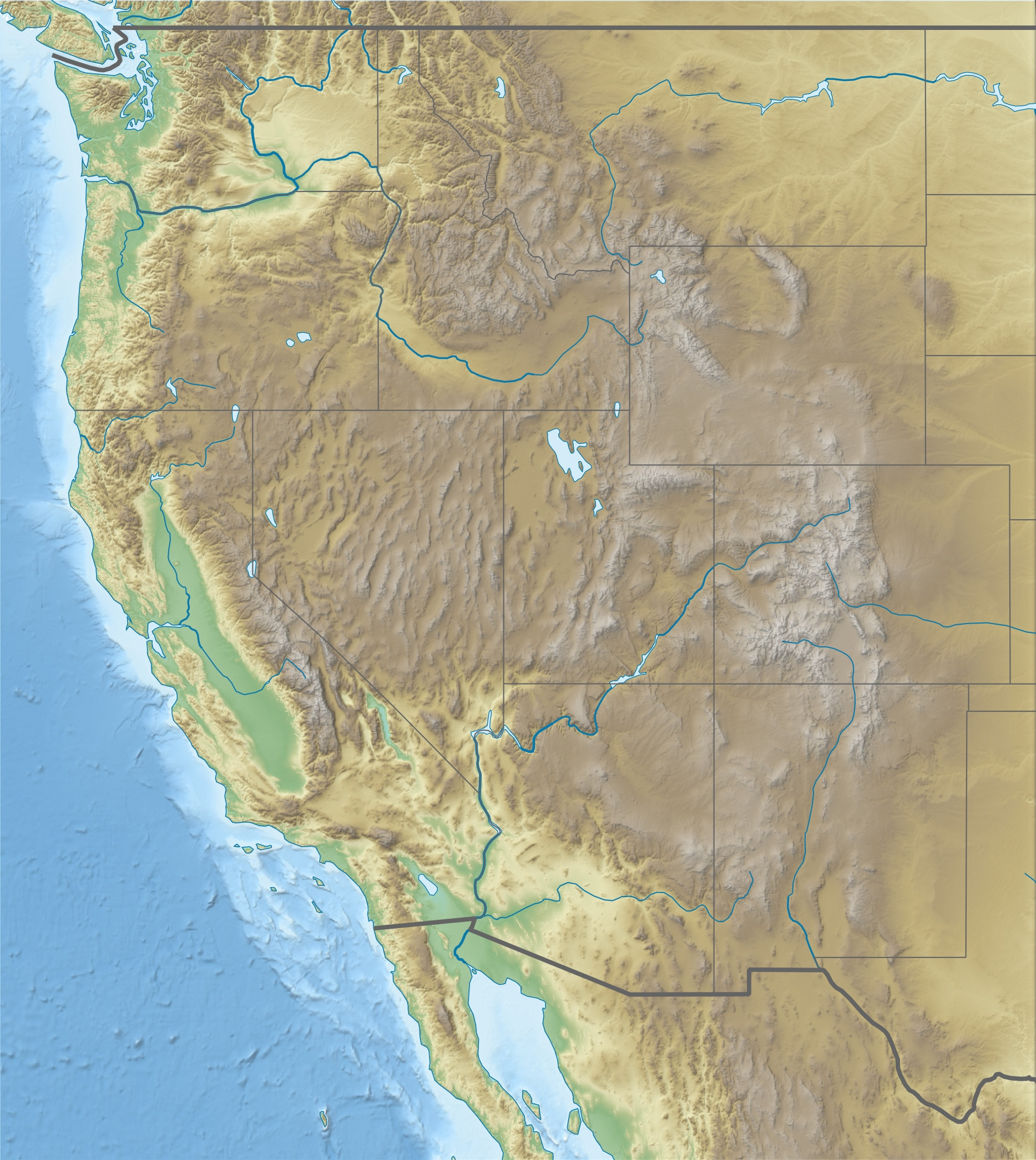
- Location within Idaho Location within USA West
- Coordinates: 46°57′43″N 116°56′34″W
- Country: United States
- State: Idaho
- County: Latah
- Elevation: 2,523 ft (769 m)
- Time zone: UTC-8 (Pacific (PST))
  - Summer (DST): UTC-7 (PDT)
- Area codes: 208, 986
- GNIS feature ID: 399482

Freeze is an unincorporated community in Latah County, in the U.S. state of Idaho.

== History ==
A post office called Freese was established in 1899, and remained in operation until it closed in 1907. The community was named for the Freeze (or Freese) family of pioneer settlers.
