= Freezer (computer cooling) =

Freezer series
- Developer: Arctic
- Type: CPU Heatsink Cooler
- Released: 2011
- Website: www.arctic.ac

The Freezer is the name of the CPU coolers from Arctic GmbH, which has been the company's staple product for many years. To most enthusiasts, Arctic is best known for their Freezer line of CPU coolers as well as their thermal compound called MX-2 and MX-4. The Freezer line of coolers is available in different fan speed, cooling capacity and motherboard compatibility to cater the needs of different type of users from HTPC users to enthusiasts and overclockers. The Freezer series CPU coolers are designed to lower the temperature inside your computer to enhance the stability and lifespan of the processor.

== Products ==
=== Low-profile ===
- Freezer 7 LP
- Freezer 11 LP
- Freezer 64 LP

=== Mid-range ===
- Freezer 7
- Freezer 64
- Freezer 7 PRO Rev. 2
- Freezer 64 PRO
- Freezer XTREME Rev.2
- Freezer 13

=== Enthusiast-grade ===
- Freezer i30
- Freezer A30
- Freezer 13 PRO
- Freezer 13 PRO CO
- Freezer 13 CO
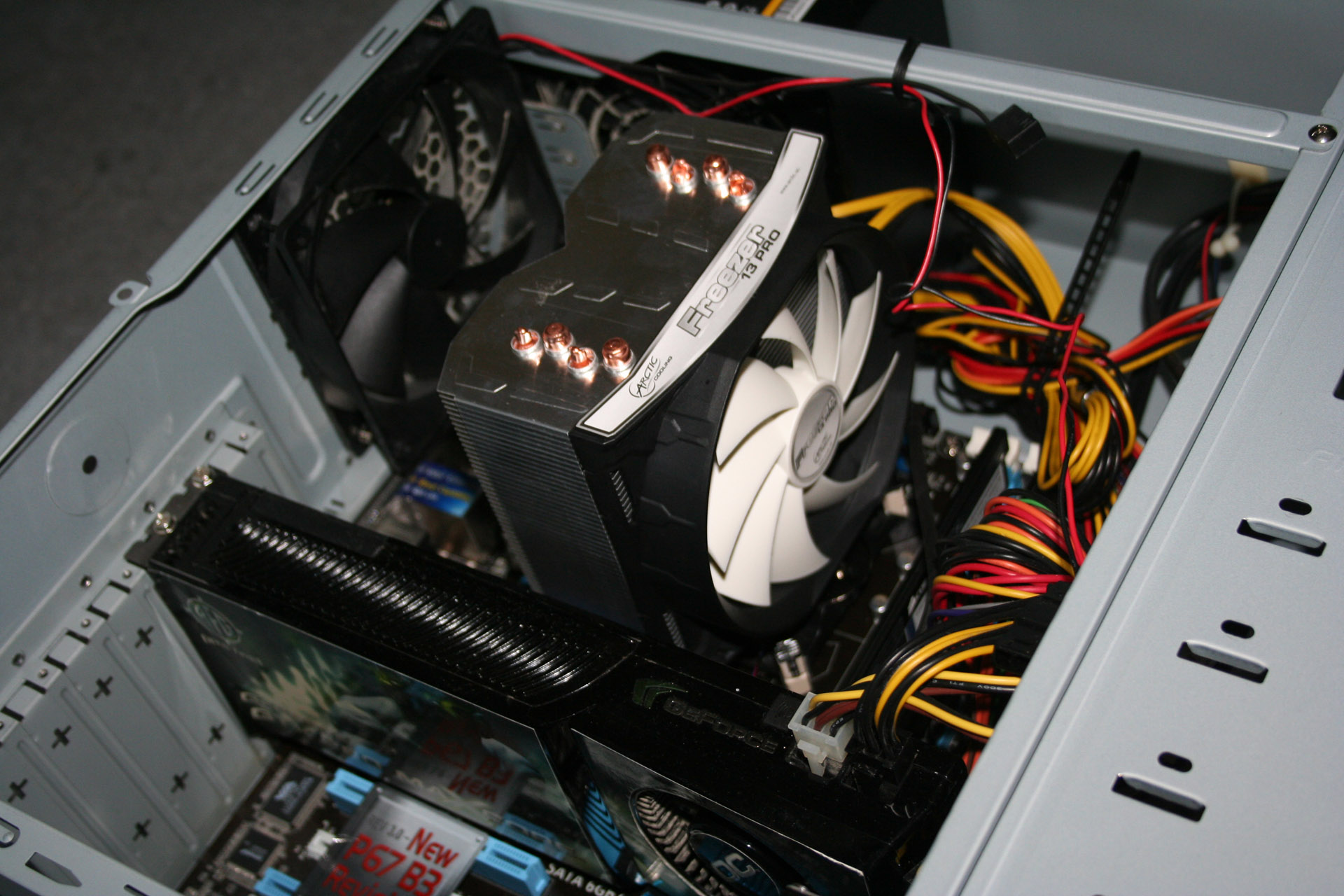
Arctic Freezer 13 Pro installed in a PC system

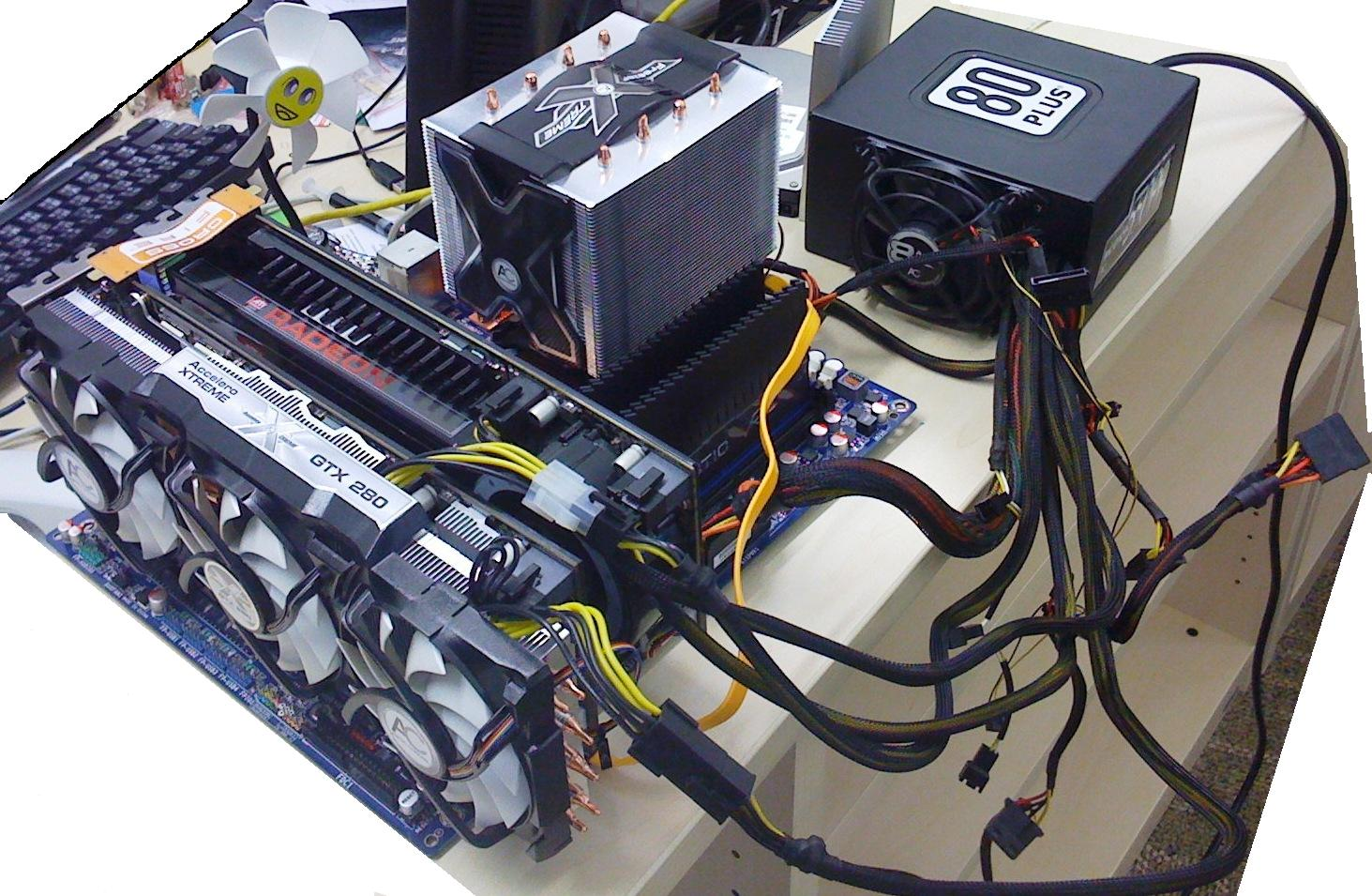
A system with CPU and graphics card cooling support by Arctic

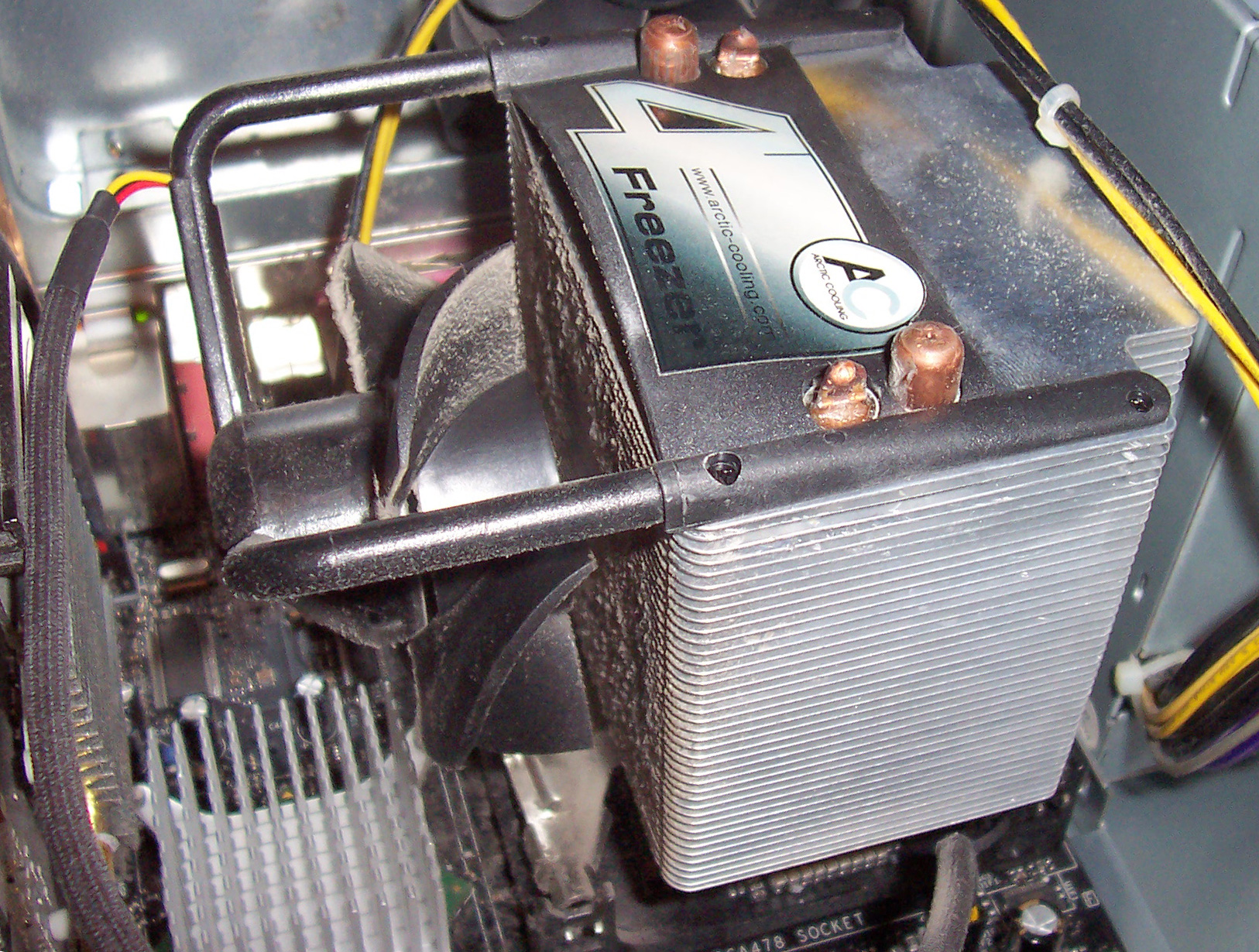
Freezer 4, CPU fan with heatsink

== See also ==
- Intel
- AMD
