= Club 3D =

Club 3D B.V.
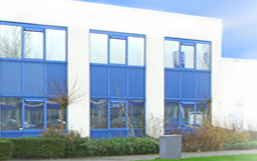
- Headquarters in the Netherlands
- Company type: Private company
- Industry: Semiconductor
- Founded: 1997; 29 years ago (Club 3D since 2005)
- Headquarters: Hoofddorp, The Netherlands
- Products: Graphics cards Sound cards TV tuner cards
- Website: www.club-3d.com www.club-3d.de www.club-3d.nl

Club 3D, founded in 1997 as Colour Power (Club 3D since 2005), is a Dutch brand of video cards and digital multimedia products such as TV tuner cards and digital sound cards for PCs, featuring AMD graphics chipsets and technologies.

== History ==
Pioneers in the introduction of the first graphics cards from S3 Graphics, 3dfx, ATI Technologies and NVIDIA. Previously the only privately owned company in the world that officially sold AMD/ATI and NVIDIA under one brand.

- 2001 – Pioneers at being the first AIB (Add-in-Board) for ATI/AMD. Launched ATI AIB solutions at Computex, 2001.
- 2001 – Branch office in Germany for the DACH market
- 2003 – Official partnership with S3 Graphics
- 2003 – Official partnership with XGI Technologies
- 2004 – Generated an excess of 900,000 retail unit sales of ATI Technologies video card graphics adapters
- 2006 – Official partnership with NVIDIA Corporation
- 2006 – Launched Theatron products, range of sound cards
- 2007 – Launched VAX Barcelona bag accessories range
- 2010 – Official launch of the accessories division
- 2011 – Official launch of high end 80 plus switching power supplies division
- 2011 – Official launch of SenseVision division, USB powered video graphics adapters
- 2013 - Drops NVIDIA support and commits to AMD only.
- 2016 - First to market worldwide with the Displayport 1.2 to HDMI 2.0 Active Adapters
- 2016 - Stopped manufacturing graphics cards.
