= PowerColor =

Taiwanese graphics card brand

TUL Corporation 撼訊科技股份有限公司
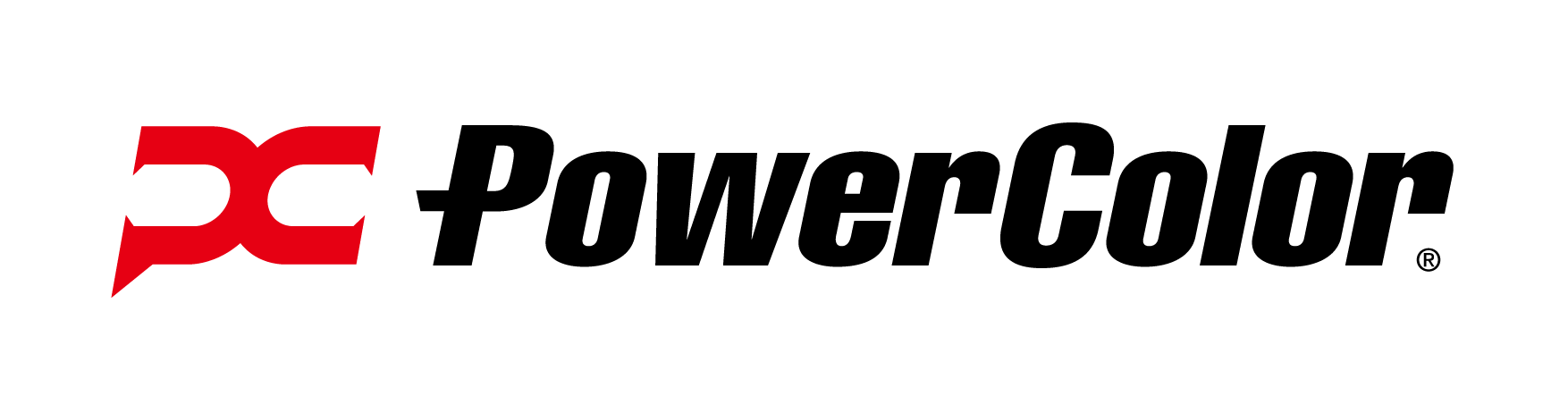
- Industry: Computer
- Founded: 1997; 29 years ago
- Headquarters: New Taipei, Taiwan
- Products: Graphics cards
- Website: www.powercolor.com

PowerColor is a Taiwanese graphics card brand established in 1997 by TUL Corporation (撼訊科技), based in New Taipei, Taiwan. PowerColor maintains office locations in a number of countries, including Taiwan, the Netherlands and the United States. The United States branch is located in City of Industry, California and serves the North and Latin American markets. TUL also has another brand, VTX3D, which serves the European market and some Asian markets.

== Products ==
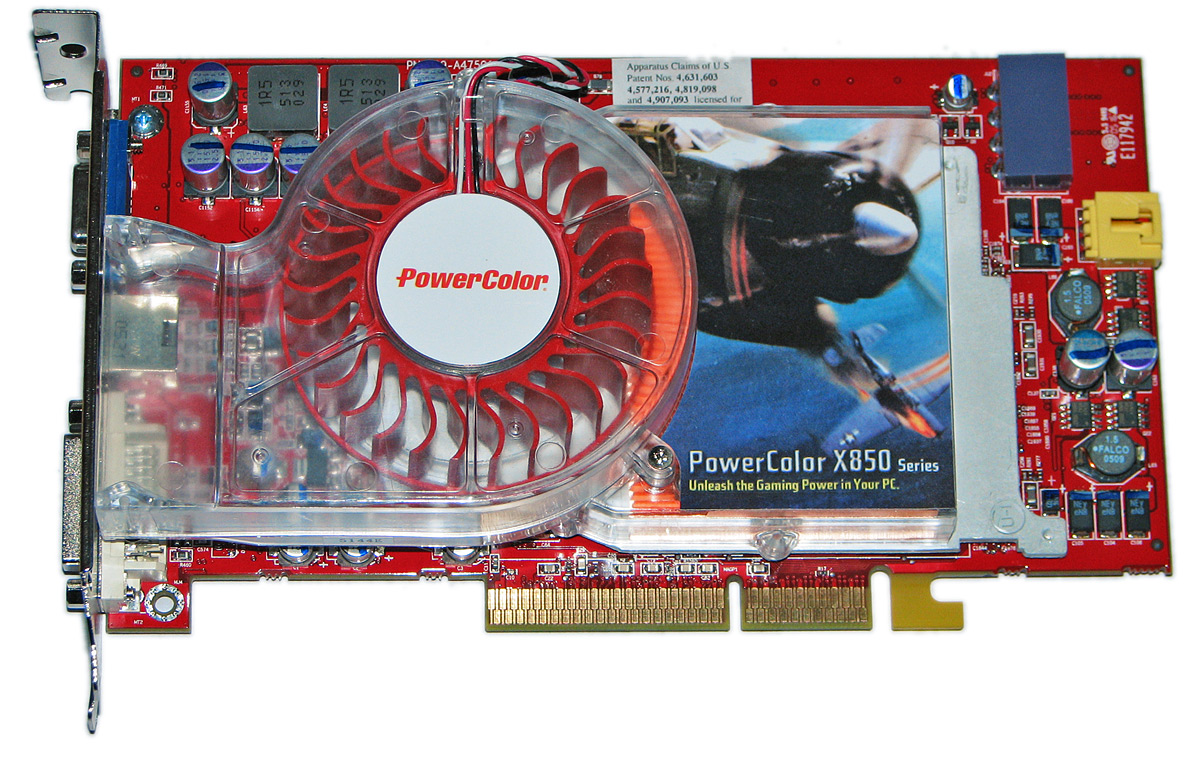
PowerColor Radeon X850XT Platinum Edition

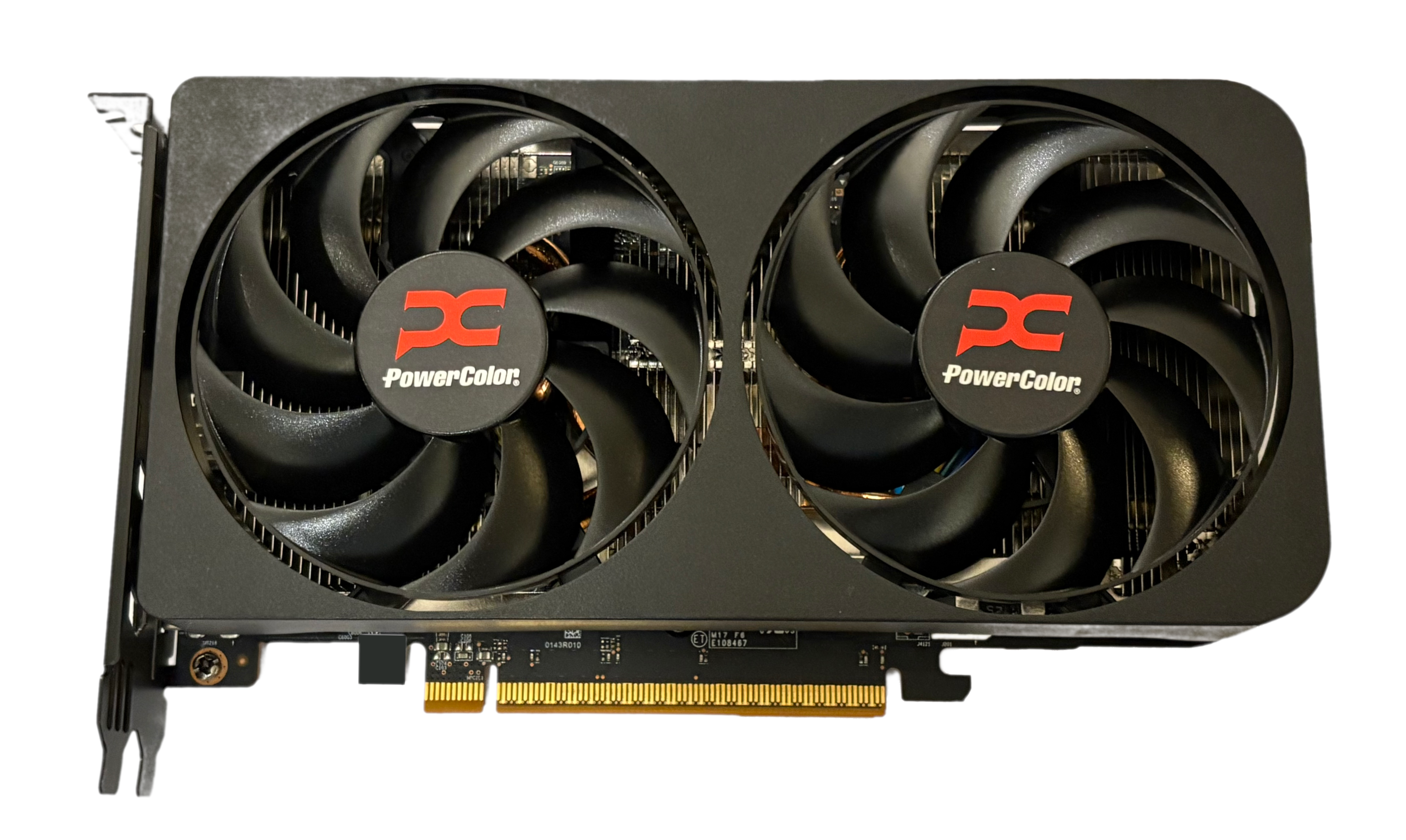
PowerColor Radeon RX 9060 XT

PowerColor is a licensed producer of AMD Radeon video cards. The majority of PowerColor cards are manufactured by Foxconn.

PowerColor's AMD video cards range from affordable cards appropriate for low-end workstations, to cards for high-end gaming machines, thus catering to a wide range of the market. PowerColor's manufacturing arrangement with FoxConn has given it the ability to change the specifications of cards, allowing them to announce products with higher specifications—overclocked by default—than AMD or its main competitor, Sapphire Technology.

PowerColor products have been widely reviewed and have gained a number of awards at computer hardware review sites.

== Support ==
PowerColor provides a two-year warranty on its products. To return a video card, the end-user must sign in and register their card. The return process is available only to end users in North America, with the customer liable for shipping.

== See also ==
- Diamond Multimedia – for North and South American markets
