= Once-a-month cooking =

The concept of once-a-month cooking (OAMC) is to spend a set amount of time cooking with an end result of having enough meals to last through the whole month. OAMC recipes usually involve freezing the meals until needed (termed freezer cooking).

== Advantages ==
The primary advantage to this method of cooking is to save time over the course of the month by preparing meals ahead of time in one big cooking day. Preparation time for each meal is then cut down to reheating time only.

This method also allows the home cook to save money by purchasing food items in bulk and taking advantage of sales at the market. Money is also saved on the family budget by having homemade convenience foods which can cut down on the frequency of fast food purchases or home dinner deliveries.

Cooking ahead for the freezer can be a healthier alternative to purchasing prepackaged frozen meals at the grocery store, allowing the cook to choose wholesome ingredients and cater to individual food needs (allergies, sensitivities, etc.).

== Storage and quality ==
One of the main challenges of once-a-month cooking is maintaining food texture and flavor over several weeks of storage. To prevent freezer burn and nutrient loss, proper packaging techniques are essential. This often involves cooling foods completely before freezing and using airtight containers or vacuum sealing systems to minimize exposure to oxygen during the storage period.

== See also ==
- Frozen food
- Meal preparation
