= Sapphire Technology =

Technology company in Hong Kong

Sapphire Technology Limited
- Native name: 藍寶科技
- Company type: Private
- Industry: Computer hardware
- Founded: 2001; 25 years ago
- Headquarters: Sha Tin New Town, Hong Kong
- Area served: Worldwide
- Products: Computer hardware
- Number of employees: 105+ (2018)
- Website: www.sapphiretech.com

Sapphire Technology Limited (Chinese: 藍寶科技) is a Hong Kong–based technology company, which produces video cards for personal computers and workstations, motherboards, TV tuner cards, digital audio players and LCDTVs

Founded in 2001, Sapphire's products are based on ATI/AMD GPUs, and both ATI/AMD and Intel motherboard chipset technology. The company is the largest supplier of AMD-based video cards in the world.

Sapphire was the first company to release a video card with a HDMI connector.

Sapphire was the first company to release a video card having clock speed of 1000 MHz (1 GHz) with the release of the Sapphire Atomic Edition HD 4890.

== Manufacturing facilities ==
As of 2007, Sapphire has two ISO 9001 and ISO 14001-certified manufacturing facilities in Dongguan, China, which have a monthly production capacity of 1.8 million video cards. The manufacturing facility had an area of about 250,000 m^{2} used by 16 independent production lines as of May 2005.

=== Manufacturing process ===
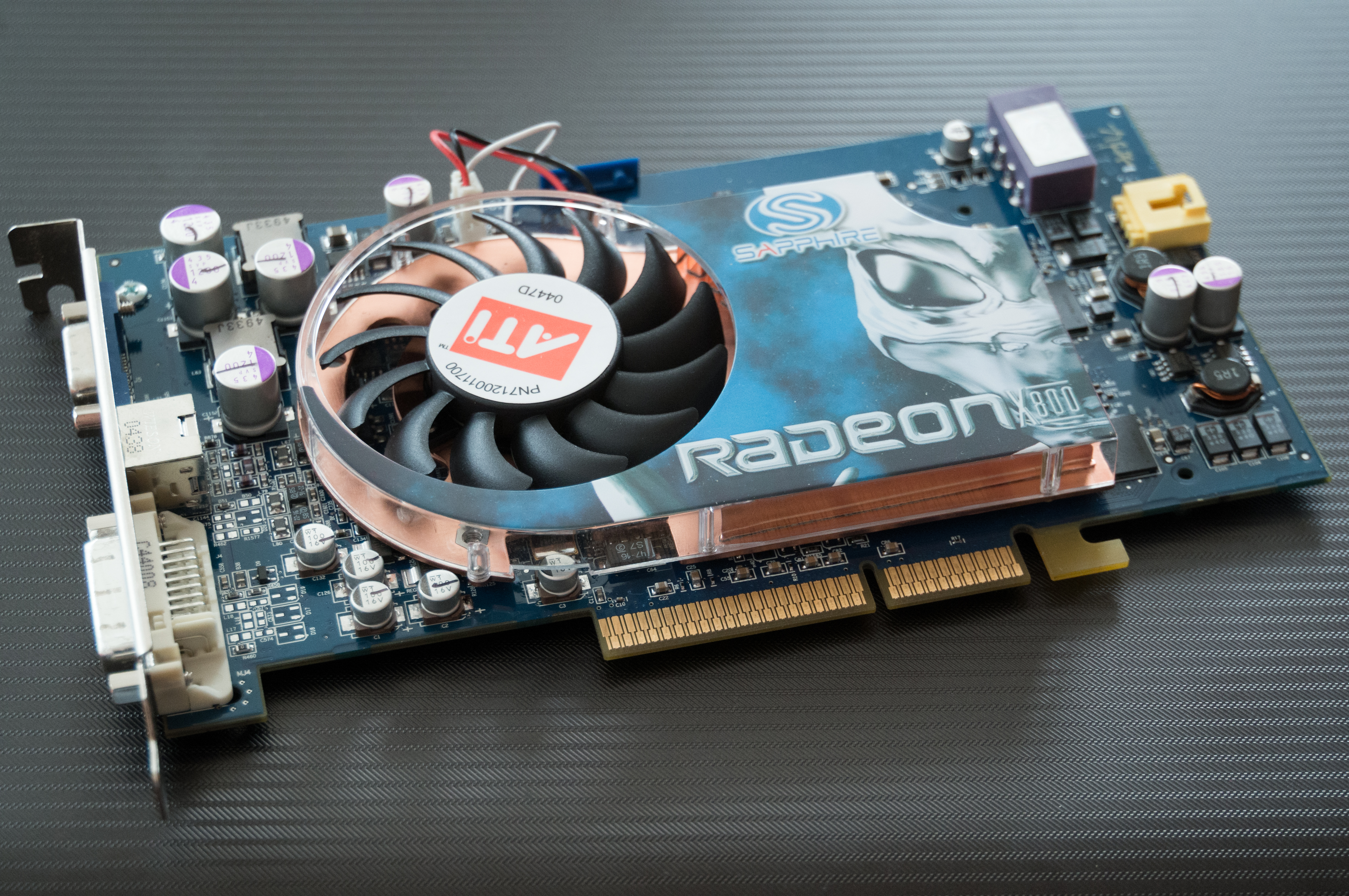
A Sapphire Radeon X800 Pro

Sapphire buys PCBs from an external contractor, but they place components on the PCB and reflow them in their own factories. AMD GPUs have historically been used in their products.

== Gallery ==
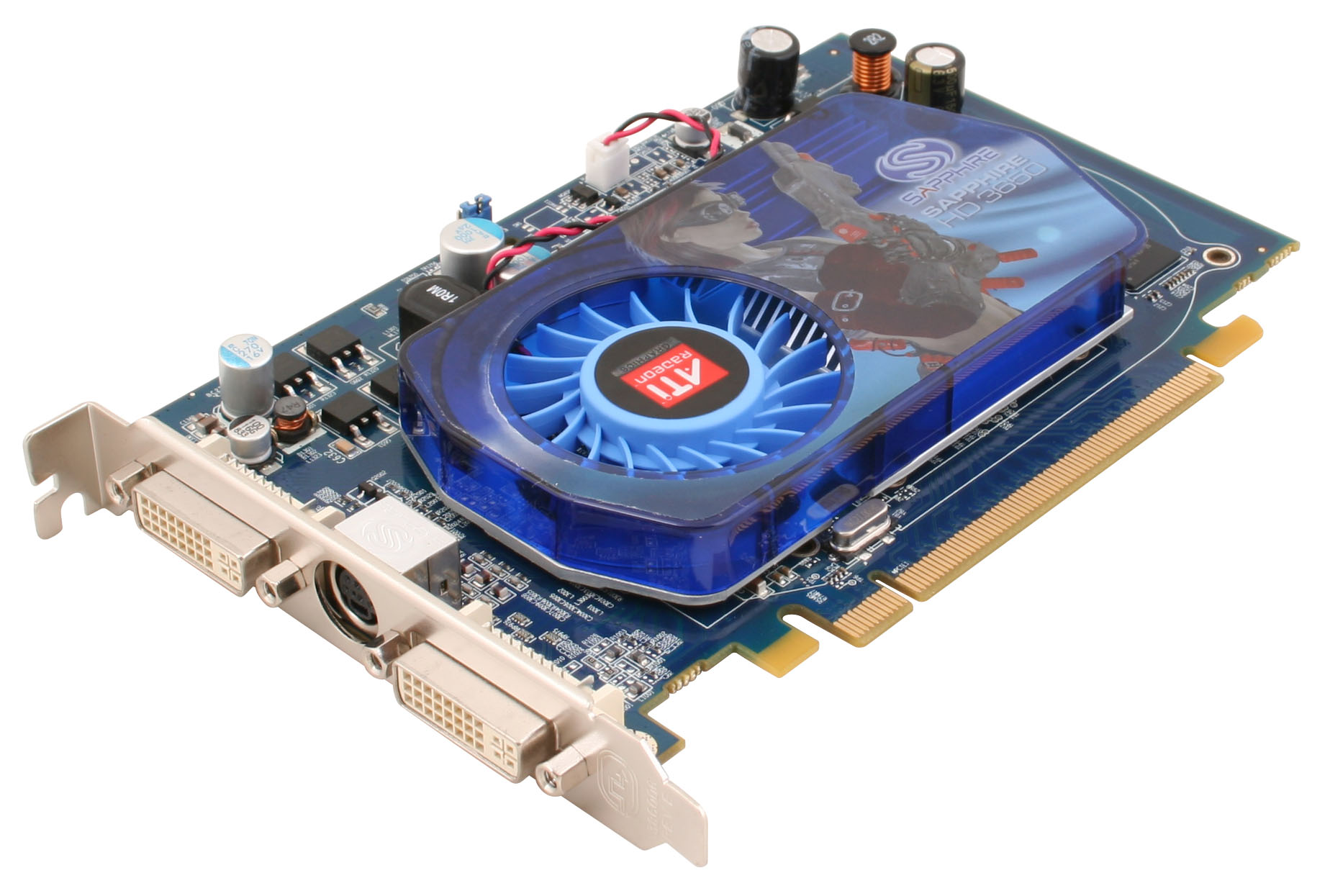
Radeon HD 3650

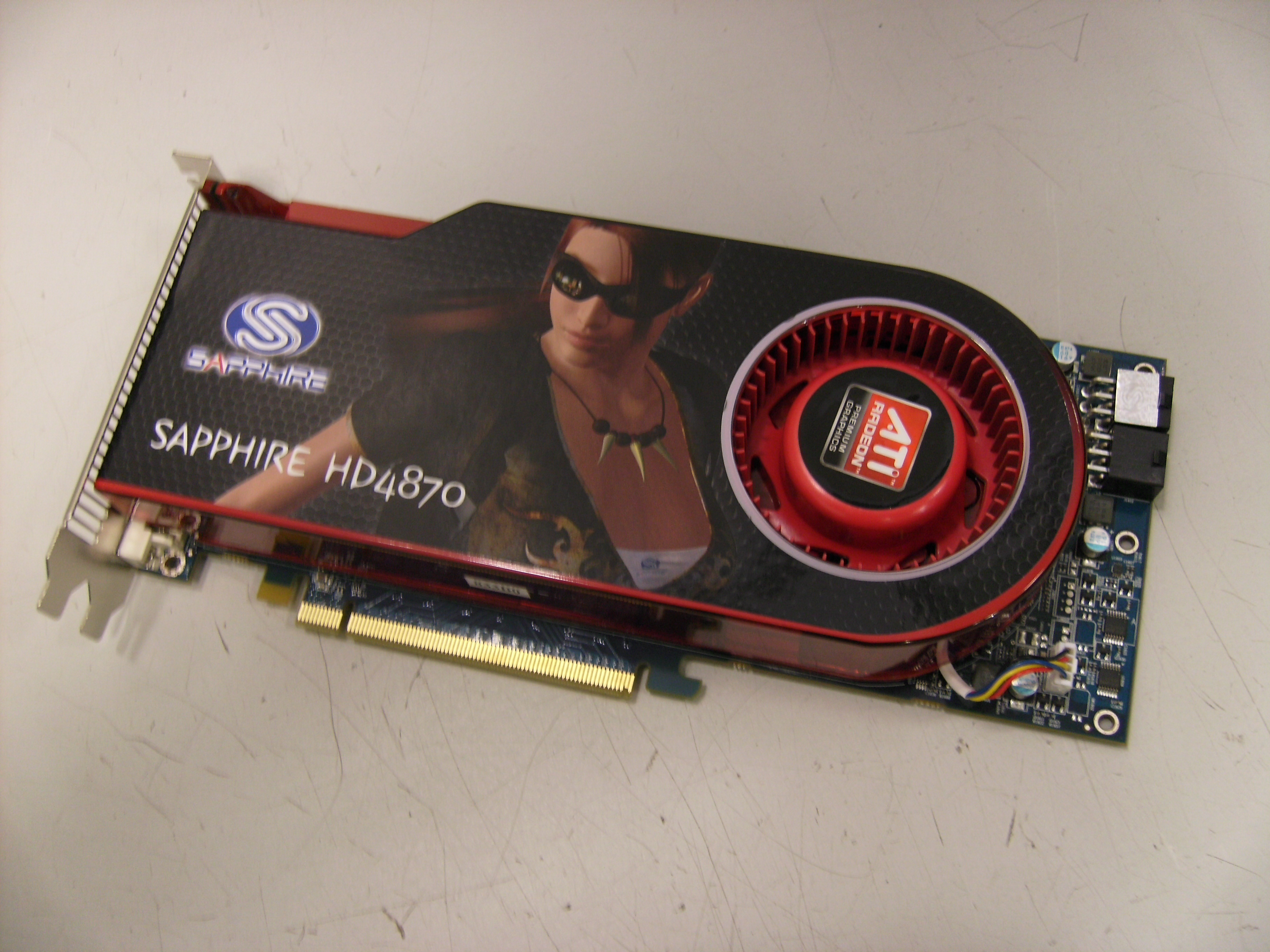
Radeon HD 4870

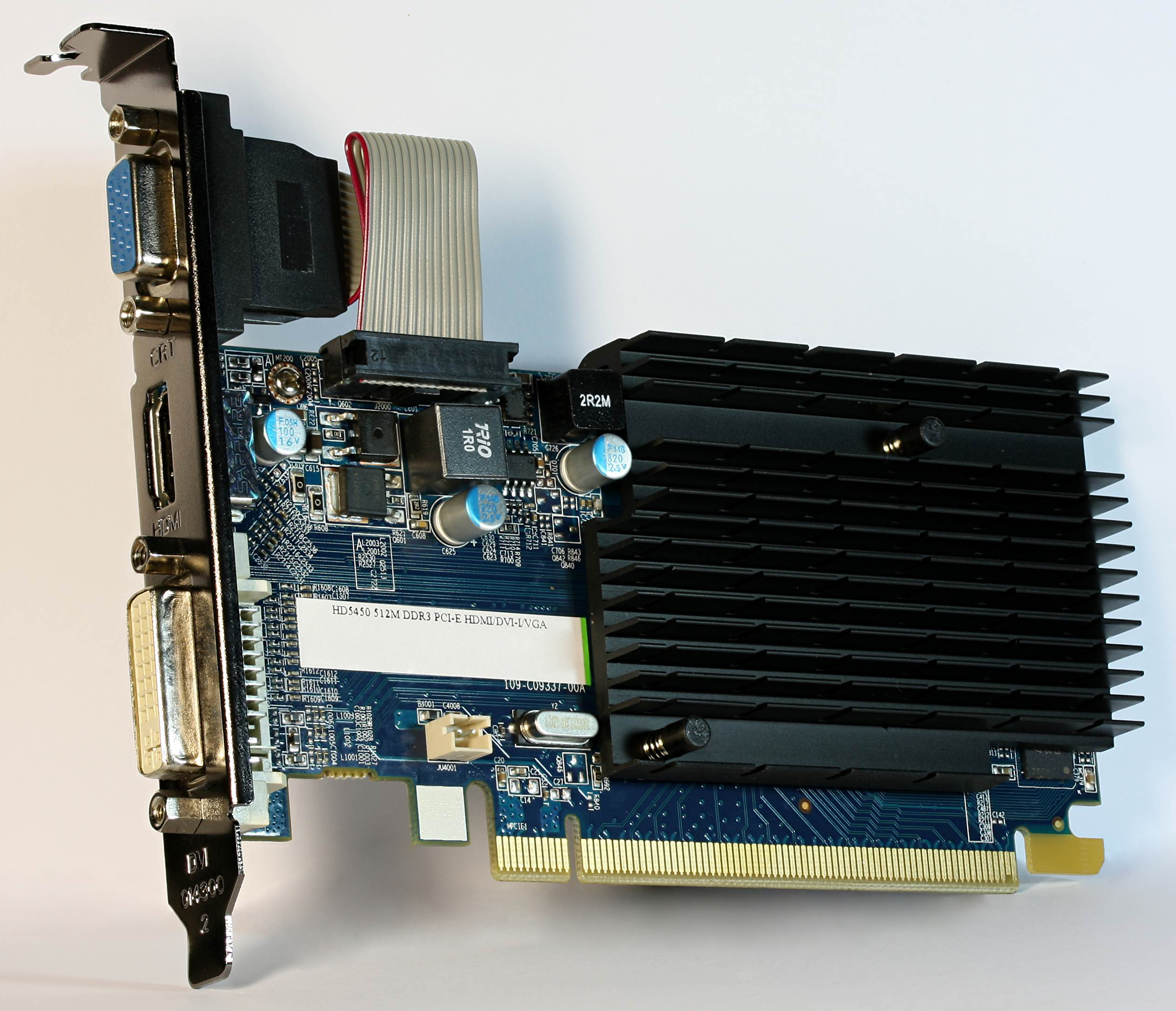
Radeon HD 5450

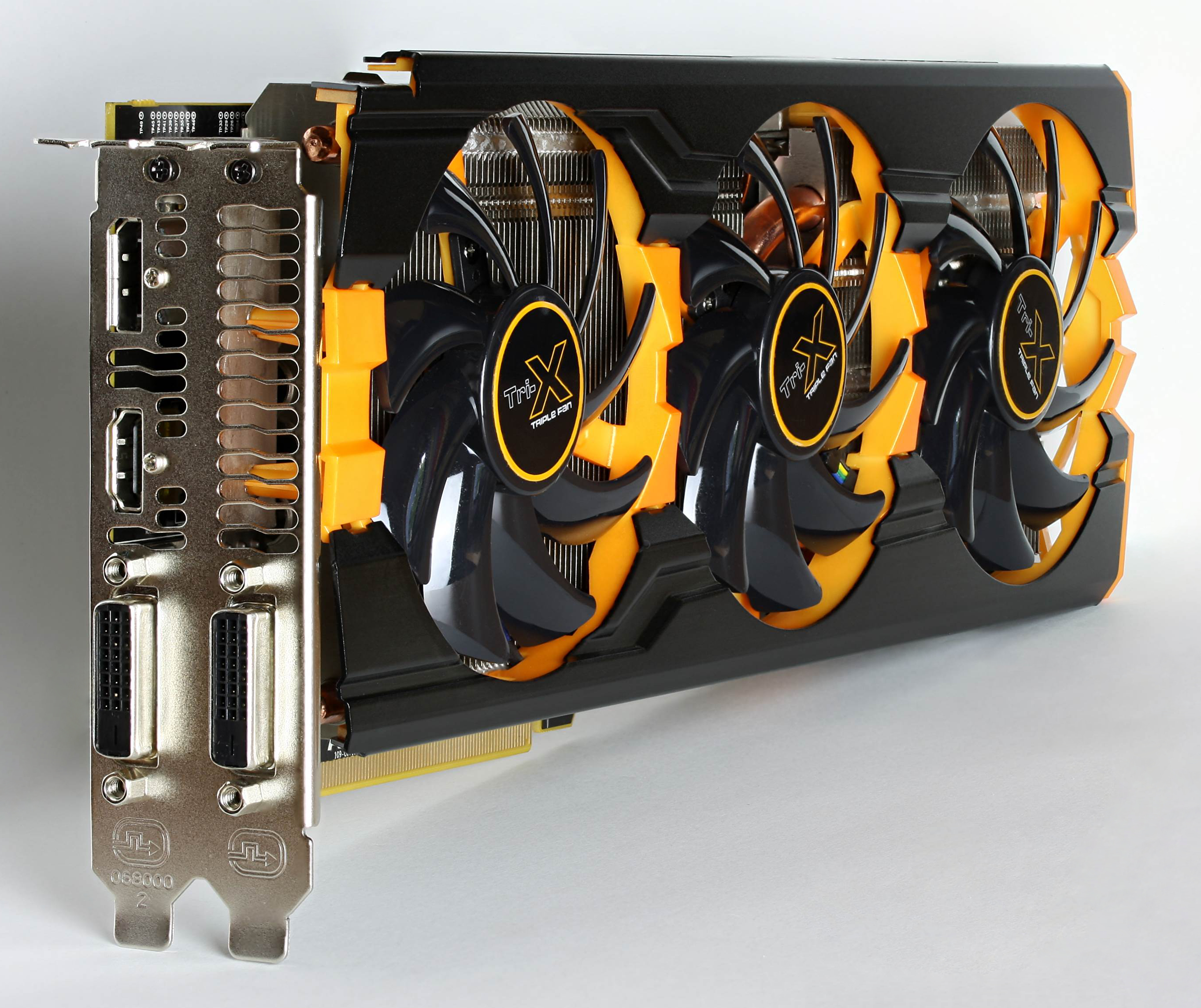
Radeon R9 290X
