= Dopping cement =

Thermal adhesive used by gem cutters

Dopping cement, dopping wax, or faceting wax is a thermal adhesive used by gem cutters to secure ("dop") a gemstone to a wooden or metal holder ("dopstick", "Tounded stick") for grinding and lapping. Setters cement is a similar material used to secure a gemstone while setting or polishing.

Dopping cement is usually formulated so that it is hard at room temperature, but soft and moldable like putty at 45-65 °C, when it can still be shaped with the fingers. The cement is commercially sold as sticks or flat slabs.

With metal dopsticks, a low-melting tin-lead solder can be used for that purpose, instead of a dopping cement.

== Use ==
In typical use, a small amount of cement is melted from the tip of a cement stick or from the edge of a cement slab by holding it over an alcohol lamp or similar source of heat.

The tip of the dopstick is dipped into the molten cement, which is allowed to cool until it has the consistency of putty. The stone too is separately warmed up to about the same temperature. Then the dopstick is pressed down over the stone, and the cement is pressed with the fingers so as to tightly enclose it, except for the part that is to be ground or polished.

Alternatively, the stone may be warmed up to that temperature, and a few drops of molten cement can be dropped over it. The dopstick is then placed over the stone, and the cement is pressed around it.

The stone can be removed from the dopstick by warming the cement again. Alternatively, the cement can be further cooled with cold water, so that it becomes brittle, and then the stone is pried out with a knife.

== Composition ==
Dopping cement can be made from several materials, including

- Shellac
- Chasers pitch
- Sealing wax
- Beeswax

Commercial cements may have other formulations.

Formulations with higher melting point, like 65-75 °C, tend to be harder at room temperature and thus hold the stone more firmly. However, they may be too hot to mold with bare fingers; and some gemstones (like opal and turquoise) are easily damaged by heat.

== See also ==
- Chasers pitch, used to hold metal plates for repoussé and chasing, embossing.
