= Patent fuel =

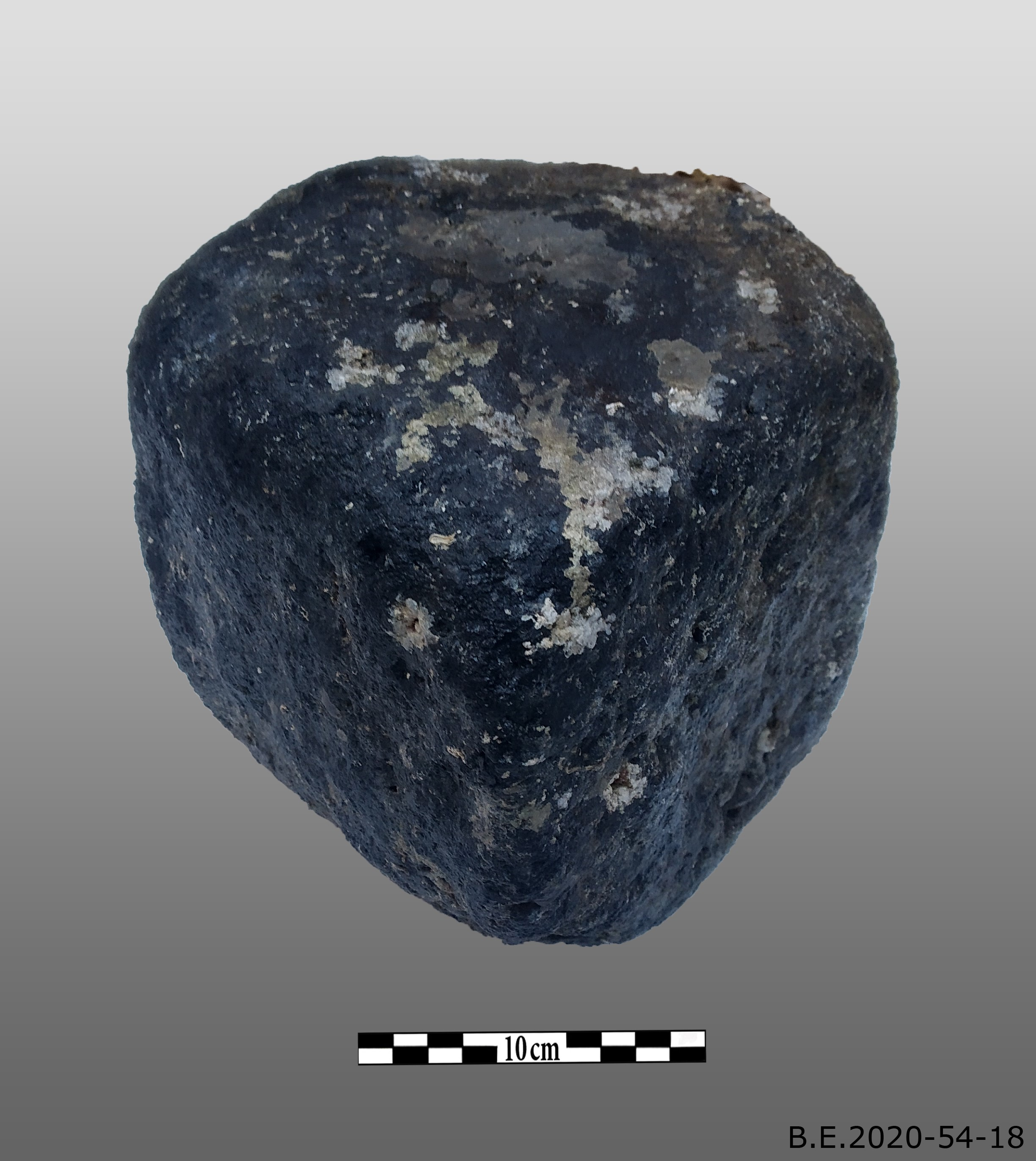
A corroded Patent Fuel cube

Patent fuel was a 19th-century artificial fuel made in Cardiff and Swansea in Wales by mixing in a hydraulic press coal and binding substances, like pitch. There were many factories producing this product with the same recipe, thus the only way of identifying them is their shape and imprinted logos. The most well-known patent fuel factories were the Star Patent fuel Co., the Crown Patent fuel, the Cardiff Patent fuel etc. In the late nineteenth century and early twentieth century, south Wales was the main exporter of patent fuel in the world, with around three million tons a year being exported each year in the first decade of the twentieth century. Patent Fuel cubes are exhibited at the National Museum of Wales in UK.

== Shapes and dimensions ==
The shape adopted generally in Cardiff was a rectangular block varying only in dimensions. The fact that practically the whole output was exported influenced the design of the block, as this form lent itself to easy and economical stowage and storage, and the rubbing surfaces exposed were small in proportion to the cubical contents. The blocks manufactured varied from 9 to 26 lbs. in weight, and no definite standard of weight appears to be required by consumers, although modern practice inclines if anything towards the production of larger sizes.

== Usage ==
The cubes were meant for industrial, military use or even expeditions. They were mostly used for the power needs of both battleships steamers and merchant steamers all around the world or for railways. Remains of this widely used product can be found mostly at the bottom of the sea like at the shipwrecks of Skaala a Norwegian steamer South from Bolt Head, of steamer Eleni, although it's yet to be confirmed, at Kasos' island, at Cardiff's port and at the remains of the expeditions in Antarctica.

== History of Production ==
Coal was first brought into use in London about 1300, and owing to the high price of wood it rapidly came into general use. The smoke given off, on account of its imperfect combustion, became the subject of agitation in the time of Edward I, and again during the reign of Queen Elizabeth, when Proclamations were issued prohibiting the use of coal in London when Parliament was in Session. In 1306 a Royal Proclamation was issued prohibiting artificers from using coal in their furnaces upon the pains of punishment of great fines and ransoms for the first offence.

In December 1799, John Frederick Chabannes was granted a patent for the manufacture of patent fuel, consisting of great and small coals mixed together which were usually bought in the pool in the River Thames for consumption in the cities of London and Westminster and their environs. The composition consisted of small coals and a small quantity of earth, clay, cow-dung, tar, pitch, broken glass, sulphur, sawdust, oil-cakes, tan, or wood, mixed together and moulded into bricks or balls. This better and last recipe was practically dirt-free and smokeless.

Patent fuel was the second most popular exported product in Wales. During 1913 Wales exported 746,000 tons of iron and 714,000 tons of Patent fuel. This popularity was due to its resistance in very hot or very cold climates. With coals varying from the Bituminous seams of Monmouthshire, containing up to 35 per cent., to the Anthracite seams of Carmarthenshire, having 5 per cent, of volatile matter, the blending can be adapted to a variety of conditions. Chief consumers were America, French, Italy and Spanish railway and steamship companies.

== Process of manufacture ==
For the needs of patent fuel production two coalfield sections at South Wales were used: the first section consisted of the counties of Monmouth and East Glamorgan with Cardiff as the chief outlet port and the western section with the Counties of Glamorgan, Carmarthen, Brecon and Pembroke with Swansea as the natural outlet. The first section produced mostly smokeless steam coal while the second section produced mostly Anthracite, although considerable quantities of Bituminous coal existed.

The process of manufacture varied only in minor details, and shortly stated it is as follows:

(a) In works where washeries were installed, the coals were delivered from railway trucks into receiving bins and were elevated to the washeries, and after being freed from impurities were graded into nuts, beans, and fines. The former were loaded direct into railway wagons for sale, whilst the fines were passed to driers for reducing the moisture content to about 3 per cent., and were then conducted into bins.

(b) Pitch was delivered into a cracker, and then to a disintegrator, and afterwards was automatically delivered on to a conveyor in measured quantities, where it was joined by the fines drawn from bins.

(c) The mixture was then passed into disintegrators for reducing the sizes and thoroughly mixing the coal and pitch.

{d) Elevators then conveyed the prepared material to pugheaters heated by superheated steam, where the fusion of the pitch was effected and the mixture became agglomerated in a plastic state.

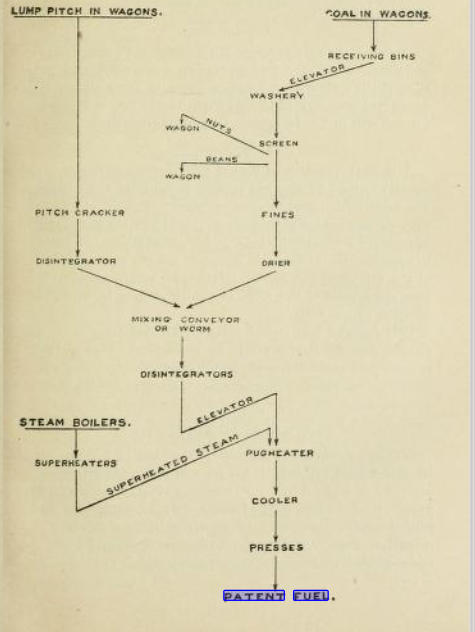
Patent Fuel steps of production

(e) The agglomeration was then partially cooled, afterwards entered the moulds and was finally mechanically pressed and then delivered by bands for cooling and hardening on to trolleys or storage dumps.

== Calorific values ==
Its calorific value was somewhat higher than that of the coal used in its construction, and it had the additional advantages of compactness and ability to withstand weathering and rough handling. The material was practically smokeless, and yield about 14,000 British thermal units per Ib. In comparison with coal, it was lasting more than twice as long and was giving off much greater heat. Differences, however in calorific values can be found depending on the type of the coal used for its production. If the coal used was Bituminous coal it had less calorific values than Anthracite.

== Crown Patent Fuel ==
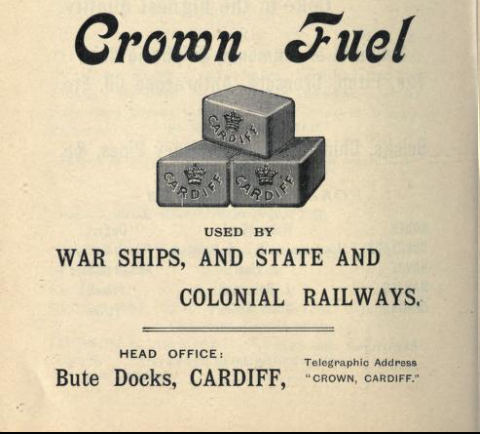
Commersial of Crown Patent Fuel

The first patent fuel works in Cardiff, Crown Works, was established in 1857 with variations in ownership throughout the years. The factory continued the production until 1964 but not in the name ‘Crown’.

== Anchor Patent Fuel ==
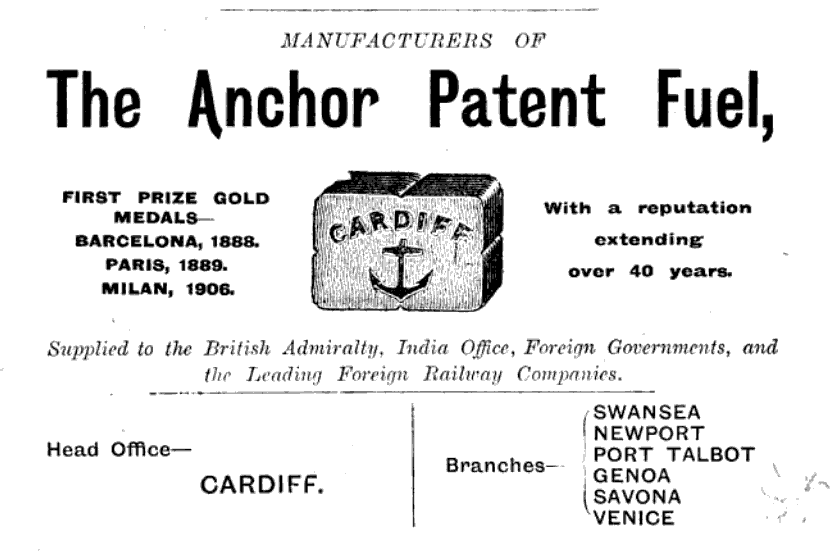
Commersial of Anchor Patent Fuel

The second in the Cardiff fuel works, the Anchor Patent Fuel Works Ltd., was opened about 1866.

== Star Patent Fuel ==
The Star works was founded in 1874 by Thomas Edward Heath and his partner Tom Evens, and located on the site of the former Maindy ironworks of Isaac Russell. Heath introduced a number of improvements which facilitated production and material handling. Blocks were of regular shape and were neatly stacked on the company's wharf ready for shipping by barge on the Glamorganshire Canal to Bute Dock. The Works prospered from the start and in 1887 a limited company was formed. The most popular form of patent fuel for domestic purposes is of the egg-shaped or " ovoid " variety. The word "ovoid" or "ovoidal".
