= Lapidary =

Shaping of gemstones for jewelry

Examples of lapidary products
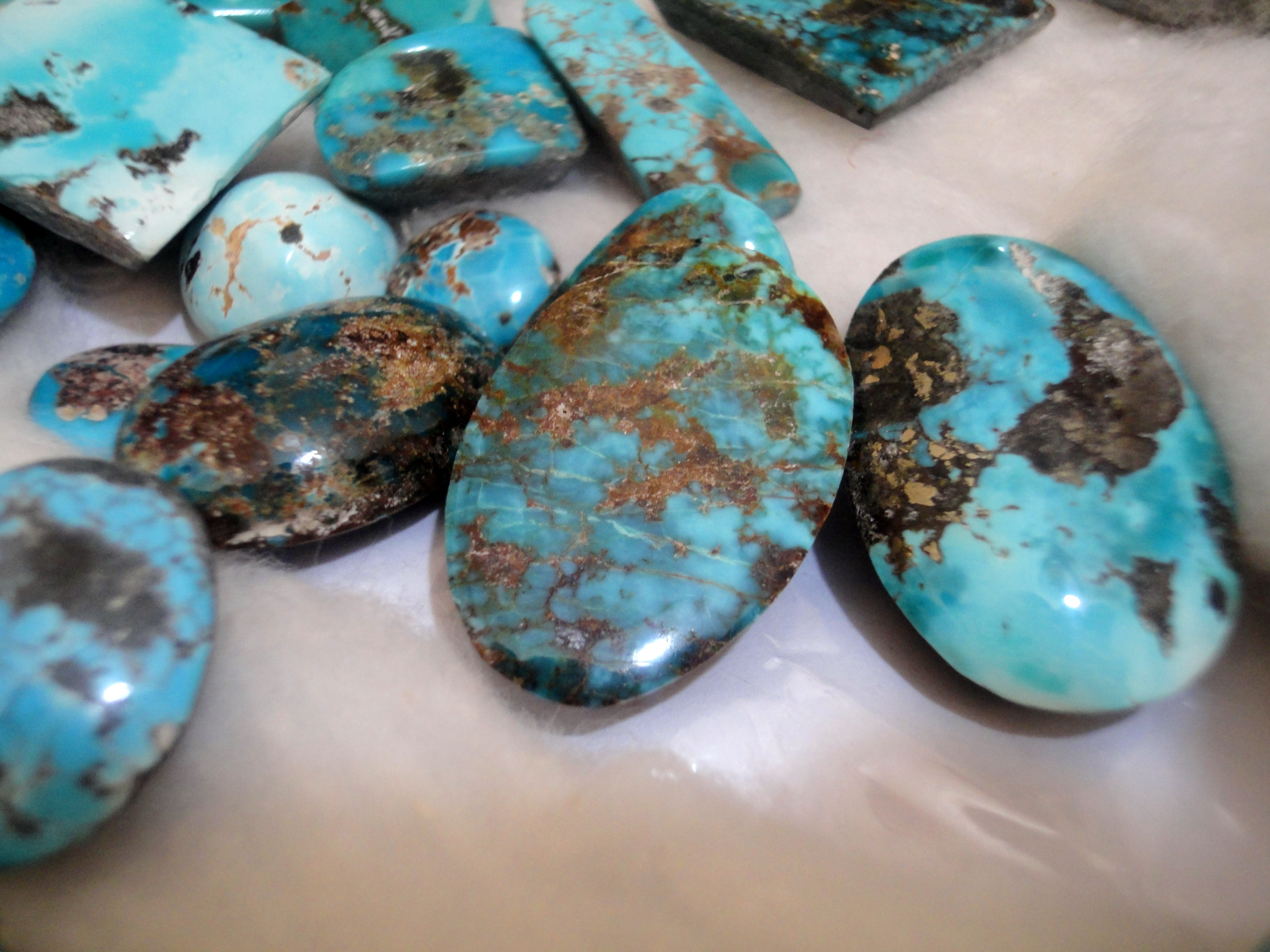
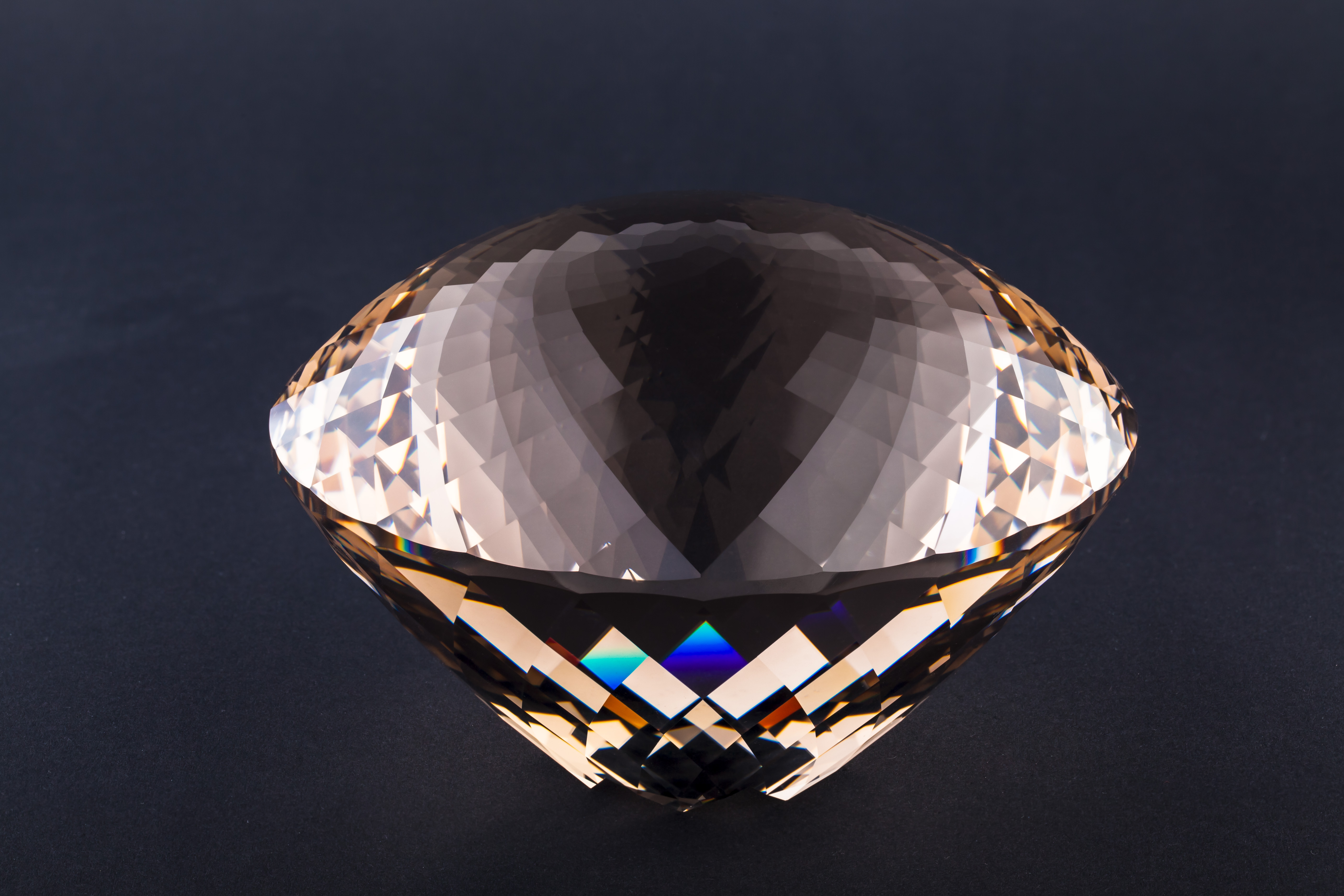
Turquoise cabochons and a faceted citrine

Lapidary (from Latin lapidarius 'stone, stony') is the practice of shaping stone, minerals, or gemstones into decorative items such as cabochons, engraved gems (including cameos), and faceted designs. A person who practices lapidary techniques of cutting, grinding, and polishing is known as a lapidary or lapidarist. Hardstone carving requires specialized carving techniques.

In modern contexts, a gemcutter is a person who specializes in cutting diamonds, but in older contexts the term refers to artists who produced hardstone carvings; engraved gems such as jade carvings, a branch of miniature sculpture or ornament in gemstone.

By extension, the term lapidary has sometimes been applied to collectors of and dealers in gems, or to anyone who is knowledgeable in precious stones.

== Etymology ==
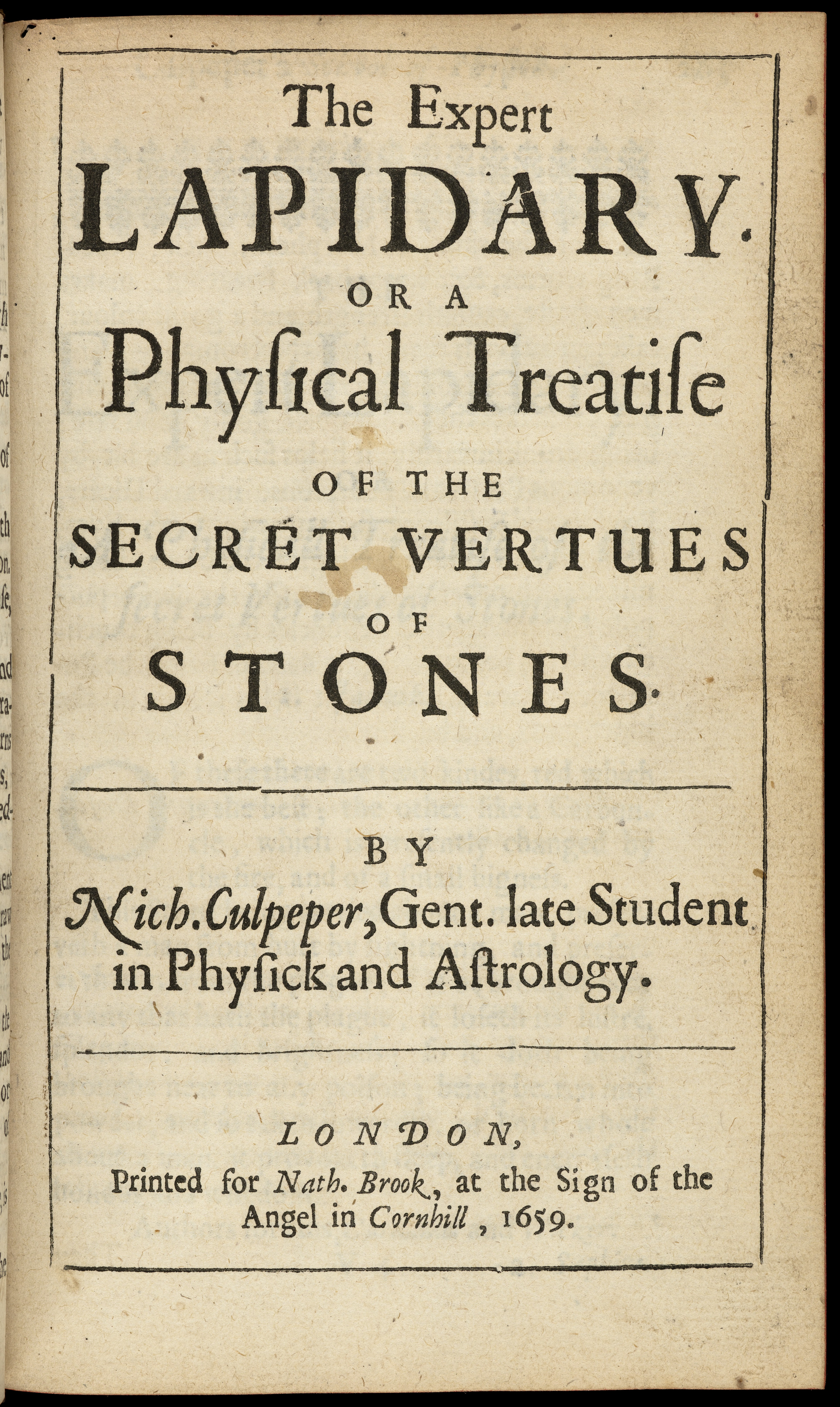
A 17th-century English lapidary text

The etymological root of the word lapidary is the Latin word lapis, meaning "stone". In the 14th century, the term evolved from lapidarius, meaning 'stonecutter' or 'working with stone', into the Old French word lapidaire, meaning 'one skilled in working with precious stones'.

In French, and later English, the term is also used for a lapidary text, which was a treatise on precious stones that details their appearance, formation, and properties—particularly in terms of the powers believed to be held by some stones—as believed in medieval Europe. The beliefs about the powers of stones included their ability to prevent harm, heal ailments, or offer health benefits. Lapidary appeared as an English adjective in the 18th century.

== History ==
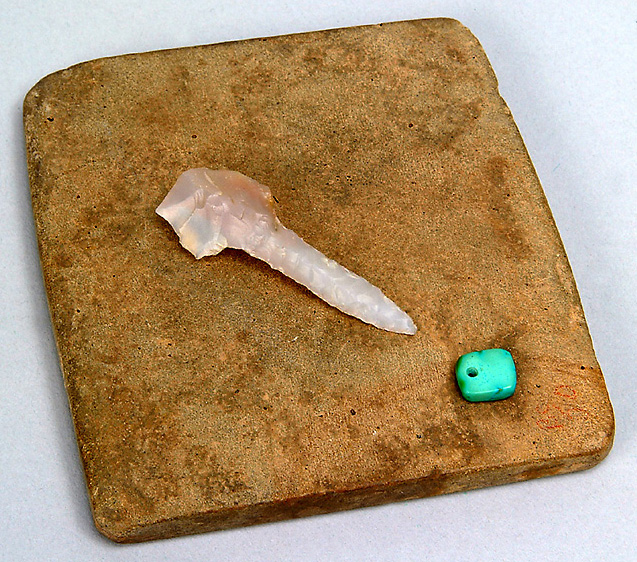
Lapidary tool kit from around 900 AD, Chaco Culture National Historical Park

The earliest known lapidary work likely occurred during the Stone Age. As people created tools from stone, they realized that some geological materials were harder than others. The next earliest documented examples of what could be considered lapidary arts came in the form of drilling stone and rock. The earliest roots of drilling rocks date back to approximately one million years ago.

The early Egyptians developed cutting and jewelry fashioning methods for lapis lazuli, turquoise, and amethyst.

The art of lapidary was relatively well-developed in the Indian subcontinent by the early 1st millennium CE. The surviving manuscripts of the 3rd century Buddhist text Rathanpariksha by Buddha Bhatta, and several Hindu texts of mid-1st millennium CE such as Agni Purana and Agastimata, are Sanskrit treatises on lapidary arts. They discuss sources of gems and diamonds, their origins, qualities, testing, cutting and polishing, and making jewelry from them. Several other Sanskrit texts on gems and lapidary arts have been dated to post-10th century, suggesting a continuous lapidary practice.

According to Jason Hawkes and Stephanie Wynne-Jones, archaeological evidence suggests that trade in lapidary products between Africa and India was established in the 1st millennium CE. People of the Deccan region of India and those near the coast of East Africa had innovated their own techniques for lapidary before the 10th century, as evidenced by excavations and Indian and non-Indian texts dated to that period.

Lapidary was also a significant tradition in early Mesoamerica. The lapidary products were used as status symbols, for offerings, and during burials. They were made from shell, jade, turquoise, and greenstones. Aztec lapidarists used string saws and drills made of reed and bone as their lapidary tools.

=== Medieval lapidaries ===
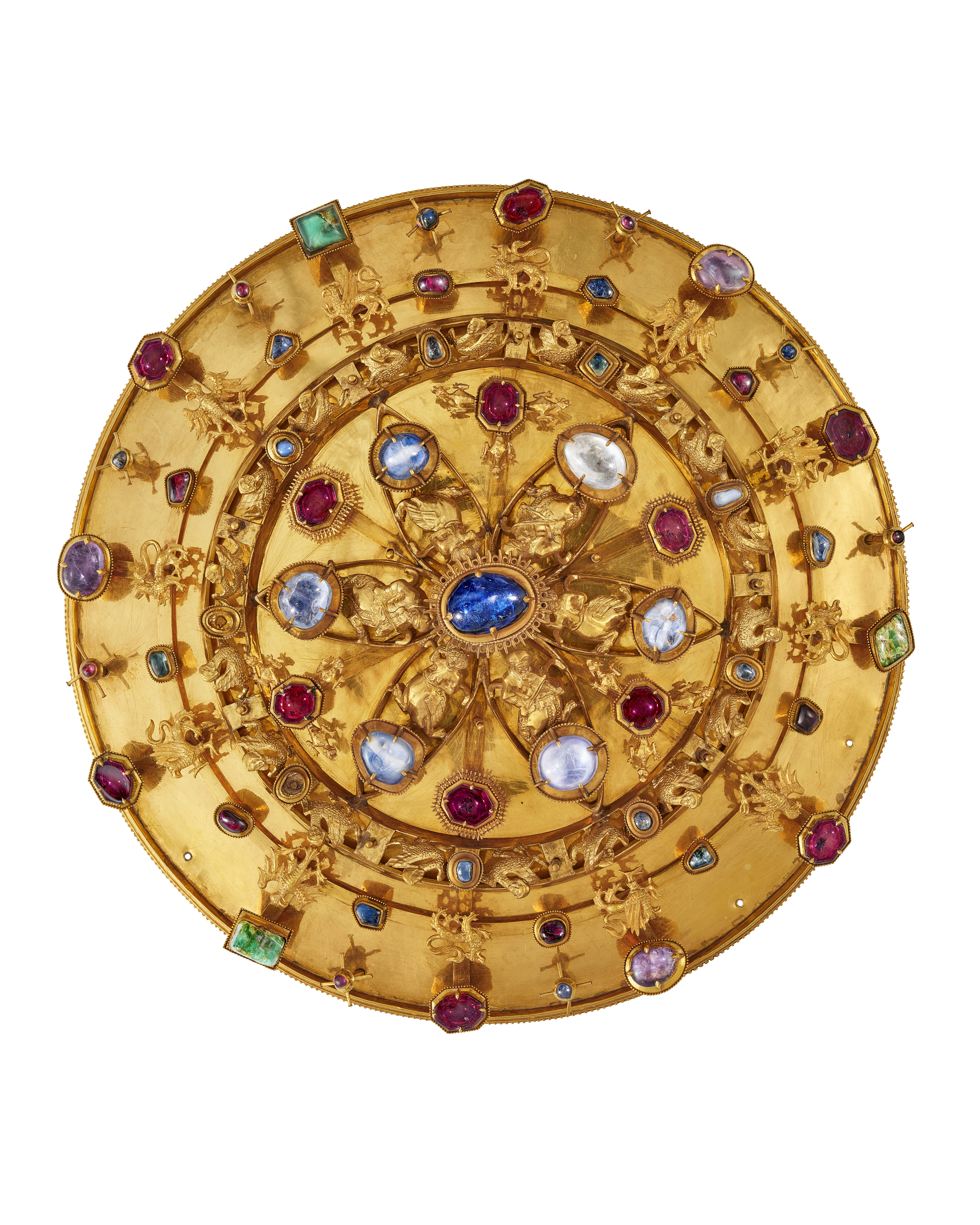
The Motala Clasp, a 14th century gold clasp set with multiple stones of different cuts. Probably made in France and found by a fisherman in Motala river, Sweden.

The history of lapidaries can be traced back to the classical world, where writers like Theophrastus and Pliny the Elder laid the foundations for later medieval interpretations of gemstones. In his examination of lyngurium—a mythical gemstone described by Theophrastus—Steven A. Walton discusses how classical knowledge was transmitted and adapted in medieval lapidary traditions. Despite the mythical nature of some of these stones, medieval lapidaries continued to draw on classical sources, blending scientific knowledge with magical beliefs. Walton highlights how these texts cataloged stones not only for their aesthetic and material properties but also for their purported magical and medicinal functions, making lapidaries sources essential for texts for both scholars and practitioners of natural philosophy during the medieval period.

In Anglo-Saxon England, lapidaries became particularly significant as both medical and religious guides. Peter Kitson traces the transmission of lapidary knowledge into early medieval England, emphasizing how these texts informed by Lapidaries functioned as practical manuals for physicians, clergy, and scholars. The Old English Lapidary, for instance, detailed the healing properties of stones, reflecting the belief that gemstones could cure illnesses and provide spiritual protection. Kitson argues that lapidaries in this period served a dual purpose: they were not only scientific texts that described natural phenomena but also moral and religious guides that connected material objects to divine forces.

Medieval lapidaries were deeply embedded in the practice of lithotherapy, the belief in the healing properties of stones. John M. Riddle’s analysis of lithotherapy in the Middle Ages emphasizes the medical role lapidaries played, particularly in guiding the use of gemstones for healing. These texts described how different stones, often categorized by color, composition, and astrological associations, could be used to treat specific ailments. Riddle points out that medieval lapidaries were not merely collections of folklore; they were often considered legitimate medical texts, consulted by physicians and healers to guide treatment practices.

The Peterborough Lapidary is another example of a medieval lapidary that reflects the blending of practical and mystical knowledge. As detailed in A Medieval Book of Magical Stones: The Peterborough Lapidary, this text catalogs various gemstones and their magical properties, emphasizing the belief that stones could influence human behavior, protect against harm, and even cure diseases. The Peterborough Lapidary demonstrates how lapidaries were used not only for healing but also for magical and protective purposes, reflecting the medieval understanding that the natural world was imbued with supernatural power.

Lapidaries also played an important role in medieval spirituality. Richard A. Beinert’s analysis of medieval piety and lapidary literature emphasizes how these texts reflected religious beliefs. Medieval Christians often associated gemstones with biblical figures, virtues, and divine forces. Lapidaries like the Peterborough Lapidary reinforced the idea that stones had sacred meanings, offering protection and spiritual benefits to those who used them correctly. Beinert suggests that these texts served as “windows on a medieval world” where natural objects were seen as manifestations of divine power, bridging the gap between the material and the spiritual.

Several notable examples of medieval lapidaries highlight their widespread use and cultural significance. The Lapidary of Sydrac, a 13th-century text, stands out for its inclusion of unusual lore about gemstones. William M. Holler notes that the Lapidary of Sydrac cataloged not only conventional healing properties of stones but also fantastical claims, such as stones that could grant invincibility or manipulate human emotions. This text reflects the broader medieval belief in the mystical powers of nature and the importance of lapidaries in transmitting both empirical knowledge and magical traditions.

In literary contexts, lapidary traditions also made their way into poetry. Tony Davenport’s analysis of the medieval poem Pearl reveals how the symbolic meanings of gemstones, as described in lapidaries, informed the poem’s themes of loss, beauty, and spiritual transcendence. Davenport suggests that the portrayal of jewels in Pearl draws on lapidary traditions to convey deeper religious and moral messages, illustrating how lapidary knowledge permeated not only scientific and medical texts but also literary and artistic works.

== Techniques ==
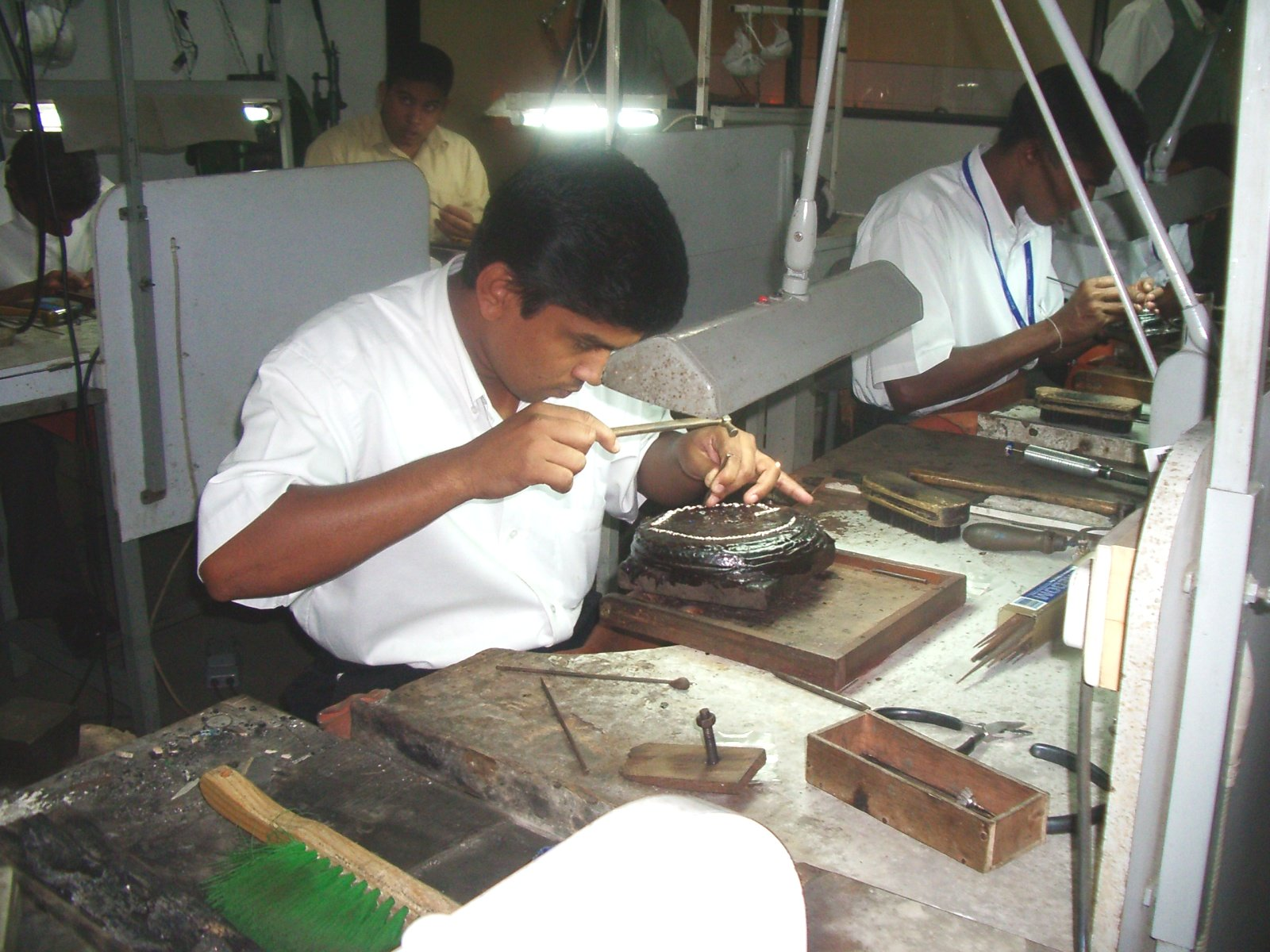
A jewellery worker in Sri Lanka

There are three broad categories of lapidary arts: tumbling, cabochon cutting, and faceting. Among a modern gemcutter's work are the following activities:

- Positioning rough stone in a holder, and holding the stone against the edge of a revolving saw or lapidary slitter impregnated with diamond dust to cut and slit stone.
- Removing cut stone and placing it in lapidary stick. A gemcutter then selects the shaping wheel and applies abrasive compound. They hold a lapidary stick against the revolving shaping wheel and lapidary disk to further shape stone and grind facets.
- Depositing stone within a barrel with both water and a grinding/polishing medium and either vibrating or rotating said barrel using friction to grind and polish the stones over time.
- Examining stone for accuracy of cut, using a magnifying glass. A gemcutter polishes stone, using felt or canvas-covered polishing wheel, and polishing compounds, such as tripoli or jeweler's rouge.
- Possibly using a mechanical facet-cutting device. A gemcutter may cut and polish diamonds for industrial purposes, and be designated as an industrial diamond polisher.
- The Mohs hardness scale is a commonly used tool in lapidary to help measure a mineral's scratch hardness. A mineral's scratch hardness is measured by seeing how easily scratched it is, and what other minerals on the Mohs hardness scale can scratch it. This tool is helpful in indicating what different lapidary methods should be used on the material.

=== Cutting ===
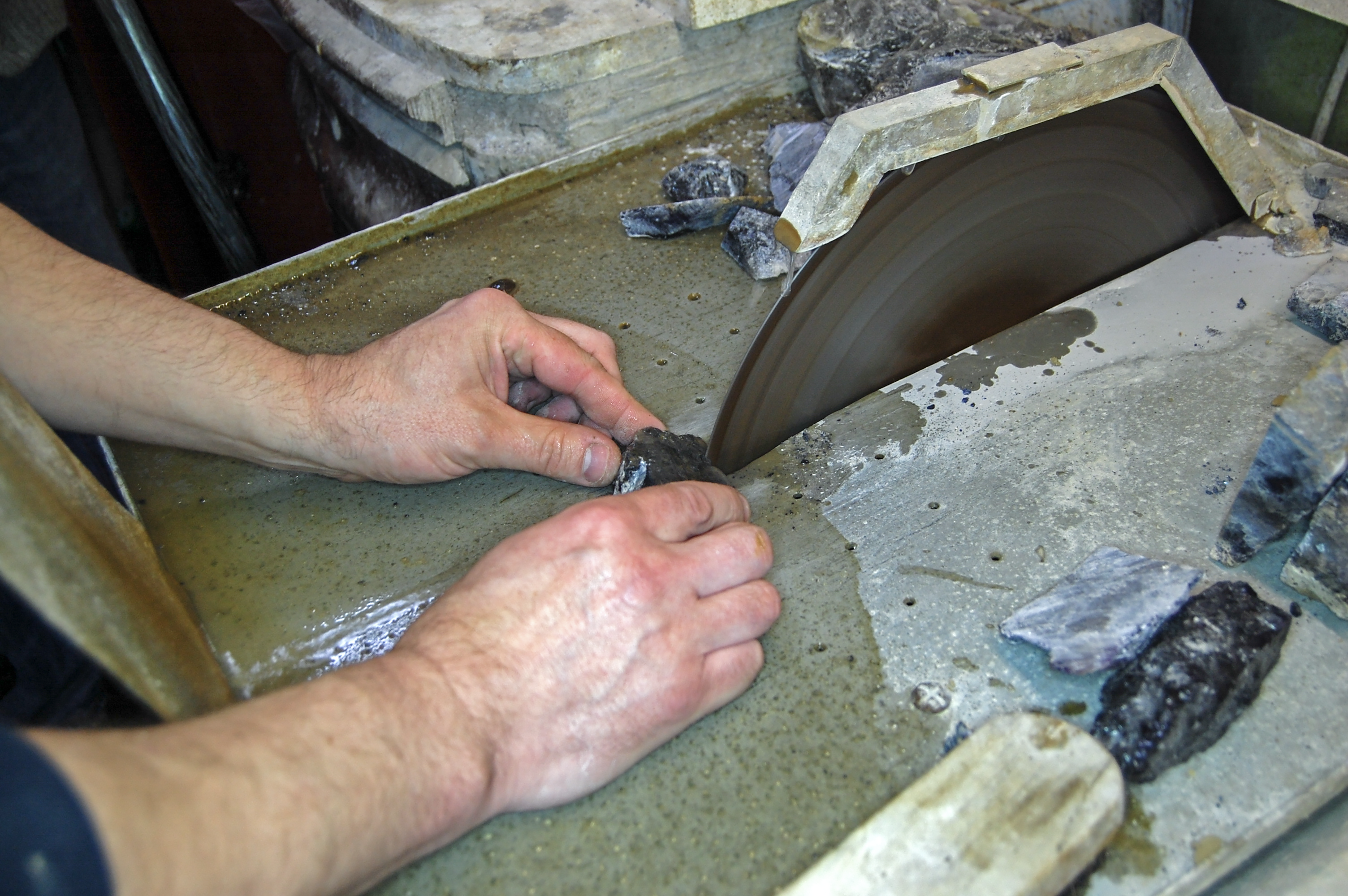
Using a diamond blade to saw a gemstone.

Cutting of harder stones is done with a diamond-edged saw. For softer materials, a medium other than diamond can be used, such as silicon carbide, garnet, emery, or corundum. Diamond cutting requires the use of diamond tools because of the extreme hardness of diamonds. The cutting, grinding, and polishing operations are usually lubricated with water, oil, or other liquids. Beyond these broader categories, there are other specialized forms of lapidary techniques, such as casting, carving, jewelry, and mosaics.

While the gemstone in the rough state may be trimmed to remove undesirable material or to separate it on a cleavage line with a diamond bladed saw, accurately described as cutting and once done by the use of a chisel or similar tool to simply break off pieces that were usable as single gemstones, the actual shaping and polishing of a gemstone is a grinding or sanding process. This grinding and sanding is done using a lap, a precision metal plate embedded with grit similar to the more familiar embedding of grit on paper. The lap is of high precision particularly for flatness and turned by a motor. The grit material is typically diamond or, occasionally, corundum, due to the supreme hardness of these materials. Only diamond is hard enough on the Mohs scale to shape and polish a diamond.

=== Faceting ===
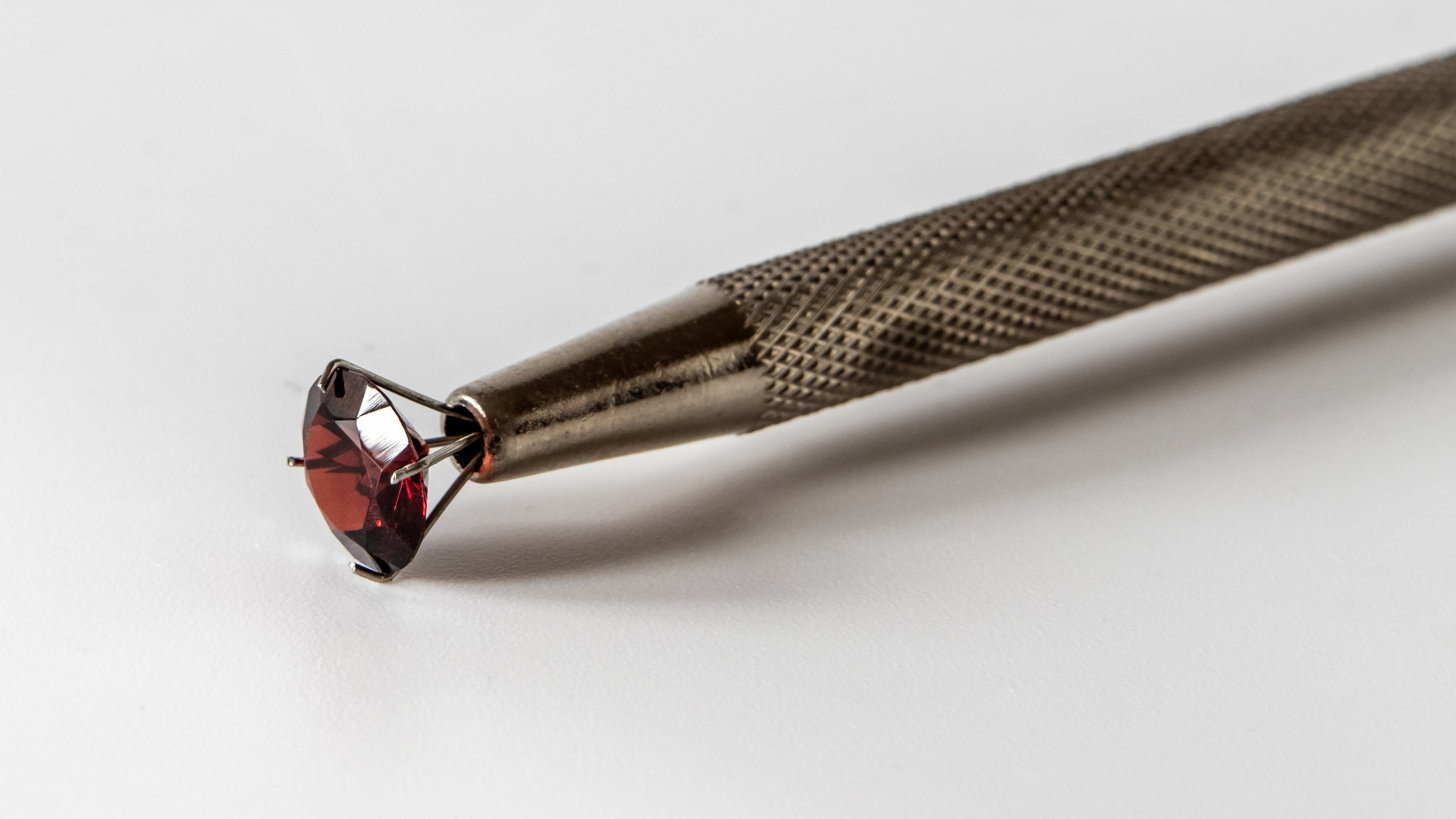
Four-pronged gemstone holder with a faceted garnet

A tsavorite preform fixed to a dop, mounted on a hand-held faceting handpiece with its index gear

Faceting requires equipment allowing for very precise adjustment of angle and location around the gemstone for facet-placement, a process sometimes referred to as indexing. The design may be computer-generated or left up to the skill and expertise of the individual cutting the gemstone.

During the process of grinding, faceting, and lapping, the gemstone is usually affixed ("dopped") to a rod (frequently referred to as a "dop" or "dopstick") made of wood, or perhaps brass or steel, with dopping cement, a specialized thermal adhesive. The dopstick can be hand-held or inserted into the indexing equipment for more precise faceting. A coolant then needs to be constantly applied to prevent softening of the cement. Diamonds, however, are held mechanically, or with low-melting point tin-lead solder, since the resultant heat generated by friction can be extreme, thus preventing the use of thermal adhesives.

Cabochons - smooth-shaped gemstones without facets such as jade or turquoise, and indeed most gemstones - are instead shaped and polished in much the same manner. They are usually left up to the skill and expertise of the individual cutting the gemstone and to similar equipment such as the lapping equipment.

=== Polishing ===
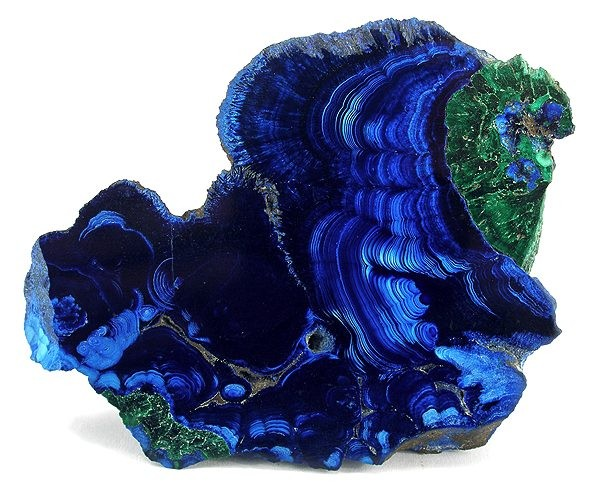
Polished Azurite-Malachite slab from Bisbee, Arizona. Rob Lavinsky wrote "It is so bright, it is almost electric."

Most modern lapidary work is done using motorized equipment. Polishing is done with resin- or metal-bonded emery, silicon carbide (carborundum), aluminium oxide (corundum), or diamond dust in successively decreasing particle sizes until a polish is achieved. In older systems, the grinding and polishing powders were applied separately to the grinding or buffing wheel. Often, the final polish will use a different medium such as tin oxide or cerium(IV) oxide.

The initial shaping and facet placement may be done using laps with grits of 220, 600, and/or 1200. The polishing step, however, requires grits of a much higher grade, such as 8,000, 14,000, 50,000 and even 100,000. This grit is also embedded into a metal lap, but sometimes applied manually to the lap during polishing.

=== Inlaying ===
Another specialized form of lapidary work is the inlaying of marble and gemstones into a marble matrix. This technique is known in English as pietra dura, for the hardstones that are used, like onyx, jasper and carnelian. In Florence and Naples, where the technique was developed in the 16th century, it is called opere di commessi. The Medici Chapel at San Lorenzo in Florence is completely veneered with inlaid hard stones. The specialty of micromosaics, which developed in the late-18th century in Naples and Rome, is sometimes covered under the umbrella term of lapidary work. In this technique, minute slivers of glass are assembled to create still life, cityscape views, and other images. In China, lapidary work specializing in jade carving has been continuous since at least the Shang dynasty.

== Safety ==
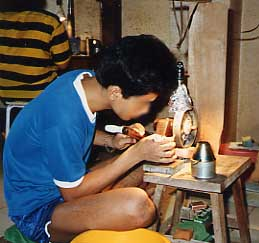
Gemcutting in Thailand

Stones can contain asbestos, silica, lead, talc, and other hazardous ingredients. The dust produced by lapidary techniques on such stones can cause health issues if inhaled. Copper(II) oxide, which is common in colorful minerals such as turquoise and malachite, can damage the endocrine and central nervous systems. The most common minerals are silicates, and the dust from these rocks can result in silicosis. Fossil rocks can be radioactive.

For lapidary work, safety precautions include wearing a National Institute for Occupational Safety and Health approved respirator with replaceable cartridges and dust filters; using a local exhaust ventilation system or working outside; using proper lubricants; wearing protective clothing; showering and shampooing immediately afterward; and using a wet mop to clean the workshop.

== Societies and clubs ==
There are lapidary clubs throughout the world. In Australia, there are numerous gem shows, including an annual gem show called the GEMBOREE, which is a nationwide lapidary competition. There is a collection of gem and mineral shows held in Tucson, Arizona, at the beginning of February each year. The event began with the Tucson Gem and Mineral Society Show and has now grown to include dozens of other independent shows. In 2012, this concurrent group of shows constituted the largest gem and mineral event in the world.

In the United States, societies include the American Gem Society.

== See also ==
- Amber
- Diamantaire
- Diamond
- Diamond cutting
- Gemstone
- Handicraft
- Jade
- Lapping
- Pearl
- Ruby
- Sandpaper
