= Pitch (resin) =

Natural or manufactured resin

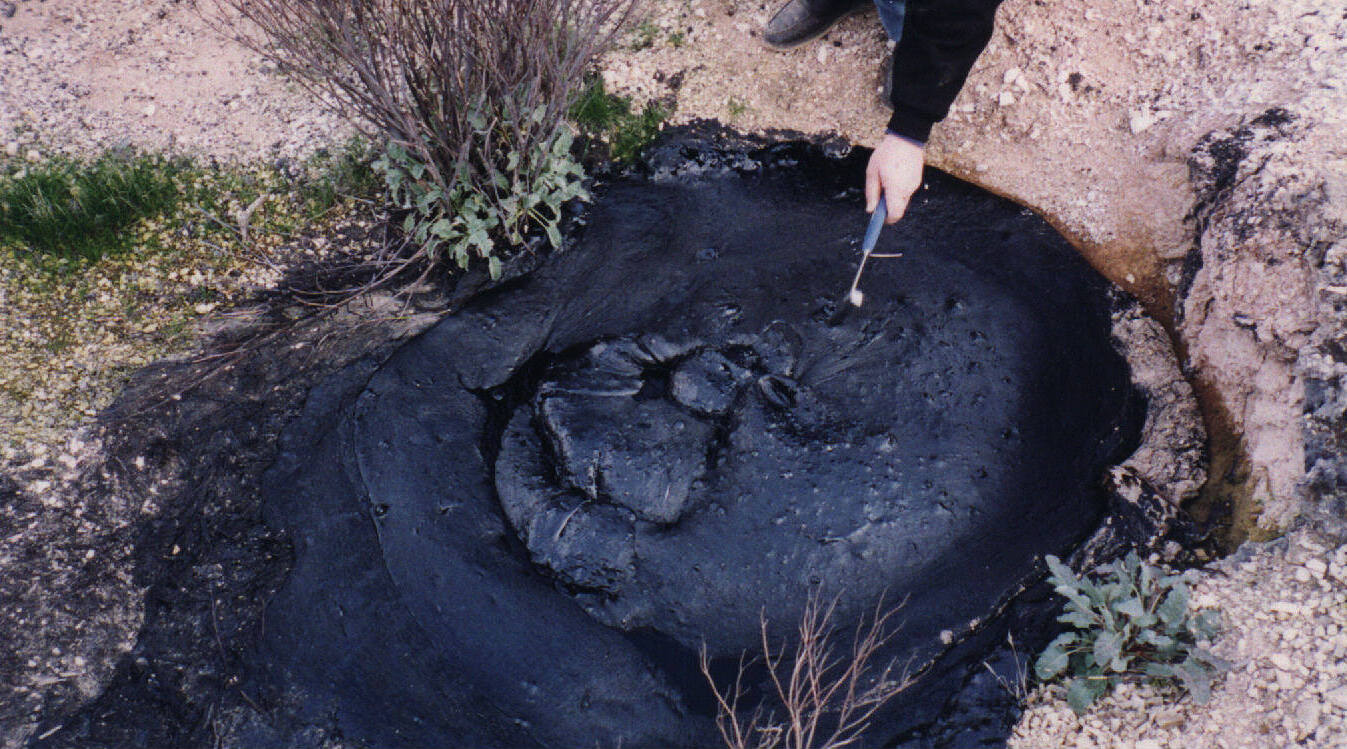
Natural bitumen pitch, from the tar pit above the McKittrick Oil Field, Kern County, California

Pitch is a viscoelastic polymer which can be natural or manufactured, derived from petroleum, coal tar, or plants. Pitch produced from petroleum may be called bitumen or asphalt, while plant-derived pitch, a resin, is known as rosin in its solid form. Tar is sometimes used interchangeably with pitch but generally refers to less viscous substances, including some derived from coal production, such as coal tar, and some from plants, such as pine tar.

== Production ==
Pitch is the principal product of coal tar, at least from the economic perspective. Coal tar is produced by thermolysis of coal, usually with the objective of obtaining coke, which is heavily used in the production of iron and steel. The thermolysis is conducted at >700 °C, yielding about 75% of coke, the rest being tar and gases. The tar is further processed, generating some chemicals, some fuel (for the thermolysis and distillation), and a soft pitch. Further treatment of the soft pitch yields pitch.

Pitch sometimes refers to materials obtained from conifers, such as naval stores. Somewhat like the processing of coal to coke and tar, tree exudates (rosins) are processed (solvent extraction or distillation) to obtain organic compounds. The pitch is obtained from fractions with a high boiling point or is undistillable.

== Uses ==
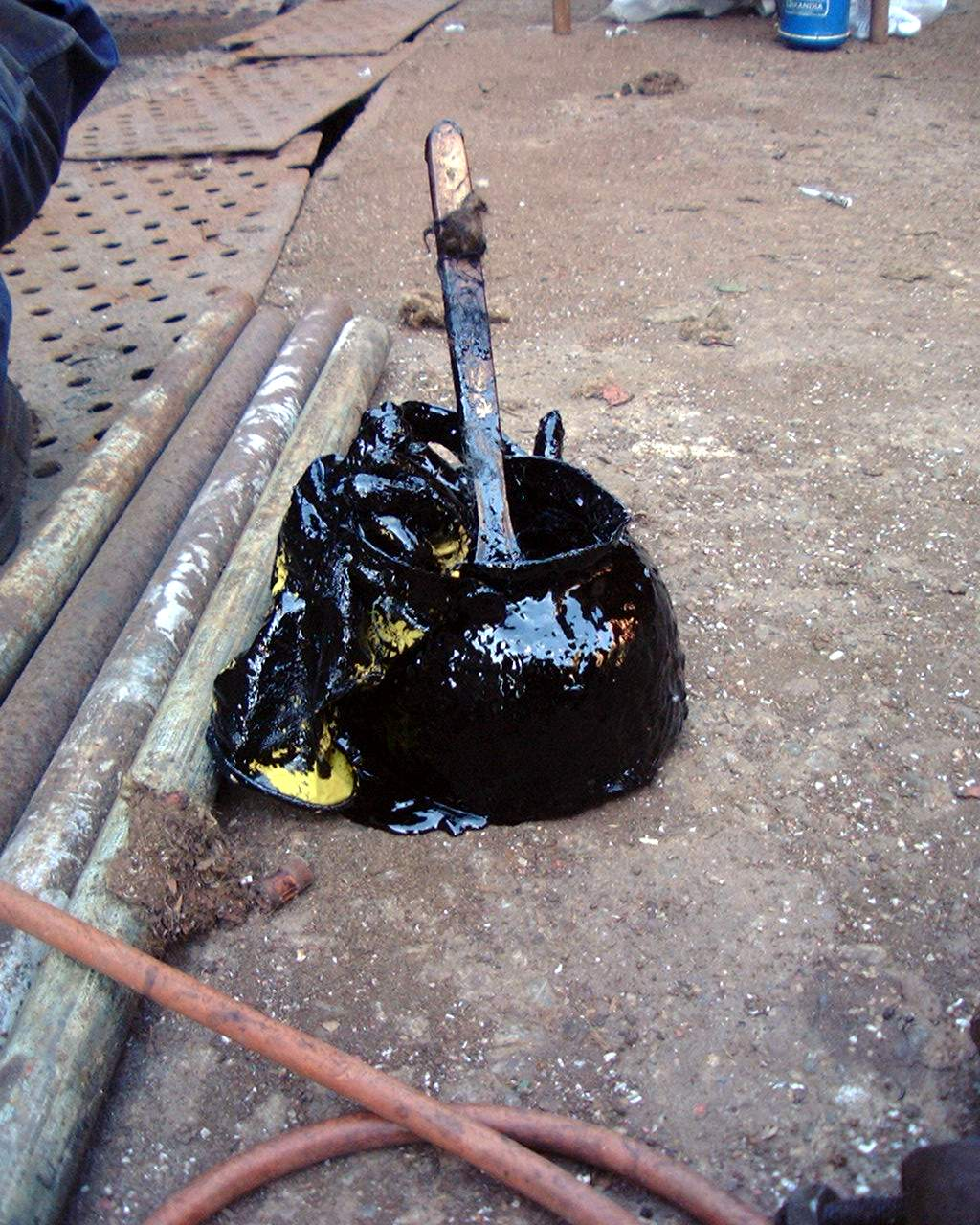
Bucket of pitch for use on ships

Pitch, a product of the naval store industry was used to caulk the seams of wooden sailing vessels (see shipbuilding). Other important historic uses included coating earthenware vessels for the preservation of wine, waterproofing wooden containers, and making torches. It was also used to make patent fuel from coal slack around the turn of the 19th century. Petroleum-derived pitch is black in colour, hence the adjectival phrase "pitch-black".

The viscoelastic properties of pitch make it well suited for the polishing of high-quality optical lenses and mirrors. In use, the pitch is formed into a lap or polishing surface, which is charged with iron oxide (Jewelers' rouge) or cerium oxide. The surface to be polished is pressed into the pitch, then rubbed against the surface so formed. The ability of pitch to flow, albeit slowly, keeps it in constant uniform contact with the optical surface.

Chaser's pitch is a combination of pitch and other substances, used in jewelry making.

== Viscoelastic properties ==
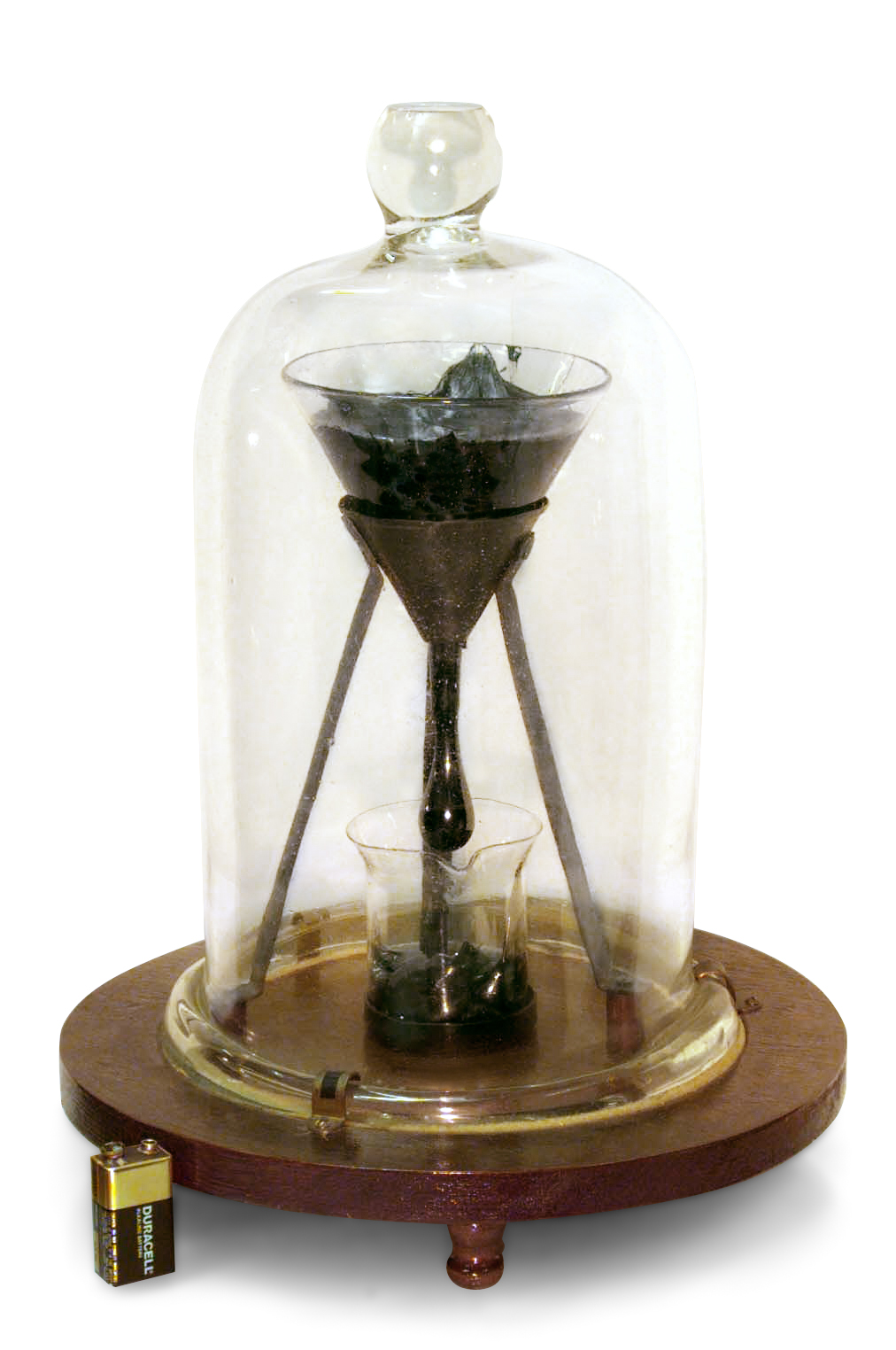
The pitch shown in this University of Queensland pitch drop experiment has a viscosity approximately 100 billion times that of water.

Naturally occurring asphalt/bitumen, a type of pitch, is a viscoelastic polymer. This means that even though it seems to be solid at room temperature and can be shattered with a hard impact, it is actually fluid and will flow over time, but extremely slowly. The pitch drop experiment taking place at University of Queensland is a long-term experiment which demonstrates the flow of a piece of pitch over many years. For the experiment, pitch was put in a glass funnel and allowed to slowly drip out. Since the pitch was allowed to start dripping in 1930, only nine drops have fallen. It was calculated in the 1980s that the pitch in the experiment has a viscosity approximately 100 billion (10^{11}) times that of water. The eighth drop fell on 28 November 2000, and the ninth drop fell on 17 April 2014. Another experiment was started by a colleague of Nobel Prize winner Ernest Walton in the physics department of Trinity College in Ireland in 1944. Over the years, the pitch had produced several drops, but none had been recorded. On July 11, 2013, scientists at Trinity College caught pitch dripping from a funnel on camera for the first time.

== See also ==
- Asphaltene
- Creosote
