= Chaser's pitch =

Thermal setting adhesive used by metalwork artisans

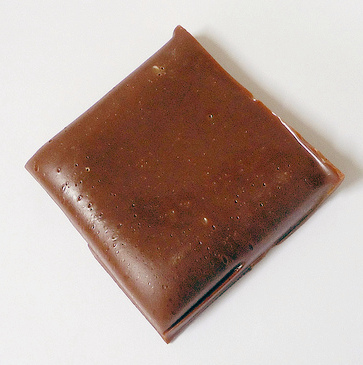
Red pitch

Chaser's pitch is a thermal adhesive used by goldsmiths, silversmiths, coppersmiths, and other metal cold-working artisans to hold a metal plate for repoussage and "chasing" (embossing) while it is being hammered out.

Generally, chaser's pitch must become soft or even liquid when heated at moderate temperatures, in order to fit the object and fill all its nooks and crannies. For many uses, it is desirable that the pitch is soft like glazing putty while it is still cool enough to be molded with the fingers. On the other hand, at room temperature it must be hard enough to hold the object. It must strongly adhere to the metal while it is cooling.

There are many varieties of chaser's pitch available, that differ on the nature or the ingredients, physical properties (such as fusibility and hardness), or place of origin. Names include Swedish pitch, Red (or Brown) German pitch, green chaser's pitch, and black chaser's pitch.

== Handling ==
=== Heating ===
A heat gun is a preferred way to heat up the pitch (and, if necessary, the metal object). A powerful hair dryer could also work. A blow torch as used by plumbers may also be used, although it creates a fire hazard since the pitch (and any vapors it may release when hot) are flammable.

=== Receptacles ===
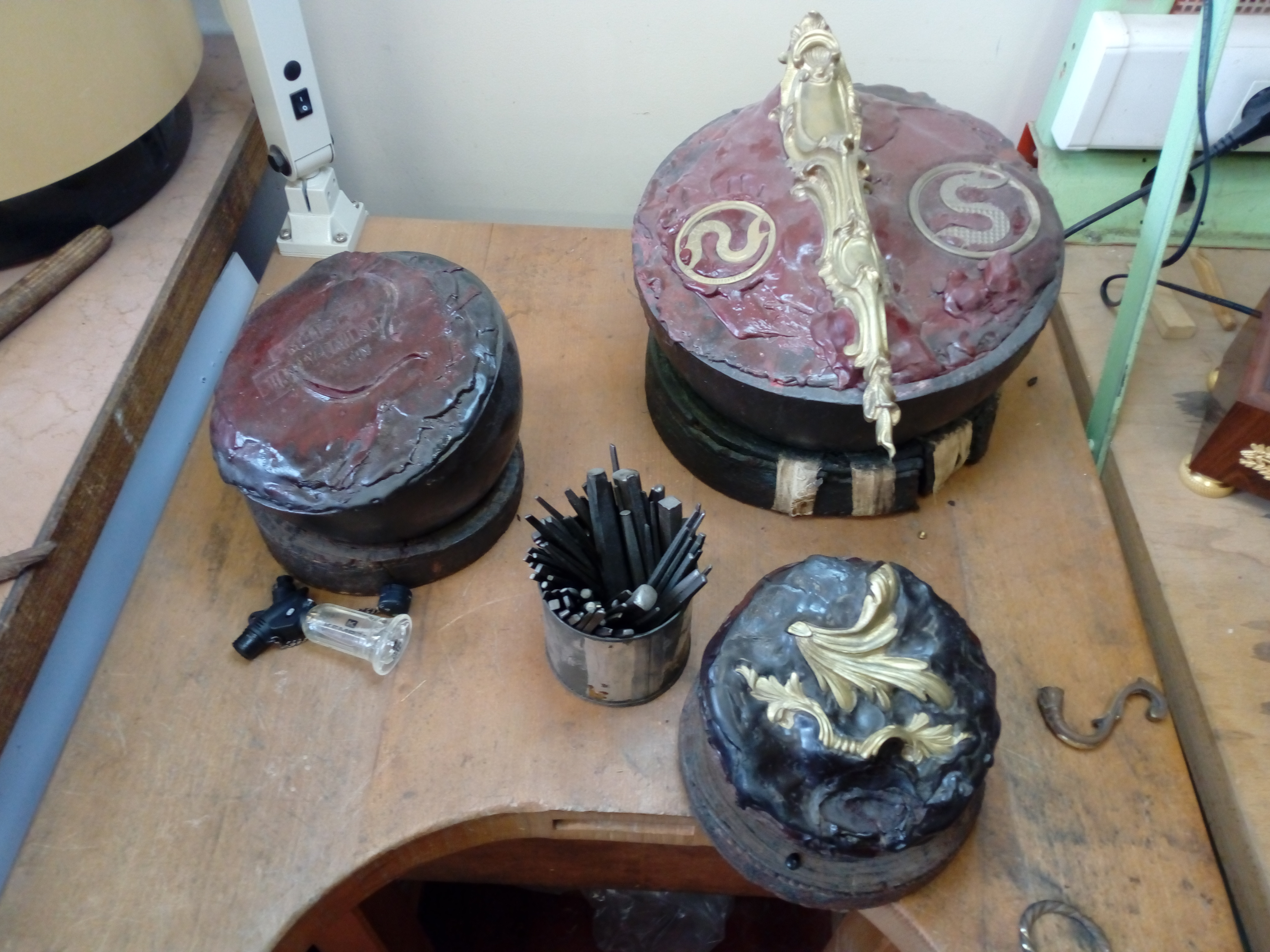
Pitch bowls holding work pieces

For repoussé or other metalworking, the pitch is usually poured or pressed while hot into a "pitch tray" for larger pieces, or in a heavy hemispherical cast iron "pitch bowl" for smaller ones. The bowl, typically 6 to 20 cm in diameter, can be placed over a sand bag or leather ring, and tilted to whatever angle is most convenient. Its weight (3–4 kg when filled) will keep it firm enough for most jewelry work.

For deep repoussé or chasing works, the pitch is usually applied as a thick layer on top of some backing material that can accommodate larger deformations.

=== Cleanup ===
Pitch residues stuck to the object can be removed with an appropriate solvent, such as turpentine. A blow torch can also be used to burn the residues, if the object can withstand the temperature.

=== Recycling ===
Chaser's pitch has indefinite shelf life and can be re-melted and re-used indefinitely.

== Composition ==
Chaser's pitch is usually a combination of

- a "pitch" proper, that provides the basic adherence and fusibility;
- a "filler", such as powdered pumice or plaster of Paris, to improve firmness;
- an emollient, such as Venetian turpentine, that makes it softer.

The pitch can be a form of asphalt derived from petroleum, or can be derived from resins of various trees.

=== Recipes ===
A typical recipe could be:

- 16 parts pitch
- 20 parts plaster of Paris
- 4 parts resin
- 1 part tallow

The pitch is heated until molten. Plaster of Paris is added a small amount at a time. Resin and tallow are then mixed in.

== See also ==
- Dopping cement, used to hold gemstones while grinding or polishing.
