= Repoussé and chasing =

Metalworking technique

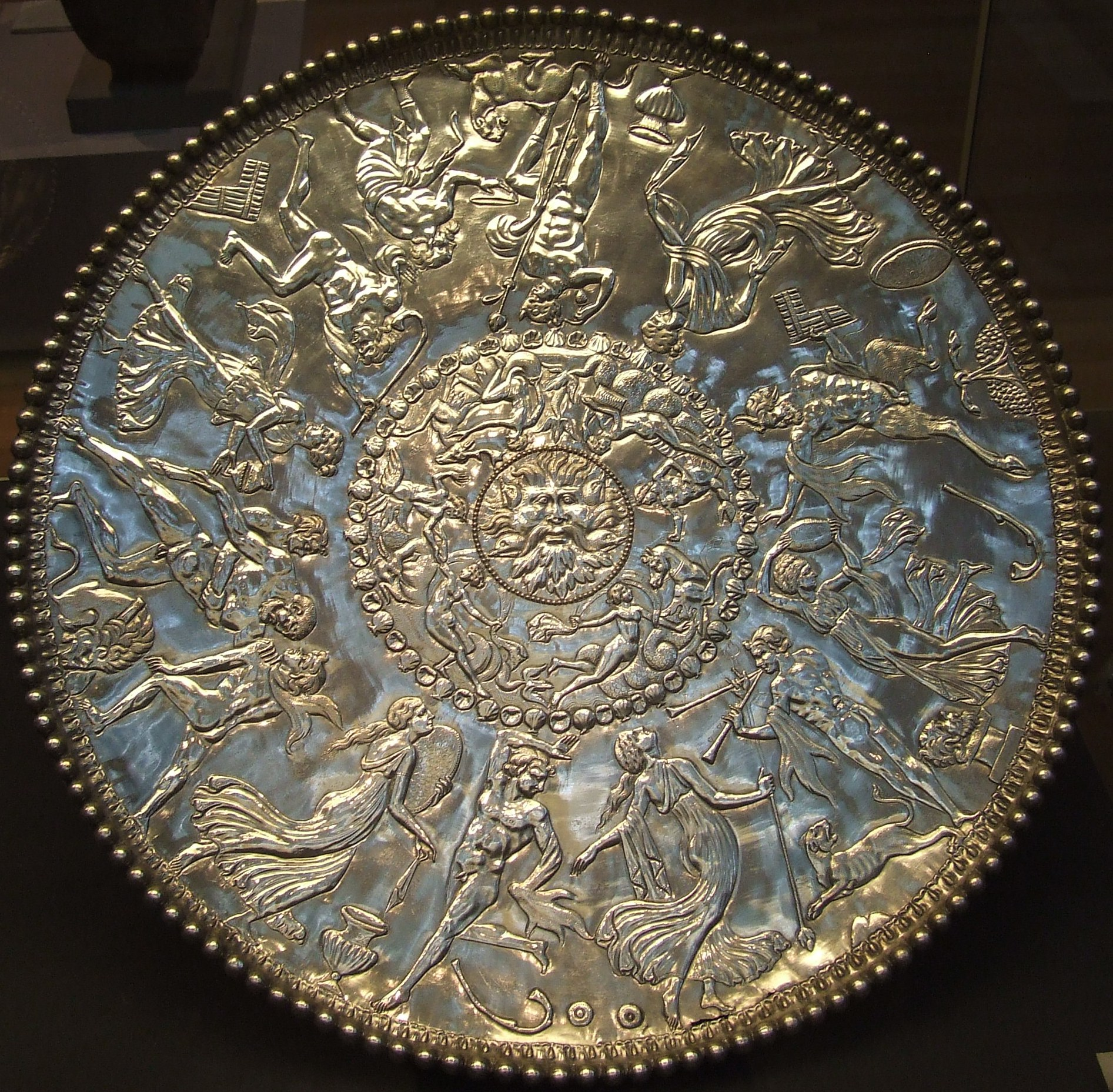
The Great Dish, or Great Plate of Bacchus, from the Roman Mildenhall Treasure

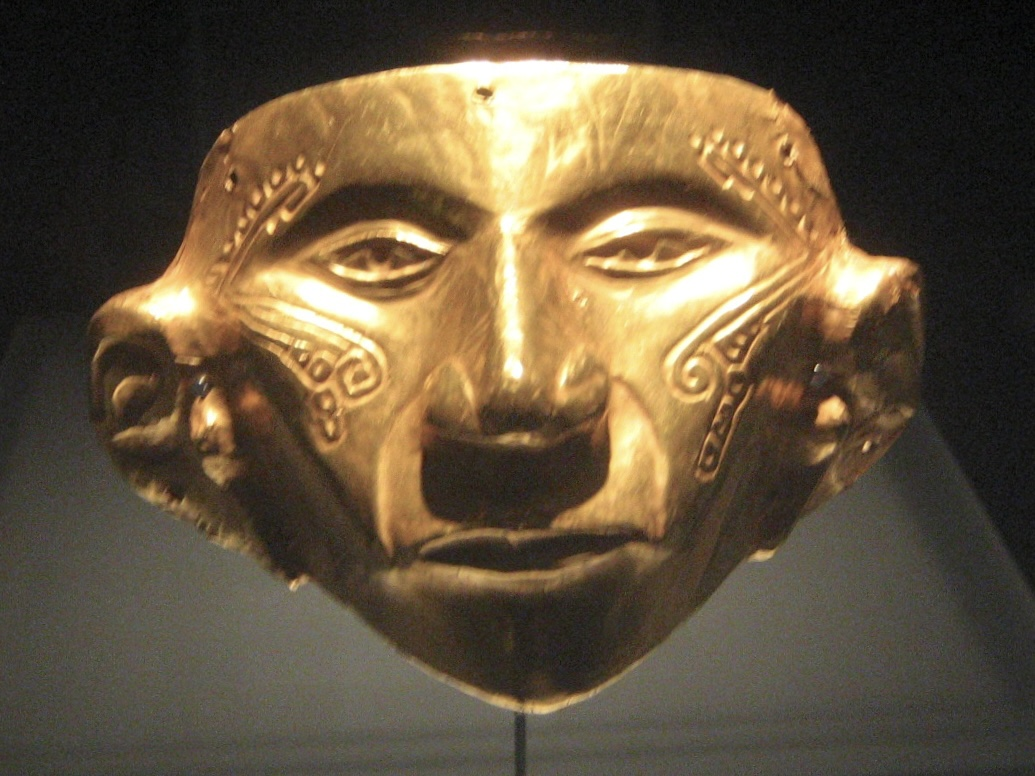
Golden mask from Colombia, at the Museo del Oro. Possibly from the Calima culture (100–500 AD)

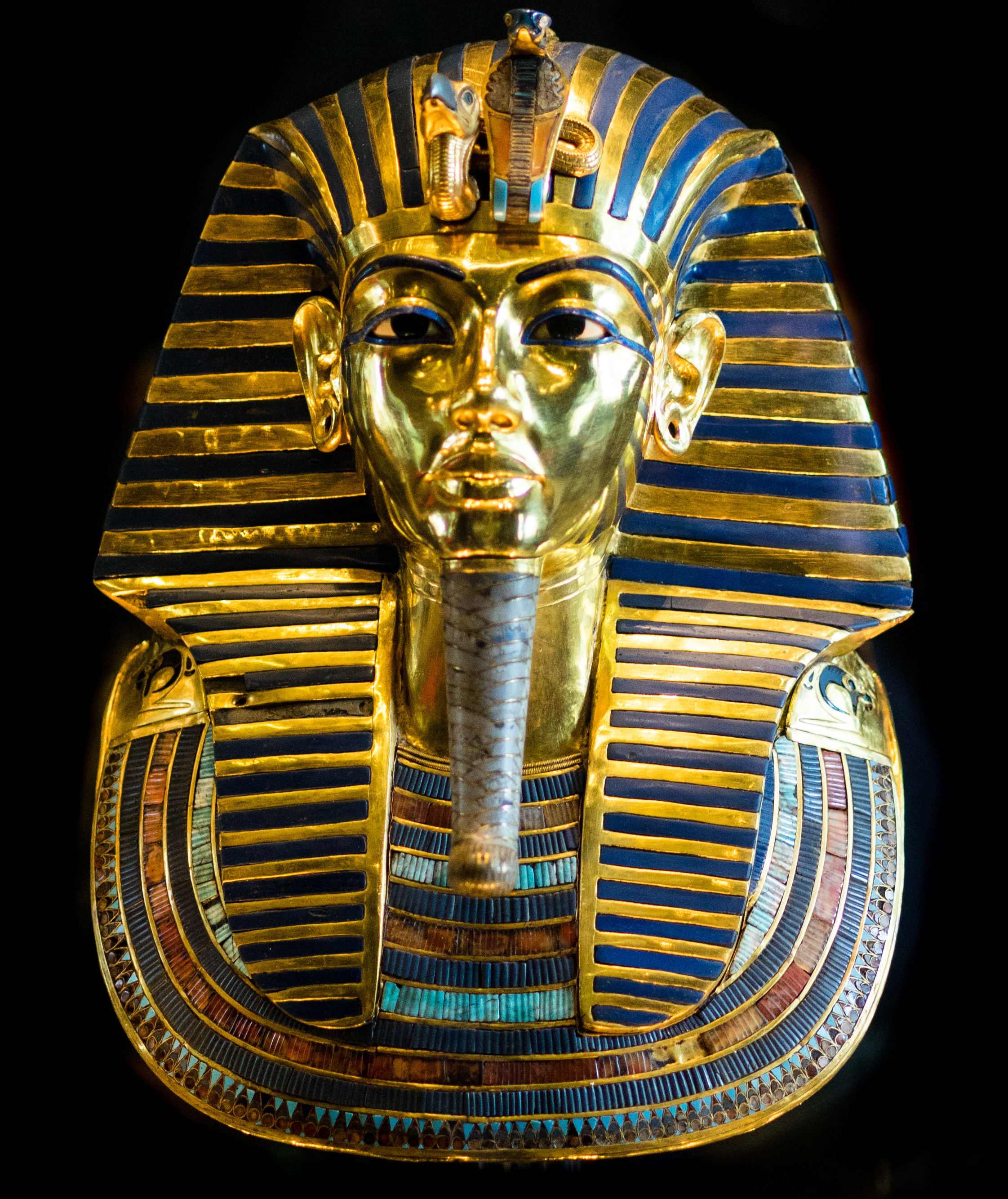
Golden mask of Tutankhamun's mummy

Repoussé (French: [ʁəpuse]) or repoussage ([ʁəpusaʒ]) is a metalworking technique in which a malleable metal is shaped by hammering from the reverse side to create a design in low relief. Chasing (French: ciselure) or embossing is a similar technique in which the piece is hammered on the front side, sinking the metal. The two techniques are often used in conjunction.

Many metals can be used for chasing and repoussé work, including gold, silver, copper, and alloys such as steel, bronze, and pewter.

These techniques are very ancient and have been extensively used all over the world, as they require only the simplest tools and materials, and yet allow great diversity of expression. They are also relatively economical, since there is no loss or waste of metal, which mostly retains its original size and thickness. Toolmarks are often intentionally left visible in the result.

A few among many famous examples of repoussé and chasing are the Gundestrup cauldron, the mask on the mummy of Tutankhamun, the body armours of the Bronze Age, the copper ornaments made by the Native Americans in the Southeastern United States, and the Statue of Liberty in New York City.

== Etymology ==
The word repoussé is French and means "pushed up", ultimately from Latin pulsare, which means "to push". Repoussage is the noun to refer to the technique, with repoussé being an adjective referring to a piece to which the technique has been applied (e.g. "repoussé work", "repoussé piece").

Chasing comes from the French word, chasser meaning to drive out, or to chase around which is what the artists are doing as they "chase" the forms on their metal in order to create their final design.

== History ==
The techniques of repoussé and chasing date from Antiquity and have been used widely with gold and silver for fine detailed work and with copper, tin, and bronze for larger sculptures.

=== European prehistory and Bronze Age ===
During the 3rd millennium BC, in the Middle East, a variety of semi-mass production methods were introduced to avoid repetitive free-hand work. With the simplest technique, sheet gold could be pressed into designs carved in intaglio in stone, bone, metal or even materials such as jet. The gold could be worked into the designs with wood tools or, more commonly, by hammering a wax or lead "force" over it.

The alternative to pressing gold sheet into a die is to work it over a design in cameo relief. Here the detail would be greater on the back of the final design, so some final chasing from the front was often carried out to sharpen the detail.

The use of patterned punches dates back to the first half of the 2nd millennium BC, if not far earlier. The simplest patterned punches were produced by loops or scrolls of wire.

The Gundestrup cauldron (a product of the Celtic culture, made between 150 BC and 1 AD) had originally thirteen separate silver panels, with repoussé relief, lining the inside and outside of the vessel.

=== Ancient Egypt ===
In 1400 BC, the Egyptian Amarna period, resin and mud for repoussé backing was in use.

A fine example of Egyptian repoussé is the mummy mask of Tutankhamun, a Pharaoh of the late Eighteenth Dynasty. The majority of the mask was formed using the technique of repoussé from what appears to be a single sheet of gold. The lapis lazuli and other stones were inlaid in chased areas after the height of the form was completed. The ceremonial beard, Nekhbet vulture, and Uraeus were attached separately.

=== Classical antiquity ===
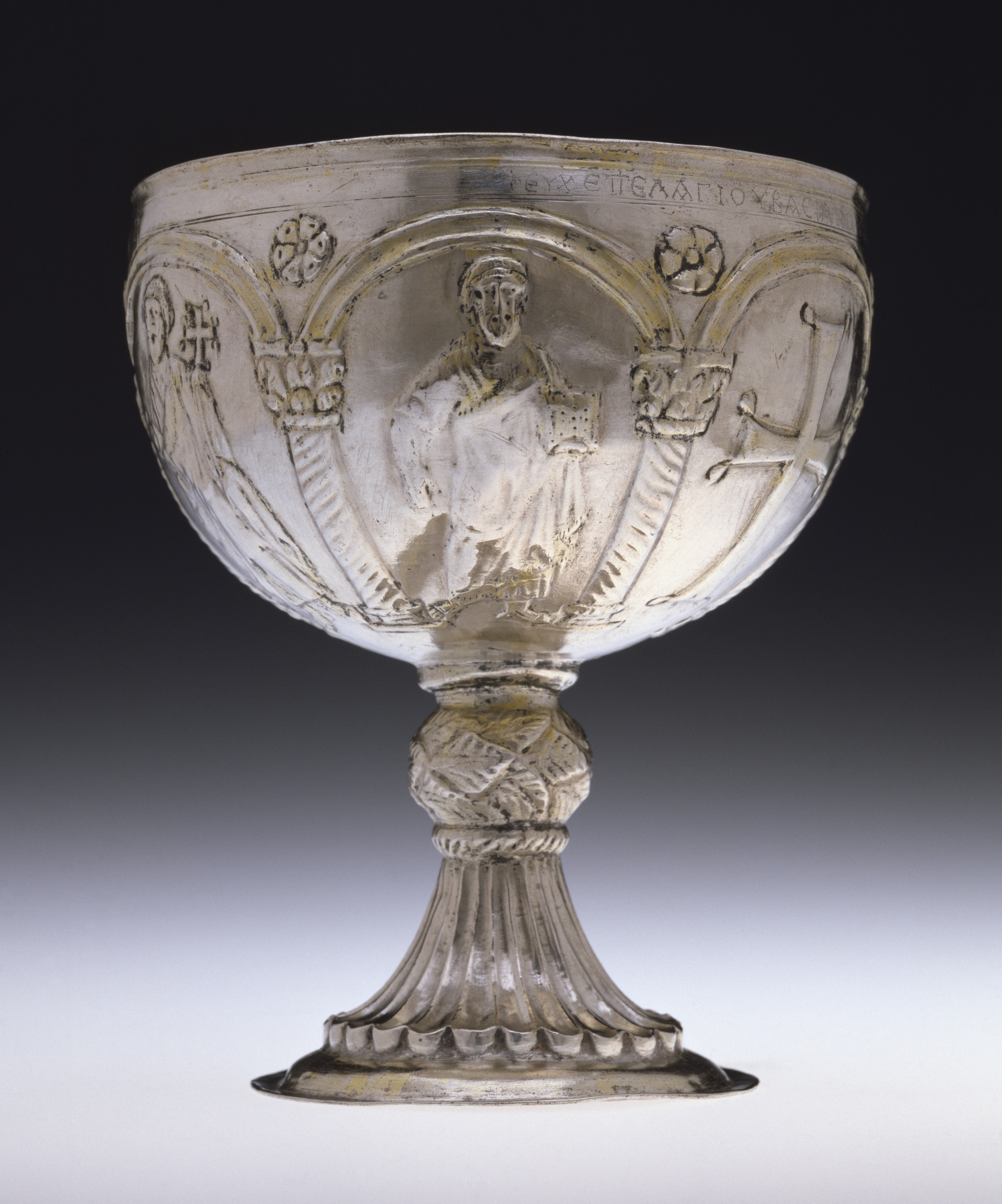
One of twenty-three silver altar vessels believed to have been found in the Syrian village of Kurin. Silver repoussé, partially gilt. The Walters Art Museum.

By Hellenistic times, combined punches and dies were in use. In 400 BC, the Greeks were using beeswax for filler in repoussé.

Classical pieces using repoussage and chasing include the bronze Greek armour plates from the 3rd century BC.

The Warren Cup is a Roman silver cup, and the Mildenhall Treasure, the Hoxne Hoard, the Water Newton Treasure and the Berthouville Treasure are examples of hoards of Roman silver found in England and northern France with many pieces using these techniques. Another example piece using this technique is The Stag’s Head Rhyton, dating to around 400 BCE, which is made from a silver sheet and features three scenes of warriors battling, each scene with two warriors.

=== India ===
Repoussé and chasing are commonly used in India to create objects such as water vessels. These vessels are generally made using sheets of copper or silver.

=== Pre-Columbian America ===
Repoussage and chasing were used by many Pre-Columbian civilizations in the Americas, such as the Chavín culture of Peru (about 900 to 200 BC), to make ornaments of gold and other metals. The Lambayeque culture of coastal Peru (AD 750–1375) produced elaborately repoussé-decorated silver beakers, shaped by repeatedly hammering and annealing sheet metal. Artists planned compositions by first etching shallow guidelines onto the metal surface before working the design, a technique also documented in earlier Moche ceramic art. These vessels were closely associated with ritual and funerary practice, and were often placed in high-status burials.

During the Hopewell and Mississippian periods of the American Southeast and Midwest goods of repoussé copper were fashioned as ritual regalia and eventually used in prestige burials. Examples have been found with many S.E.C.C. designs such as Bi-lobed arrow motif headdresses and falcon dancer plaques. Although examples have been found in a widely scattered area (Spiro, Oklahoma, Etowah, Georgia, and Moundville, Alabama), most are in what is known as the Braden Style, thought to have originated at the Cahokia Site in Collinsville, Illinois. Several copper workshops discovered during excavations of Mound 34 at Cahokia are the only known Mississippian culture copper workshops.

=== Modern works ===
The largest known sculpture created with this technique is the Statue of Liberty, properly Liberté éclairant le monde, ("Liberty Enlightening The World"), in Upper New York Bay. The statue was formed by copper repoussé in sections using wooden structures to shape each piece during the hammering process.

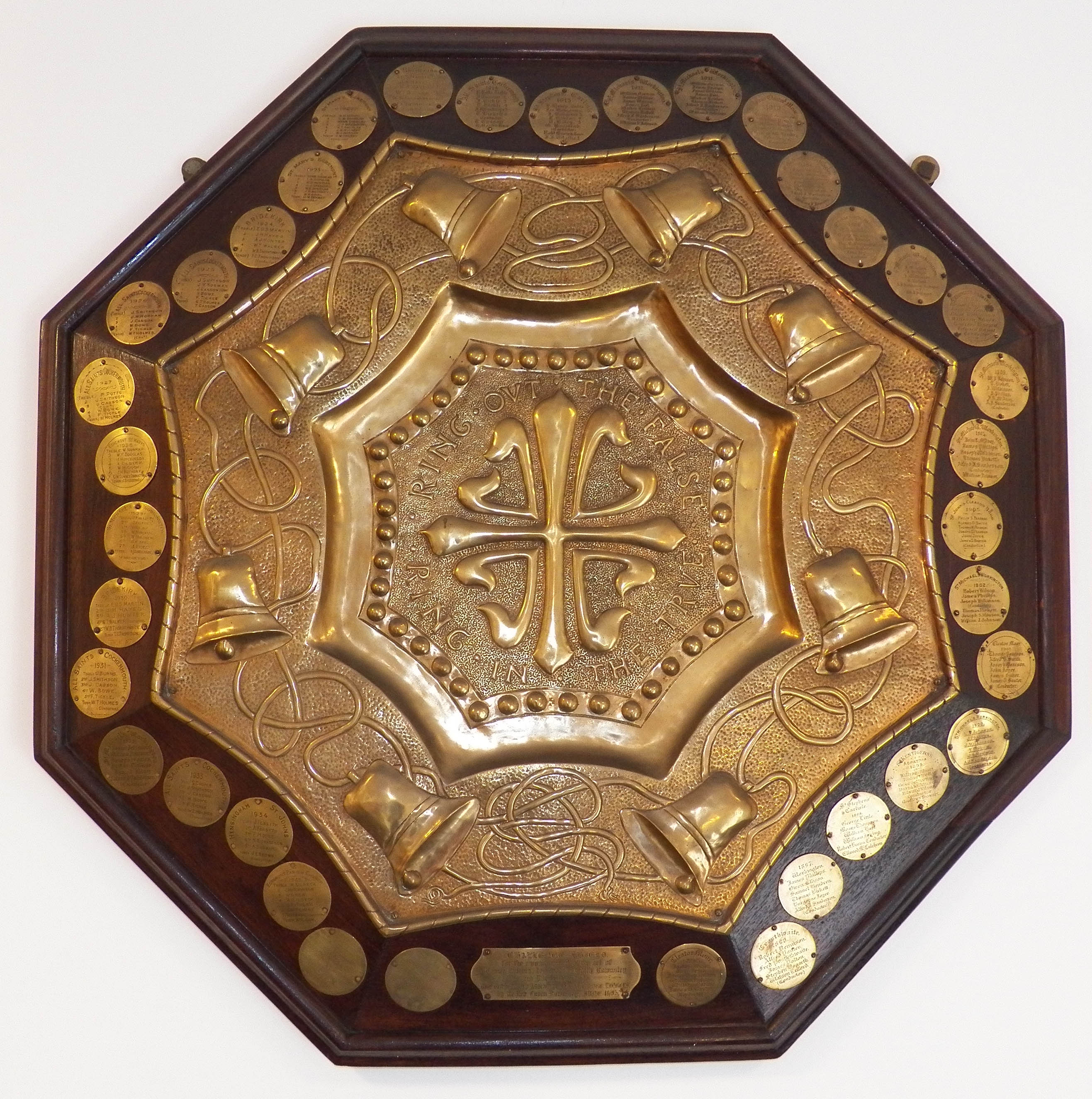
Arts and Crafts repousse shield made by Keswick School of Industrial Art, UK, 1895

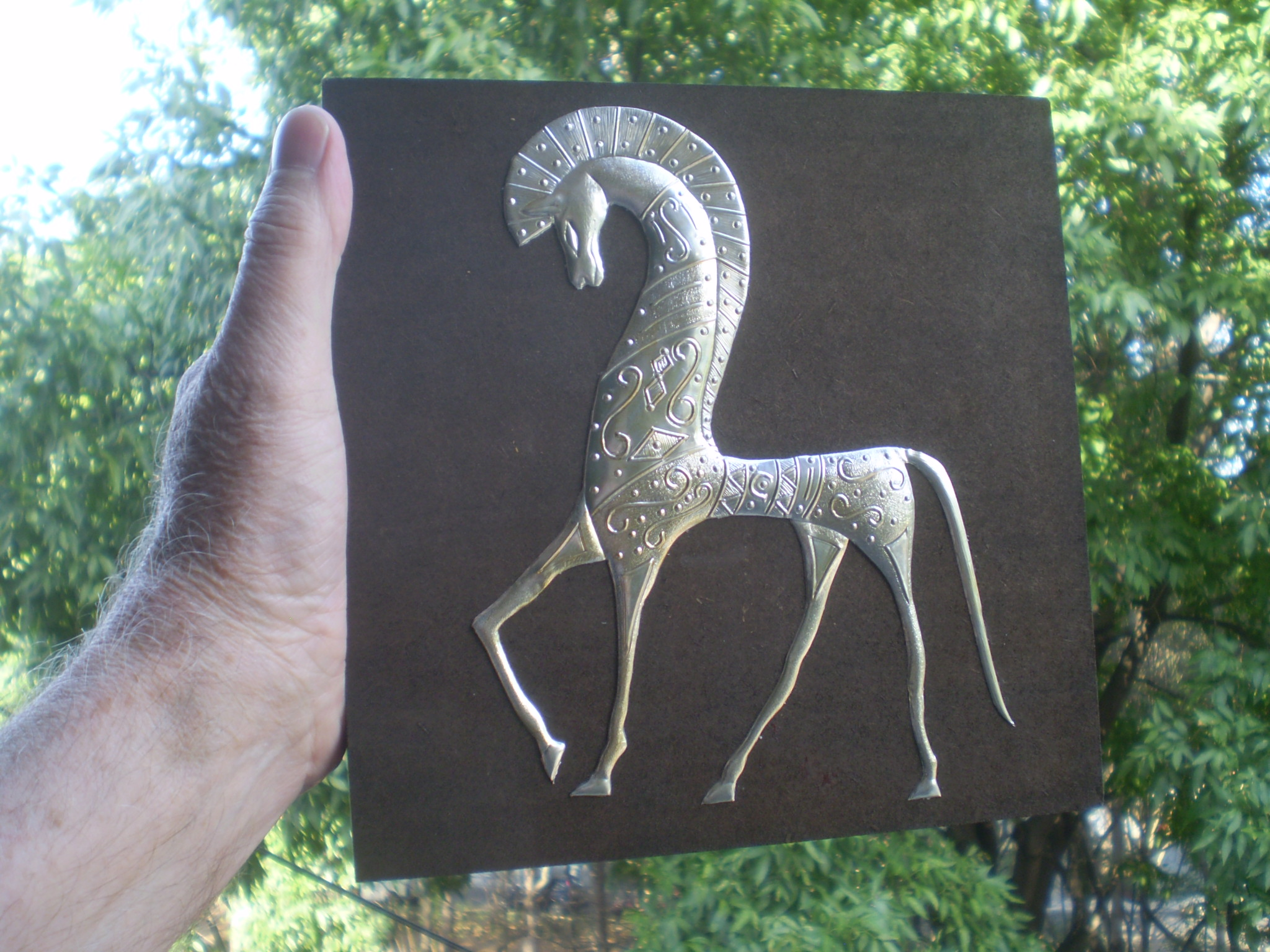
Repoussé on tin sheet – "Greek horse" by Mexican artist Manolo Vega, 2011

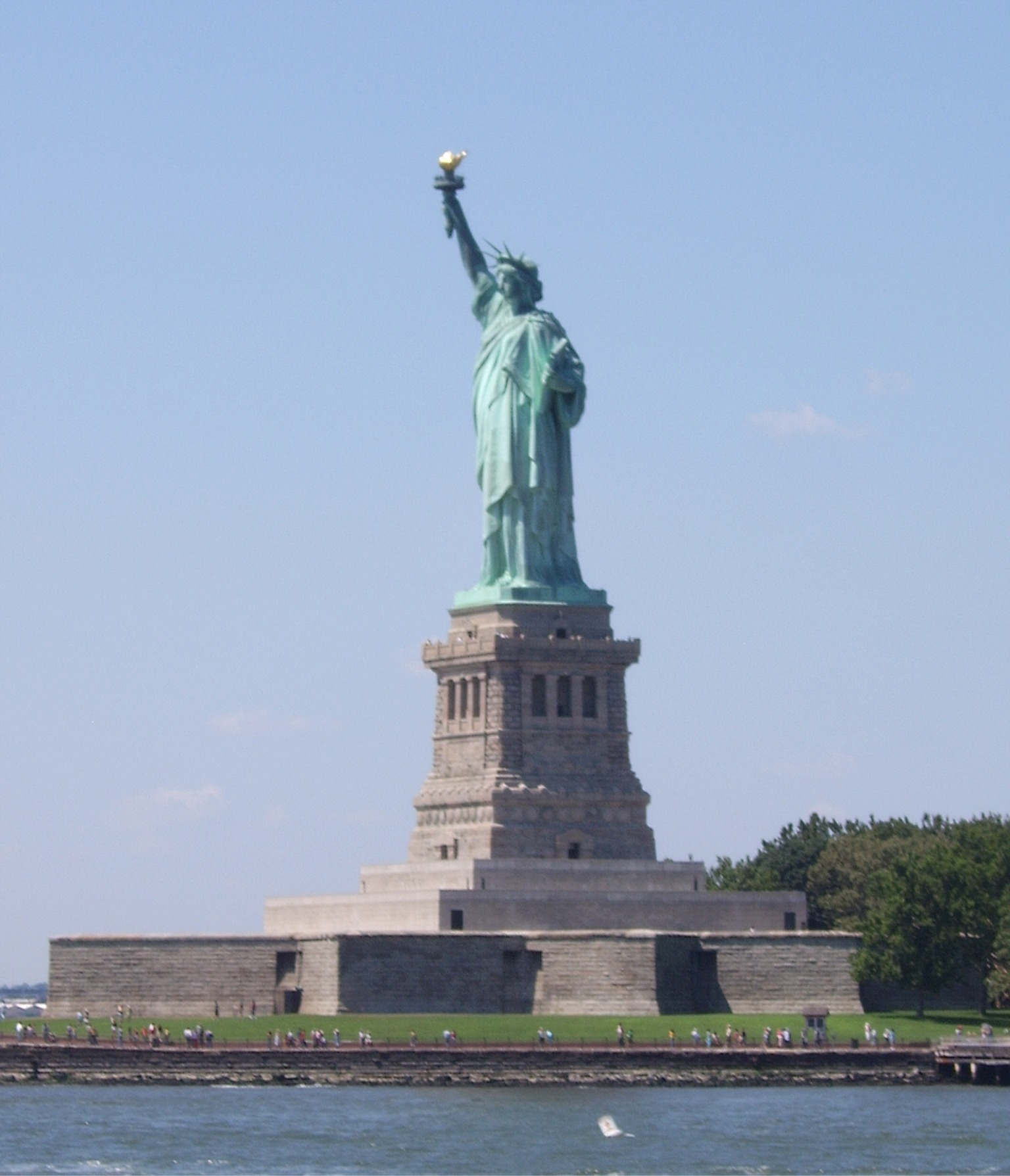
The Statue of Liberty, New York (NY)

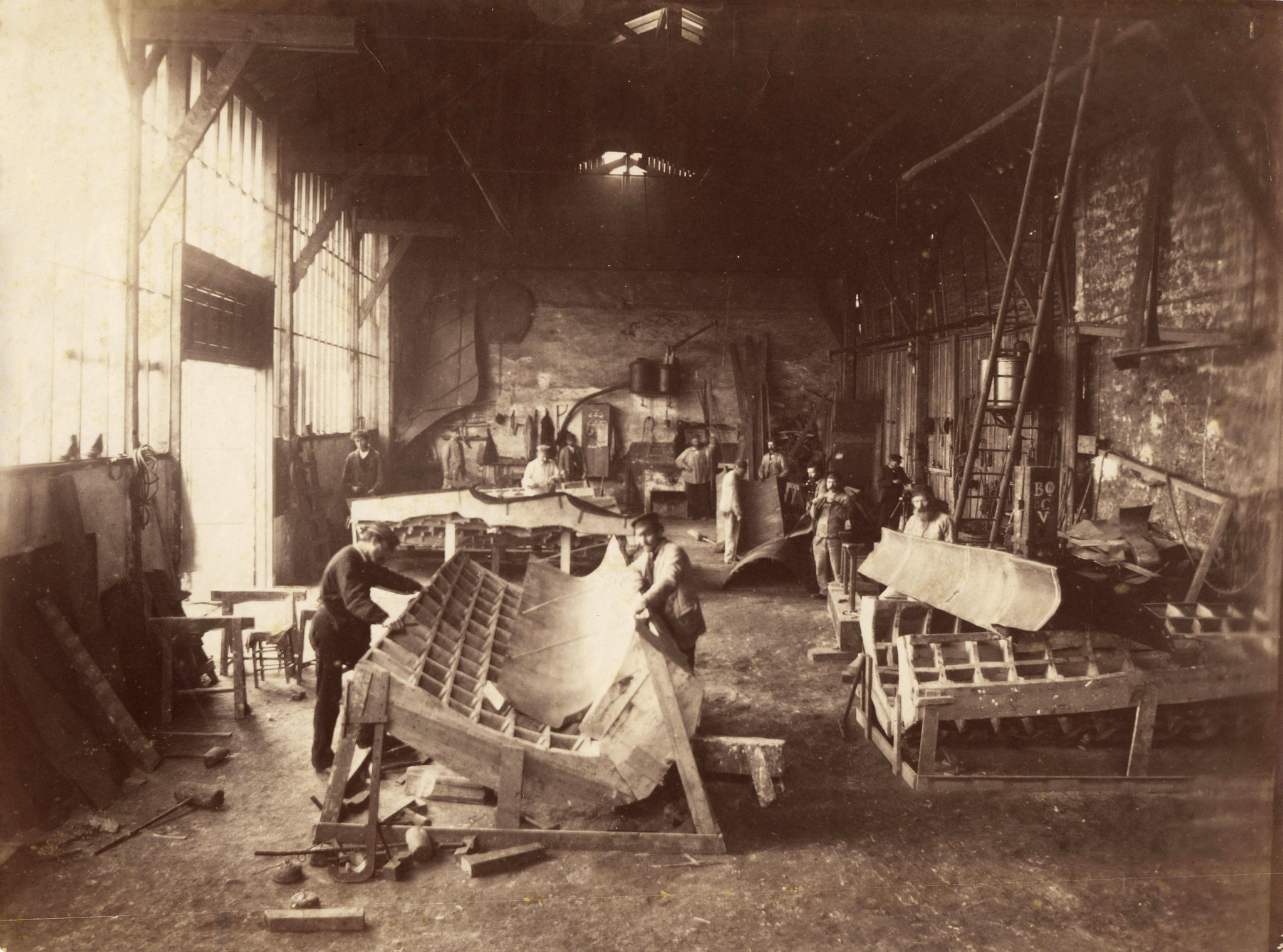
Construction of The Statue of Liberty

== Methods ==
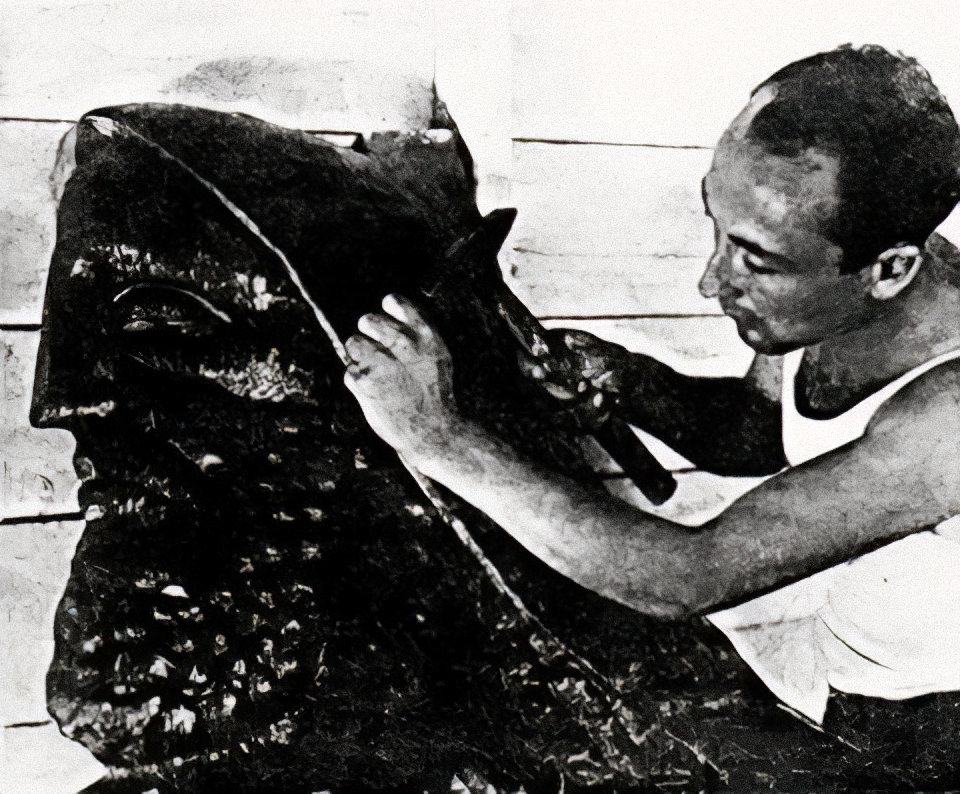
Sculptor Maurice Ascalon at work undertaking the finishing chasing of a copper repoussé relief sculpture circa 1939.

The process of chasing and repoussé requires a number of steps.

=== Annealing ===
The metal plate should usually be annealed—that is, heated for some time at a temperature sufficient to reduce its internal stresses—to make it as malleable as possible. This process may have to be repeated several times, as many metals harden and become brittle as they are deformed by the hammering.

=== Pitch backing ===
The plate must then be fixed on a suitable support. A commonly used technique is to place the metal over a layer of chasers pitch. The pitch is heated until it is soft enough to make good contact with the metal, filling all its crevices, and then allowed to cool. At room temperature, the pitch must be hard enough to adhere to the metal and hold it in place, but still soft and plastic enough to "give" as the metal is hammered into it.

The pitch is often cast as a thick layer over some softer backing material that can absorb larger deformations.

The metal plate will have to be released from the pitch several times, for turning it over and/or for re-annealing. Pitch residues stuck to the plate must be removed with an appropriate solvent.

=== Lining ===
Once the plate is firmly held by the pitch, front side up, the outline of the desired design is lightly chased ("lined") on it by a special tool (a "liner"), that creates narrow raised lines on the other side.

=== Repoussé and chasing ===
The metal is turned over, and firmed again over the pitch, with the back side up. The main repoussé work is then performed, using a variety of punches.

Once the main repoussé is done, the piece is again released by heating. The cavities on the back side, created by the repoussé work, are filled with melted pitch. Once that filling has hardened, the plate is again turned over and placed on top of a layer of softened pitch. Once the pitch has hardened, the design is then refined by chasing. These procedures can be repeated several times, alternating between repoussé and chasing.

=== Hot forming ===
Repoussé and chasing can also be done on materials, like steel, that are too hard to be cold-formed by hammering. That is accomplished by heating the piece to a high enough temperature to make it malleable, as in forging. In this case pitch must be dispensed with, or replaced by some material (like sand) that can withstand the heat and provide the right kind of "giving" support.

== Tools ==
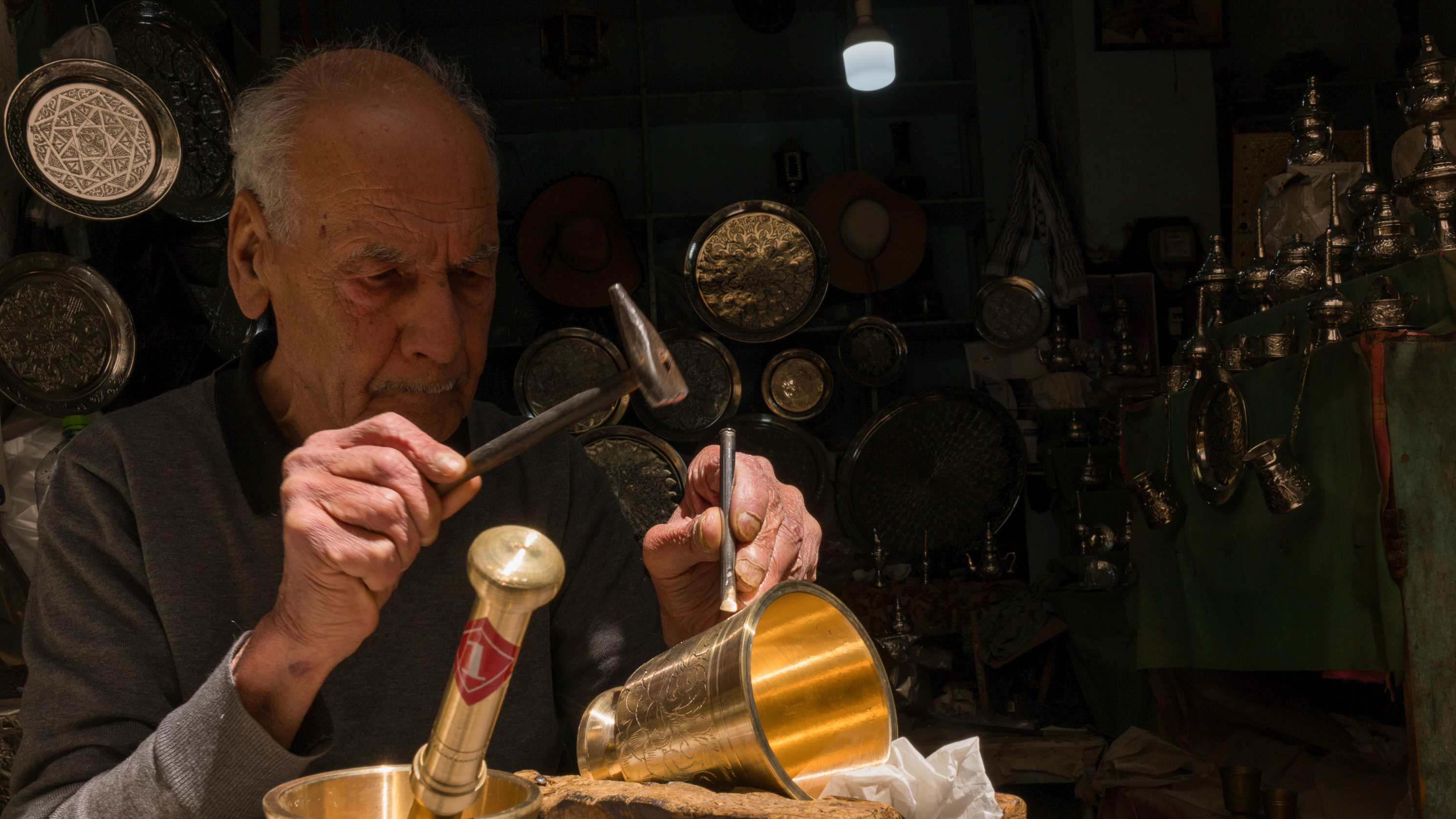
A chaser in Tunis using a lightweight chasing hammer and a liner to chase a pattern into a brass mortar.

The tools needed for these techniques are

- A container for the pitch, such as a "pitch tray" for larger plates, or a heavy hemispherical cast iron "pitch bowl" for smaller ones. The bowl can be placed over a sand bag or leather ring, and tilted to whatever angle is most convenient.
- A heat gun or blow torch to soften the pitch in order to fix the plate, or to release it.
- A set of "punches", that is, chisels with smooth tips that are used to push the metal:
  - A "liner" has a flattened tip with a slightly curved blunt edge. It is used to chase narrow grooves in the metal, or to repoussé narrow ridges from the back side; both for outlining the work, and to refine edges in the final object.
  - A "planisher" has a smooth, flat tip meant for pushing out large, flat areas of metal.
  - A "doming" or "dotting" tool has a round or oval tip of small to moderate diameter, and can be used to chase dimples or grooves, or repoussé bumps and ridges, of various widths.
  - A "matting" tool has a pattern cut into the tip, and is used (mainly in chasing) to create textured areas.
  - A "hollow-faced" punch has a raised contour (circular, or with some other shape) with a hollowed-out middle, and is used to stamp that contour, usually on the front face.
- A lightweight "chasing hammer", to drive the punches.
- An oxyacetylene torch, blowtorch, or a forge for annealing or hot-working.

Other tools are usually handy, such as tweezers or tongs to hold the hot plates.

The punches are usually made of steel, especially tool steel—a hard alloy that can keep its shape even after years of use—and are forged and tempered at the tip. They usually have a beveled rear end, to better handle the hammer blows. They can be purchased and used as such, modified by the user to suit the needs of a specific work, or made by the user from bar stock. To make or reform the punches, one needs a saw or other cutting device, as well as a grinder and abrasives to shape and polish the tip.

== Gallery ==
=== Face masks ===
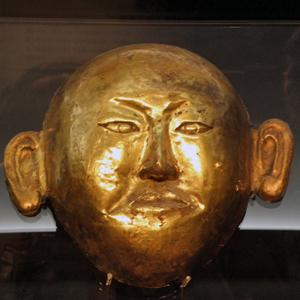
Princess. Gold; Chen Kingdom of Liao Dynasty, 1018 CE.

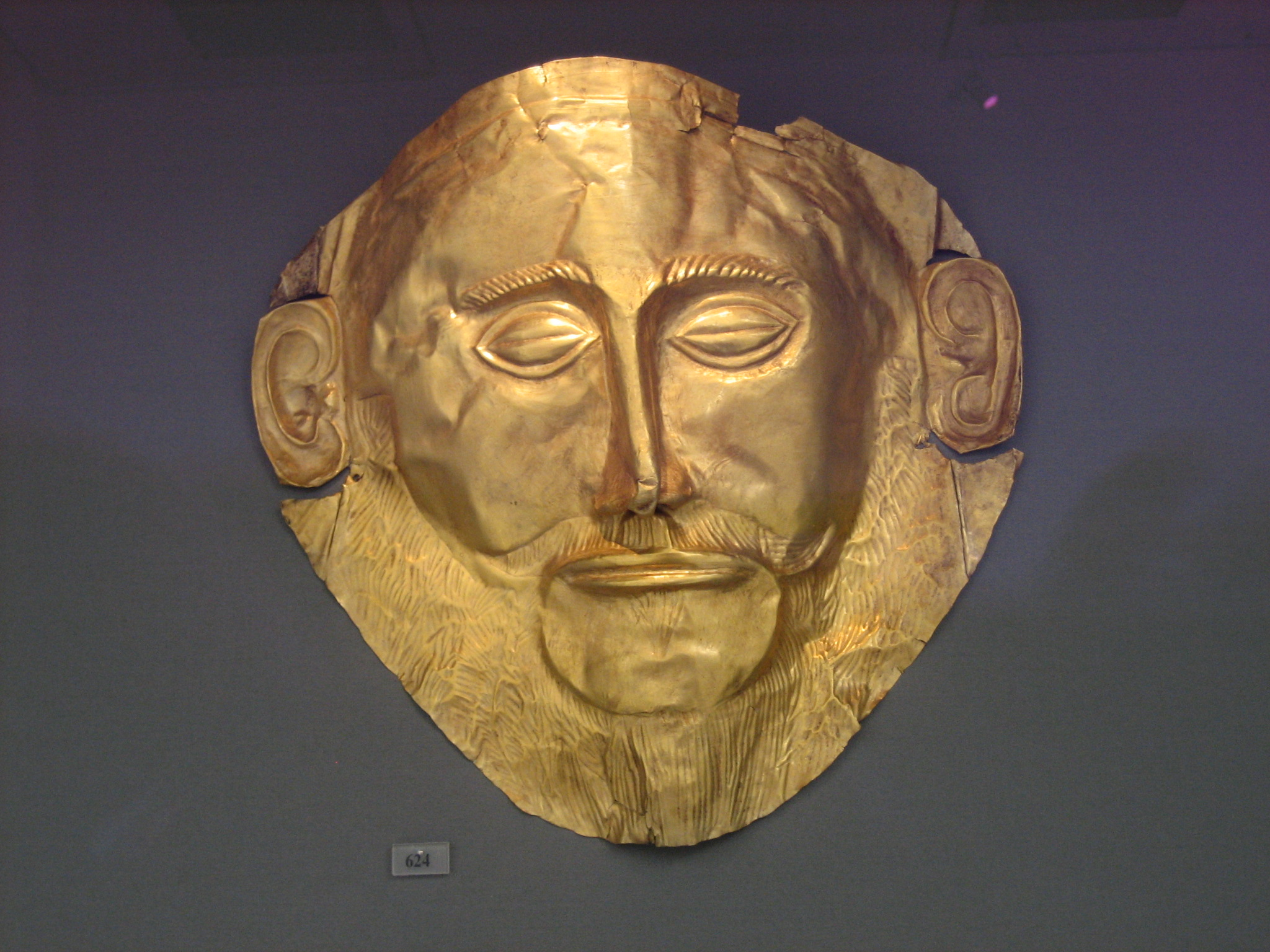
"Mask of Agamemnon". Gold; Mycenae, ca. 1600 BCE.

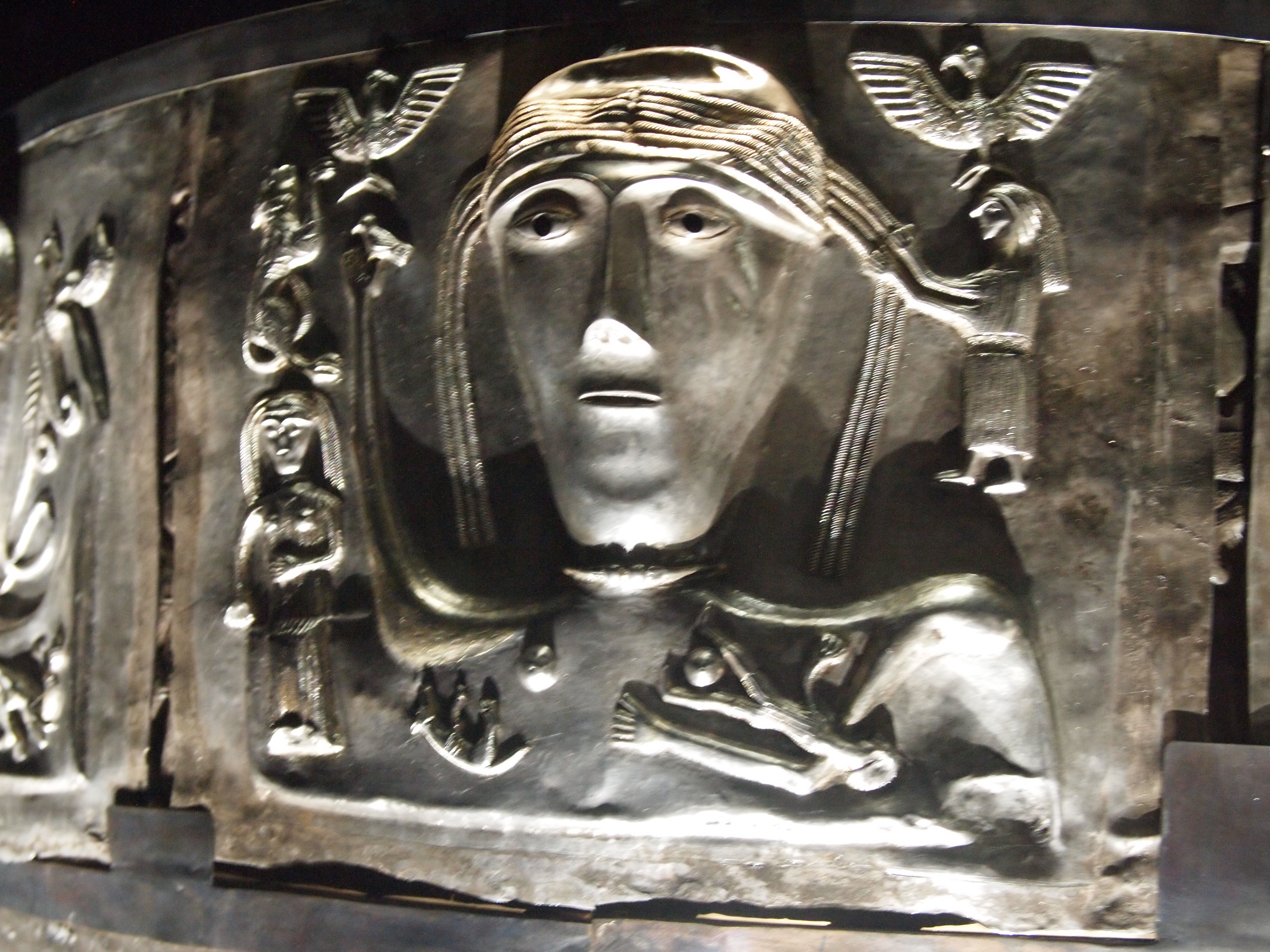
Woman or goddess, Gundestrup Cauldron. Silver; Celtic, ca. 100 BCE.

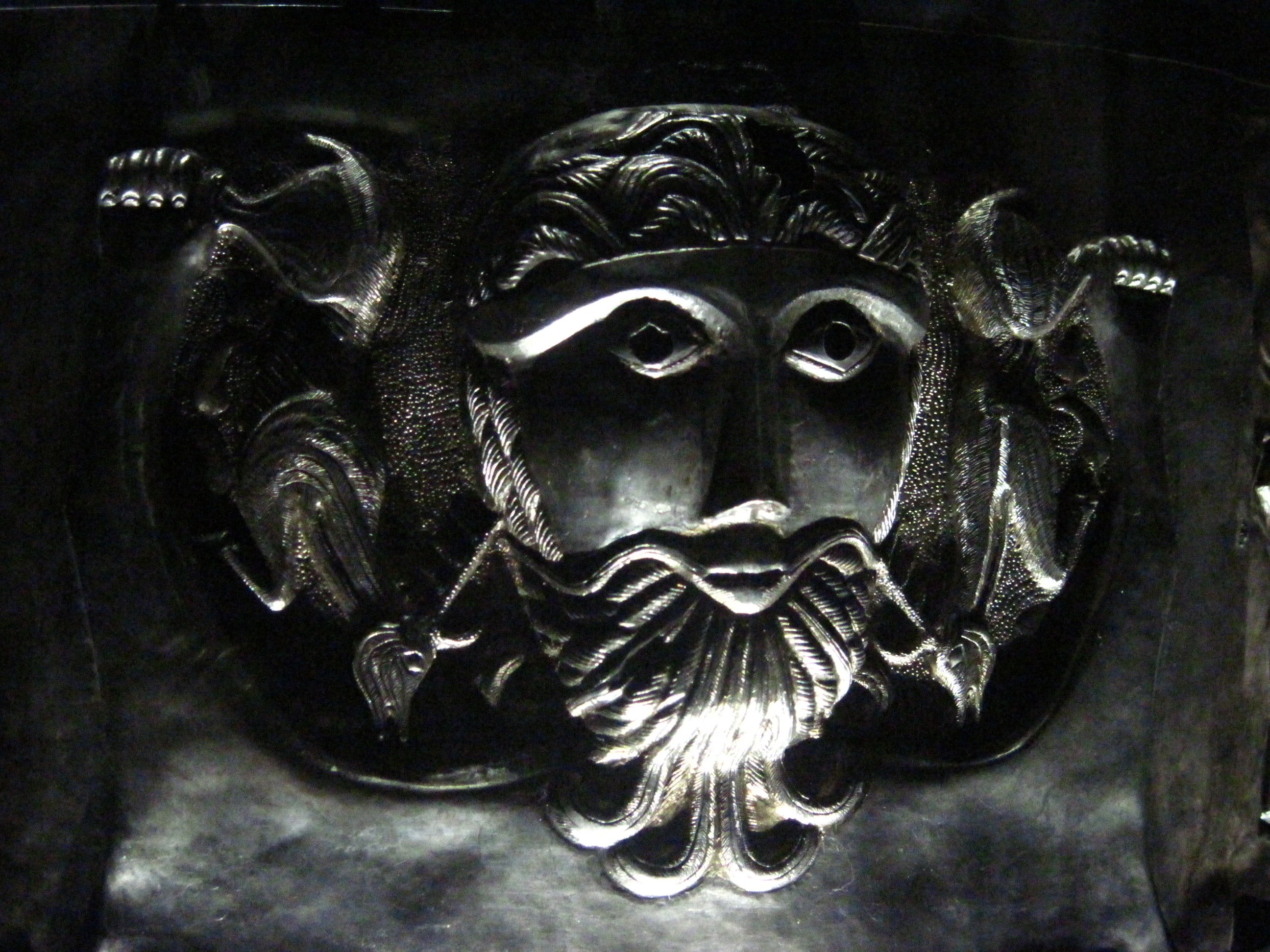
Man or god, Gundestrup Cauldron. Silver; Celtic, ca. 100 BCE.

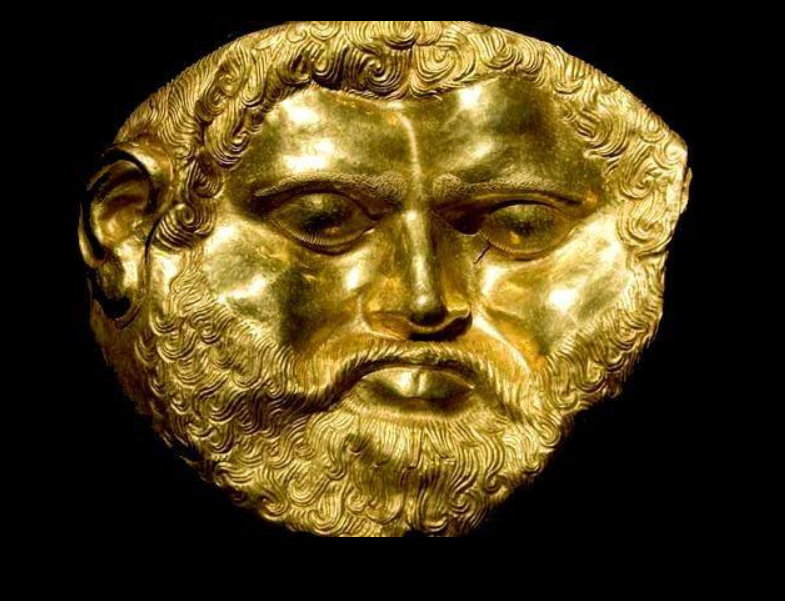
King Teres I. Gold; Thracia, 431 BCE.

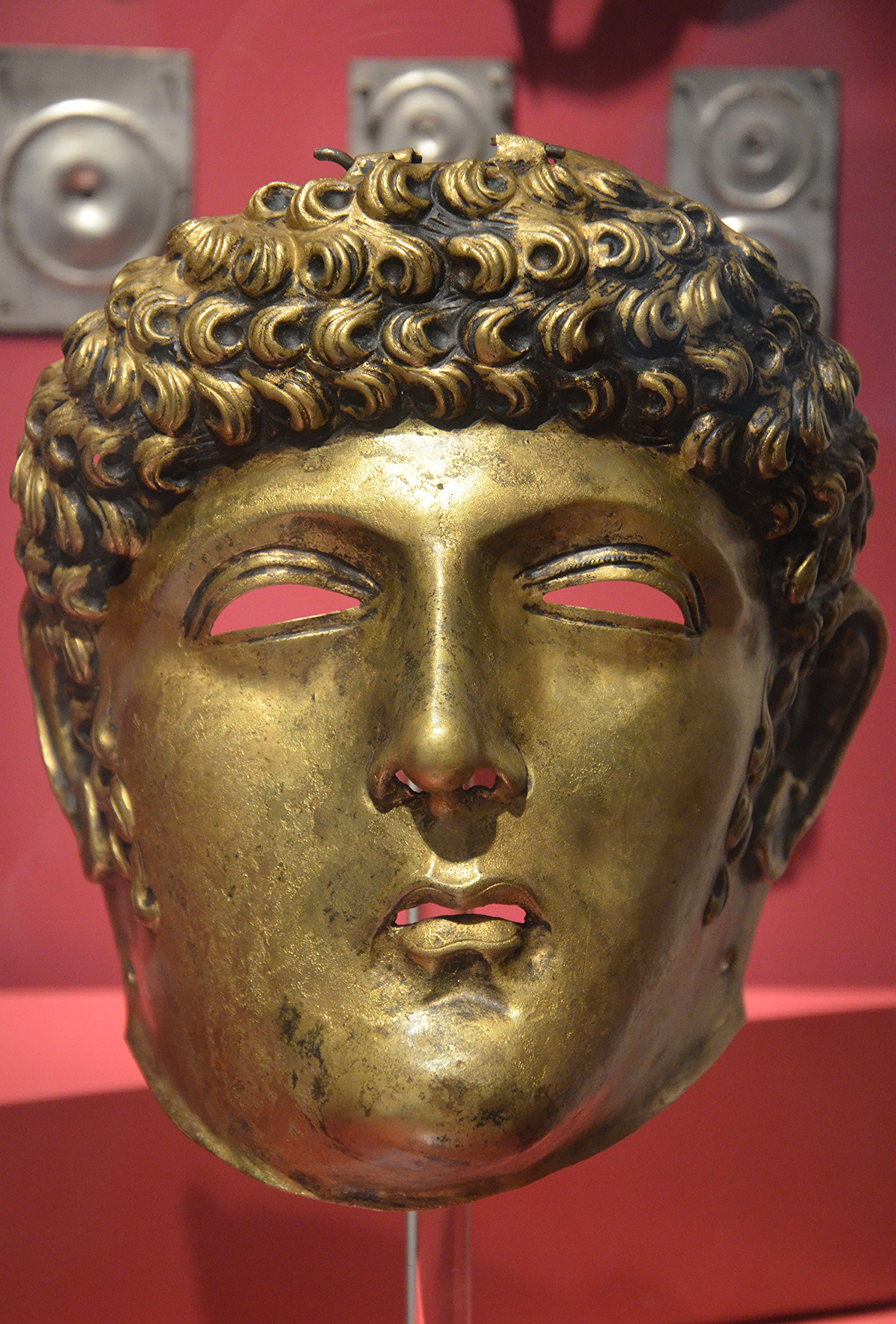
Helmet. Gold; Roman.

== See also ==
- Embossing (manufacturing) – rolling sheet metal through dies to produce a raised or sunk relief design.
- Metal spinning
