= EKWB =

Slovenian computer water cooling company

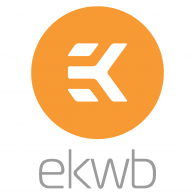
- Industry: Computer hardware
- Founded: 2003; 22 years ago
- Founder: Edvard König
- Headquarters: Komenda, Slovenia
- Products: Water cooling components
- Website: www.ekwb.com

EKWB (Edvard König Water Blocks), better known as EK Water Blocks, is a Slovenian company founded in 2003 that manufactures high-end computer water cooling, extreme cooling, and some air cooling components for CPUs, GPU, RAM, and SSDs. Their target audience consists of custom PC building enthusiasts and professionals, and the company offers a wide range of water-cooling products. EKWB sells its products through several authorized distributors worldwide, but also maintains its web store focused on direct-to-consumer sales. Its primary brand strategy makes use of influencer marketing to advertise products through sponsorships or review samples.

== History ==
EKWB was founded in 2003 by Edvard König, who wanted a better thermal and acoustic performance for his personal computer. As of 2011, EKWB was one of the three largest personal computer water-cooling companies. EKWB works with the overclocking community through forums to better understand the needs of its customers.

On April 20, 2024, it was reported by Gamers Nexus, a YouTube channel, that EKWB was undergoing a liquidity crisis, having left suppliers and staff unpaid. EKWB's founder and CEO, Edvard König, published a statement admitting to delayed payments and a lack of communication. Gamers Nexus has since reported that EKWB has allowed a hostile work environment to exist in its US subsidiary.

== Products ==
EKWB specialises in cooling supplies. Its product line includes: CPU water blocks, GPU water blocks, radiators, computer fans, AIO (All-in-one) liquid cooling sets and several accessories.

=== CPU water blocks ===
Currently, EKWB sells several CPU water cooling blocks, primarily the Supremacy and Quantum line of CPU blocks for a wide range of CPU sockets.

The EK-Supremacy EVO, EK-Supremacy MX and EK-Velocity have mounting kits available for Intel's Socket T, B, H, H2, H3, H4, R, R3 and R4. (N.B. Socket R2 is also compatible but was only used for certain server processors) and AMD's Socket 754, 939, 940, AM2(+), AM3(+), AM4, FM1 and FM2(+). The EK-Annihilator is required for Intel's server LGA 3647 and the EK-Supremacy sTR is required for AMD's EPYC and Threadripper CPUs mounting holes, respectively.

EKWB also sells a range of Monoblocks, and CPU blocks that are much larger and also cool the motherboard's VRM to ensure that it does not overheat from high load. These monoblocks are based on the EK-Supremacy EVO.

EKWB often works in collaboration with computer hardware brands such as Asus, MSI and Gigabyte to bring custom monoblocks to their high-end gaming motherboards and GPUs. Those custom-built blocks will usually have cooling for the CPU, VRMs, M.2 slot and chipset/southbridge. Those blocks are sold as part of their respective motherboards or GPUs, rather than as a separate aftermarket part by EKWB.

Blocks are offered in a number of finishes, with interchangeable top parts. Blocks are made from copper (or in the Fluid Gaming case aluminium) and either left as bare copper, nickel-plated or gold-plated. The block's top, as They call it, are made from either nickel-plated brass, Acetal (usually black, though white is an option) or plexi tops (both clear and colour tinted).

In late 2021, EKWB announced the launch of a new AMD AM4 socket-based monoblock belonging to the Quantum Line of products, the EK-Quantum Momentum² ROG Strix X570-I Gaming D-RGB. This monoblock is engineered specifically for the ROG Strix X570-I Gaming ITX motherboard from ASUS. The addressable D-RGB LED in the monoblock is compatible with ASUS Aura Sync RGB control and offers a full lighting customization experience for every single diode at any given time. This monoblock is EK-Matrix7 compatible.

=== GPU water blocks ===
EKWB produces both universal GPU water blocks, that only cool the GPU's silicon die, as well as full-cover water blocks that cool the die, VRAM and VRMs. EKWB makes many versions of so-called AIB partner cards custom PCB versions of the standard video card, which have different PCB layouts. Full cover blocks are not compatible with different versions, even with the same GPU core, e.g. a block for a Nvidia GeForce GTX 1080 Founders Edition will not work with an ASUS ROG Strix version of the GeForce GTX 1080.

EKWB Universal GPU blocks are marketed as EK-VGA Supremacy for a single graphics card setup, and a larger version called EK-Thermosphere is designed for use with more than one graphics card. These blocks only cool the GPU core and usually leave the VRAM and VRMs on a card to be cooled by air. Should a user fail to ensure these vital parts of the card are also cooled, either by placing a fan to direct air over them, or by the use of stick-on heat sinks, the card can shut down, or die even, from overheating.

Just like the CPU blocks, the company offers the blocks in different style offerings in both bare copper and nickel plating, and cover plates made from Acetal or Plexi.

=== RAM water blocks ===
EKWB offers water blocks for RAM DIMM modules, marketed as EK-RAM Monarch. Due to the tight spaces involved in RAM DIMM layouts on modern PCs, the water blocks do not sit directly on the RAM modules, but rather connect to special heat spreaders attached to the DIMMs, they then screw into the RAM block which sits on top and is thermally connected via TIM. They sell these blocks in two DIMM versions. They are available as both bare copper and nickel-plated copper, as well as in acetal and plexi versions. The heat spreaders are offered in aluminium with black or nickel finishes.

=== PC case fans ===
EKWB has its range of fans specially designed for use with PC water cooling radiators. These fans are designed to produce high static pressure with low noise, providing increased efficiency in the movement of air through a radiator when compared to an 'ordinary' case fan. These fans are available in several colour combinations, rotational speeds, and in sizes of 120 mm and 140 mm, the main two PC fan sizes.

=== PC water cooling radiators ===
EKWB offer radiators in a number of sizes and thicknesses, marketed as 'Quantum Surface'. Its 120 mm radiator options as single-fan (120 mm x 120 mm), dual-fan (240 mm x 120 mm), triple-fan (360 mm x 120 mm) and quad-fan (480 mm x 120 mm) placed in thicknesses of 30 mm (S line), 44 mm (P line) and 58 mm (X line). For 140 mm radiator options, there are single-fan (140 mm x 140 mm), dual-fan (280 mm x 140 mm), triple-fan (420 mm x 140 mm) and quad-fan (560 mm x 140 mm) placed in thicknesses of 30 mm (S line), 44 mm (P line) and 58 mm (X line).
