= Water cooling =

Method of heat removal from components and industrial equipment

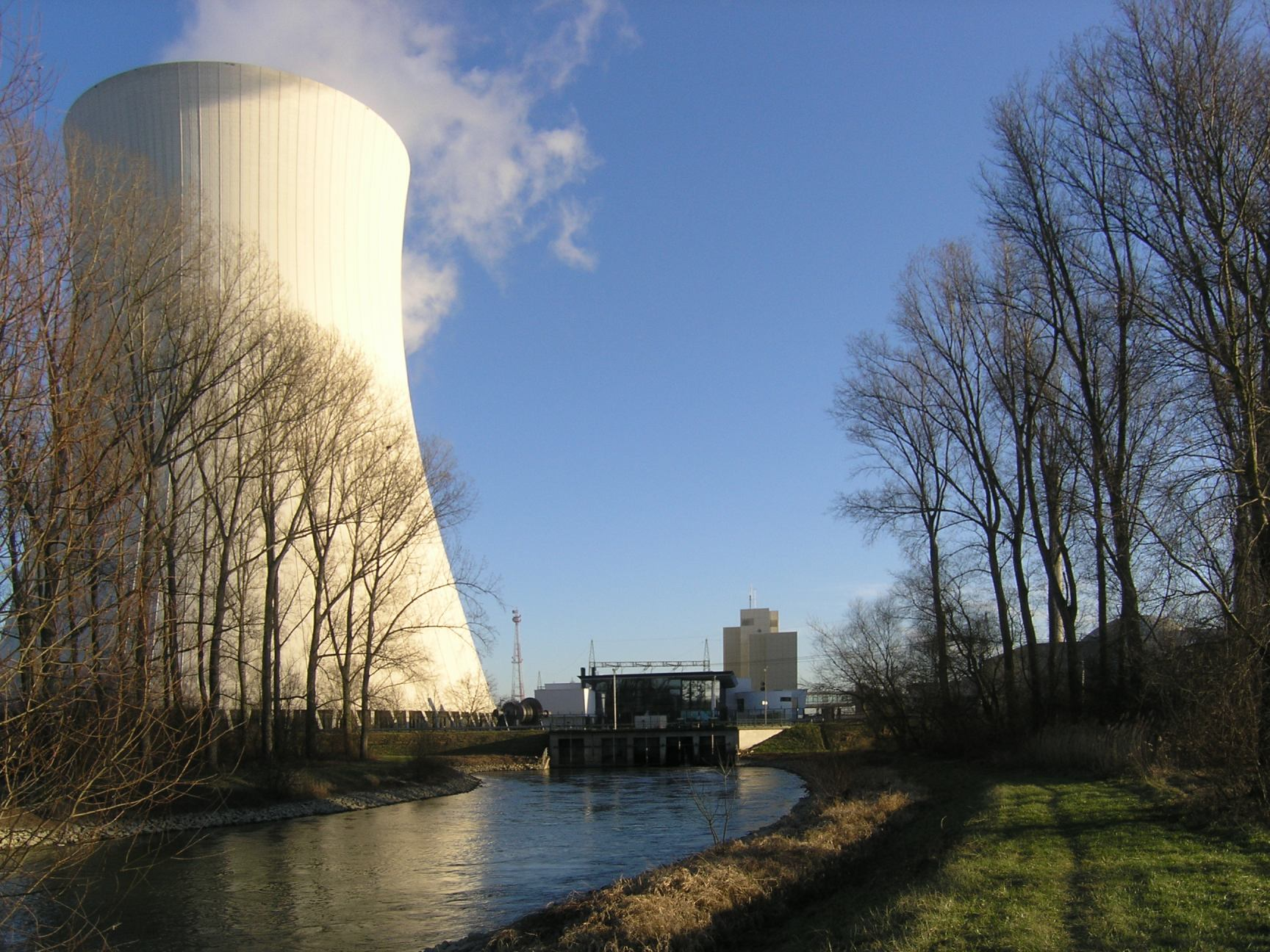
Cooling tower and water discharge of a nuclear power plant

Water cooling is a method of heat removal from components and industrial equipment. Evaporative cooling using water is often more efficient than air cooling. Water is inexpensive and non-toxic; however, it can contain impurities and cause corrosion.

Water cooling is commonly used for cooling automobile internal combustion engines and power stations. Water coolers utilising convective heat transfer are used inside some high-end personal computers to further lower the temperature of CPUs and other components compared to air cooling.

Other uses include the cooling of lubricant oil in pumps; for cooling purposes in heat exchangers; for cooling buildings in HVAC and in chillers.

== Mechanism ==
=== Advantages ===
Water is inexpensive, non-toxic, and available over most of the earth's surface. Liquid cooling offers higher thermal conductivity than air cooling. Water has unusually high specific heat capacity among commonly available liquids at room temperature and atmospheric pressure allowing efficient heat transfer over distance with low rates of mass transfer. Cooling water may be recycled through a recirculating system or used in a single-pass once-through cooling (OTC) system. Water's high enthalpy of vaporization allows the option of efficient evaporative cooling to remove waste heat in cooling towers or cooling ponds. Recirculating systems are open if they rely upon evaporative cooling or closed if heat removal is accomplished in heat exchangers, thus with negligible evaporative loss. A heat exchanger or condenser may separate non-contact cooling water from a fluid being cooled, or contact cooling water may directly impinge on items like saw blades where phase difference allows easy separation. Environmental regulations emphasize the reduced concentrations of waste products in non-contact cooling water.

=== Disadvantages ===
Water accelerates the corrosion of metal parts and is a favorable medium for biological growth. Dissolved minerals in natural water supplies are concentrated by evaporation to leave deposits called scale. Cooling water often requires the addition of chemicals to minimize corrosion and insulating deposits of scale and biofouling.

Water contains varying amounts of impurities from contact with the atmosphere, soil, and containers. Being both an electrical conductor and a solvent for metal ions and oxygen, water can accelerate corrosion of machinery being cooled. Corrosion reactions proceed more rapidly as temperature increases. Preservation of machinery in the presence of hot water has been improved by addition of corrosion inhibitors including zinc, chromates and phosphates. The first two have toxicity concerns; and the last has been associated with eutrophication. Residual concentrations of biocides and corrosion inhibitors are of potential concern for OTC and blowdown from open recirculating cooling water systems. With the exception of machines with short design life, closed recirculating systems require periodic cooling-water treatment or replacement raising similar concern about ultimate disposal of cooling water containing chemicals used with environmental safety assumptions of a closed system.

Biofouling occurs because water is a favorable environment for many life forms. Flow characteristics of recirculating cooling water systems encourage colonization by sessile organisms using the circulating supply of food, oxygen and nutrients. Temperatures may become high enough to support thermophilic populations of organisms such as types of fungi. Biofouling of heat exchange surfaces can reduce heat transfer rates of the cooling system, and biofouling of cooling towers can alter flow distribution to reduce evaporative cooling rates. Biofouling may also create differential oxygen concentrations increasing corrosion rates. OTC and open recirculating systems are more susceptible to biofouling. Biofouling may be inhibited by temporary habitat modifications. Temperature differences may discourage the establishment of thermophilic populations in intermittently operated facilities, and intentional short-term temperature spikes may periodically kill less tolerant populations. Biocides have been commonly used to control biofouling where sustained facility operation is required.

Chlorine may be added in the form of hypochlorite to decrease biofouling in cooling water systems, but is later reduced to chloride to minimize the toxicity of blowdown or OTC water returned to natural aquatic environments. Hypochlorite is increasingly destructive to wooden cooling towers as pH increases. Chlorinated phenols have been used as biocides or leached from preserved wood in cooling towers. Both hypochlorite and pentachlorophenol have reduced effectiveness at pH values greater than 8. Non-oxidizing biocides may be more difficult to detoxify prior to release of blowdown or OTC water to natural aquatic environments.

Concentrations of polyphosphates or phosphonates with zinc and chromates or similar compounds have been maintained in cooling systems to keep heat exchange surfaces clean enough that a film of gamma iron oxide and zinc phosphate can inhibit corrosion by passivating anodic and cathodic reaction points. These increase salinity and total dissolved solids, and phosphorus compounds may provide the limiting essential nutrient for algal growth contributing to biofouling of the cooling system or to eutrophication of natural aquatic environments receiving blowdown or OTC water. Chromates reduce biofouling in addition to effective corrosion inhibition in the cooling water system, but residual toxicity in blowdown or OTC water has encouraged lower chromate concentrations and the use of less-flexible corrosion inhibitors. Blowdown may also contain chromium leached from cooling towers constructed of wood preserved with chromated copper arsenate.

Total dissolved solids or TDS (sometimes called filterable residue) is reported as the mass of residue remaining when a measured volume of filtered water is evaporated. Salinity indicates water density or conductivity changes caused by dissolved materials. Probability of scale formation increases with increasing total dissolved solids. Solids commonly associated with scale formation are calcium and magnesium both as carbonate and sulfate. Corrosion rates initially increase with salinity in response to increasing electrical conductivity, but then decrease after reaching a peak as higher levels of salinity decrease dissolved oxygen levels.

Some groundwater contains very little oxygen when pumped from wells, but most natural water supplies include dissolved oxygen. Increasing oxygen concentrations accelerate corrosion. Dissolved oxygen approaches saturation levels in cooling towers. It is beneficial in blowdown or OTC water being returned to natural aquatic environments.

Water ionizes into hydronium (H_{3}O^{+}) cations and hydroxide (OH^{−}) anions. The concentration of ionized hydrogen (as protonated water) in a cooling water system is reported as the pH level. Low pH values increase the rate of corrosion; high pH values encourage scale formation. Amphoterism is uncommon among metals used in water cooling systems, but aluminum corrosion rates increase with pH values above 9. Galvanic corrosion may be severe in water systems with copper and aluminum components. Acid can be added to cooling water systems to prevent scale formation if the pH decrease will offset increased salinity and dissolved solids.

== Steam power stations ==
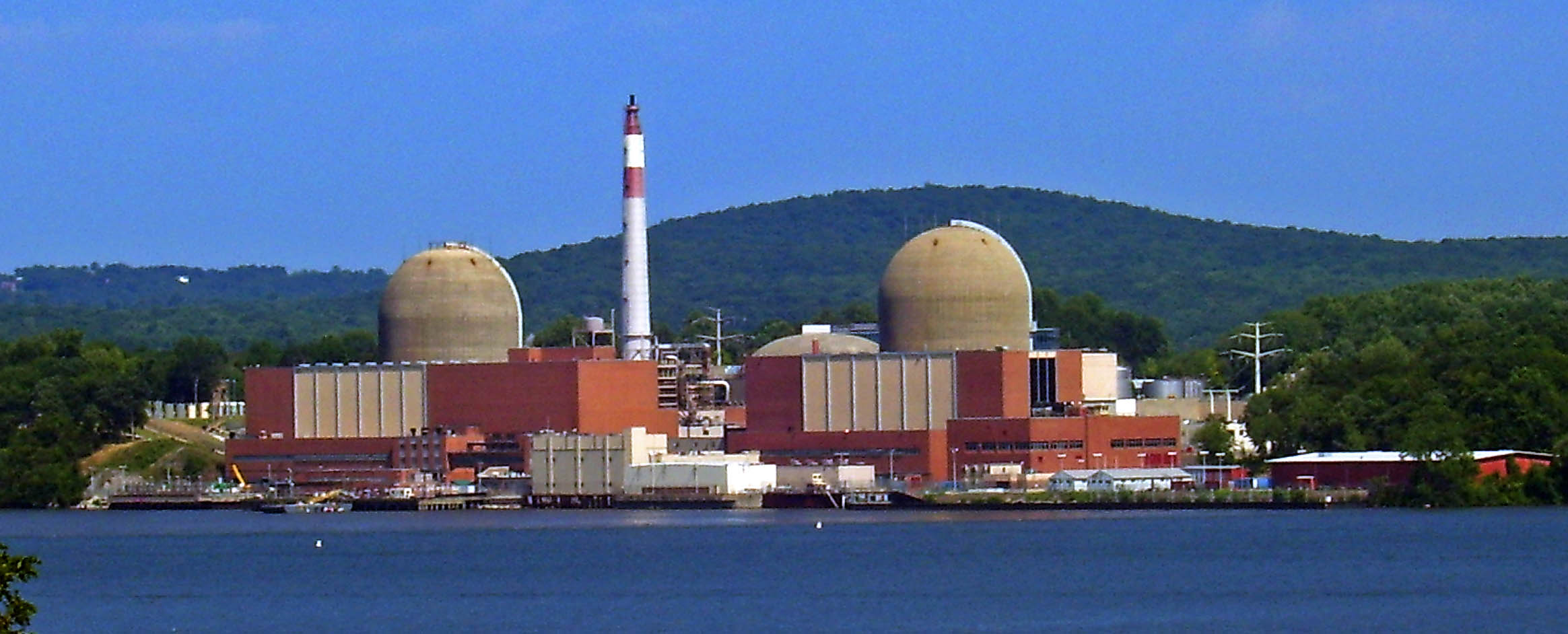
The Indian Point Energy Center. Over a billion fish eggs and larvae are killed in its cooling system each year.

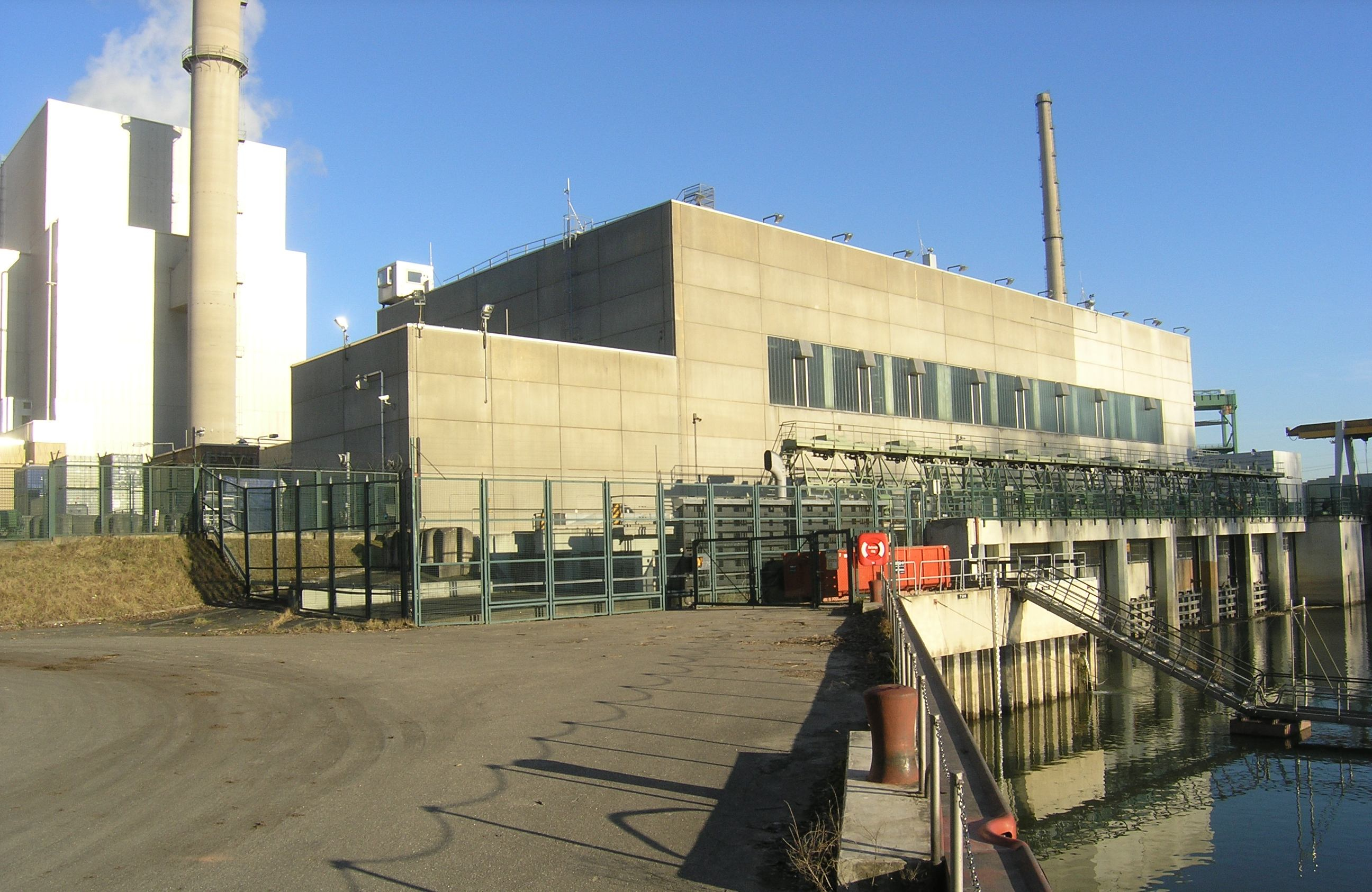
Cooling water intake of a nuclear power plant

Few other cooling applications approach the large volumes of water required to condense low-pressure steam at power stations. Many facilities, particularly electric power plants, use millions of gallons of water per day for cooling. Water cooling on this scale may alter natural water environments and create new environments. Thermal pollution of rivers, estuaries and coastal waters is a consideration when siting such plants. Water returned to aquatic environments at temperatures higher than the ambient receiving water modifies aquatic habitat by increasing biochemical reaction rates and decreasing the oxygen saturation capacity of the habitat. Temperature increases initially favor a population shift from species requiring the high-oxygen concentration of cold water to those enjoying the advantages of increased metabolic rates in warm water.

Once-through cooling (OTC) systems may be used on very large rivers or at coastal and estuarine sites. These power stations put the waste heat into the river or coastal water. These OTC systems thus rely upon an ample supply of river water or seawater for their cooling needs. Such facilities are built with intake structures designed for bringing in large volumes of water at a high rate of flow. These structures tend to also pull in large numbers of fish and other aquatic organisms, which are killed or injured on the intake screens. Large flow rates may trap slow-swimming organisms including fish and shrimp on screens protecting the small bore tubes of the heat exchangers from blockage. High temperatures or pump turbulence and shear may kill or disable smaller organisms that pass through the screens entrained with the cooling water. More than 1,200 power plants and manufacturing facilities in the U.S. use OTC systems; the intake structures kill billions of fish and other organisms each year. More-agile aquatic predators consume organisms impinged on the screens; and warm water predators and scavengers colonize the cooling water discharge to feed on entrained organisms.

The U.S. Clean Water Act required the Environmental Protection Agency (EPA) to issue regulations on industrial cooling water intake structures. EPA issued final regulations for new facilities in 2001 (amended 2003), and for existing facilities in 2014.

=== Cooling towers ===
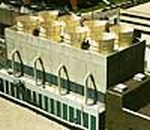
A Marley mechanical induced draft cooling tower

As an alternative to OTC, industrial cooling towers may use recirculated river water, coastal water (seawater), or well water. Large mechanical induced-draft or forced-draft cooling towers in industrial plants continuously circulate cooling water through heat exchangers and other equipment where the water absorbs heat. That heat is then rejected to the atmosphere by the evaporation of some of the water in cooling towers where upflowing air contacts the downflowing water. The loss of evaporated water into the air exhausted to the atmosphere is replaced by "make-up" fresh river water or fresh cooling water, but the amount of water lost during evaporative cooling may affect the natural habitat for aquatic organisms. Because the evaporated pure water is replaced by make-up water containing carbonates and other dissolved salts, a portion of the circulating water is continuously discarded as "blowdown" water to minimize the excessive build-up of salts in the circulating water; these blowdown wastes may change the receiving water quality.

== Internal combustion engines ==
The heated coolant mixture can be used to warm the air inside the car by means of the heater core. Also, the water jacket around an engine is very effective at deadening mechanical noises, making the engine quieter.

=== Open method ===
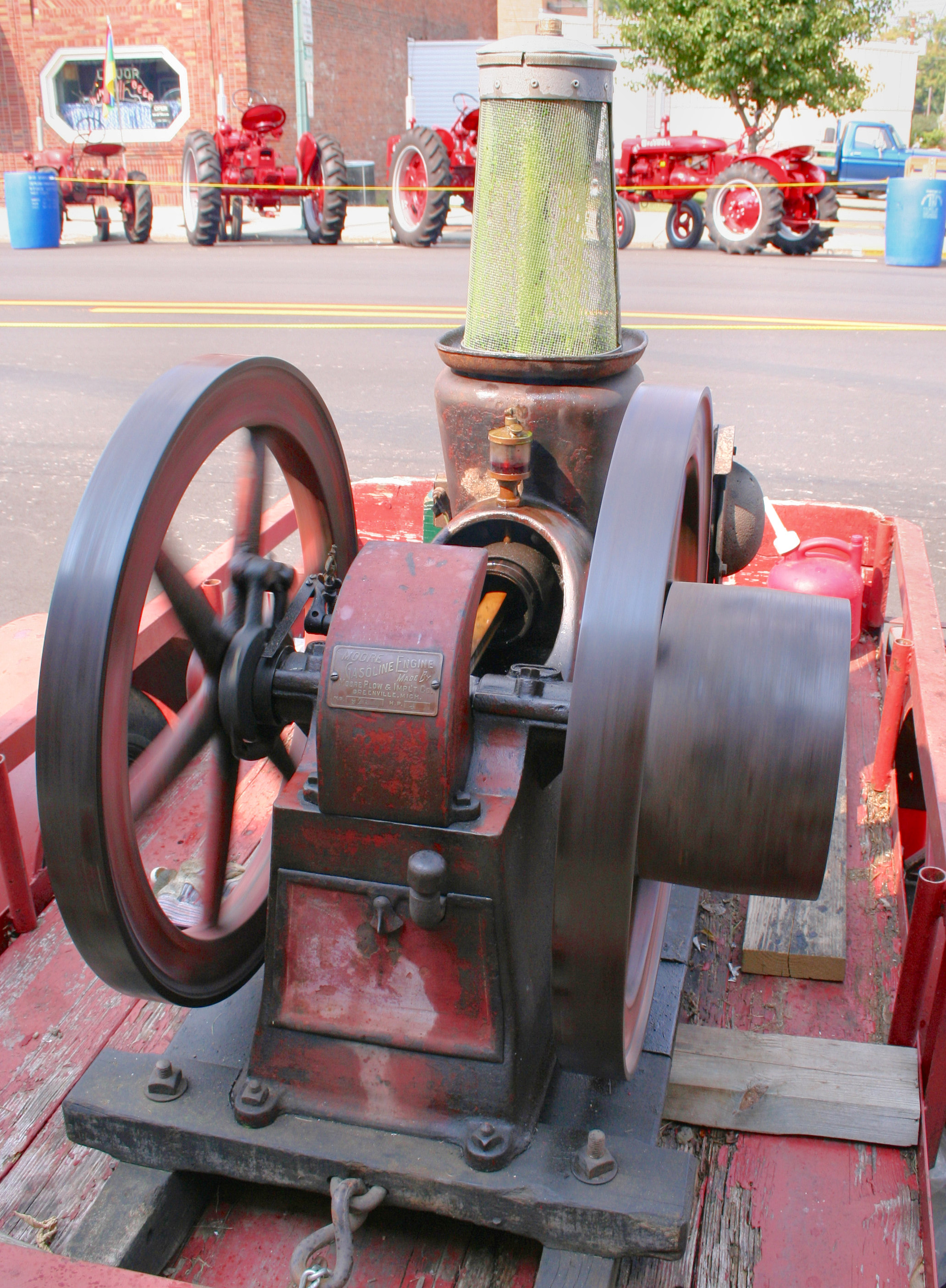
An antique gasoline engine with an evaporative cooler and mesh screen to improve evaporation. Water is pumped up to the top and flows down the screen to the tank.

An open water cooling system makes use of evaporative cooling, lowering the temperature of the remaining (unevaporated) water. This method was common in early internal combustion engines until scale buildup was observed from dissolved salts and minerals in the water. Modern open cooling systems continuously waste a fraction of recirculating water as blowdown to remove dissolved solids at concentrations low enough to prevent scale formation. Some open systems use inexpensive tap water, but this requires higher blowdown rates than deionized or distilled water. Purified water systems still require blowdown to remove the accumulation of byproducts of chemical treatment to prevent corrosion and biofouling.

=== Pressurization ===
Water for cooling has a boiling point temperature of around 100 degrees C at atmospheric pressure. Engines operating at higher temperatures may require a pressurized recycle loop to prevent overheating. Modern automotive cooling systems often operate at 15 psi (103 kPa) to raise the boiling-point of the recycling water coolant and reduce evaporative losses.

=== Antifreeze ===
The use of water cooling carries the risk of damage from freezing. Automotive and many other engine cooling applications require the use of a water and antifreeze mixture to lower the freezing point to a temperature unlikely to be experienced. Antifreeze also inhibits corrosion from dissimilar metals and can increase the boiling point, allowing a wider range of water cooling temperatures. Its distinctive odor also alerts operators to cooling system leaks and problems that would go unnoticed in a water-only cooling system.

=== Other additives ===
Other less common chemical additives are products to reduce surface tension. These additives are meant to increase the efficiency of automotive cooling systems. Such products are used to enhance the cooling of underperforming or undersized cooling systems or in racing where the weight of a larger cooling system could be a disadvantage.

== Power electronics and transmitters ==
Since approximately 1930 it is common to use water cooling for tubes of powerful transmitters. As these devices use high operation voltages (around 10 kV), the use of deionized water is required and it has to be carefully controlled. Modern solid-state transmitters can be built so that even high-power transmitters do not require water cooling. Water cooling is however also sometimes used for thyristors of HVDC valves, for which the use of deionized water is required.

=== Liquid cooling maintenance ===
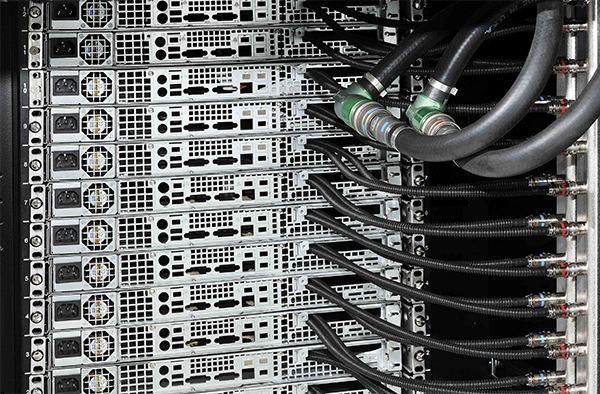
CoolIT Rack DCLC AHx Liquid Cooling Solution

Liquid cooling techniques are increasingly being used for the thermal management of electronic components. This type of cooling is a solution to ensure the optimisation of energy efficiency while simultaneously minimising noise and space requirements. Especially useful in supercomputers or Data Centers because maintenance of the racks is quick and easy. After disassembly of the rack, advanced-technology quick-release couplings eliminate spillage for the safety of operators and protect the integrity of fluids (no impurities in the circuits). These couplings are also capable of being locked (Panel mounted?) to allow blind connection in difficult-to-access areas. It is important in electronics technology to analyse the connection systems to ensure:

- Non-spill sealing (clean break, flush face couplings)
- Compact and lightweight (materials in special aluminum alloys)
- Operator safety (disconnection without spillage)
- Quick-release couplings sized for optimized flow
- Connection guiding system and compensation of misalignment during connection on rack systems
- Excellent resistance to vibration and corrosion
- Designed to withstand a large number of connections even on refrigerant circuits under residual pressure

== Computers ==
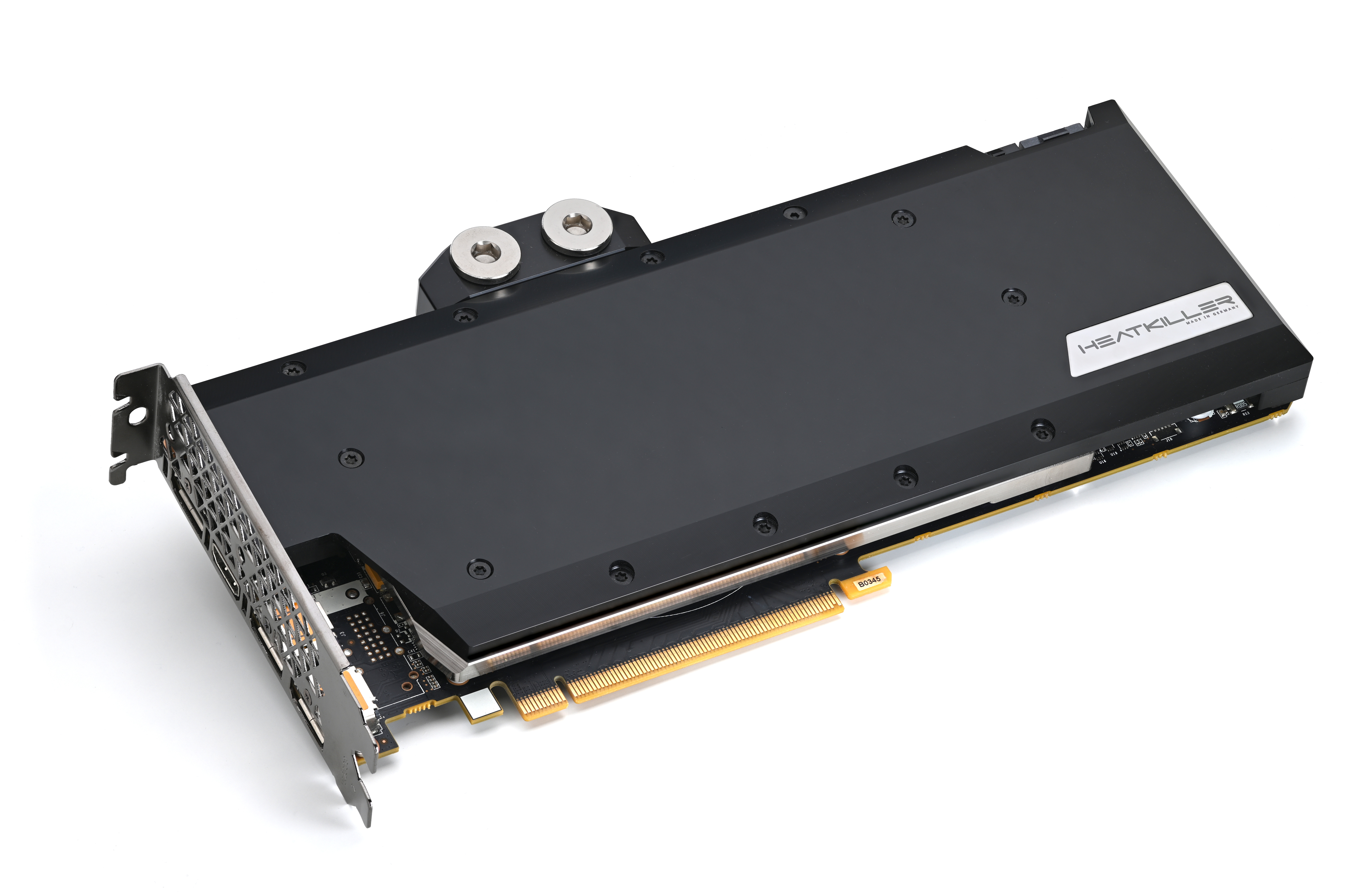
GPU waterblock on an Nvidia 1080 Ti

This 60 mm diameter by 10 mm high impingement-type water-cooled copper cold plate (heat sink) animation shows temperature contoured flow trajectories, predicted using a CFD analysis package.

Water cooling often adds complexity and cost in comparison to air cooling design by requiring a pump, tubing or piping to transport the water, and a radiator, often with fans, to reject the heat to the atmosphere. Depending on the application, water cooling may create an additional element of risk where leakage from the water coolant recycle loop can corrode or short-circuit sensitive electronic components.

The primary advantage of water cooling for cooling CPU cores in computing equipment is transporting heat away from the source to a secondary cooling surface to allow for large, more optimally designed radiators rather than small, relatively inefficient fins mounted directly on the heat source. Cooling hot computer components with various fluids has been in use since at least the Cray-2 in 1982, which used Fluorinert. Through the 1990s, water cooling for home PCs slowly gained recognition among enthusiasts, but it became noticeably more prevalent after the introduction of the first Gigahertz-clocked processors in the early 2000s. As of 2018, there are dozens of manufacturers of water cooling components and kits, and many computer manufacturers include preinstalled water cooling solutions for their high-performance systems.

Water cooling can be used for many computer components, but usually it is used for the CPU and GPUs. Water cooling typically uses a water block, a water pump, and a water-to-air heat exchanger. By transferring device heat to a separate larger heat exchanger using larger, lower-speed fans, water cooling can allow quieter operation, improved processor speeds (overclocking), or a balance of both. Less commonly, Northbridges, Southbridges, hard disk drives, memory, voltage regulator modules (VRMs), and even power supplies can be water-cooled.

Internal radiator size may vary: from 40 mm dual fan (80 mm) to 140 quad fan (560 mm) and thickness from 30 mm to 80 mm. Radiator fans may be mounted on one or both sides. External radiators can be much larger than their internal counterparts as they do not need to fit in the confines of a computer case. High-end cases may have two rubber grommeted ports in the back for the inlet and outlet hoses, which allow external radiators to be placed far away from the PC.

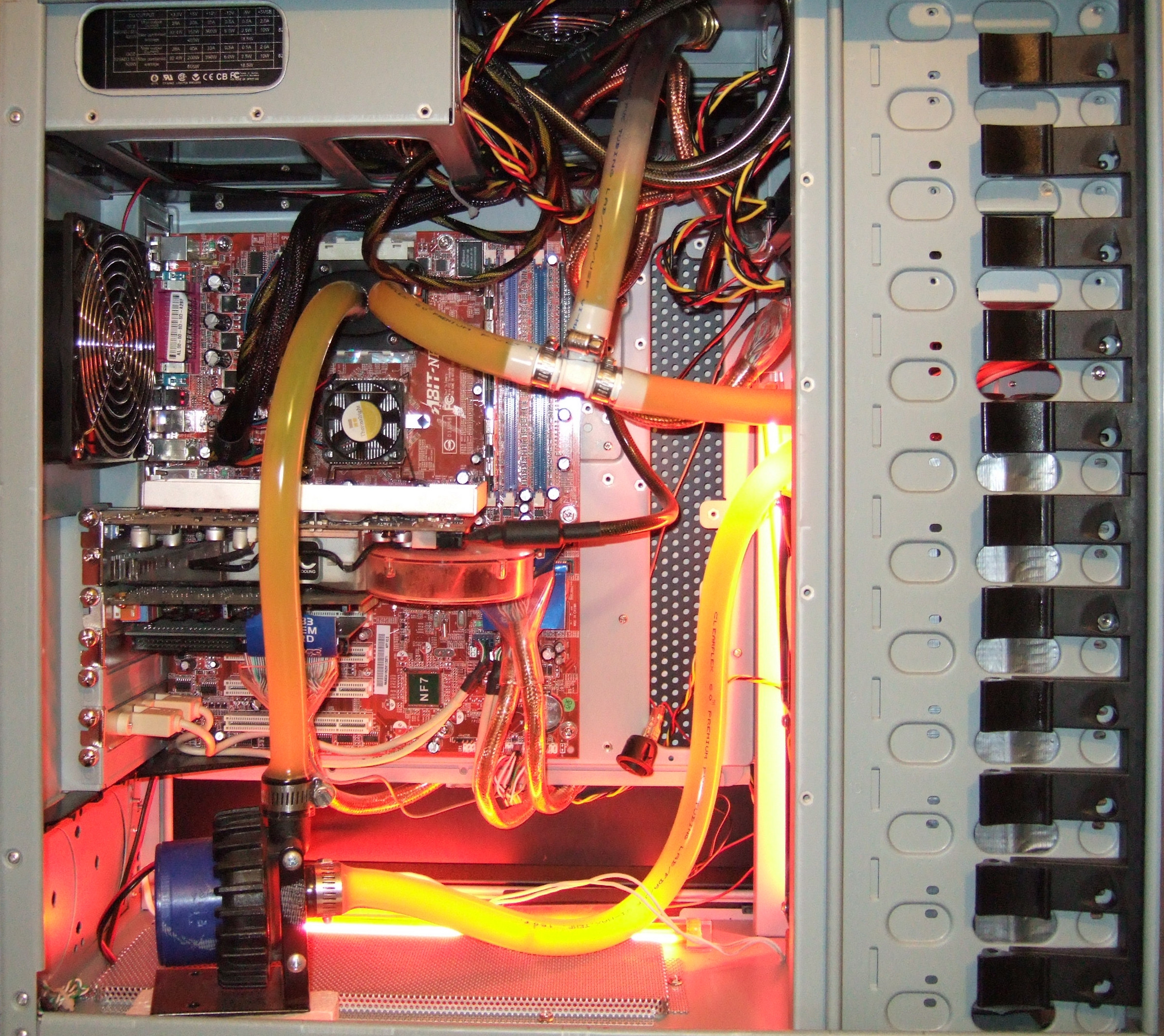
Typical 2000s single-waterblock DIY watercooling setup in a PC utilizing a T-Line

A T-Line is used to remove trapped air bubbles from the circulating water. It is made with a t-connector and a capped-off length of tubing. The tube n acts as a mini-reservoir and allows air bubbles to travel into it as they are caught into the "tee" connector, and ultimately removed from the system by bleeding. The capped line may be capped with a fill-port fitting to allow the release of trapped gas and the addition of liquid.

Water coolers for desktop computers were, until the end of the 1990s, homemade. They were made from car radiators (or more commonly, a car's heater core), aquarium pumps and home-made water blocks, laboratory-grade PVC and silicone tubing and various reservoirs (homemade using plastic bottles, or constructed using cylindrical acrylic or sheets of acrylic, usually clear) and or a T-Line. More recently a growing number of companies are manufacturing water-cooling components compact enough to fit inside a computer case. This, and the trend to CPUs of higher power dissipation, has greatly increased the popularity of water cooling.

Dedicated overclockers have occasionally used vapor-compression refrigeration or thermoelectric coolers in place of more common standard heat exchangers. Water cooling systems in which water is cooled directly by the evaporator coil of a phase change system are able to chill the circulating coolant below the ambient air temperature (impossible with a standard heat exchanger) and, as a result, generally provide superior cooling of the computer's heat-generating components. The downside of phase-change or thermoelectric cooling is that it uses much more electricity, and antifreeze must be added due to the low temperature. Additionally, insulation, usually in the form of lagging around water pipes and neoprene pads around the components to be cooled, must be used in order to prevent damage caused by condensation of water vapour from the air on chilled surfaces. Common places from which to obtain the required phase transition systems are a household dehumidifier or air conditioner.

An alternative cooling scheme, which also enables components to be cooled below the ambient temperature while obviating the requirement for antifreeze and lagged pipes, is to place a thermoelectric device (commonly referred to as a 'Peltier junction' or 'pelt' after Jean Peltier, who documented the effect) between the heat-generating component and the water block. Because the only sub-ambient temperature zone now is at the interface with the heat-generating component itself, insulation is required only in that localized area. The disadvantage of such a system is higher power dissipation.

To avoid damage from condensation around the Peltier junction, a proper installation requires it to be "potted" with silicone epoxy. The epoxy is applied around the edges of the device, preventing air from entering or leaving the interior.

Apple's Power Mac G5 was the first mainstream desktop computer to have water cooling as standard (although only on its fastest models). Dell followed suit by shipping their XPS computers with liquid cooling, using thermoelectric cooling to help cool the liquid. Currently, Dell's only computers to offer liquid cooling are their Alienware desktops.

Asus are the first and only mainstream brand to have put water-cooled laptops into mass production. Those laptops have a built-in air/water hybrid cooling system and can be docked to an external liquid cooling radiator for additional cooling and electrical power.

== Ships and boats ==
Water is an ideal cooling medium for vessels as they are constantly surrounded by water that generally remains at a low temperature throughout the year. Systems operating with seawater need to be manufactured from cupronickel, bronze, titanium or similarly corrosion-resistant materials. Water containing sediment may require velocity restrictions through piping to avoid erosion at high velocity or blockage by settling at low velocity.

== Other applications ==
Plant transpiration and animal perspiration use evaporative cooling to prevent high temperatures from causing unsustainable metabolic rates.

Machine guns used in fixed defensive positions sometimes use water cooling to extend barrel life through periods of rapid fire, but the weight of the water and pumping system significantly reduces the portability of water-cooled firearms. Water-cooled machine guns were extensively used by both sides during World War I; however, by the end of the war lighter weapons that rivaled the firepower, effectiveness and reliability of water-cooled models began to appear on the battlefield. Thus water-cooled weapons have played a far lesser role in subsequent conflicts.

A hospital in Sweden relies on snow-cooling from melt-water to cool its data centers, medical equipment, and maintain a comfortable ambient temperature.

Some nuclear reactors use heavy water as coolant. Heavy water is employed in nuclear reactors because it is a weaker neutron absorber. This allows for the use of less-enriched fuel. For the main cooling system, normal water is preferably employed through the use of a heat exchanger, as heavy water is much more expensive. Reactors that use other materials for moderation (graphite) may also use normal water for cooling.

High-grade industrial water (produced by reverse osmosis or distillation) and potable water are sometimes used in industrial plants requiring high-purity cooling water. Production of these high-purity waters creates waste byproduct brines containing the concentrated impurities from the source water.

In 2018, researchers from the University of Colorado Boulder and University of Wyoming invented a radiative cooling metamaterial known as "RadiCold", which has been developed since 2017. This metamaterial aids in cooling of water and increasing the efficiency of power generation, in which it would cool the underneath objects, by reflecting away the sun's rays while at the same time allowing the surface to discharge its heat as infrared thermal radiation.

== See also ==
- Cooling pond
- Deep lake water cooling
- Free cooling
- Full immersion cooling
- Heat pipe cooling
- Hopper cooling
- Oil cooling
- Peltier cooling
- Thermosiphon (passive heat exchange)

== Bibliography ==
- Handbook of Industrial Water Conditioning (7th ed.). Betz Laboratories. 1976.
- Franson, Mary Ann (1975). Standard Methods for the Examination of Water and Wastewater (14th ed.). APHA, AWWA & WPCF. ISBN 0-87553-078-8.
- Goldman, Charles R.; Horne, Alexander J. (1983). Limnology. McGraw-Hill. ISBN 0-07-023651-8.
- Kemmer, Frank N. (1979). The NALCO Water Handbook. McGraw-Hill.
- King, James J. (1995). The Environmental Dictionary (3rd ed.). John Wiley & Sons. ISBN 0-471-11995-4.
- Reid, George K. (1961). Ecology in Inland Waters and Estuaries. Van Nostrand Reinhold.
