= Voltage regulator module =

Type of buck convertor for regulation

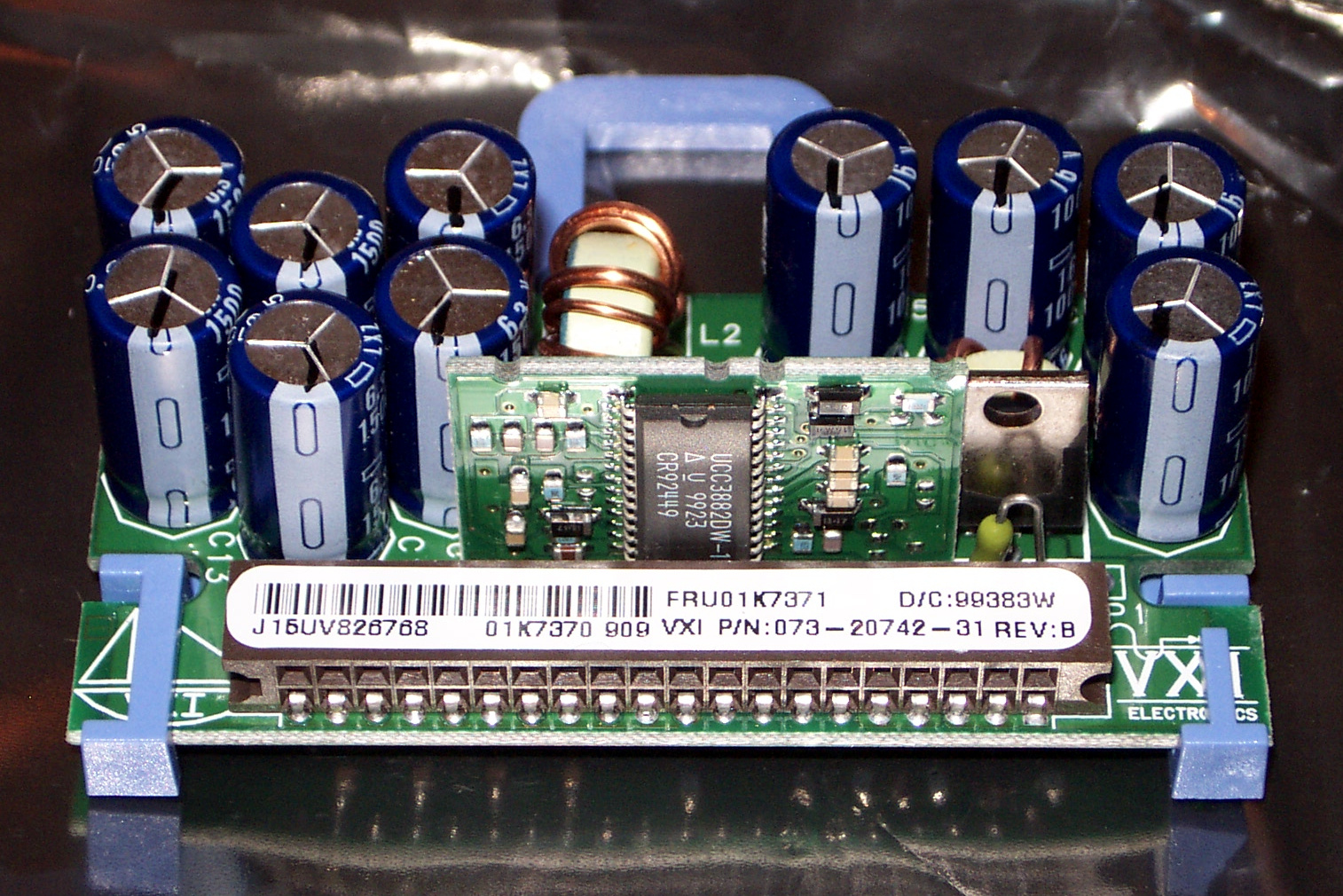
Voltage regulator module for an IBM Netfinity 7000 M10 server running an Intel Xeon 500 MHz processor

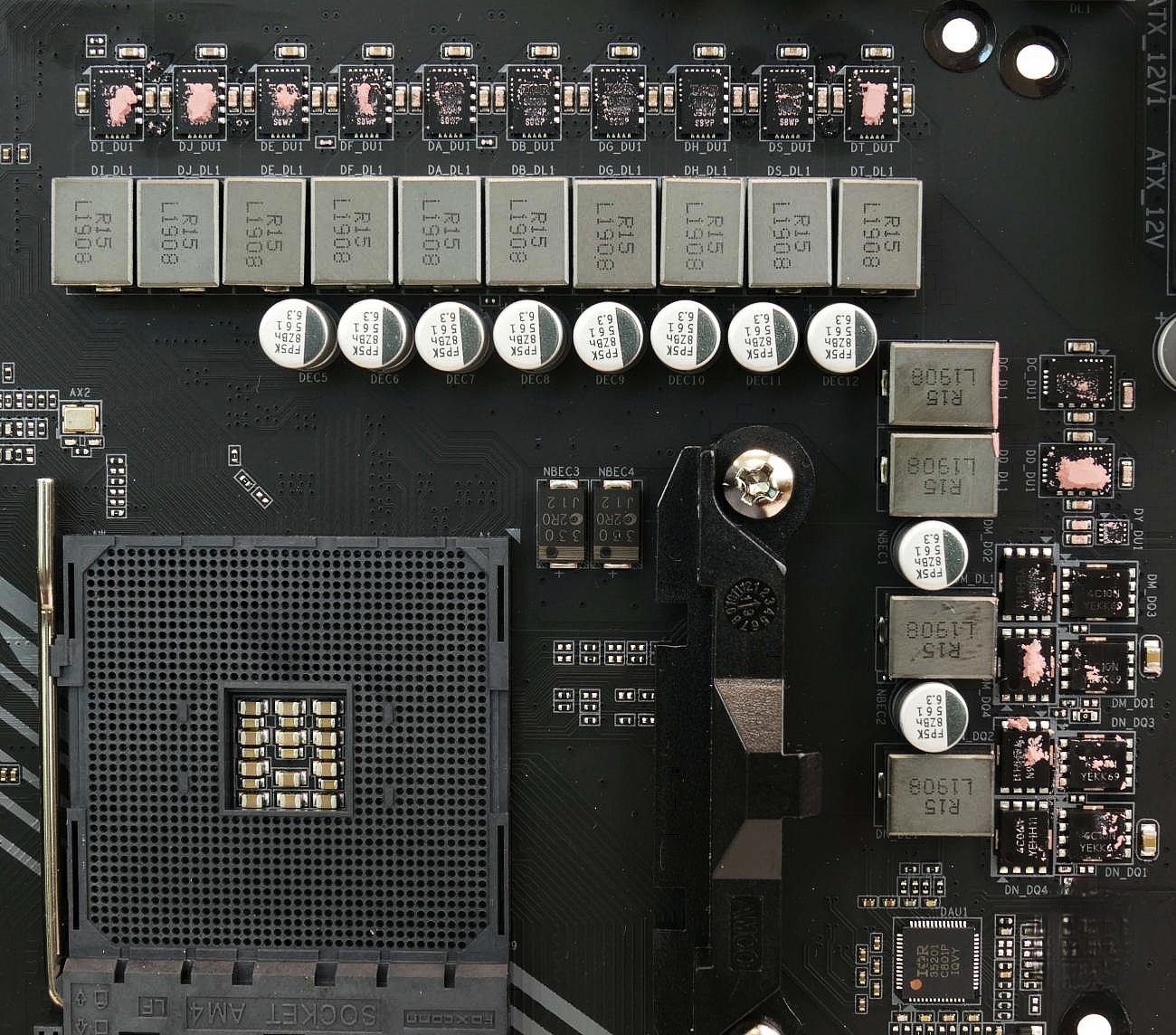
Voltage regulator module for a Gigabyte Aorus X570 motherboard running on AMD Socket AM4

A voltage regulator module (VRM), sometimes called processor power module (PPM), is a buck converter that provides the microprocessor and chipset the appropriate supply voltage, converting +3.3 V, +5 V or +12 V to lower voltages required by the devices, allowing devices with different supply voltages be mounted on the same motherboard. On personal computer (PC) systems, the VRM is typically made up of power MOSFET devices.

== Overview ==
Haswell featured a FIVR.

Most voltage regulator module implementations are soldered onto the motherboard. Some processors, such as Intel Haswell and Ice Lake CPUs, feature some voltage regulation components on the same CPU package, reduce the VRM design of the motherboard; such a design brings certain levels of simplification to complex voltage regulation involving numerous CPU supply voltages and dynamic powering up and down of various areas of a CPU. A voltage regulator integrated on-package or on-die is usually referred to as fully integrated voltage regulator (FIVR) or simply an integrated voltage regulator (IVR).

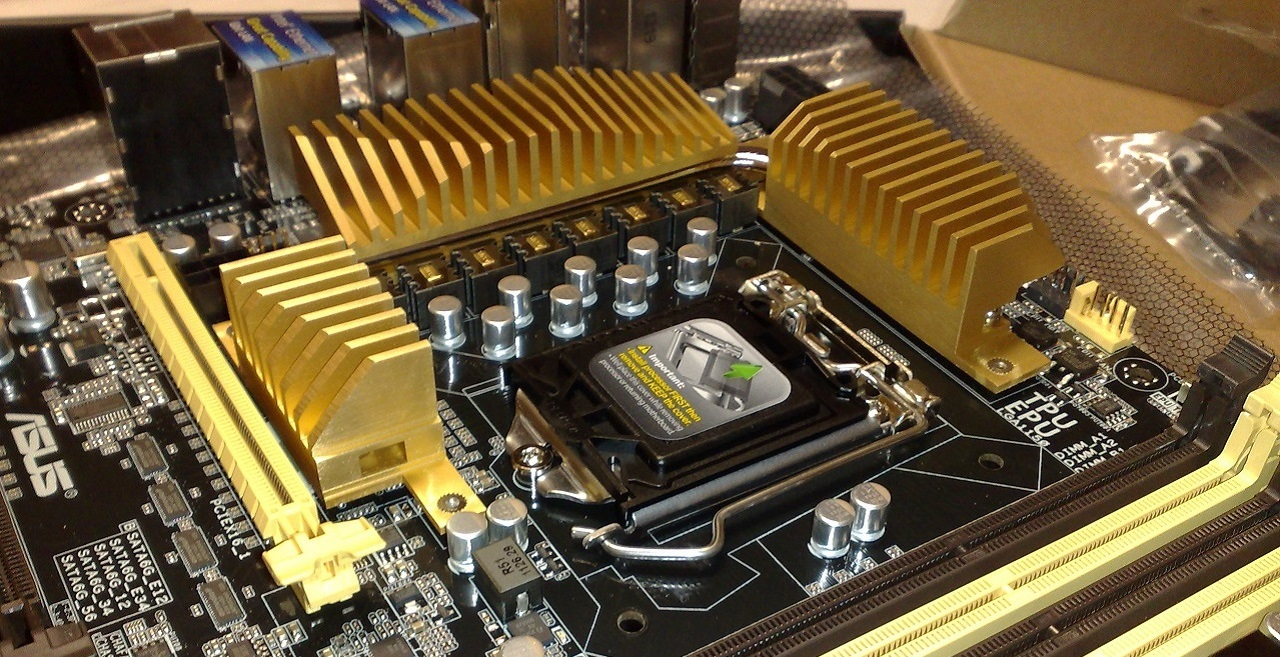
Voltage regulator module (parts external to the processor's fully integrated voltage regulator) on a computer motherboard, covered with heat sinks

Most modern CPUs require less than 1.5 V, as CPU designers tend to use lower CPU core voltages; lower voltages help in reducing CPU power dissipation, which is often specified through thermal design power (TDP) that serves as the nominal value for designing CPU cooling systems.

Some voltage regulators provide a fixed supply voltage to the processor, but most of them sense the required supply voltage from the processor, essentially acting as a continuously-variable adjustable regulator. In particular, VRMs that are soldered to the motherboard are supposed to do the sensing, according to the Intel specification.

Modern video cards also use a VRM due to higher power and current requirements. These VRMs may generate a significant amount of heat and require heat sinks separate from the GPU.

== Voltage identification ==
The correct supply voltage and current is communicated by the microprocessor to the VRM at startup via a number of bits called VID (voltage identification definition). In particular, the VRM initially provides a standard supply voltage to the VID logic, which is the part of the processor whose only aim is to then send the VID to the VRM. When the VRM has received the VID identifying the required supply voltage, it starts acting as a voltage regulator, providing the required constant voltage and current supply to the processor.

Instead of having a power supply unit generate some fixed voltage, the CPU uses a small set of digital signals, the VID lines, to instruct an on-board power converter of the desired voltage level. The switch-mode buck converter then adjusts its output accordingly. The flexibility so obtained makes it possible to use the same power supply unit for CPUs with different nominal supply voltages and to reduce power consumption during idle periods by lowering the supply voltage.

For example, a unit with 5-bit VID would output one of at most 32 (2^{5}) distinct output voltages. These voltages are usually (but not always) evenly spaced within a given range. Some of the code words may be reserved for special functions such as shutting down the unit, hence a 5-bit VID unit may have fewer than 32 output voltage levels. How the numerical codes map to supply voltages is typically specified in tables provided by component manufacturers. Since 2008 VID comes in 5-, 6- and 8-bit varieties and is mostly applied to power modules outputting between 0.5 V and 3.5 V.

== VRM and overclocking ==
The VRMs are essential for overclocking. The quality of a VRM directly impacts the motherboard’s overclocking potential. The same overclocked processor can exhibit noticeable performance differences when paired with different VRMs. The reason for this is that a steady power supply is needed for successful overclocking. When a chip is pushed past its factory settings, that increases the power draw, so the VRM needs to match its output accordingly.

== See also ==
- Switched-mode power supply applications (SMPS) applications
- Pulse-width modulation
