= Double boot =

Bios

Double boot (also known as cold double boot, double cold boot, double POST, power-on auto reboot, or fake boot) is a feature of the BIOS, and may occur after changes to the BIOS' settings or the system's configuration, or a power failure while the system was in one of certain sleep modes.

Changing some parameters in the BIOS will cause this issue, even for items as simple as initializing the current CPU and memory clocks. At such times, a reboot will be required. If the computer did not have any power and had just been plugged in, the same parameters would need to be implemented again, and since these parameters require a reboot, the computer will do a quick reset to implement the parameters that are set in the BIOS. Even after the computer is turned off, these parameters will not need to be re-entered for as long as the power supply is still receiving power.

In a double boot, the PC will power on for about two seconds, off for about a second, turn back on, display the POST screen, and then continue to boot up normally.
