= Water block =

Heat exchanger used in liquid cooling

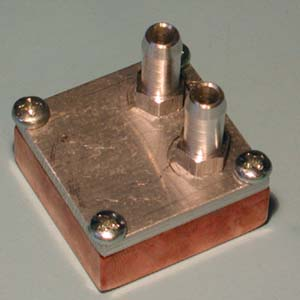

A water block is the watercooling equivalent of a heatsink. It is a type of plate heat exchanger and can be used on many different computer components, including the central processing unit (CPU), GPU, PPU, and northbridge chipset on the motherboard. There are also Monoblocks on the market that are mounted on PC motherboards and cover the CPU and its power delivery VRMs (Voltage Regulator Modules) that surround the CPU socket area. It consists of at least two main parts; the "base", which is the area that makes contact with the device being cooled and is usually manufactured from metals with high thermal conductivity such as aluminum or copper. The second part, the "top" ensures the water is contained safely inside the water block and has connections that allow hosing to connect it with the water cooling loop. The top can be made of the same metal as the base, transparent Perspex, Delrin, Nylon, or HDPE. Most newer high-end water blocks also contain mid-plates which serve to add jet tubes, nozzles, and other flow altering devices.

An exploded diagram of a simple waterblock

The base, top, and mid-plate(s) are sealed together to form a "block" with some sort of path for water to flow through. The ends of the path have inlet/outlet connectors for the tubing that connects it to the rest of the watercooling system. Early designs included spiral, zig-zag pattern or heatsink like fins to allow the largest possible surface area for heat to transfer from the device being cooled to the water. These designs generally were used because the conjecture was that maximum flow was required for high performance. Trial and error and the evolution of water block design has shown that trading flow for turbulence can often improve performance. The Storm series of water blocks is an example of this. Its jet tube mid plate and cupped base design makes it more restrictive to the flow of water than early maze designs but the increased turbulence results in a large increase in performance. Newer designs include "pin" style blocks, "jet cup" blocks, further refined maze designs, micro-fin designs, and variations on these designs. Increasingly restrictive designs have only been possible because of increases in maximum head pressure of commercially viable water pumps.

A water block is better at dissipating heat than an air-cooled heatsink due to water's higher specific heat capacity and thermal conductivity. The water is usually pumped through to a radiator which allows a fan pushing air through it to take the heat created from the device and expel it into the air. A radiator is more efficient than a standard CPU or GPU heatsink/air cooler at removing heat because it has a much larger surface area.

Installation of a water block is also similar to that of a heatsink, with a thermal pad or thermal paste placed between it and the device being cooled to aid in heat conduction.
