= 2025 Esbjerg municipal election =

Municipal election in Denmark

← 2021	18 November 2025	2029 →

All 31 seats to the Esbjerg municipal council 16 seats needed for a majority
- Turnout: 59,679 (65.1%) ▲0.9%
	First party	Second party	Third party
	V	A	C
Party	Venstre	Social Democrats	Conservatives
Last election	13 seats, 36.6%	9 seats, 27.4%	3 seats, 8.1%
Seats won	11	7	3
Seat change	▼2	▼2	0
Popular vote	19,051	13,541	5,386
Percentage	32.6%	23.2%	9.2%
Swing	▼4.0%	▼4.2%	▲1.1%
	Fourth party	Fifth party	Sixth party
	O	F	Æ
Party	Danish People's Party	Green Left	Denmark Democrats
Last election	1 seat, 3.7%	3 seats, 9.6%	Did not stand
Seats won	2	2	2
Seat change	▲1	▼1	▲2
Popular vote	4,248	4,240	3,275
Percentage	7.3%	7.3%	5.6%
Swing	▲3.6%	▼2.3%	New
	Seventh party	Eighth party	Ninth party
	Ø	I	B
Party	Red-Green Alliance	Liberal Alliance	Social Liberals
Last election	0 seats, 2.5%	0 seats, 0.7%	1 seat, 3.7%
Seats won	2	1	1
Seat change	▲2	▲1	0
Popular vote	2,920	2,390	1,691
Percentage	5.0%	4.1%	2.9%
Swing	▲2.5%	▲3.4%	▼0.8%
Mayor before election
Jesper Frost Rasmussen
Venstre
Mayor after election
Jesper Frost Rasmussen
Venstre

The 2025 Esbjerg Municipal election was held on November 18, 2025, to elect the 31 members to sit in the regional council for the Esbjerg Municipal council, in the Danish city and municipality of Esbjerg, for the period of 2026 to 2029. Jesper Frost Rasmussen from Venstre, would secure re-election and the mayoral position.

== Background ==
Following the 2021 election, Jesper Frost Rasmussen from Venstre became mayor for his second term. He sought a third term in this election.

== Electoral system ==
For elections to Danish municipalities, a number varying from 9 to 31 are chosen to be elected to the municipal council. The seats are then allocated using the D'Hondt method and a closed list proportional representation. Esbjerg Municipality had 31 seats in 2025.

== Electoral alliances ==
=== Electoral Alliance 1 ===
Party		Political alignment
B	Social Liberals	Centre to Centre-left
C	Conservatives	Centre-right
I	Liberal Alliance	Centre-right to Right-wing
V	Venstre	Centre-right
Æ	Denmark Democrats	Right-wing to Far-right

=== Electoral Alliance 2 ===
Party		Political alignment
E	Borgerlig Fornuft	Local politics
J	Esbjerg 2.0	Local politics

=== Electoral Alliance 3 ===
Party		Political alignment
F	Green Left	Centre-left to Left-wing
Ø	Red-Green Alliance	Left-wing to Far-Left
Å	The Alternative	Centre-left to Left-wing

=== Electoral Alliance 4 ===
Party		Political alignment
M	Moderates	Centre to Centre-right
O	Danish People's Party	Right-wing to Far-right

== Results by polling station ==
Division	A	B	C	E	F	I	J	L	M	O	V	Æ	Ø	Å
Division	%	%	%	%	%	%	%	%	%	%	%	%	%	%
Esbjerg Rådhus	19.5	3.8	11.0	1.1	8.0	6.1	0.3	0.4	1.4	6.5	30.1	3.7	7.8	0.3
Skovbo	28.9	3.7	6.6	1.5	7.6	4.7	0.5	0.7	2.0	9.9	23.6	4.5	5.6	0.3
Rørkjær	30.6	3.9	7.8	0.9	9.0	3.3	0.3	0.5	1.5	7.5	21.5	5.0	8.1	0.1
Jerne	31.9	2.8	6.0	1.6	7.4	3.3	0.5	0.4	1.1	9.1	19.0	6.0	10.6	0.2
Boldesager	25.6	3.6	9.4	0.7	8.0	3.6	0.1	0.4	1.6	7.4	27.1	4.5	7.7	0.3
Østerbyen	33.1	2.9	5.5	1.0	8.6	3.6	0.2	1.9	1.1	8.3	18.8	6.5	8.0	0.6
Skads	22.8	2.9	10.7	1.4	5.2	5.1	0.3	0.5	1.5	9.6	30.4	6.0	3.5	0.0
Gjesing	22.5	4.1	8.0	2.1	7.8	4.1	0.1	0.3	1.4	6.3	34.2	4.9	4.2	0.1
Bryndum	19.6	2.6	7.7	1.4	5.6	5.5	0.1	0.2	0.5	7.5	37.3	9.6	2.1	0.4
Sædding	25.1	3.6	8.8	1.3	7.3	3.9	0.1	0.3	1.0	7.0	31.2	5.7	4.4	0.2
Hjerting	19.3	5.6	9.7	0.8	4.4	4.2	0.0	0.2	0.9	6.2	40.9	5.1	2.6	0.1
Guldager	20.2	3.9	6.5	1.5	5.6	5.9	0.0	0.3	1.1	6.7	37.2	8.2	2.7	0.1
Tjæreborg	23.7	1.7	23.3	0.6	3.7	3.3	0.0	0.0	0.6	5.4	29.4	5.4	2.5	0.2
Kvaglund	30.5	2.7	13.5	1.1	7.1	1.7	0.2	0.4	0.9	8.9	17.8	5.4	9.6	0.3
Ådalen	24.5	1.9	7.8	1.6	5.4	4.5	0.2	0.5	0.9	9.6	32.3	8.0	2.8	0.0
Grønlandsparken	30.6	3.1	7.7	1.5	7.2	3.2	0.2	0.5	1.2	9.8	25.8	5.3	3.9	0.1
Sønderris	22.3	2.8	8.4	0.7	4.9	4.1	0.0	0.0	1.1	8.3	40.8	4.6	2.0	0.1
Bramming	24.2	1.6	7.8	0.8	8.4	3.6	0.1	0.2	0.8	7.8	35.3	6.8	2.5	0.2
Ribe	20.0	1.6	8.8	0.2	10.5	2.8	0.1	0.2	1.4	4.2	40.5	4.2	5.5	0.2
Egebæk-Hviding	15.6	1.3	5.1	0.6	7.6	4.3	0.1	0.1	4.3	6.8	40.8	7.4	5.7	0.3
Gredstedbro	16.5	0.7	5.2	0.9	5.2	4.2	0.0	0.4	0.6	7.6	49.0	7.6	1.8	0.2
Mandø	16.7	3.3	0.0	0.0	3.3	0.0	3.3	0.0	0.0	0.0	66.7	3.3	3.3	0.0
Høm	12.5	1.2	3.9	0.6	5.2	13.5	0.0	0.2	1.4	7.5	44.3	7.1	2.1	0.4
Gørding	13.0	1.4	17.0	1.0	4.4	3.1	0.1	0.1	0.9	11.0	37.2	8.8	1.9	0.2

== Results ==
Party		Votes	%	+/-	Seats	+/-
Esbjerg Municipality
V	Venstre	19,051	32.61	-4.01	11	-2
A	Social Democrats	13,541	23.18	-4.21	7	-2
C	Conservatives	5,386	9.22	+1.12	3	0
O	Danish People's Party	4,248	7.27	+3.62	2	+1
F	Green Left	4,240	7.26	-2.30	2	-1
Æ	Denmark Democrats	3,275	5.61	New	2	New
Ø	Red-Green Alliance	2,920	5.00	+2.46	2	+2
I	Liberal Alliance	2,390	4.09	+3.41	1	+1
B	Social Liberals	1,691	2.89	-0.76	1	0
M	Moderates	692	1.18	New	0	New
E	Borgerlig Fornuft	577	0.99	New	0	New
L	Ildsjælene	206	0.35	New	0	New
Å	The Alternative	125	0.21	New	0	New
J	Esbjerg 2.0	85	0.15	New	0	New
Total		58,427	100	N/A	31	N/A
Invalid votes		223	0.24	-0.01		
Blank votes		1,029	1.12	+0.26		
Turnout		59,679	65.12	+0.94		
Source: valg.dk

== Opinion polls ==
Polling firm	Fieldwork date	Sample size	V	A	F	C	B	O	Ø	I	E	J	L	M	Å	Æ	Others	Lead
Epinion	4 Sep - 13 Oct 2025	562	28.9	23.1	9.8	4.6	3.4	4.4	5.4	5.3	–	–	–	2.2	1.0	10.8	1.1	5.8
2024 european parliament election	9 Jun 2024		19.5	18.2	13.3	8.1	4.3	7.9	3.9	9.1	–	–	–	4.8	1.7	9.3	–	1.3
2022 general election	1 Nov 2022		14.8	31.0	6.6	4.8	2.3	2.8	2.8	8.1	–	–	–	8.8	1.3	10.0	–	16.2
2021 regional election	16 Nov 2021		45.2	25.2	6.2	6.0	3.4	3.4	3.2	0.7	–	–	–	–	0.2	–	–	20.0
2021 municipal election	16 Nov 2021		36.6 (13)	27.4 (9)	9.6 (3)	8.1 (3)	3.7 (1)	3.7 (1)	2.5 (0)	0.7 (0)	–	–	–	–	–	–	–	9.2
