= Honorary Fellowship of the American Institute of Architects =

Honorary Fellowship of the American Institute of Architects (Hon. FAIA) may be awarded to foreign (non-U.S. citizen) architects and for non-architects who have made great contributions to the field of architecture or to the American Institute of Architects. The program was developed as the international counterpart to the AIA Fellowship program for US citizens or architects working primarily out of the US.

== Honorary Fellows by country ==
The list is incomplete. Please help to improve it.

=== Asia ===
- Ngô Viết Thụ, Hon. FAIA 1962, Vietnam
- Leandro V. Locsin, Hon. FAIA 1980, Philippines
- Kim Swoo Geun, Hon. FAIA 1982. South Korea
- Muzharul Islam, Hon. FAIA 1999, Bangladesh
- Seung H-Sang, Hon. FAIA 2002, South Korea
- Min Hyun Sik, Hon. FAIA 2006, South Korea
- Itsuko Hasegawa, Hon. FAIA 2006, Japan
- Ryu Choon-Soo, Hon. FAIA 2008, South Korea
- Kris Yao, Hon. FAIA 2014, Taiwan
- Minsuk Cho, Hon. FAIA 2026, Korea
- Rossana Ju-Shan Hu, Hon. FAIA 2026, China
- Yansong Ma, Hon. FAIA 2026, China
- Takaharu Tezuka, Hon FAIA 2026, Japan

=== Europe ===
European Honorary Fellows:

==== Austria ====
- Carl Auböck, Hon. FAIA 1971
- Carlo Baumschlager, Hon. FAIA 2004
- Dietmar Eberle, Hon. FAIA 2004
- Hans Hollein, Hon. FAIA 1981
- Wilhelm Holzbauer, Hon. FAIA 1986
- Gustav Peichl, Hon. FAIA 1996
- Ernst Plischke, Hon. FAIA 1988
- Wolf D. Prix, Hon. FAIA 2006
- Roland Rainer, Hon. FAIA 1973
- Karl Schwanzer, Hon. FAIA 1967

==== Bulgaria ====
- Kiril Iliev Doytchev, Hon. FAIA 1990
- Nikola Ivanor Nikolov, Hon. FAIA 1973
- Methodi A. Pissarski, Hon. FAIA 1978
- Gueorgui Stoilov, Hon. FAIA 1984
- Luben N. Tonev, Hon. FAIA 1975

==== Czech Republic ====
- Vladimir Karfik, Hon. FAIA 1985
- Vladimir Slapeta, Hon. FAIA 1992
- Ladislav Lábus, Hon. FAIA 2013

==== Denmark ====
- Jacob Blegvad, Hon. FAIA 1990
- Inger Exner, Hon. FAIA 1992
- Johannes Exner, Hon. FAIA 1992
- Tobias Faber, Hon. FAIA 1987
- Kay Fisker, Hon. FAIA 1955
- Knud Friis, Hon. FAIA 1983
- Jan Gehl, Hon. FAIA 2008
- Fleming Grut, Hon. FAIA 1958
- Preben Hansen, Hon. FAIA 1969
- Arne Jacobsen, Hon. FAIA 1962
- Henning Larsen, Hon. FAIA 1986
- Jens Nielsen, Hon. FAIA 1991
- Steen Eiler Rasmussen, Hon. FAIA 1962
- Johan Richter, Hon. FAIA 1989
- Hans Hartvig Skaarup, Hon. FAIA 1976
- Lene Tranberg, Hon. FAIA 2010
- Jørn Utzon, Hon. FAIA 1970
- Dorte Mandrup, Hon. FAIA 2026
- Dan Stubbergaard, Hon. FAIA 2026

==== Costa Rica ====
- Victor Cañas, Hon. FAIA 2009
- Jose Luis Salinas, Hon. FAIA 2006

==== Finland ====
- Alvar Aalto, Hon. FAIA 1958
- Elissa Aalto, Hon. FAIA 1981
- Gunnel Adlercreutz, Hon. FAIA 1997
- Eric Dubosc, Hon. FAIA 2006
- Aarne Ervi, Hon. FAIA 1966
- Mikko Heikkinen, Hon. FAIA 2005
- Markku Komonen, Hon. FAIA 2005
- Erik Emil Krakstrom, Hon. FAIA 1979
- Juha Ilmari Leiviskä, Hon. FAIA 1994
- Matti K. Makinen, Hon. FAIA 1988
- Juhani Pallasmaa, Hon. FAIA 1989
- Raili Pietila, Hon. FAIA 1996
- Reima Pietila, Hon. FAIA 1976
- Aarno E. Ruusuvuori, Hon. FAIA 1982
- Heikki Siren, Hon. FAIA 1986
- Kaija Siren, Hon. FAIA 1986
- Timo Suomalainen, Hon. FAIA 2000

==== France ====
- Louis Gerard Arretche, Hon. FAIA 1989 Deceased
- Jacques Barge, Hon. FAIA 1971 Deceased
- Eugene Beaudouin, Hon. FAIA 1964 Deceased
- Gerard Benoit, Hon. FAIA 1985
- Jean Canaux, Hon. FAIA 1959
- Georges Candilis, Hon. FAIA 1968 Deceased
- Jean-Marie Charpentier, Hon. FAIA 2003
- Henri-Marie Delaage, Hon. FAIA 1972 Deceased
- Solange d'Herbez de la Tour, Hon. FAIA 1986
- Pierre-André Dufetel, Hon. FAIA 1988
- Andre Gutton, Hon. FAIA 1963 Deceased
- Jean Jacques Haffner, Hon. FAIA 1959 Deceased
- Charles Edouard Jeanneret-Gris, Hon. FAIA 1961
- G. Robert Le Ricolais, Hon. FAIA 1973 Deceased
- Wladimir Mitrofanoff, Hon. FAIA 2001
- Benjamin Mouton, Hon. FAIA 2008
- Jean Nouvel, Hon. FAIA 1993
- Dominique Perrault, Hon. FAIA 2007
- Georges-Henri Pingusson, Hon. FAIA 1977 Deceased
- Christian de Portzamparc, Hon. FAIA 1997
- Andre Remondet, Hon. FAIA 1974 Deceased
- Philippe Robert, Hon. FAIA 1993
- Roland Schweitzer, Hon. FAIA 2006
- Marion Tournon-Branly, Hon. FAIA 1979
- Edouard Utudjian, Hon. FAIA 1970
- Pierre Vago, Hon. FAIA 1952 Deceased
- Jean Paul Viguier, Hon. FAIA 2001
- Michel Weill, Hon. FAIA 1974 Deceased
- Bernard Henri Zehrfuss, Hon. FAIA 1966 Deceased
- Aymeric Zublena, Hon. FAIA 2006
- Lina Ghotmeh, Hon. FAIA 2026

==== Germany ====
- Kurt Ackermann, Hon. FAIA 1996
- Stefan Behnisch, Hon. FAIA 2008
- Gottfried Boehm, Hon. FAIA 1983
- Werner Duttman, Hon. FAIA 1969
- Meinhard von Gerkan, Hon. FAIA 1995
- Josef Paul Kleihues, Hon. FAIA 1989 Deceased
- Rob Krier, Hon. FAIA 1996
- Wilhelm Kücker, Hon. FAIA 1999
- Peter H. Oltmanns, Hon. FAIA 1976
- Frei Otto, Hon. FAIA 1968
- Richard Joachim Sahl, Hon. FAIA 1980
- Detlef Schreiber, Hon. FAIA 1998 Deceased
- Helmut C. Schulitz, Hon. FAIA 1997

==== Greece ====
- Constantin N. Decavalla, Hon. FAIA 1984
- Constantin D. Kitsikis, Hon. FAIA 1963
- Vassilis C. Sgoutas, Hon. FAIA 2000
- Alexandros N. Tombazis, Hon. FAIA 1991

==== Hungary ====
- Janos Bohonyey, Hon. FAIA 1975
- Ferenc Callmeyer, Hon. FAIA 1983
- Jozsef Finta, Hon. FAIA 1991
- Imre Makovecz, Hon. FAIA 1987

==== Ireland ====
- Padraig Murray, Hon. FAIA 1982
- Sheila O'Donnell, Hon. FAIA 2010
- Michael Scott, Hon. FAIA 1972
- John Tuomey, Hon. FAIA 2010

==== Italy ====
- Franco Albini, Hon. FAIA 1968
- Emilio Ambasz, Hon. FAIA 2007
- Gaetana Aulenti, Hon. FAIA 1990
- Carlo Aymonino, Hon. FAIA 2000
- Emiliano Bernasconi, Hon. FAIA 1976
- Massimo Carmassi, Hon. FAIA 2005
- Giovanni-Batista Ceas, Hon. FAIA 1952
- Giancarlo De Carlo, Hon. FAIA 1975
- Lodovico Barbiano di Belgiojoso, Hon. FAIA 1988
- Massimiliano Fuksas, Hon. FAIA 2002
- Ignazio Gardella, Hon. FAIA 1999
- Bruno Gabbiani, Hon. FAIA 2009
- Vittorio Gregotti, Hon. FAIA 1999
- Sergio Lenci, Hon. FAIA 2001
- Luigi Moretti, Hon. FAIA 1964
- Adolfo Natalini, Hon. FAIA 2007
- Pier Luigi Nervi, Hon. FAIA 1957
- Manfredi Nicoletti, Hon. FAIA 2009
- Renzo Piano, Hon. FAIA 1982
- Gio Ponti, Hon. FAIA 1963
- Paolo Portoghesi, Hon. FAIA 2002
- Aldo Rossi, Hon. FAIA 1989 Deceased
- Gino Valle, Hon. FAIA 1993
- Bruno Zevi, Hon. FAIA 1968
- Malta Richard England, Hon. FAIA 1999
- Carlo Ratti, Hon FAIA 2026

==== Netherlands ====
- Jacob Berend Bakema, Hon. FAIA 1966
- Jo van den Broek, Hon. FAIA 1962
- Jo Coenen, Hon. FAIA 2009
- Willem Marinus Dudok, Hon. FAIA 1952
- Ernest F. Groosman, Hon. FAIA 1977
- Alex Johan Henri Maria Haak, Hon. FAIA 1971
- Herman Hertzberger, Hon. FAIA 2004
- Francine Houben, Hon. FAIA 2007
- Rem Koolhaas, Hon. FAIA 1999
- Winy Maas, Hon. FAIA 2009
- Aldo van Eyck, Hon. FAIA 1982

==== Norway ====
- Sverre Fehn, Hon. FAIA 1989 Deceased
- Kjell Lund, Hon. FAIA 1996 Deceased
- Nils Slaatto, Hon. FAIA 1996 Deceased
- Kristin Jarmund, Hon. FAIA 2011
- Reiulf Ramstad, Hon. FAIA 2016

==== Poland ====
- Jerzy Buszkiewicz, Hon. FAIA 1981
- Henryk Buszko, Hon. FAIA 1974
- Adolf Ciborowski, Hon. FAIA 1980
- Jerzy Hryniewiecki, Hon. FAIA 1962
- Stanisław Jankowski, Hon. FAIA 1982

==== Portugal ====
- Alfredo Victor Jorge Álvares, Hon. FAIA 1967, Deceased
- Álvaro Siza Vieira, Hon. FAIA 1996
- Eduardo Souto de Moura, Hon. FAIA 2007

==== Spain ====
- Fuensanta Nieto, Hon. FAIA 2015
- de:Enrique Sobejano, Hon. FAIA 2015
- Luis Jesus Arizmendi Amiel, Hon. FAIA 1972
- Juan Navarro Baldeweg, Hon. FAIA 2001
- Carme Pigem Barcelo, Hon. FAIA 2010
- Ricardo Bofill, Hon. FAIA 1985
- Oriol Bohigas, Hon. FAIA 1993
- Juan Gonzalez Cebrian, Hon. FAIA 1975
- Mario Corea, Hon. FAIA 2010
- Rafael de La-Hoz, Hon. FAIA 1980
- Rafael Moneo, Hon. FAIA 1993
- Juan Bassegoda Nonell, Hon. FAIA 1994
- Ramon Vilalta Pujol, Hon. FAIA 2010
- Rafael Aranda Quiles, Hon. FAIA 2010
- Ignasi de Solà-Morales, Hon. FAIA 1995 Deceased

==== Sweden ====
- Hakon Claes Axel Ahlberg, Hon. FAIA 1952
- Nils Carlson, Hon. FAIA 1992
- Ralph Erskine, Hon. FAIA 1966
- Carl Nyrén, Hon. FAIA 1993
- Ervin P. Pütsep, Hon. FAIA 1983
- Sten Olov Samuelson, Hon. FAIA 1984
- Anders Tengbom, Hon. FAIA 1978
- Lennart Uhlin, Hon. FAIA 1977
- Carl Martin William-Olson, Hon. FAIA 1952

==== Switzerland ====
- Max Bill, Hon. FAIA 1964
- Mario Botta, Hon. FAIA 1983
- Pierre H. Bussat, Hon. FAIA 1984
- Justus Dahinden, Hon. FAIA 1973
- William Dunkel, Hon. FAIA 1969
- Charles Edouard Geisendorf, Hon. FAIA 1968
- Jacques Herzog, Hon. FAIA 2003
- Pierre de Meuron, Hon. FAIA 2003
- Alfred Roth, Hon. FAIA 1966
- Alberto Sartoris, Hon. FAIA 1985
- Peter Zumthor, Hon. FAIA 2004

==== Turkey ====
- Dogan Kuban, Hon. FAIA 1994
- Gulsun Saglamer, Hon. FAIA 2006
- Suha Ozkan, Hon. FAIA 2004

==== USSR ====
- Pavel Vasilievitch Abrosimov, Hon. FAIA 1958
- Nicolai Barfolomeitch Baranov, Hon. FAIA 1973
- Vakhtang Davitaia, Hon. FAIA 1992
- Alexander P. Kudryavtsev, Hon. FAIA 1992
- Gueorgui Mikhaylovich Orlov, Hon. FAIA 1972
- Yuri P. Platanov, Hon. FAIA 1990
- Michail Vassilievich Posokhin, Hon. FAIA 1978

==== United Kingdom ====
- Monica Pidgeon, Hon. FAIA 1987
- John McAslan Hon. FAIA 2016
- Alex Ely Hon. FAIA 2026

=== Oceania ===
- Richard Francis-Jones, Hon. FAIA 2012

=== South America ===
- Gonzalo Mardones Viviani, Hon. FAIA 2016
- Fernando Romero
- Giancarlo Mazzanti, Hon. FAIA 2017
- Fernanda Canales, Hon. FAIA 2026, Mexico
- Frida Escobedo, Hon. FAIA 2026, Mexico

== See also ==
- Fellow of the American Institute of Architects
