= 2021 Esbjerg municipal election =

← 2017	16 November 2021	2025 →

All 31 seats to the Esbjerg Municipal Council 16 seats needed for a majority
- Turnout: 59,147 (64.6%) ▼4.9pp
	First party	Second party	Third party
	V	A	F
Party	Venstre	Social Democrats	Green Left
Last election	11 seats, 32.2%	11 seats, 30.5%	2 seats, 6.0%
Seats won	13	9	3
Seat change	▲2	▼2	▲1
Popular vote	21,285	15,920	5,553
Percentage	36.6%	27.4%	9.6%
Swing	▲4.4%	▼3.1%	▲3.6%
	Fourth party	Fifth party	Sixth party
	C	D	B
Party	Conservatives	New Right	Social Liberals
Last election	1 seat, 4.2%	0 seats, 1.0%	1 seat, 3.0%
Seats won	3	1	1
Seat change	▲2	▲1	0
Popular vote	4,707	2,549	2,124
Percentage	8.1%	4.4%	3.6%
Swing	▲3.9%	▲3.4%	▲0.6%
	Seventh party	Eighth party	Ninth party
	O	Ø	E
Party	Danish People's Party	Red–Green Alliance	Borgerlisten
Last election	3 seats, 8.6%	1 seat, 4.1%	1 seat, 4,9%
Seats won	1	0	0
Seat change	▼2	▼1	▼1
Popular vote	2,122	1,476	1,104
Percentage	3.6%	2.5%	1.9%
Swing	▼5%	▼1.6%	▼3.0%
Mayor before election
Jesper Frost Rasmussen
Venstre
Mayor after election
Jesper Frost Rasmussen
Venstre

Unlike the 4 other largest municipalities of Denmark, Esbjerg, the 5th largest, is less of a stronghold for parties of the traditional red bloc, and is more of a slightly blue (Note: for parties of the blue bloc) municipality.

However, the Social Democrats targeted the municipality for a potential flip of the mayor position, after Venstre had held it since 1994. Political analyst Hans Redder argued that the Social Democrats saw it as a traditional labour municipality. Added to that, the blue bloc won 16 seats against 15 in the last election.

This attempt by the Social Democrats failed in a fairly large scale . They lost 2 seats, while Venstre gained 2, and the blue bloc went from 16 to 18 seats. It later confirmed that Jesper Frost Rasmussen from Venstre would continue for a second term.

== Electoral system ==
For elections to Danish municipalities, a number varying from 9 to 31 are chosen to be elected to the municipal council. The seats are then allocated using the D'Hondt method and a closed list proportional representation. Esbjerg Municipality had 31 seats in 2021.

Unlike in Danish General Elections, in elections to municipal councils, electoral alliances are allowed.

== Electoral alliances ==
=== Electoral Alliance 1 ===
Party		Political alignment
A	Social Democrats	Centre-left
F	Green Left	Centre-left to Left-wing
Ø	Red–Green Alliance	Left-wing to Far-Left

=== Electoral Alliance 2 ===
Party		Political alignment
C	Conservatives	Centre-right
D	New Right	Right-wing to Far-right
E	Borgerlisten	Local politics
I	Liberal Alliance	Centre-right to Right-wing
K	Christian Democrats	Centre to Centre-right
O	Danish People's Party	Right-wing to Far-right
T	Esbjerglisten	Local politics
V	Venstre	Centre-right

== Results by polling station ==
T = Esbjerglisten
U = Partifrit Samfund

Division	A	B	C	D	E	F	I	K	O	T	U	V	Æ	Ø
Division	%	%	%	%	%	%	%	%	%	%	%	%	%	%
Esbjerg Rådhus	24.3	4.9	12.1	4.1	2.8	10.5	1.7	0.3	3.1	0.5	0.0	30.9	0.3	4.3
Skovbo	35.7	3.2	7.7	3.2	2.8	10.2	1.5	0.2	4.1	1.1	0.1	26.2	0.3	3.7
Rørkjær	34.6	4.4	7.8	3.7	2.1	13.7	0.5	0.1	4.7	1.0	0.0	23.4	0.6	3.6
Jerne	39.4	4.9	5.7	4.2	2.0	11.5	0.6	0.7	5.5	0.9	0.0	20.4	0.5	3.7
Boldesager	28.7	4.3	8.5	4.0	2.5	12.6	0.7	0.5	3.6	0.7	0.1	30.0	0.4	3.5
Østerbyen	43.3	3.6	5.4	3.8	1.3	11.3	0.4	0.3	5.1	1.1	0.0	19.9	0.5	3.9
Skads	21.0	4.0	7.1	4.6	1.7	8.3	0.7	0.7	4.3	0.8	0.0	45.7	0.6	0.7
Gjesing	24.9	4.1	7.8	4.6	2.2	9.7	0.7	0.5	2.8	0.9	0.0	39.3	0.2	2.3
Guldager	23.5	4.4	9.3	4.9	2.0	8.5	1.0	1.4	2.6	1.0	0.0	39.7	0.2	1.4
Hjerting	21.2	5.9	11.7	3.5	2.2	6.7	0.6	0.2	2.5	1.0	0.0	43.1	0.2	1.2
Sædding	25.8	3.6	8.5	4.2	2.7	10.5	0.5	0.8	4.3	1.0	0.0	35.9	0.2	2.0
Bryndum	22.1	3.4	7.9	4.9	2.1	8.0	0.4	0.4	4.7	0.7	0.0	43.9	0.2	1.2
Tjæreborg	28.6	3.0	6.1	4.1	1.1	8.1	0.2	0.3	3.0	0.6	0.1	42.9	0.3	1.6
Kvaglund	37.4	4.3	6.4	3.9	2.1	10.7	0.3	1.3	4.2	2.6	0.2	22.4	0.3	4.0
Ådalen	28.0	2.6	7.2	5.7	2.0	8.0	0.6	0.7	5.7	0.9	0.0	36.9	0.3	1.5
Grønlandsparken	35.0	2.3	5.8	6.4	1.9	10.9	0.6	0.4	4.7	1.0	0.0	28.8	0.2	2.1
Egebæk-Hviding	24.5	3.1	8.9	4.8	0.9	8.4	0.7	0.8	2.9	0.2	0.0	42.5	0.1	2.2
Ribe	29.0	2.8	8.6	2.7	0.7	9.5	0.5	0.3	2.0	0.1	0.0	40.4	0.1	3.5
Bramming	23.3	2.1	5.7	6.1	0.8	9.4	0.4	0.7	4.4	0.2	0.1	45.5	0.1	1.3
Sønderris	22.2	4.0	8.1	3.3	4.3	8.7	0.9	1.0	2.6	0.9	0.1	42.4	0.1	1.5
Gredstedbro	22.1	2.0	8.2	6.2	0.4	5.3	0.2	1.4	3.1	0.0	0.0	50.1	0.1	0.9
Mandø	27.3	9.1	4.5	4.5	0.0	4.5	0.0	0.0	4.5	0.0	0.0	45.5	0.0	0.0
Høm	17.1	2.4	5.5	5.4	3.4	5.0	1.1	1.5	3.1	0.3	0.0	53.5	0.1	1.6
Gørding	18.0	1.7	5.5	7.3	1.2	5.9	0.7	0.5	4.1	0.3	0.0	53.4	0.1	1.3

== Results ==
Party		Votes	%	+/-	Seats	+/-
Esbjerg Municipality
V	Venstre	21,285	36.62	+4.42	13	+2
A	Social Democrats	15,920	27.39	-3.15	9	-2
F	Green Left	5,553	9.55	+3.55	3	+1
C	Conservatives	4,707	8.10	+3.94	3	+2
D	New Right	2,549	4.39	+3.42	1	+1
B	Social Liberals	2,124	3.65	+0.65	1	0
O	Danish People's Party	2,122	3.65	-5.00	1	-2
Ø	Red-Green Alliance	1,476	2.54	-1.53	0	-1
E	Borgerlisten	1,104	1.90	-3.03	0	-1
T	Esbjerglisten	404	0.70	New	0	New
I	Liberal Alliance	398	0.68	-1.27	0	0
K	Christian Democrats	315	0.54	New	0	New
Æ	Freedom List	150	0.26	New	0	New
U	Partifrit samfund	22	0.04	New	0	New
Total		58,129	100	N/A	31	N/A
Invalid votes		235	0.25	-0.01		
Blank votes		783	0.85	-0.18		
Turnout		59,147	64.18	-4.95		
Source: valg.dk
