= Men at Sea =

Monumental sculpture in Denmark

Coordinates: 55°29′16″N 8°24′40″E

Man at Sea

Men at Sea or Man meets the sea (Danish: Mennesket ved Havet) is a 9-metre (30 feet) tall white monument of four seated males, located west of Esbjerg next to Sædding Beach on the southwest coast of Denmark. Located opposite the Fisheries and Maritime Museum, it is one of the area's major tourist attractions, and is a landmark of Esbjerg.

The sculpture was designed by Svend Wiig Hansen and installed on 28 October 1995. It was funded by the Municipality of Esbjerg, Statens Kunstfond (an art fund), and multiple private sponsors, to celebrate the 100th anniversary of the municipality in 1994.

The artist's original idea for the location of the sculpture was Grenen, north of Skagen.

The monument can be seen from ships leaving or entering Esbjerg harbour.

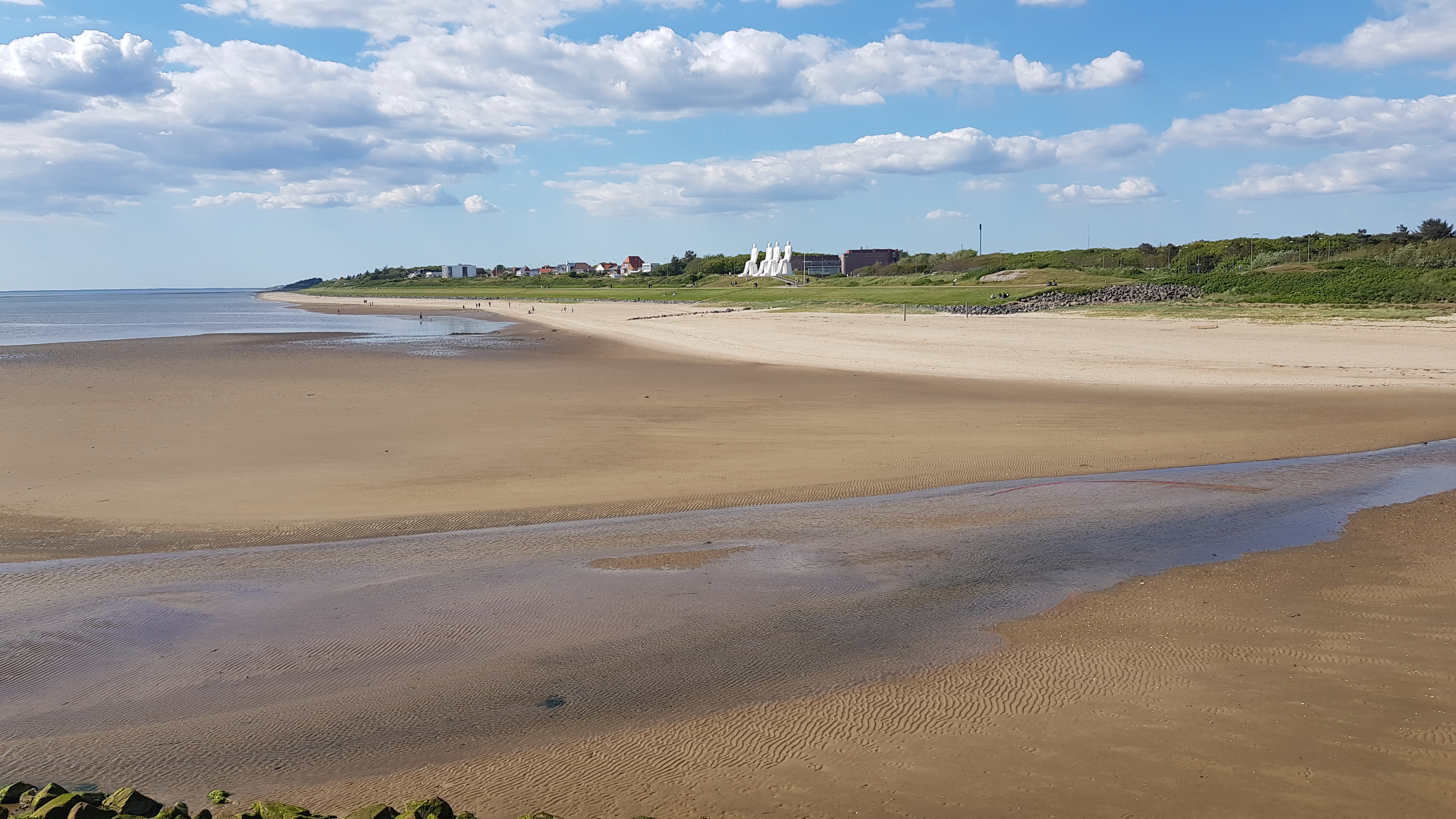
The beach at which the sculpture is situated
