= Adolfo Natalini =

Italian architect (1941–2020)

- Born: 10 May 1941; Pistoia, Italy
- Died: 23 January 2020 (aged 78); Florence, Italy
- Occupation: Architect

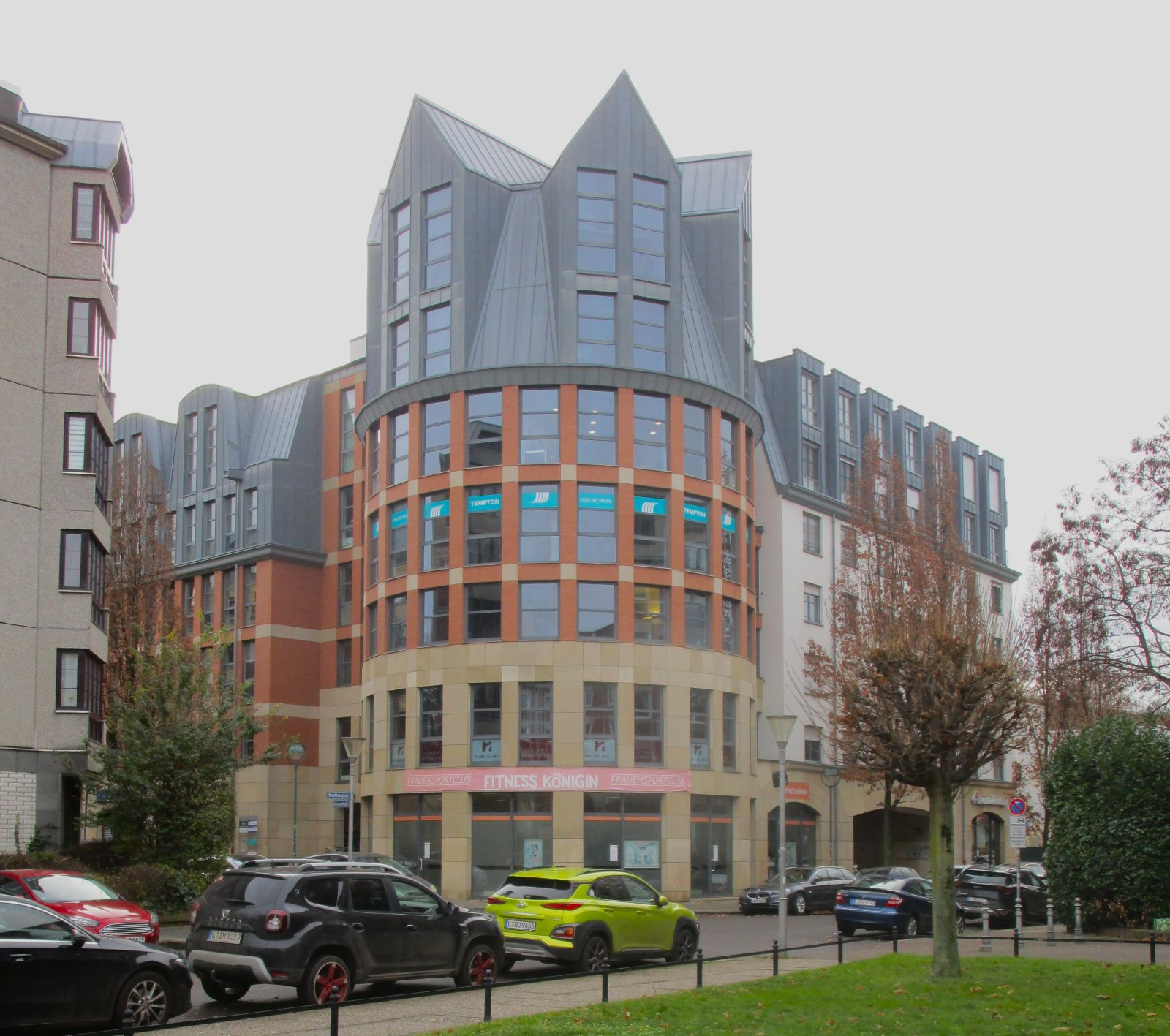
Dorotheenhof Leipzig

Adolfo Natalini (10 May 1941 – 23 January 2020) was an Italian architect.

== Biography ==
Natalini founded the architectural company Superstudio in 1966 along with Cristiano Toraldo di Francia, Gian Piero Frassinelli, Alessandro and Roberto Magris, and Alessandro Poli.

At the end of the 1970s, Natalini became a member of the Architectural School of Pistoia with Roberto Barni, Umberto Buscioni, and Gianni Ruffi. He was one of the pioneers of the radical architettura movement of the 1960s and 70s. During this period, Natalini focused on projects in Italy and other parts of Europe.

Natalini served as a professor of architecture at the University of Florence. He was an honorary member of the Association of German Architects, the Honorary Fellowship of the American Institute of Architects, the Accademia delle Arti del Disegno, the Accademia di Belle Arti di Carrara, and the Accademia di San Luca.

Some of his projects include the Römerberg in Frankfurt, the Western Wall in Jerusalem, the Bank of Alzate Brianza, the Zola Predosa Power Center, the Saalgasse House in Frankfurt and the Dorotheenhof in the neighbourhood Innere Westvorstadt of Leipzig.

Natalini's works in Florence include the Teatro della Compagnia and the Museo dell'Opera del Duomo.

Adolfo Natalini died on 23 January 2020 at the age of 78.
