= Jean-Marie Pérouse de Montclos =

French historian and archaeologist

Jean-Marie Pérouse de Montclos (French pronunciation: [ʒɑ̃ maʁi peʁuz də mɔ̃klo]; born 19 November 1936) is a French architectural historian.

== Family ==
His family was an old bourgeois one originating in the Dauphiné. His earliest known ancestor is Jean Pérouse (died 1663), procurer, mayor of Vienne. Pierre Pérouse de Montclos (1746–1790), was mayor of and deputy for Roussillon, Didier Pérouse de Montclos (1786–1863) was a notary and Henri Pérouse de Montclos (1820–1892) was also mayor of Roussillon.

== Life ==
Born in Amiens, he gained a diploma from the Institut d'études politiques de Paris. He also has a doctorate in literature. He is director of research at the CNRS. When André Malraux and André Chastel established France's Inventaire général du patrimoine culturel in 1964, de Montclos was the first researcher it recruited. He thus took responsibility for its research and documentation, coordinating their method and vocabulary and presiding over the national commission.

He teaches at the École de Chaillot and the École du Louvre and has written several works on early modern architecture. He is a member of France's Académie d'architecture and of the 'conseil scientifique' Centro Internazionale di Studi di Architettura Andrea Palladio (CISA, aka Palladio Museum). His son Marc-Antoine specialises in the politics of conflicts in sub-Saharan Africa and teaches at the Sciences Po Paris.

== Works ==
- 1972 : Architecture. Méthode et vocabulaire, éd. du patrimoine, Paris, 7e éd. 2009 (1st edition, 1972), 622 p. ISBN 2-85822-593-1 ISSN 0768-0031. Nouvelle édition 2011, revue et augmentée ISBN 9782 75770 124-9
- 1982 : L’Architecture à la française, du milieu du XVe à la fin du XVIIIe, éd. Picard, Paris, (republished 2013) ISBN 978-2-7084-0960-6
- 1984 : Les Prix de Rome, Berger-Levrault, École nationale supérieure des beaux-arts, Paris
- 1989 : Histoire de l’architecture française, tome II. De la Renaissance à la Révolution, Mengès, Paris; réimpr. 1995, 2003 ISBN 2-8562-0374-4
- 1992 : Guide du patrimoine. Île-de-France, Hachette, Paris ISBN 2-01-016811-9
- 1993 : Boullée, architecte visionnaire, Hermann ISBN 2-7056-6215-4
- 1994 : Étienne-Louis Boullée, Paris, Flammarion, 1994, 287 p. (ISBN 2-08-010075-0 et 978-2-08-010075-7, OCLC 32078940, notice BnF no FRBNF35729762, LCCN 95130430)
- 1996 : Guide du patrimoine. Languedoc-Roussillon, Hachette, Paris ISBN 2-01-242333-7
- 1997 : Vaux-le-Vicomte, Paris, Scala (republished in 2008)
- 1998 : Le Château de Fontainebleau, Paris, Scala; revised 2009
- 2000 : Philibert de l'Orme. Architecte du roi (1514–1570), Mengès, Paris.
- 2001 : " Serlio à Fontainebleau " in Annali di architettura no. 13, Vicence
- 2004 : L’Art de France. De la Renaissance au Siècle des Lumières 1450–1770, Mengès, Paris
- 2004 : Jacques-Germain Soufflot, Monum, Paris
- 2012 : L'École de Chaillot, une aventure des savoirs et des pratiques (architecture et patrimoine), with Florence Contenay and Benjamin Mouton, Paris, Éditions des Cendres / Cité de l'architecture et du patrimoine
- 2012 : Ange-Jacques Gabriel, Éditions du Patrimoine, Paris ISBN 978-2757702178

== Honours ==
- 2005 : Prix Eugène Carrière pour L’Art de France. De la Renaissance au Siècle des Lumières 1450–1770
- 14 November 1995 – Commander of the ordre des Arts et des Lettres.
