= Sædding =

District of Esbjerg, Jutland, Denmark

Coordinates: 55°30′N 8°24′E

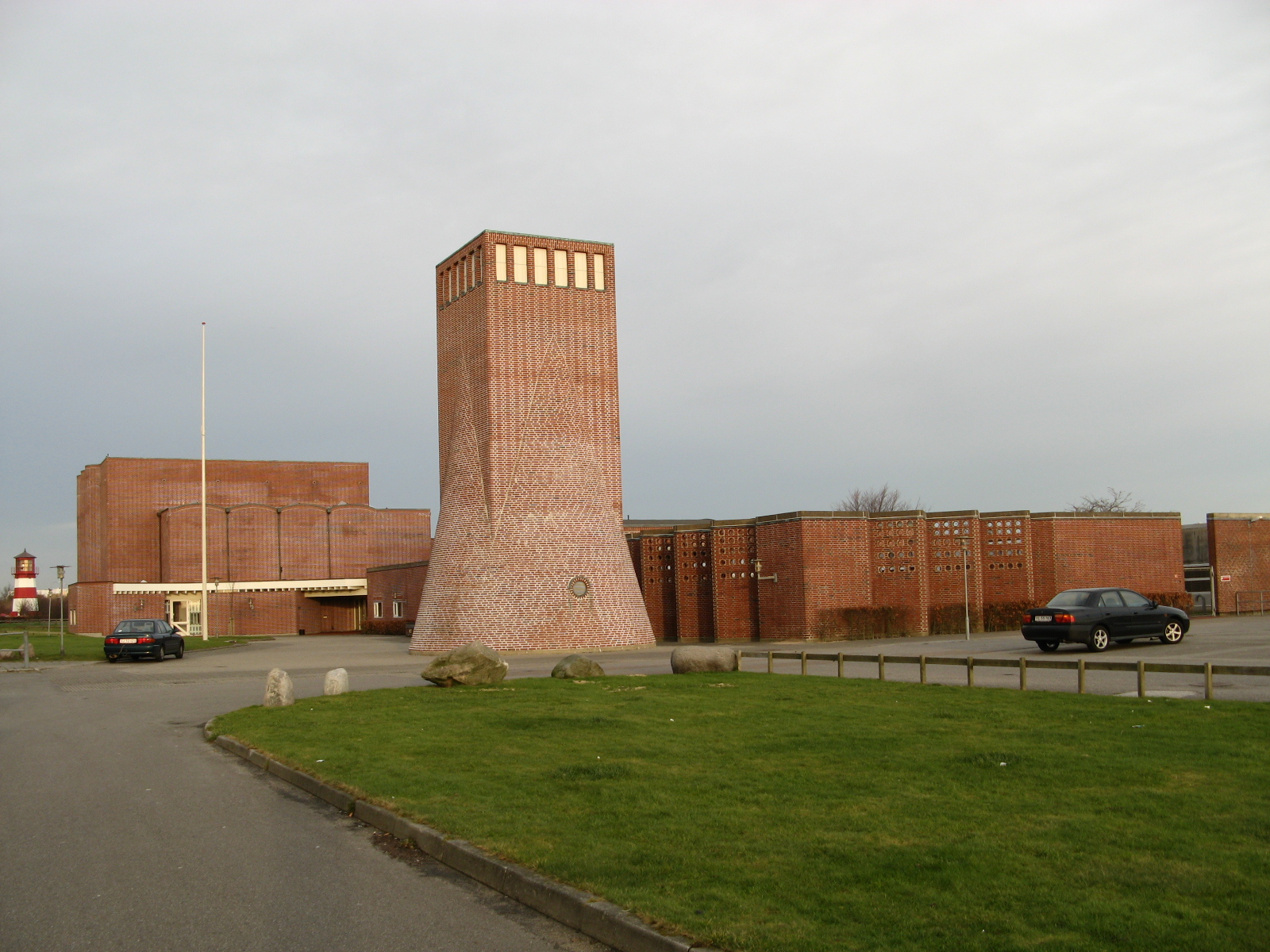
Sædden Church, Esbjerg

Sædding is a district of Esbjerg in southwest Jutland, Denmark, some 5 km (3.1 mi) northwest of the centre and 5 km (3.1 mi) southeast of Hjerting.

== History ==
Once a village, Sædding (originally Sæthum, later also Sæddæn) has now become a district of Esbjerg. In the 1970s, a large Viking village was discovered in the northern part of Sædding covering 3.5 ha (8.6 acres). In the central area, there were six or seven farmhouses surrounding an extensive open area measuring 150 m (490 ft) by 30 m (98 ft). The main buildings, up to 55 m (180 ft) in length, were accompanied by smaller structures including workshops for weavers and smiths. In all, there were 115 farmhouses, 75 workshops and seven wells. The village had existed for some 200 years until the 11th century. One of Denmark's oldest Christian crosses crafted in bronze was found at the site.

In 1688, when the first data were collected under Christian V, there were ten farms and four houses in the village. In 1801, there were 113 inhabitants, in 1890, 171. Sædding Lighthouse came in 1872 with the development of Esbjerg Harbour.

Until the beginning of the 1950s, Sædding remained a small village with a few hundred inhabitants. Work on Sædden Church began in 1977 and was completed in July 1978. In August 1978, Sædding was separated from Guldager as a parish in its own right with some 12,000 inhabitants.

== Sædding today ==
Sædding has a shopping centre (Sædding Centret) established in 1977 which includes a library. The sandy beach (Sædding Strand) beside the Men at Sea monument and the Fisheries and Maritime Museum, Esbjerg is suitable for bathing.
