= Guldager Stationsby =

- Railway town
- Location in the Region of Southern Denmark Guldager Stationsby (Denmark)
- Coordinates: 55°31′59″N 8°26′29″E
- Country: Denmark
- Region: Southern Denmark (Syddanmark)
- Municipality: Esbjerg Municipality

Population (2026)
  - Total: 513

Guldager Stationsby, until 2021 Ravnsbjerg, is a small railway town and northern suburb of Esbjerg, with a population of 513 (1 January 2026). It is located in Esbjerg Municipality 2 km east of Guldager and 9 km north of central Esbjerg in Region of Southern Denmark in Denmark.

The town is served by Guldager railway station on the Esbjerg–Struer railway line.
