= Tobias Faber =

Danish architect

Tobias Faber, Hon. FAIA (12 December 1915 – 19 November 2010) was a Danish architect best known for his academic achievements, He was a professor at the Royal Danish Academy's School of Architecture and the academy's president from 1954 to 1973. He was a strong advocate of keeping a human scale in architecture.

== Biography ==
Faber studied architecture at the Royal Danish Academy of Fine Arts in the 1930s, graduating in 1941. Due to the German Occupation of Denmark during World War II he went to neutral Sweden where he worked at various well-reputed practices in Stockholm. Back in Denmark after the war, he joined Vilhelm Lauritzen's office where he worked until 1952. He then set up his own practice, together with his wife Jytte Jensenius, which operated until 1967.

From 1952 he taught at the Royal Academy of Fine Arts and in 1954 he was a visiting lecturer at Massachusetts Institute of Technology in Boston, USA. In 1962 he was appointed professor at the academy and from 1965 he served as its director, a position he held until 1974 when the Academy Schools were split into separate institutions for administrative reasons. Thereafter he was as the principal of the School of Architecture until his retirement in 1985. He also published a number of influential books on architecture.

== Distinctions ==
Faber was elected to Honorary Fellowship of the American Institute of Architects in 1987 (Hon. FAIA). He received the Dreyer Honorary Award in 1995. He received the N. L. Høyen Medal in 1988.

== Written works ==
- Rum, form og funktion (1962)
- Dansk arkitektur (1963, 1977),
- Arne Jacobsen (1964)

== See also ==
- Architecture of Denmark
