= Inger and Johannes Exner =

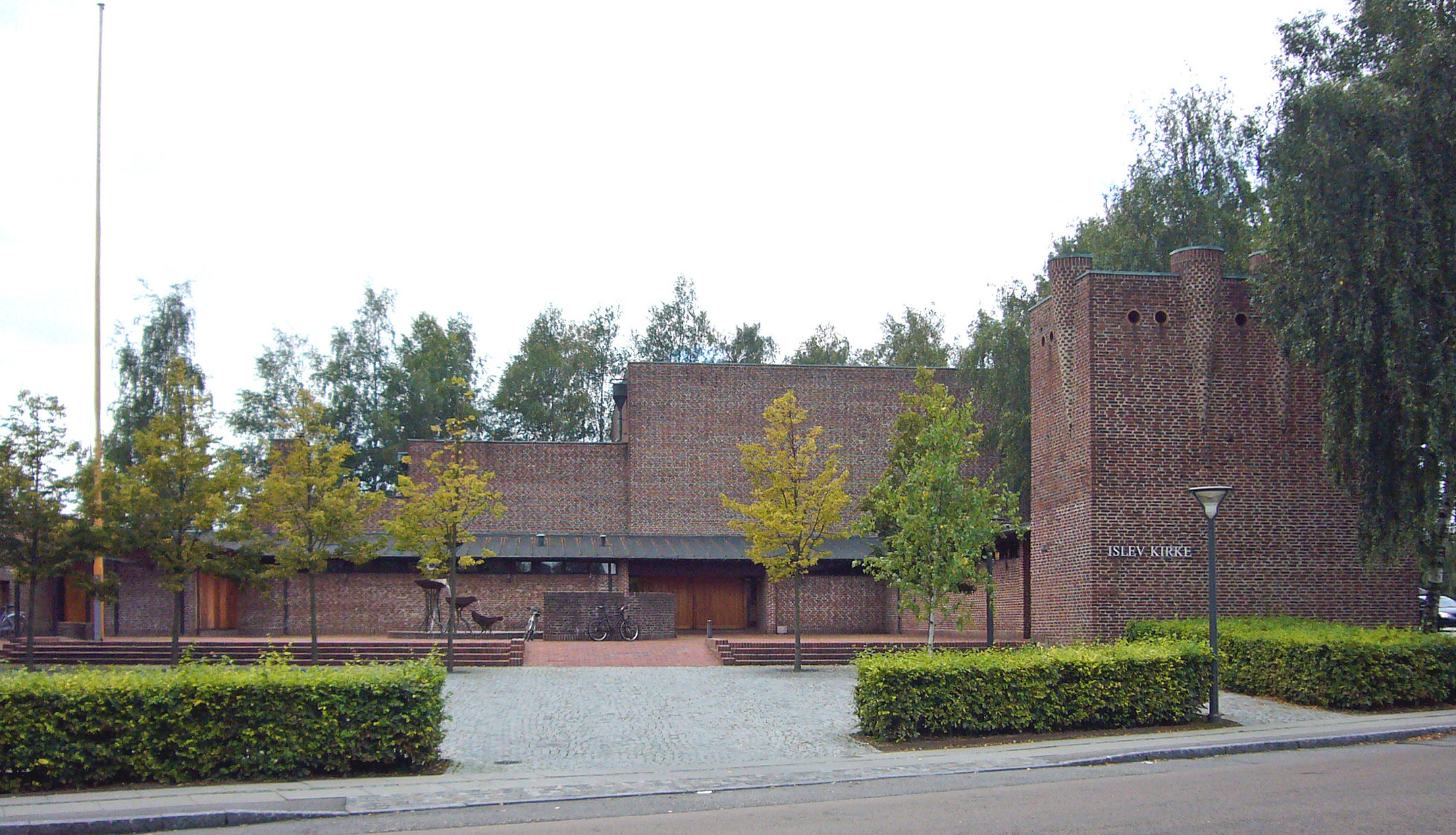
Inger and Johannes Exner: Islev Church (1969)

Inger Augusta Exner, Hon. FAIA (born 20 August 1926, Randers) and Johannes Exner, Hon. FAIA (born 25 March 1926, Hald near Randers; died 16 May 2015) were a Danish couple who cooperated closely as architects. They met at high school and studied architecture together at the Danish Academy where they graduated in 1954. They married in 1952.

In 1958, they opened their own firm, specializing in the construction of churches and in restoration work. Completed projects include Præstebro Church, in Herlev (1966–69), Nørrelandskirke, Holstebro (1967–69), Islev Church, Rødovre (1968–69), Gug Church, Aalborg (1973) and Sædden Church, Esbjerg (1978). Their restoration work included Copenhagen's Rundetårn and Trinity Church (1981–83) as well as the castle of Koldinghus (1972–92) earning them the Europa Nostra award in 1994. In 2001 they completed a new West wing for the Ter Apel Monastery in the Netherlands.

They were awarded the Eckersberg Medal in 1983, the Nykredit Architecture Prize in 1991 and the C. F. Hansen Medal in 1992. In 1992 they were also both given Honorary Memberships of the American Institute of Architects (Hon. FAIA).
