= Sædden Church =

Coordinates: 55°29′52″N 8°24′16″E

- Sædden Kirke
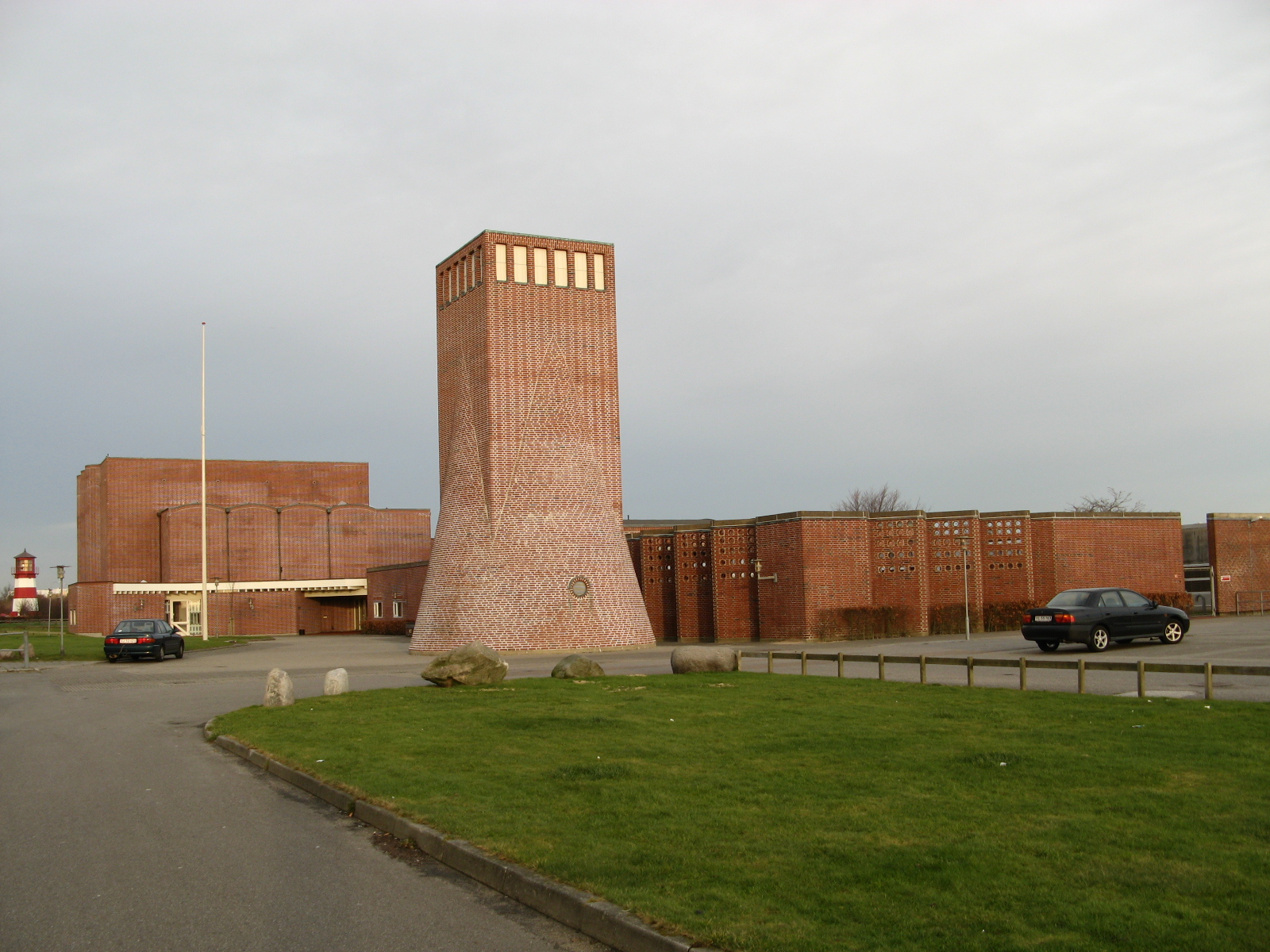
- Sædden Church
- Location: Sædding, Denmark
- Denomination: Church of Denmark
- Website: www.saeddenkirke.dk

Architecture
- Architect: Inger and Johannes Exner
- Completed: 1978

Administration
- Diocese: Diocese of Ribe
- Parish: Sædden Sogn

Sædden Church (Danish: Sædden Kirke) is a church of the Church of Denmark in Esbjerg in the southwest of Jutland, Denmark. Designed by Inger and Johannes Exner, the almost cube-shaped building with a tall, free-standing bell tower was completed and consecrated in 1978.

== Architecture ==
Located in the Sædding neighbourhood northwest of Esbjerg's centre, the church is built entirely of red brick, with wave-shaped folds on the north and east walls. There are galleries on the other two walls. The complex also consists of parish rooms and administrative offices. The free-standing tower is strangely shaped with a round base and a square top.

== Interior ==
The square-shaped interior is contained within plain brick walls. Daylight enters from the top of the tall, folds in the walls and from the ceiling, supplemented by 803 electric bulbs which hang from high above. The effect is such that the altar is the most highly illuminated feature in the church.

The pews are positioned around the altar and the square-shaped marble font. The centrally-placed altar table, also made of white marble 28 cm (11 in) thick, stands on two short columns, each individually shaped as in Solomon's Temple. A cross designed by Bent Exner hangs above it, its 12 small globes symbolizing the apostles and its central gilded mirror, Jesus. The pulpit in pierced brickwork on the north wall stands below a shell-shaped canopy. For acoustical reasons, it is positioned inside one of the recesses formed by the folds in the wall. The church has seating for 350 of which 100 are on the gallery. The French-inspired Baroque organ on the south-wall gallery was designed by the Exners and built by P. Bruhn & Søn of Aarslev. It has 33 stops and 2,250 pipes.

== Gallery ==
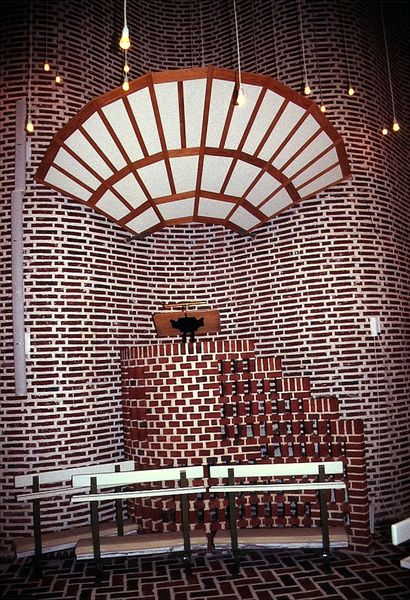
Pulpit

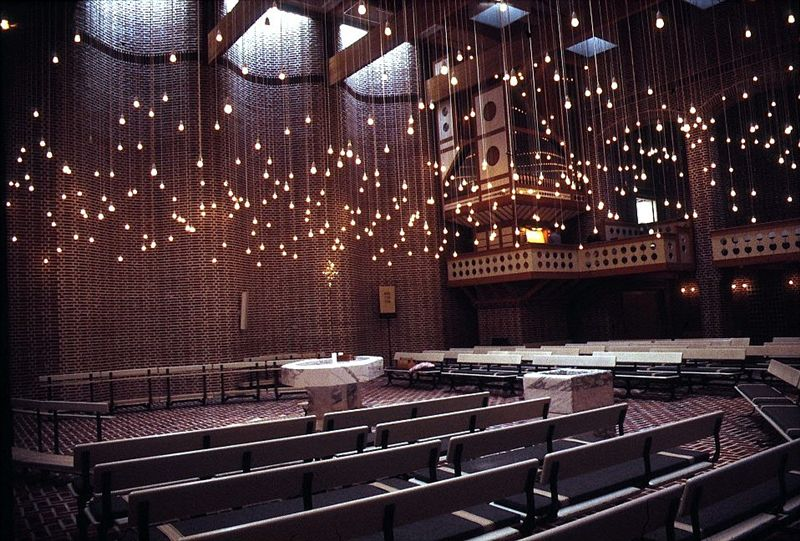
Starlights and Organ

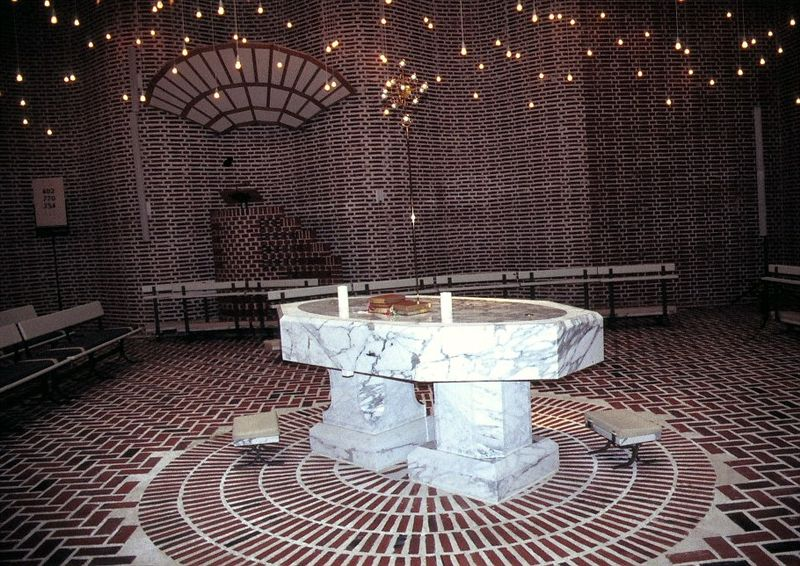
Altar

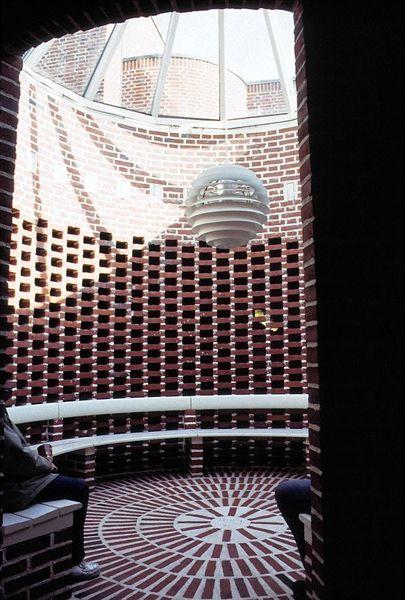
Porch/waiting room

== Literature ==
- Pedersen, Benneth Østergaard; Exner, Inger; Exner, Johannes (1981). Sædden Kirke. Arkitektens Forlag.
