= Svend Wiig Hansen =

Danish sculptor and painter (1922–1997)

Svend Wiig Hansen (20 December 1922 – 15 March 1997) was a Danish sculptor and painter.

== Biography ==
Wiig Hansen was born in Møgeltønder. He was initially undecided about his career, working as a circus clown and a singer until a job requiring his help in the completion of climbing angels convinced him he should become a sculptor. After studying at the Danish Academy under Johannes Bjerg and Einar Utzon-Frank (1946–1950), his early sculptures included his monumental burnt clay Torso (1951) inspired by Aristide Maillol and his cement Moder Jord (Mother Earth, 1953) influenced in part by precolumbian sculpture. The gigantic group sculpture of Mennesket ved havet (Men at Sea, (1994) near Esbjerg is inspired by Cycladic art and the figures on Easter Island. Slægt løfter slægt (1997), which was installed for a period on Gammel Strand in Copenhagen, depicts a naked couple bearing a naked woman.

His recognition as a painter began in 1955 with De søgende. His expression is characterized by stark colouring in his depiction of the human body, often set in a desolate landscape. Among his most important works are Menneskeridt (1959), the series Mennesker i forvandling (People in Transformation, 1963) and Jorden græder (The Earth Weeps, 1981). His work as a decorator can be seen in Kastrup Church (1978), the central hospital in Herning and in Copenhagen's Royal Theatre with his aluminium Himmelrejsen (Heavenly Journey, 1989). He died in Helsingør, aged 74.

== Awards ==
Wiig Hansen received the Swedish Prince Eugen Medal in 1976 and was awarded both the Eckersberg Medal and the Thorvaldsen Medal but chose not to receive them.

== Bibliography ==
- Wiig Hansen, Svend: Wiig Hansen: skulptur, maleri, tegninger, 1985, Copenhagen, Ny Carlsberg glyptotek. ISBN 8774520946. (in Danish)
