= Seoul World Cup Stadium =

Football stadium in Seoul, South Korea

Coordinates: 37°34′05.6″N 126°53′50.5″E

- Sangam Stadium
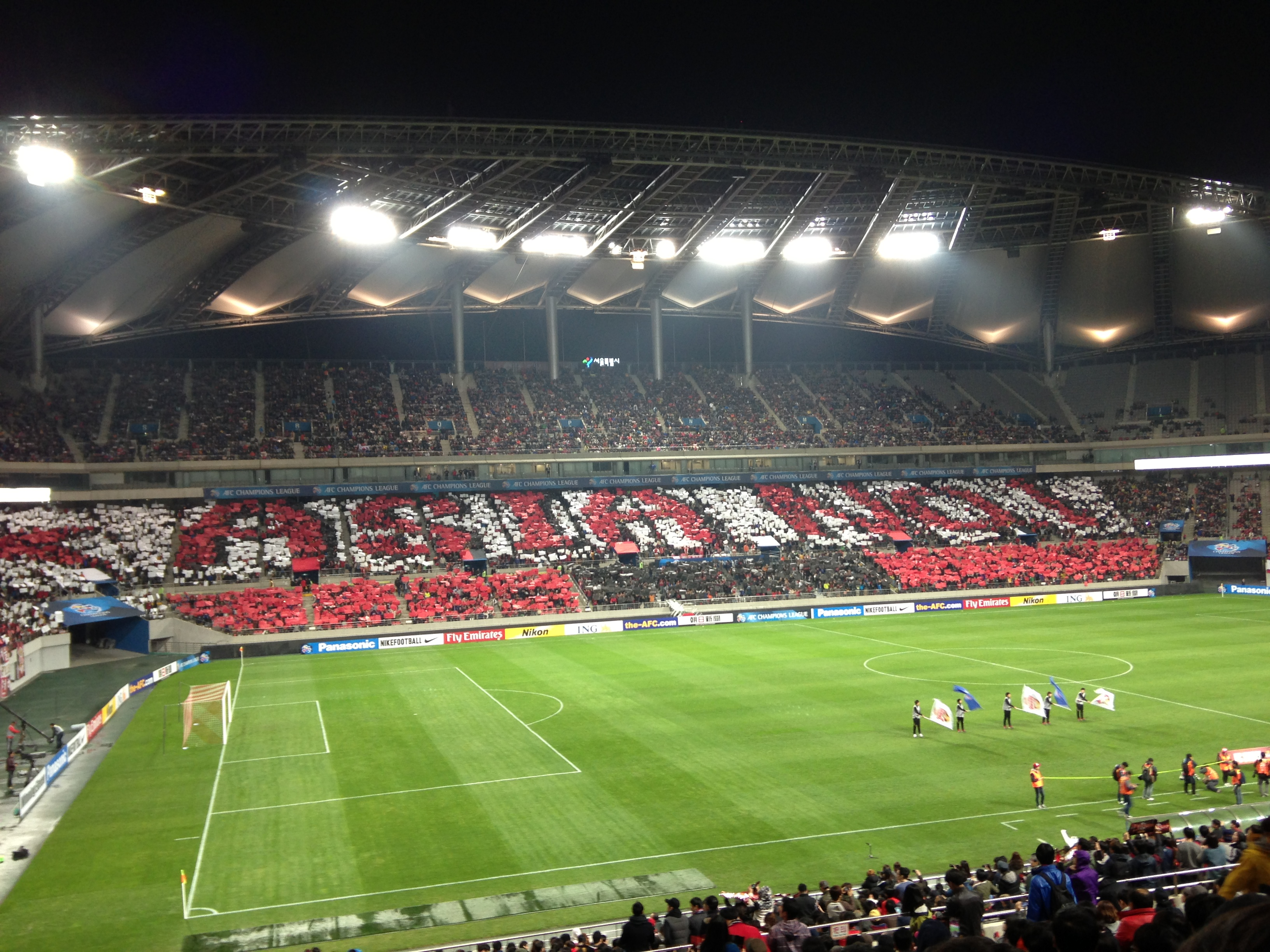
- Interactive map of Seoul World Cup Stadium
- Location: 240 World Cup-ro, Mapo-gu, Seoul, South Korea
- Owner: Seoul Metropolitan Government
- Operator: Seoul Facilities Management Corporation
- Capacity: 66,704
- Surface: Kentucky Bluegrass
- Public transit: Seoul Metropolitan Subway: at World Cup Stadium

Construction
- Groundbreaking: October 20, 1998; 28 years ago
- Opened: November 10, 2001; 24 years ago
- Cost: US $185 million
- Architect: Ryu Choon-soo
- Structural engineer: Geiger Engineers

Tenants
- South Korea national football team FC Seoul (2004–present)

- Seoul World Cup Stadium
- Hangul: 서울월드컵경기장
- Hanja: 서울월드컵競技場
- RR: Seoul Woldeukeop gyeonggijang
- MR: Sŏul Wŏldŭk'ŏp kyŏnggijang

The Seoul World Cup Stadium (Korean: 서울월드컵경기장), a.k.a. the Sangam Stadium, is a stadium used mostly for association football matches, located in 240 World Cup-ro, Mapo-gu, Seoul, South Korea. It was built for the 2002 FIFA World Cup and opened on November 10, 2001.

It is currently the second largest stadium in South Korea after Seoul Olympic Stadium, and is the second largest rectangular stadium in Asia, with a capacity of 66,704 seats. It includes 816 seats for VIP, 754 seats for press, and 75 private Sky Box rooms, each with a capacity for 12 to 29 persons. Due to table seats installation, capacity was reduced from 66,806 seats to 66,704 seats in February 2014.

The stadium was designed to represent the image of a traditional Korean kite. Since the World Cup it has been managed by the Seoul Metropolitan Facilities Management Corporation (SMFMC). FC Seoul moved to the Seoul World Cup Stadium in 2004.

== Design ==
The Seoul World Cup Stadium is the 2nd largest football-specific stadium in Asia. The roof has the unique shape of a traditional Korean kite. It is 50 meters high, is supported by 16 masts, and covers 90% of the stadium's seats. The structure is clad with fiberglass fabric and polycarbonate glazing that is designed to resemble hanji, traditional Korean paper. At nighttime, lighting installed in the structure creates illumination similar that of to a traditional Korean lamp.

== Notable football events ==
=== 2002 FIFA World Cup ===
The Seoul World Cup Stadium was one of the venues of the 2002 FIFA World Cup, and held the following matches:

Date	Team 1	Result	Team 2	Round	Attendance
31 May 2002	France	0–1	Senegal	Group A (opening match)	62,561
13 June 2002	Turkey	3–0	China	Group C	43,605
25 June 2002	Germany	1–0	South Korea	Semi-finals	65,256

=== 2007 FIFA U-17 World Cup ===
The Seoul World Cup Stadium was the main venue of the 2007 FIFA U-17 World Cup, and held the following matches:

Date	Team 1	Result	Team 2	Round
9 September 2007	Ghana	1–2	Germany	Third place match
9 September 2007	Spain	0–0 (a.e.t.) (0–3 pen.)	Nigeria	Final

=== 2013 AFC Champions League Final ===
The Seoul World Cup Stadium was the first leg venue of the 2013 AFC Champions League Final.

26 October 2013
19:30 UTC+9

FC Seoul (South Korea)	2–2	(China) Guangzhou Evergrande
Escudero 11'; Damjanović 83'	Report	Elkeson 30'; Gao Lin 58'

Attendance: 55,501
Referee: Ravshan Irmatov (Uzbekistan)

== Tenants ==
Exterior view of stadium

- The home of Korea Republic national football team since 2001.
- The home of K League 1 club FC Seoul since 2004.

== Events ==
- 2004: Sangam CGV Multiplex Cinema in the World Cup Mall at the Stadium was used as the filming location for Seoul Broadcasting System (SBS)'s drama Lovers in Paris. It was used as the cinema CSV of Baek Seung-kyung, Ki-joo's ex-wife, played by Park Shin-yang, also where Tae-young, played by Kim Jung-eun, worked and had the pajama party.
- 4th, 5th, and 6th Asia Song Festival, organised by Korea Foundation for International Culture Exchange (KOFICE), from 2007 to 2009.
- 2009 Dream Concert – 10 October 2009
- 2010 Dream Concert – 22 May 2010
- 2011 Dream Concert – 28 May 2011
- 2012 Dream Concert – 12 May 2012
- Psy's Happening Concert – 13 April 2013
- 2013 Dream Concert – 11 May 2013
- 2014 Dream Concert's 20th Anniversary: I Love Korea – 7 June 2014
- SM Town Live World Tour IV – 15 August 2014
- 2014 League of Legends World Championship finals – 19 October 2014
- 2015 I Love Korea Dream Concert – 23 May 2015
- 70th anniversary of Independence I Am Korea Concert – 15 August 2015
- Sechs Kies's Reunion Concert – 14 April 2016
- 2016 I Love Korea Dream Concert – 4 June 2016
- Big Bang concert 0.TO.10 – 20 August 2016
- 2017 Dream Concert – 3 June 2017
- G-Dragon concert – Act III: M.O.T.T.E World Tour – 10 June 2017
- SM Town Live World Tour VI – 8 July 2017
- 2018 Dream Concert – 12 May 2018
- 2019 Dream Concert – 18 May 2019
- BTS pre-recorded performance for the 2020 Mnet Asian Music Awards – 6 December 2020
- Host closing ceremony of 25th World Jamboree 2023 – 11 August 2023
- Seventeen – Follow Tour encore – 28–29 April 2024
- Lim Young-woong concert – IM HERO - THE STADIUM – 25 and 26 May 2024
- IU concert – H.E.R.E.H. World Tour encore – 21–22 September 2024

== See also ==
- Dongdaemun Stadium
- Hyochang Stadium
- Mokdong Stadium
- Seoul Olympic Stadium
- List of football stadiums in South Korea
- Lists of stadiums

Preceded by Stade de France; Saint-Denis (Paris)	FIFA World Cup; Opening venue 2002	Succeeded by Allianz Arena; Munich
Preceded by Estadio Nacional; Lima	FIFA U-17 World Cup; Final venue 2007	Succeeded by National Stadium; Abuja
Preceded by Staples Center; Los Angeles	League of Legends World Championship; Final Venue; 2014	Succeeded by Mercedes-Benz Arena; Berlin
