= Roll-on/roll-off discharge facility =

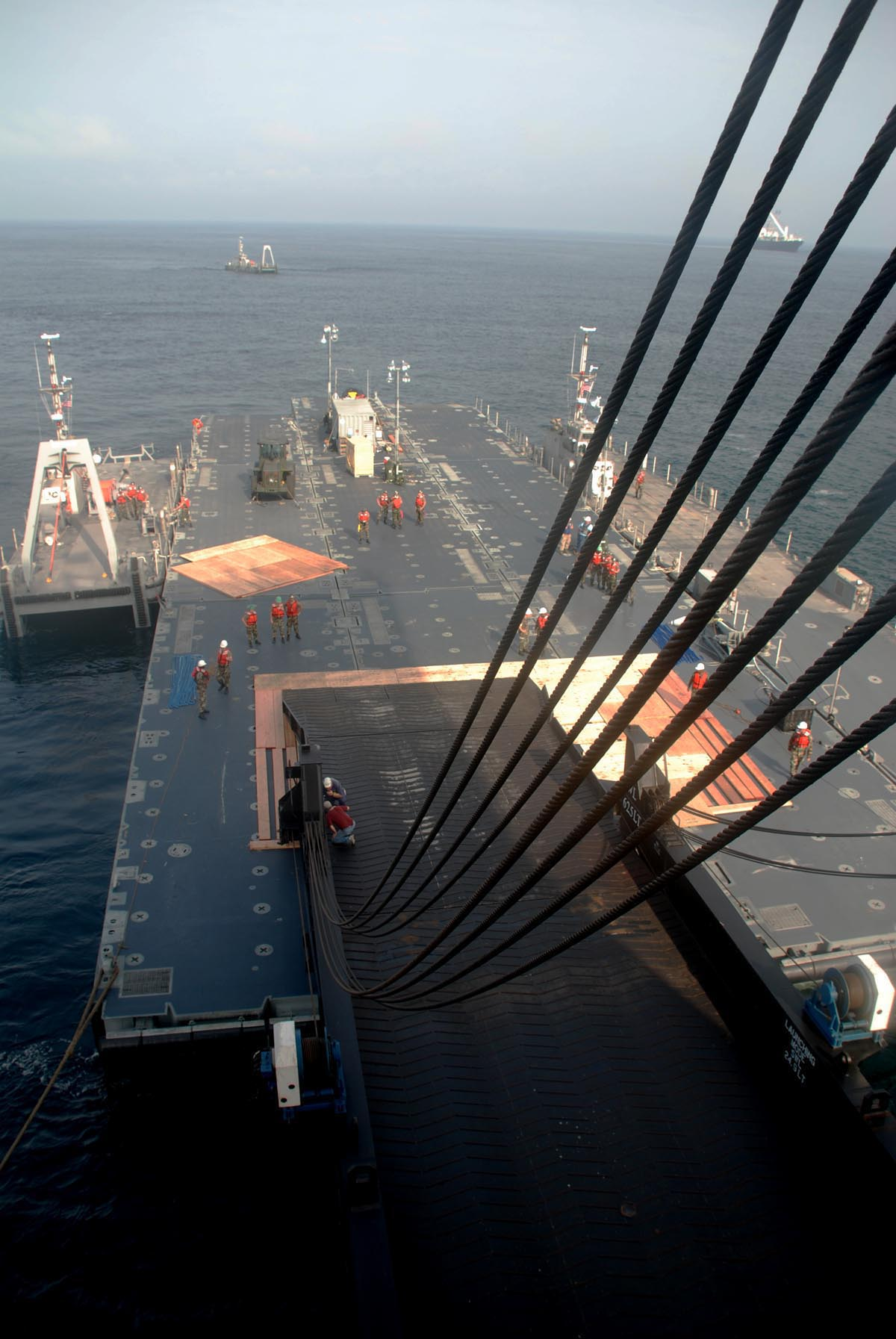
The ramp of the USNS Bobo connects the ship to a roll-on/roll-off discharge facility

A roll-on/roll-off discharge facility (RRDF) is a floating platform that provides a roadway between a ship's ramp and lighterage. It is constructed by connecting multiple causeway sections.

Ports equipped with roll-on/roll-off wharfs include:

City/Port	Country	Continent	Port Code
Antwerp/Port of Antwerp	Belgium	Europe	BEANT
Zeebruges/Port of Zeebrugge	Belgium	Europe	BEZEE
Aarhus/Port of Aarhus	Denmark	Europe	DKAAR
Copenhagen/Port of Copenhagen	Denmark	Europe	DKCOP
Esbjerg/Port of Esbjerg	Denmark	Europe	DKEBJ
Bremerhaven/Port of Bremerhaven	Germany	Europe	DEBRV
Gothenburg/Port of Gothenburg	Sweden	Europe	SEGOT
Kotka/Port of Kotka	Finland	Europe	FIKTK
Le Havre/Port of Le Havre	France	Europe	FRLEH
Oslo/Port of Oslo	Norway	Europe	NOOSL
Rotterdam/Port of Rotterdam	Netherlands	Europe	NLRTM
London/London Thamesport (LTP)	United Kingdom	Europe	GBRCS
Brisbane/Port of Brisbane	Australia	Oceania	AUBSA
Melbourne/Port of Melbourne	Australia	Oceania	AUMLB
Sydney/Port Jackson	Australia	Oceania	AUSYD
Adelaide/Port of Adelaide	Australia	Oceania	AUADL
Fremantle/Fremantle Harbour	Australia	Oceania	AUFRE
Auckland/Ports of Auckland	New Zealand	Oceania	NZAKL
Tauranga/Port of Tauranga	New Zealand	Oceania	NZTRG
Palmerston/Port of Palmerston	New Zealand	Oceania	NZPMS
New Plymouth/Port Taranaki	New Zealand	Oceania	NZNPL
Nelson/Port Nelson	New Zealand	Oceania	NZNON
Christchurch/Port of Christchurch	New Zealand	Oceania	NZCHC
Dunedin/Otago Harbour	New Zealand	Oceania	NZDNB
Timaru/PrimePort Timaru	New Zealand	Oceania	NZTIU
Invercargill/Port Invercargill	New Zealand	Oceania	NZIVC
Wellington/Wellington Harbour	New Zealand	Oceania	NZWGN
Dubai/Port Rashid	United Arab Emirates	Asia	AEDXB
Jeddah/Jeddah Seaport	Saudi Arabia	Asia	SAJED

== See also ==
- Roll-on/roll-off
- PLA Navy landing barges

== Sources ==
- Titan International Shipping/Roll-on Roll-off Wharfs
- Roll-on Roll-off
