= Guldager, Denmark =

Guldager
- Village
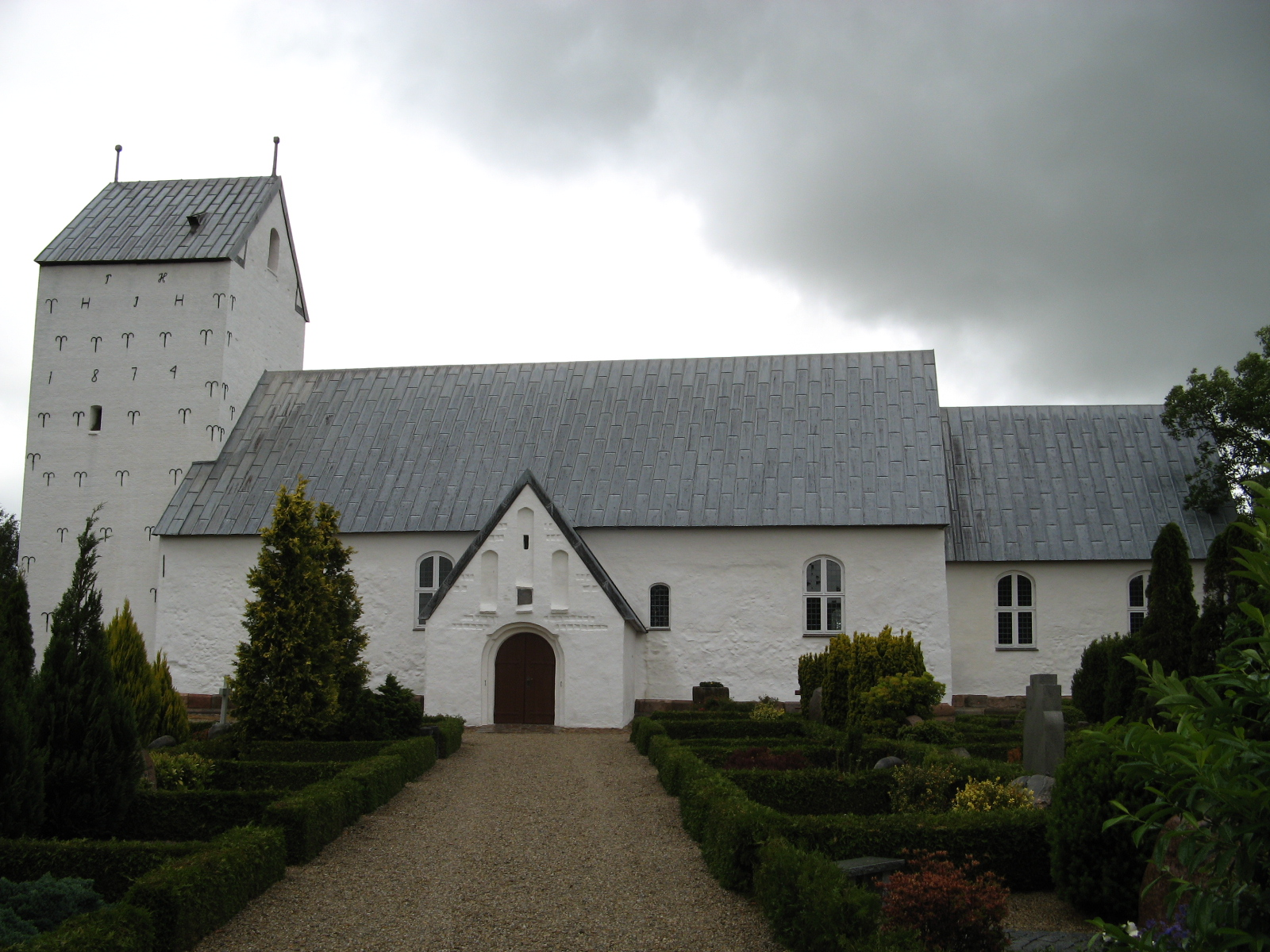
- Guldager Church

- Location within Region of Southern Denmark Location within Denmark
- Coordinates: 55°31′59″N 8°24′14″E
- Country: Denmark
- Region: Southern Denmark
- Municipality: Esbjerg Municipality

Population (2026)
  - Total: 949

Guldager is a village and northern suburb of Esbjerg, with a population of 949 (1 January 2026), in Esbjerg Municipality, Region of Southern Denmark in Denmark.

Guldager Church from the 12th century is located in the village.

Esbjerg International School is located on the eastern outskirts of the village.

Guldager Stationsby is located 2 km east of Guldager at the Esbjerg–Struer railway line.
