= Carl Auböck =

Four generations of Austrian artists and their eponymous company

Carl Auböck (also spelled Auboeck) is the name of members of the Auböck family, who owned and managed the Vienna-based Werkstätte Carl Auböck. The workshop, which was part of the Austrian art movement called Wiener Werkstätte and is known for its Modernist Design, has been run by Carl Auböck I, II, III, and IV for more than 120 years.

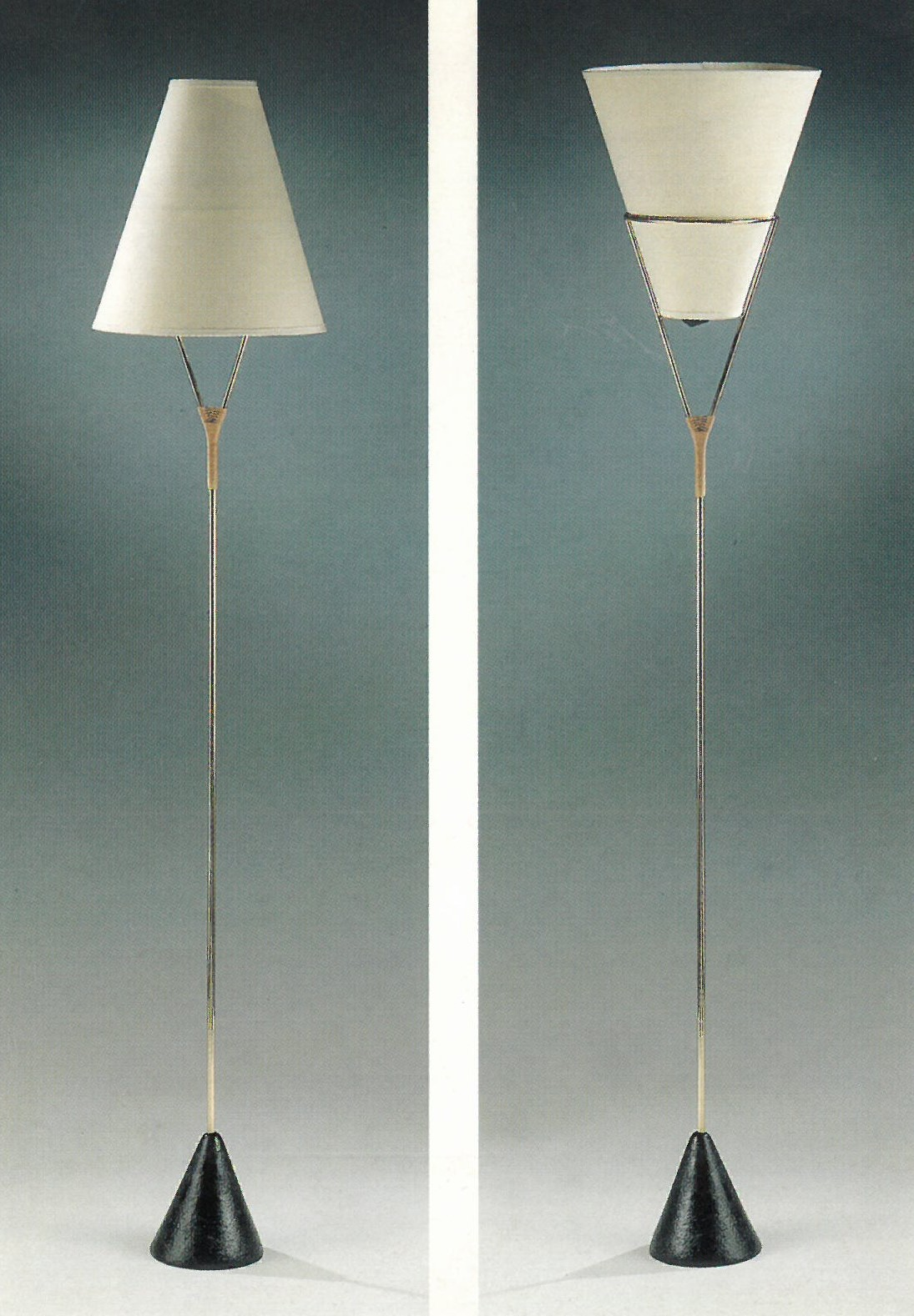
Floor lamp with reversible shade (1950)

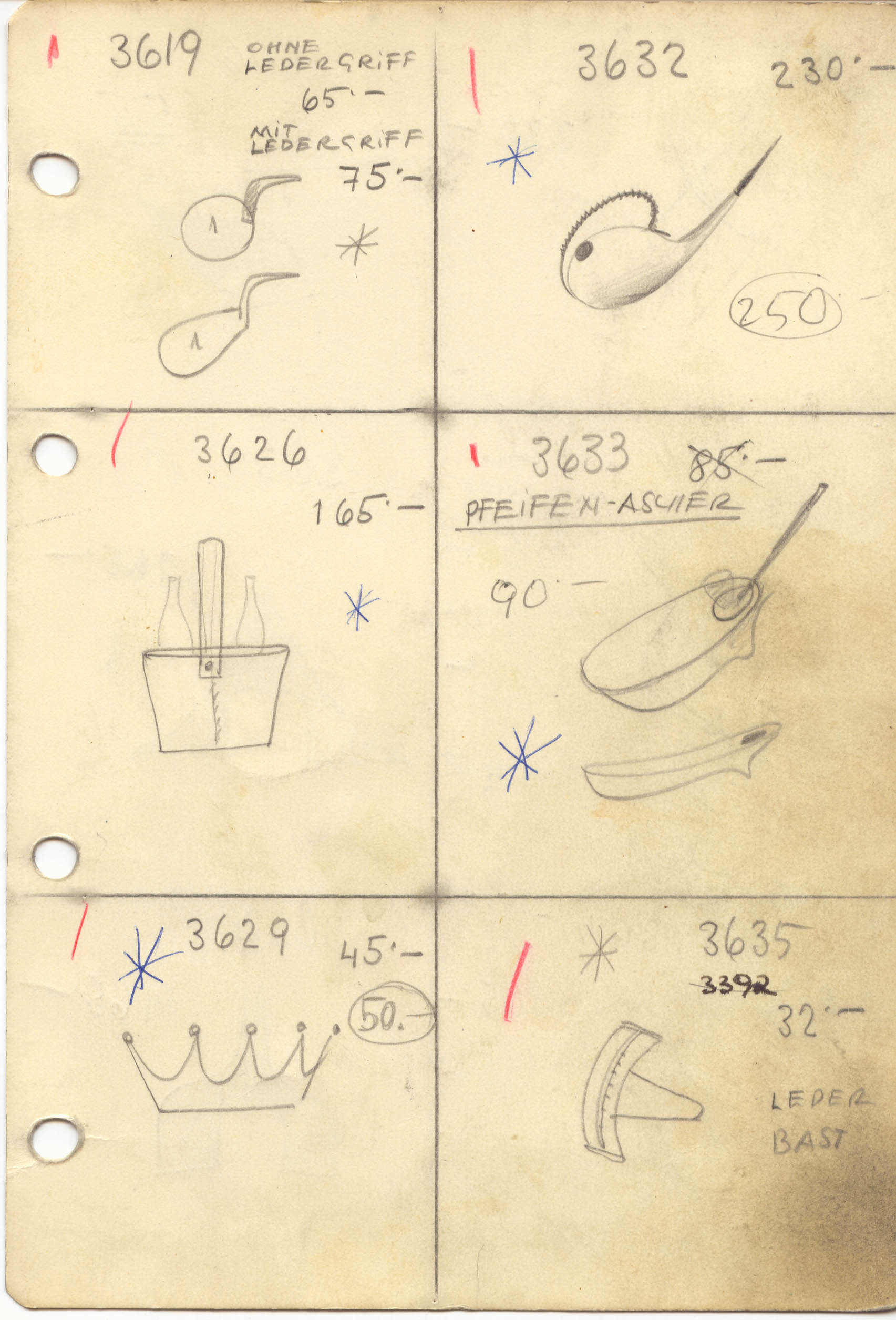
Hand drawn page from Carl Auböck catalogue (c. 1950)

== Carl Auböck I ==
Carl Auböck I or Karl Heinrich Auböck I was a goldsmith before he founded the family's workshop in 1906 at Bernardgasse as a bronze goods company. Auböck's workshop was particularly noted for the manufacture of the "Weiner Bronzen". These small, bronze figurines were popular collectibles in Austria until the early 20th century. Auböck died in 1925.

== Carl Auböck II ==
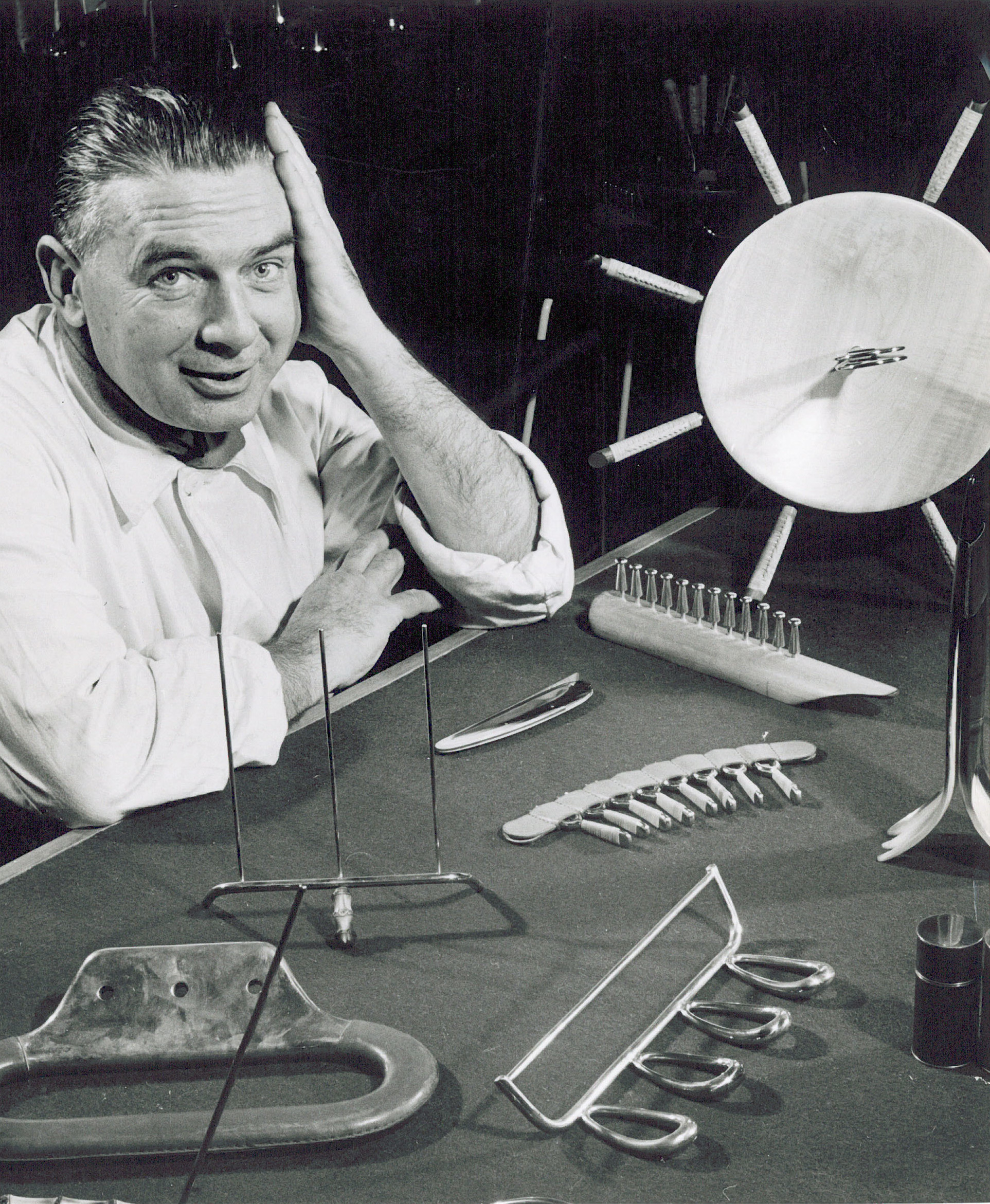
Carl Auböck II

Carl Auböck II (1900–1957) continued practicing in the workshop of his father (CAI) and began to introduce design changes that led the company towards the direction of Modernist Design, for which the workshop would be known. He first joined his father's workshop in 1925 after studying painting at the Vienna Academy of Fine Arts. He also attended art courses at the Bauhaus from 1919–1921 under Johannes Itten, a Swiss expressionist painter and designer. He became a leading figure of Austrian modernism.

After World War II, he further expanded the workshop, which was supported by the design demands of the American occupying force. Auböck adopted a strategy where a basic design had manifold varieties so that more than 500 new objects were produced in the workshop from 1946 to 1950. These designs were influenced by Bauhaus modernism. His works on smaller household and office objects during this period made Auböck a cult hero among his contemporaries.

In 1954, Auböck was awarded four gold medals during the Milan Triennale for designing a range of stylized metalware. Aside from his metal ware designs, Auböck is also known for his watercolor paintings.

== Carl Auböck III ==
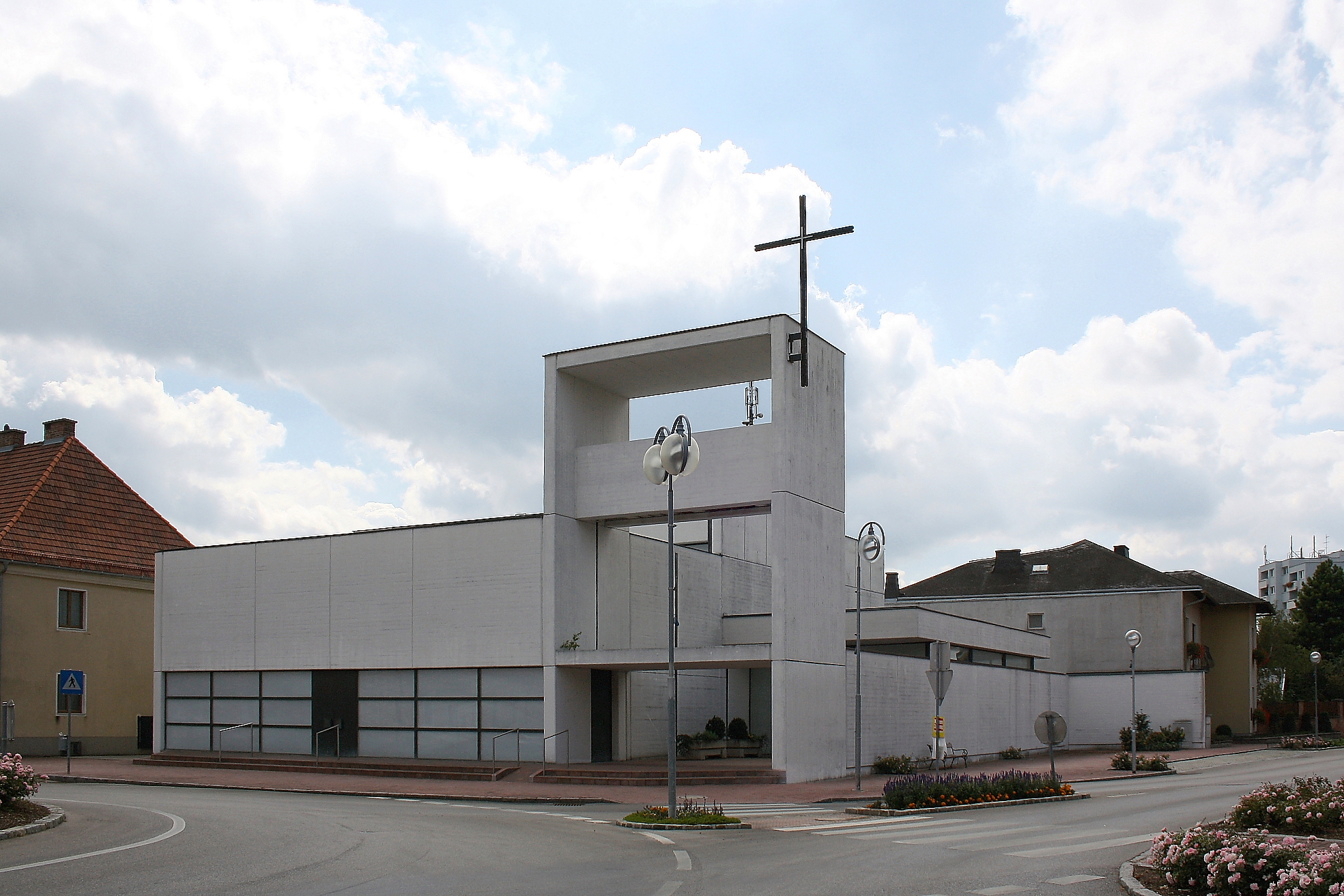
Möllersdorf church, the parish built by architect Carl Auböck III.

In his early years, Carl Auböck III (1924–1993) began collaborating with his father at the Werkstatte workshop. He began working as a Gürtler, which was part of the family's tradition. Unlike his predecessors, however, he is also noted as an architect. He completed an architecture degree at the Vienna University of Technology. Auböck has designed private houses, apartments, public, and industrial buildings not just in Austria but around the world. He was also an academic and the former president of the International Council of Societies of Industrial Design (ICSID).

Auböck also studied 1951 at Massachusetts Institute of Technology where he met Ludwig Mies van der Rohe, Walter Gropius, Ray Eames, and Charles Eames. These figures inspired Auböck to integrate American trends in the products designed at the workshop, making them more international and modern. Under his direction, the workshop achieved international status and started collaborating with other design houses such as Hermès and Pierre Cardin. Auböck has also designed for other companies such as Neuzeughammer Ambosswerke, Reichert, Tyrolia, Otto Groh, and Ostovics Tischkultur. He taught industrial design at the University of Applied Arts Vienna in 1997 and served as the president of the Austrian Design Institute.

Auböck III is also the father of Maria Auböck (1951), a noted Austrian landscape architect and educator. She is known for architectural works completed with János Kárász and as a president of the Central Association of Architects (ZV).

== Carl Auböck IV ==
Carl Auböck IV (born 1954) was also trained as a metal craftsman at the Werkstatte and, like his father also a practicing architect. Upon his father's death he managed the workshop with his mother Justine. Today he runs the Werkstätte Carl Auböck, overseeing the development of new design concepts for a 500-piece collection. He supervises the Carl Auböck archive and collaborates over the years with designers such as Michael Anastassiades, Lee West, Petar Petrov, Aldo Bakker, and Formafantasma, among others.
