= Ryu Choon-soo =

South Korean architect (born 1946)

Ryu Choon-soo (Korean: 류춘수; born November 18, 1946) is a prominent South Korean architect, educator, and artist. He worked under Kim Swoo-Geun who was a pioneer of Korean modern architecture. He designed many projects both in South Korea and abroad, including the Seoul World Cup Stadium and the 868 Towers Apartments in Haikou. Currently, he is the CEO at Beyond Space architect associates.

== Biography ==
Ryu Choon-su was born on November 18, 1946, in Bonghwa in North Gyeongsang province, South Korea. He graduated from Daegu High School in 1964 and majored in architecture in Hanyang University in 1970. After he graduated, he worked at General Architect Associates and Chonghap Architect Associates until 1974, and worked as the director of Space Group of Korea, which was established by Kim Swoo-geun. While working and learning under Kim Swoo-Geun, he also worked as a lecturer in the Architecture department of Hanyang University. Until 1986, he studied landscape architecture for a master's degree at the graduate school of environmental studies at Seoul National University. In 1986, he was one of the members who established Beyond Space Group, for which currently he is CEO. In 1990, he was appointed a board member of the Korean Institute of Architects, and in 1994, he was appointed as a National plan-check Committee Member in the Ministry of Construction of South Korea. In 2005, he became an expert advisor to the Cultural Properties Committee, and from 2008 to 2010, he served as member of the Presidential Commission on Architecture Policy under the regime of President Lee Myung-bak, the 10th president of South Korea.

== Major works ==
=== Han-Gae-Ryung service area building, 1982 ===
This service area is located within one of the most famous national parks in South Korea, Seoraksan National Park. This work shows more active approach of integration of tradition and modern through use of wooden material and traditional architectural factors. This work was awarded Korean Institute of Architects award of BEST-7 in 1983.

=== Olympic Gymnastic Stadium, 1986 ===
Olympic Gymnastic Stadium was built for gymnastic games of 1988 Seoul Olympics. Choon-Soo Ryu used cable tension structure for the roof structure of the stadium for the very first time in the world with Dr. Owen Geiger who was the expert of membrane structure. After they applied cable tension structure technique in this project, a lot of projects around the world started to implement this technique.

=== 868 Towers, 1992 ===
868 Towers is located in Hainan, China. This structure consists of two towers which have different height and functions. He tried to express the harmony of negative and positive which is oriental idea. A tower with 86 stories is for hotel and office, and expresses lightness and simplicity. Another one with 68 stories is residential tower, and expresses roughness and movement. Additionally, two towers are connected with the bridge. 868 Towers is significant because Choon-Soo Ryu intended to offer oriental paradigm, alternative to western concept of skyscrapers.

=== Seoul World Cup Stadium, 1997 ===
Seoul World Cup Stadium is the great example of Choon-Soo Ryu's work which realizes Korean beauty, modernism and rationality. Some formative concepts which were reflected in this stadium were octagonal base which represents richness and roof's membrane structure which was abstracted by Korean traditional Bangpae Kite. the stadium expresses regionality and symbolism as main stadium during 2002 World Cup and gives structural efficiency and functional rationality which is required for major sports stadium.

== Other works ==
1. Wonju Chi-Ak gym, Wonju, South Korea, 1979
2. Busan Sajik baseball stadium, Busan, South Korea, 1980
3. Sarawak Stadium, Kuching, Malaysia, 1986
4. Sam-Ha-Ri residential houses, 1986
5. Ritz-Carlton Hotel, Seoul, South Korea, 1989
6. National Busan traditional music hall, Busan, South Korea, 2003
7. Departement of art and culture building of Kunkook University, Seoul, South Korea, 2004
8. Hainan 2020 Town, Hainan, China, 2006
9. Tongyeong maritime sports center, Tongyeong, South Korea, 2009

== Awards ==
1. Gold Medal "Quaternario 88" International Award / 88 Seoul Olympic Gymnastics Stadium, 1988
2. '95 Korean Architecture Awards / The Ritz-Carlton Hotel Seoul, 1995
3. The Duke Edinburgh Fellowship award, 2000
4. Seoul architect a gold prize / Seoul World Cup Stadium, 2000
5. IOC/IAKS award, 2007
6. AIA Honorary Fellowship, 2008
7. Okgwan Order of Culture Merit, 2011

== Bibliography ==
1. The Difference of Landscape Interpretation Between East and West / No.185 Space magazine, 1982
2. A Study on The Master Plan for '88 Seoul Olympic Memorial Park and Doonchon, 1985
3. How a Frog Understands the Ocean / Architectural Column, 1999
4. PA-Architect/Ryu Choon-Soo / Archiworld&PA
