= Roberto Barni =

Italian sculptor (born 1939)

Roberto Barni (born 1939) is an Italian sculptor.

== Biography ==
Roberto Barni was born in Pistoia. He began his public career in 1960 with exhibitions in Pistoia and Florence. His works, exhibited also in Rome in 1963, included paintings, photographs, casts, sculptures and topographies.

Between 1986 and 1987 he had a studio in New York City, and had various exhibitions including a solo display at the Queens Museum. In 1985 he participated in the show on Italian art at the Hirshhorn Museum of Washington DC and the Akron Art Museum in Ohio, and in 1987 at the Avant-Garde in the Eighties exhibition at the Los Angeles County Museum of Art. He also participated in an exhibition of contemporary Italian art at the Seibu Gallery in Tokyo. He has continued to exhibit across the globe. His slender figures often recall the work of the Swiss sculptor Giacometti.

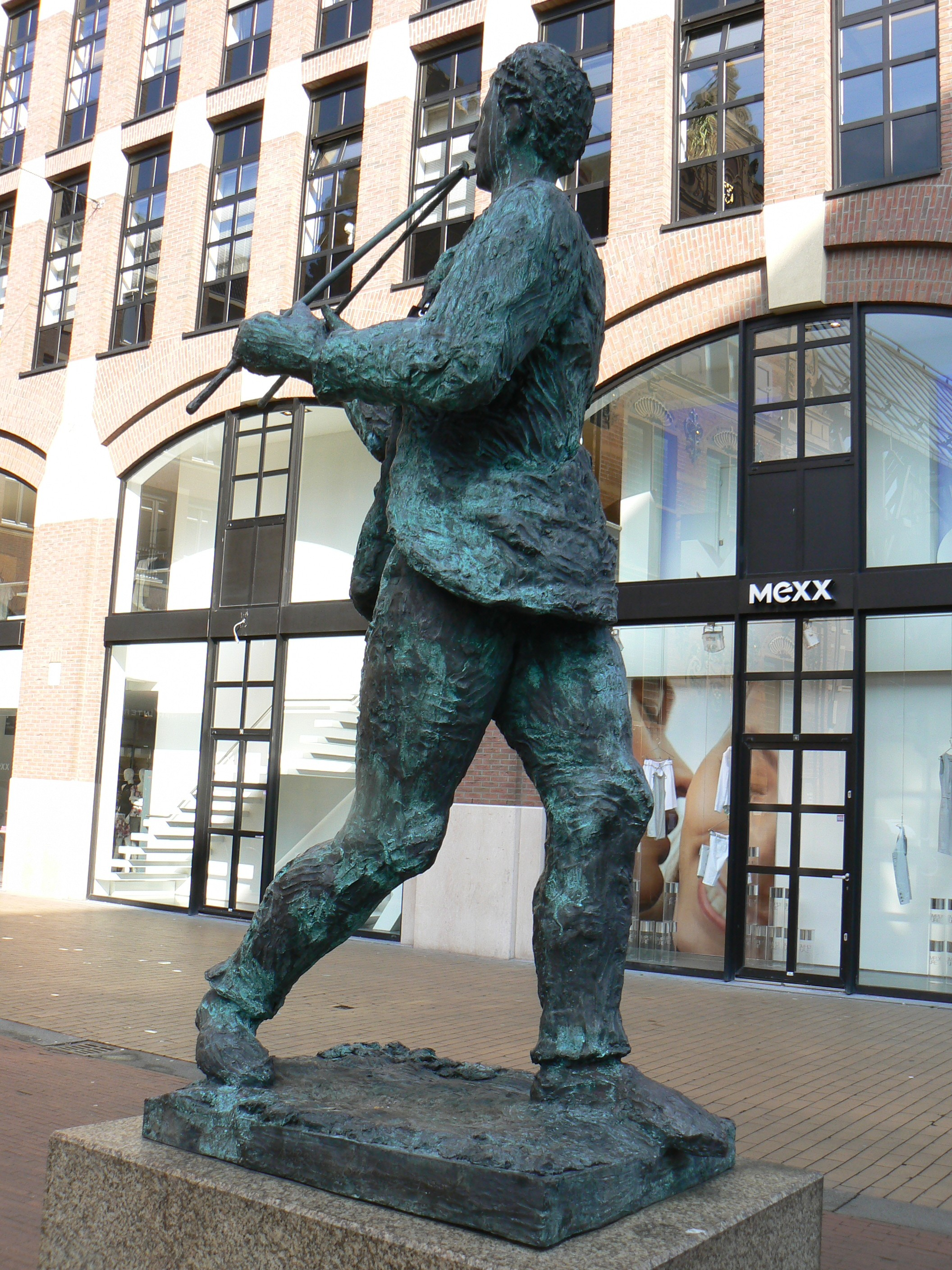
sculpture by Roberto Barni (1996) in Groningen/The Netherlands

Among his public works are the Giro del Sole statuary group in Pistoia and I passi d’oro (The Golden Strides) monument high on a wall on the right side of the Uffizi building on Via dei Georgofili in Florence, in memory of the five deaths of the Uffizi bombing in 1993. For the unveiling of the monument in 2013, he stated:

“From the first moment [...] I wanted to create a work that, rather than simply remembering those who are no longer with us, evokes them in life. I imagined a figure able to bring them back among us. A figure suspended above who seems to emanate from this historic location, a place that also sustained wounds. A figure who represents art and its perennial attempt to overcome tragedy in an act of existence. [...] I wanted to use immortal materials such as bronze, but especially gold whose light chases away the shadows. I thought that, on top of a blade that symbolizes death, there should be a figure, like Victory or Nike, who carries the five golden figures along with its decisive stride, remembering these human beings in the fullness of life, in their homes, walking their streets. [...] A figure who symbolizes art, whose wanderings are constantly driven by a desire to continue its journey, who has unexpectedly found itself here on the highest wall of one of the world's most important places under threat from barbarity”

== Bibliography ==
- Alberto Boatto, Roberto Barni: Affezioni, Maschietto, Florence, 1997
- Lóránd Hegyi, Alberto Boatto, Gianni Pozzi, Maurizio Vanni, Roberto Barni: Gambe in spalla, Gli Ori, Pistoia, 2008
- Lorenzo Nannelli, Roberto Barni: Immobilità transitorie, Polistampa, Florence, 2009
