= Hjerting =

District of Esbjerg, Denmark

Coordinates: 55°31′33″N 8°21′25″E

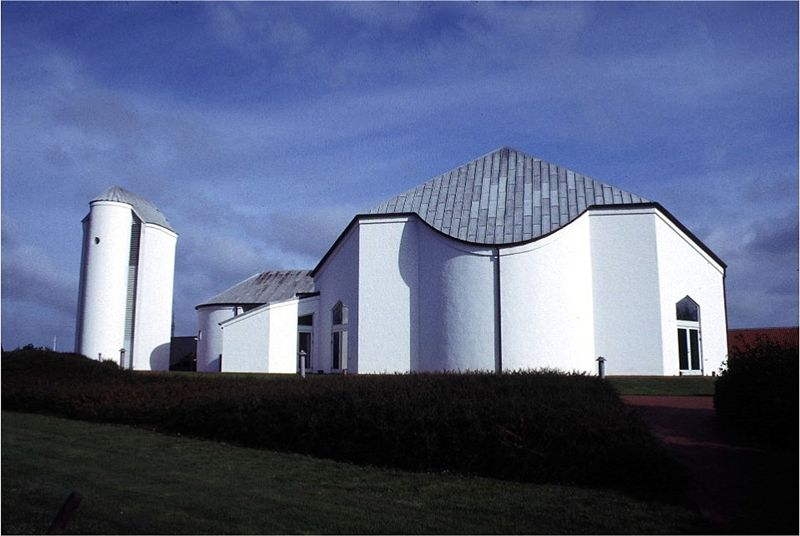
Hjerting Church

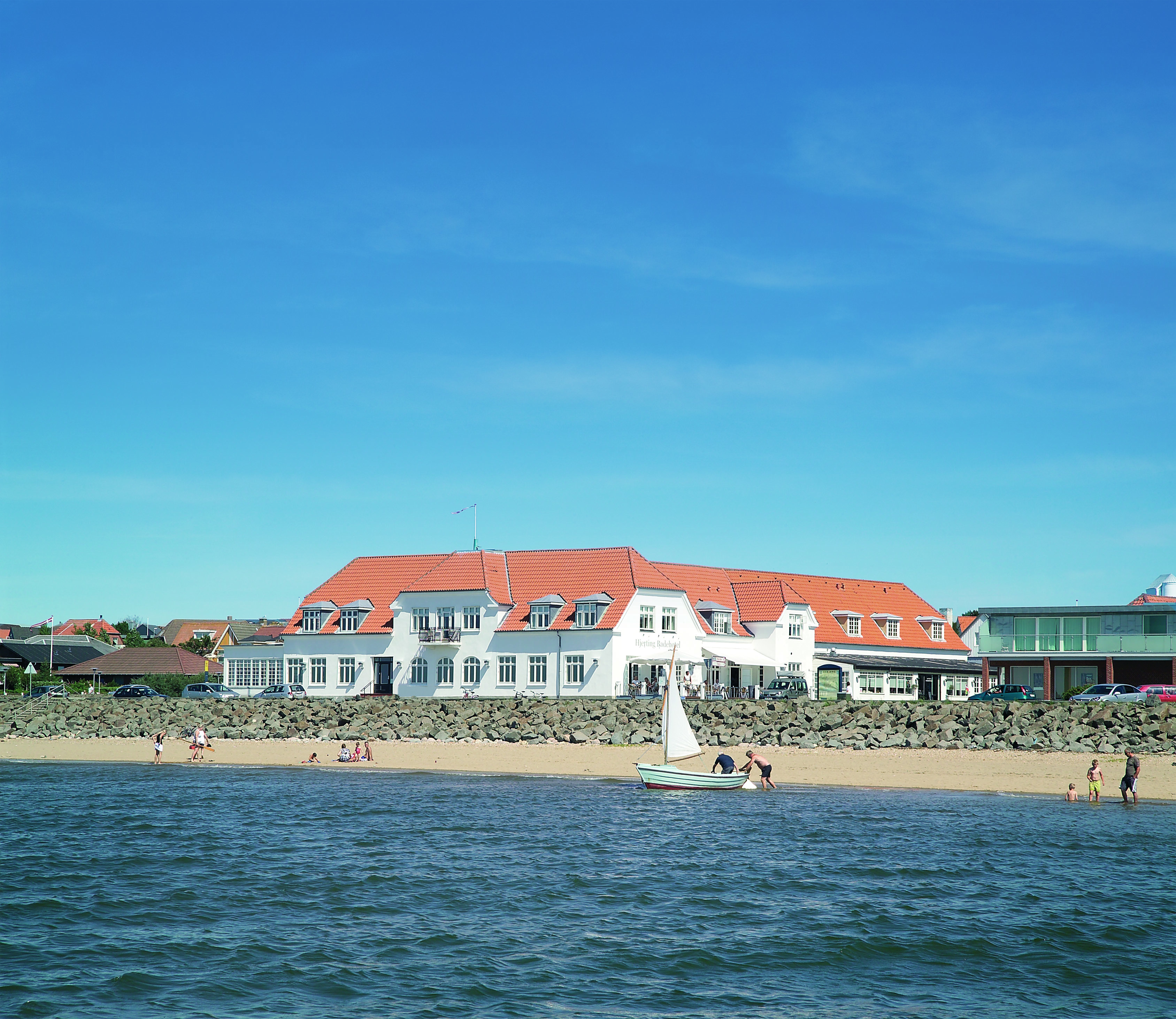
The Bade Hotel in Hjerting

Hjerting is a district of Esbjerg in southwest Jutland, Denmark, some 7 km (4.3 mi) north of the centre. As of 2011, it has 7,289 inhabitants. With a history as a fishing village going back some 700 years it is now an exclusive suburb with views over the sandy beach and the Wadden Sea.

== History ==
Hjerting has a history going back over 700 years. It was originally a fishing village and port for Varde. In the mid-19th century, meat was exported from Hjerting to England until Esbjerg Harbour was developed. The housing estate which has been extended since 1960 is located on the coast with views out to the Skallingen peninsula. Hjerting Church, completed in 1992, was designed by Alan Havsteen-Mikkelsen.

== The district today ==
Today Hjerting is a pleasant seaside resort and an exclusive suburb overlooking the bay of Ho Bugt on the Wadden Sea. In addition to the views out over the bay, the main attraction is the sandy beach which has a reddish colour. Thanks to the Skallingen peninsula to the west, the water is usually calm.

Large private villas line the coast road, rather like those in the north of Zealand. The octagonal church from 1992 with a separate tower looks a little like a modern version of a medieval castle. Inside, the impressive round nave is illuminated by natural light from above. The chancel is decorated with figures crafted by Robert Jacobsen.
