= Benjamin Mouton =

French architect

Benjamin Mouton (born 10 October 1948) is a French architect. He is architecte en chef des monuments historiques and until 2013 was inspector general of historic monuments.

== Life ==
The son of a physician, Benjamin Mouton was born in the 15th arrondissement of Paris and studied in Georges-Henri Pingusson's studio at the école nationale supérieure des beaux-arts then in the UP6 à l'école nationale supérieure d'architecture de Paris.

== Awards ==
Benjamin Mouton is a knight of the Légion d'honneur, officer of the Ordre national du Mérite and commander of the Ordre des Arts et des Lettres. He is also commander of the Ordre du Mérite culturel and honorary member of the Romanian national commission for historic monuments.
