= Fisheries and Maritime Museum, Esbjerg =

Coordinates: 55°29′22″N 8°24′42″E

Fisheries and Maritime Museum
- Fiskeri- og Søfartsmuseet
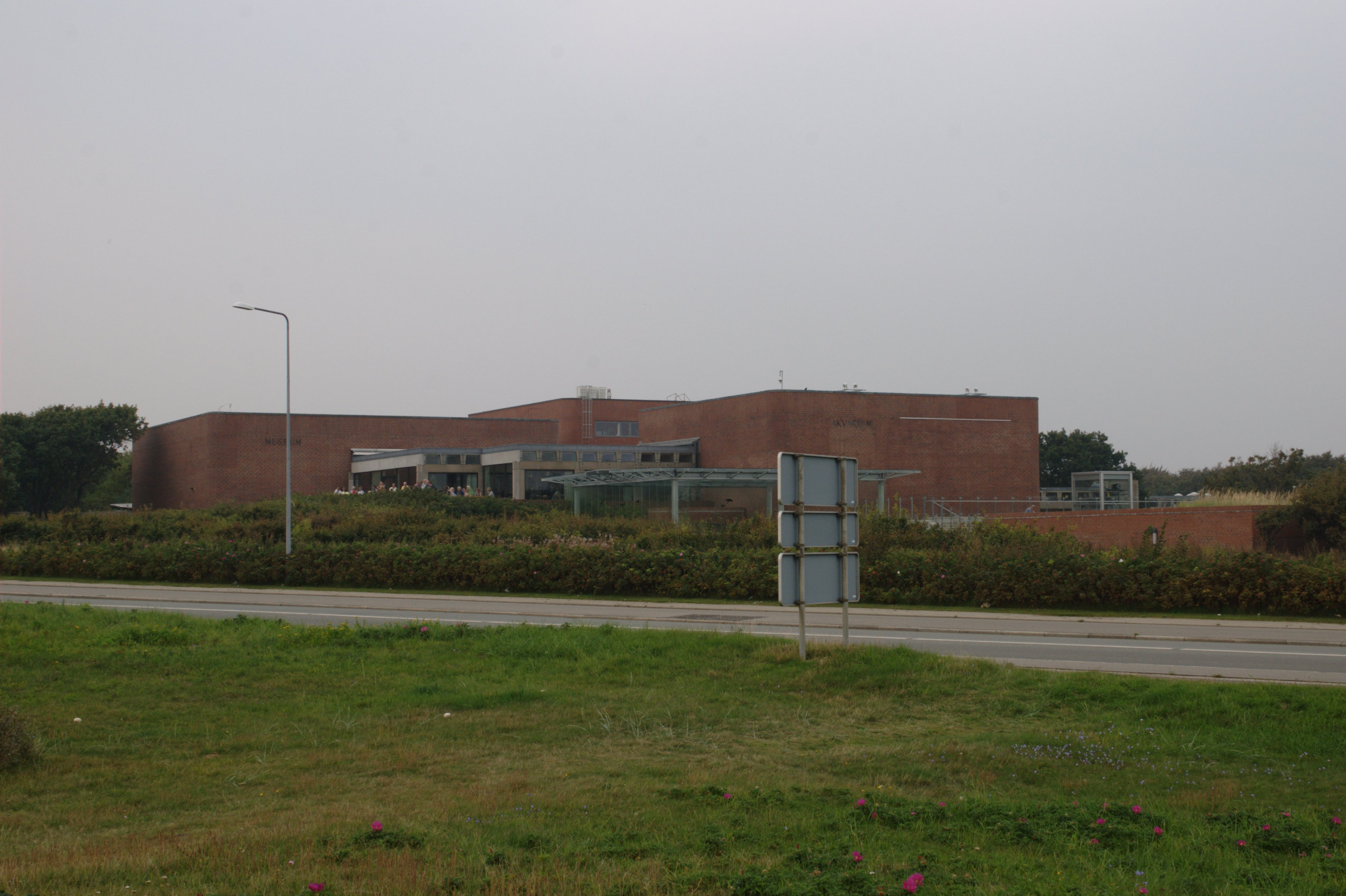
- Established: 1968; 58 years ago
- Location: Esbjerg, Denmark
- Website: www.fimus.dk/en/

The Fisheries and Maritime Museum (Danish: Fiskeri- og Søfartsmuseet) is a privately owned museum in Esbjerg, Denmark. Opened to the public in 1968, it consists of a saltwater aquarium for native species and a "sealarium" (exhibit for seals) as well as indoor and outdoor exhibitions on Danish fisheries and shipping.

== History ==
The idea of creating a Danish fisheries museum with an aquarium came from the journalist Hakon Mielche in 1941. In 1962, a planning committee was formed in Esbjerg which soon led to the collection of artefacts. Building began in 1966, allowing the privately owned institution to be opened to the public in 1968. From the start, the museum contained a fisheries exhibition and a saltwater aquarium. A sealarium was added in 1976. In 1989 a start was made on an outdoor exhibition which was later extended. The museum established a research unit in 1994, followed in 2000 by the Centre for Maritime and Regional Studies (Center for Maritime og Regionale Studier), a cooperative venture with the University of Southern Denmark. In 1999, a five-storey museum building with almost 2,000 m^{2} (22,000 sq ft) of floor space was inaugurated, housing a new permanent exhibition, a library, storage rooms, an archive and offices. Provision was also made for temporary exhibitions while the educational facilities were modernized. A new saltwater aquarium was installed in 2002 and a new "sealarium" (exhibit for seals) in 2013. The largest aquarium tank contains 100,000 L (26,000 US gal) saltwater and is home to species such as cod, halibut, conger eel, gilthead seabream, greater spotted dogfish and thornback ray, while the sealarium contains 500,000 L (130,000 US gal) and is home to grey seal and harbour seal.

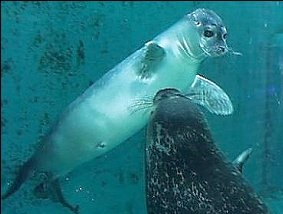
Harbour seal cub in the museum's former "sealarium" (a new was opened in 2013)

By 2007, the museum had welcomed six million visitors since its opening but thereafter, as a result of a considerable decrease in the number of Germans visiting Denmark, it experienced a few difficult years. By 2014, however, the museum was once again in good stead thanks to the enthusiasm of its staff and the support of Esbjerg Municipality.

== Sphere of interest ==
The museum addresses the areas of Danish fisheries, offshore activities, maritime environment, maritime mammals, shipping in the west of Jutland and the natural history of the Wadden Sea.

== Claus Sørensen E.1 ==
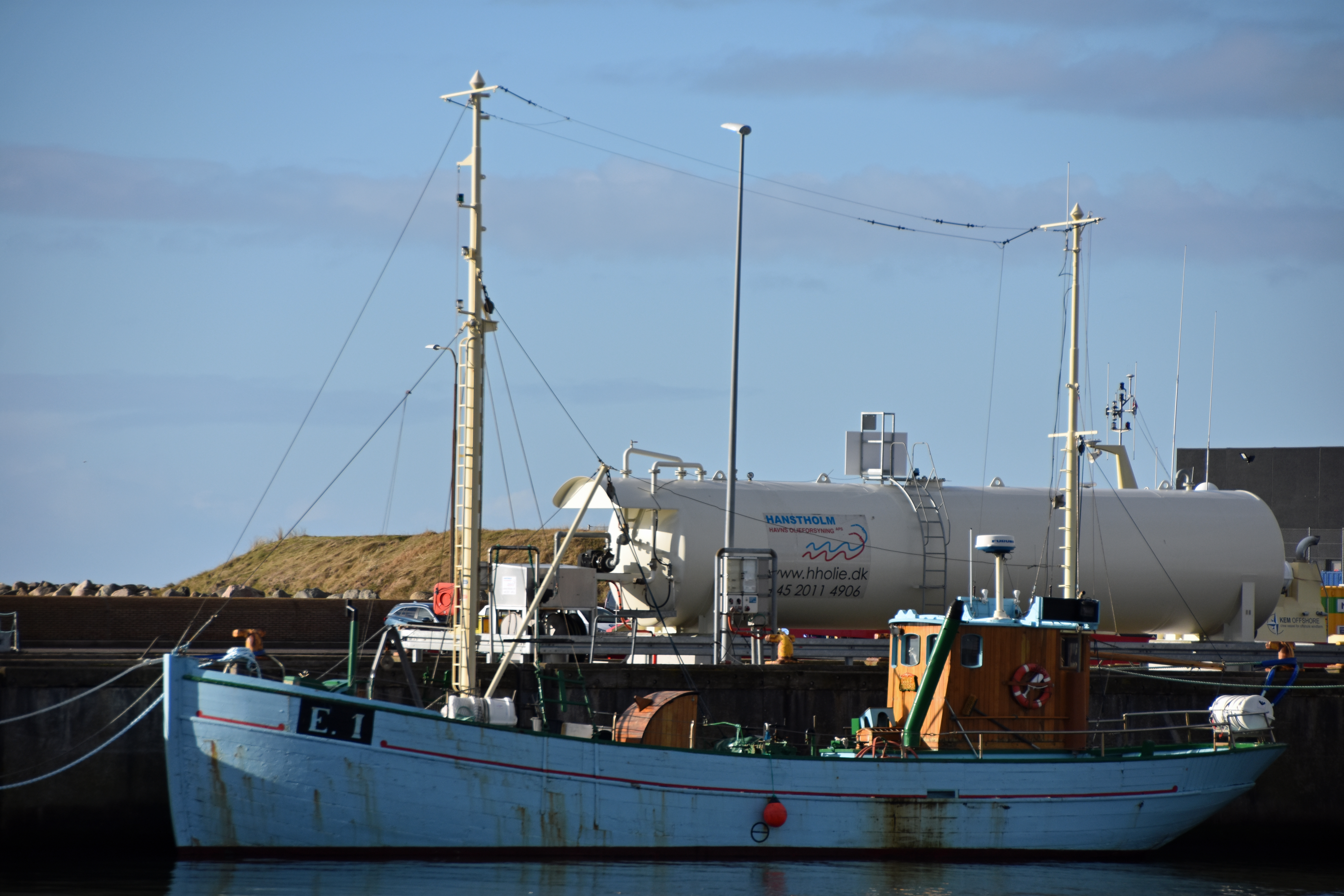
Claus Sørensen in Esbjerg harbour, 2019

The 1931-built Claus Sørensen E.1 is a preserved fishing cutter that is also used for educational tours around the port of Esbjerg and the Wadden Sea. She was built at the Søren Kjeldsen shipyard at Esbjerg as Godthaab (E.39), later becoming Zoar (E.39). When Zoar retired from fishing in 1978, she was purchased by the museum, renamed Claus Sørensen and renumbered E.1.

In November 2021 operation of E.1 was taken over by local shipowner Esvagt, for technical and safety matters, with the company's retired seafarers providing crew.

The previous E.1 was the Skagen cutter, Dana (S.49), now preserved ashore at the museum.

== Opening hours ==
Located at No. 2 Tarphagevej, some 4 km northwest of the centre of Esbjerg, the museum is open every day from 10 am to 4 pm with extensions to 5 or 6 pm as daylight permits.
