= Port of Esbjerg =

Esbjerg
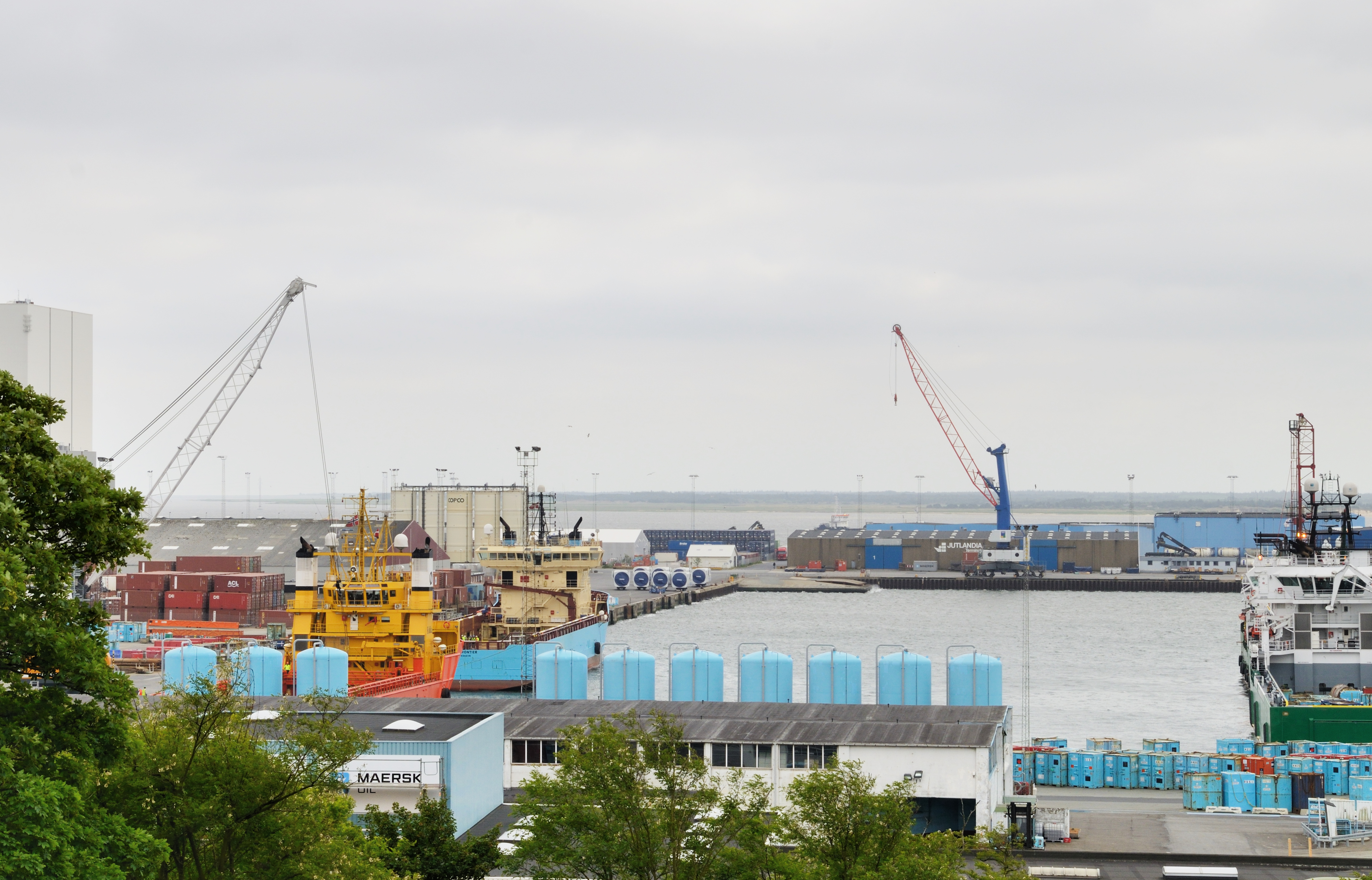
- Port of Esbjerg
- Interactive map of Esbjerg

Location
- Country: Denmark
- Location: North Sea
- Coordinates: 55°27′48″N 8°26′49″E
- UN/LOCODE: DKEBJ

Details
- No. of berths: 66
- Draft depth: 11.5 metres (38 ft)

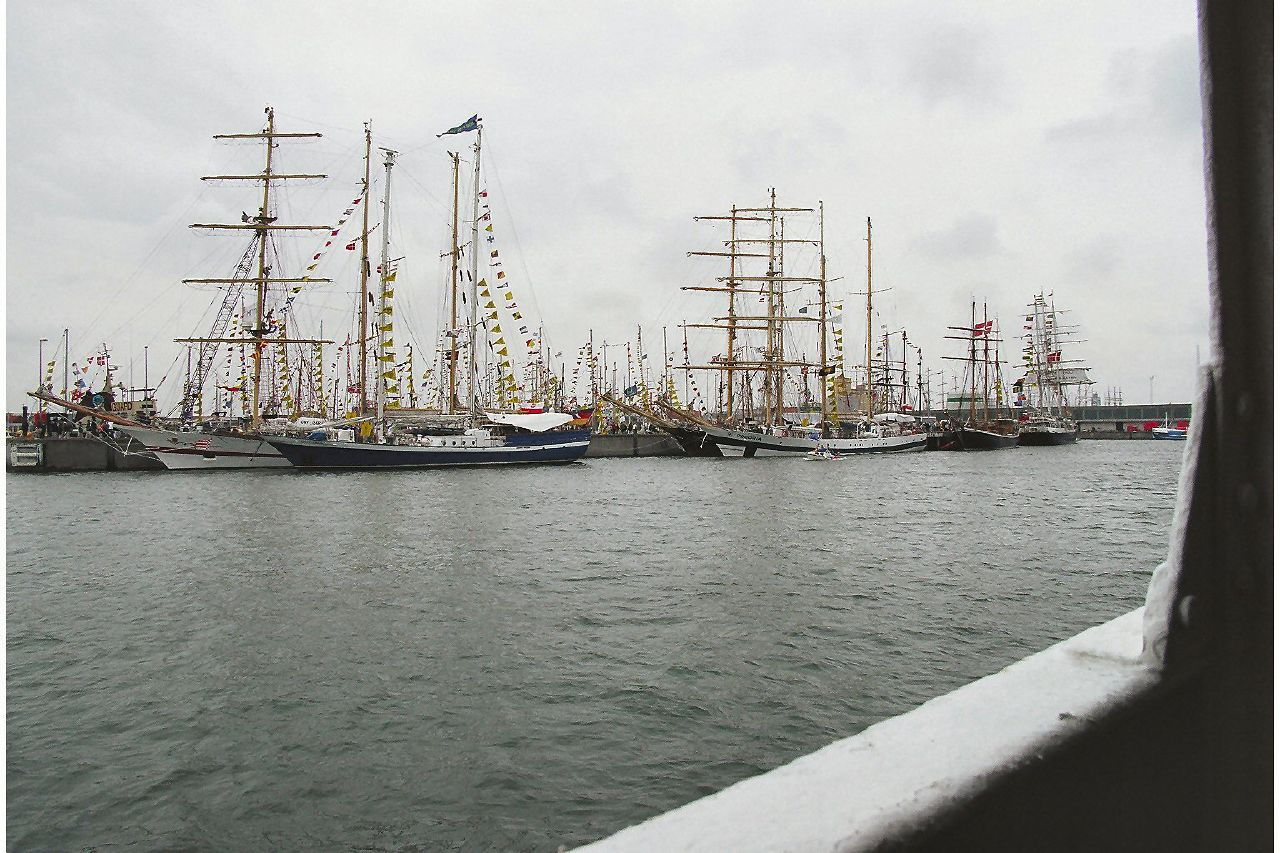
Sailing ships in Esbjerg Harbour

The Port of Esbjerg on the southwest coast of Jutland is a competitor to Aarhus and Hamburg for freight. Built by the State in 1868, it was once Denmark's principal fishing harbour but today has become Europe's leading port for shipping offshore wind turbines.

== History ==
Esbjerg was established in 1868 as a replacement for the harbour in Altona, which had previously been Denmark's most important North Sea port but came under German control after the Second Schleswig War in 1864. The harbour was officially opened in 1874. The same year, it benefited from Esbjerg's rail connection to Fredericia on the east coast of Jutland. The initial development of the harbour was completed in 1874. It quickly became a hub for exporting agricultural goods to England, especially butter and bacon. Thanks to the harbour's shipping facilities, by the end of the 19th century, livestock production in the surrounding region increased significantly. From the beginning of the 20th century, Esbjerg attracted fishermen from across the country, particularly for fishing plaice. Located some 25 km (16 mi), Blåvand Lighthouse has served traffic from the Port of Esbjerg since its construction in 1900.

The Port of Esbjerg was administered by the State until 2000 when it became privately controlled under Esbjerg Municipality. Today it is one of the four largest ports in Denmark enjoying a central position in the region's infrastructure. In addition to container and passenger traffic, it has attracted fish-processing activities and marine repair work as well as a wide variety of supporting services.

== Ferries ==
DFDS formerly operated an overnight passenger ferry to Harwich in the south of England, taking about 12 hours. The service ended on 29 September 2014 after 140 years. Over the years since there has been several rumors of a restart of passenger transport, but by September 2021 no new ferry service has been opened.

There were also ferry connections between Esbjerg and Newcastle but these have been discontinued. In the years leading up to 2014, the number of passengers using the port per annum averaged 1.8 million. DFDS has freight ferries to Port of Immingham.

== Harbour details ==
The Port of Esbjerg covers a total land area of 3.5 million m2 (1.35 sq miles), has 10 km (6.2 mi) of quays and an alongside depth of some 4.5 m (15 ft). The Tauruskay offshore wharf has a depth of 6.3 m (21 ft) while the bulk cargo Australienkaj, the Europakaj and the Vestkraftkaj for containers all have an alongside depth of 10.5 m (34 ft). The Englandskaj serving passenger traffic has a length of 310 m (1,020 ft) and an alongside depth of 7.6 m (25 ft) while the Færgehavn handling containers, passengers and ferries over a length of 420 m (1,380 ft) has an alongside depth varying from 4.4 m (14 ft) to 9.3 m (31 ft). Other wharfs include the Humberkaj for frozen cargoes, the Containerkaj for roll-on, roll-off containerized cargoes and the Oliebro for liquid bulk carriers.

In recent years, the port has handled some 4 million tons of cargo a year, of which some 500,000 tons have been liquid fuels.

== Offshore ==
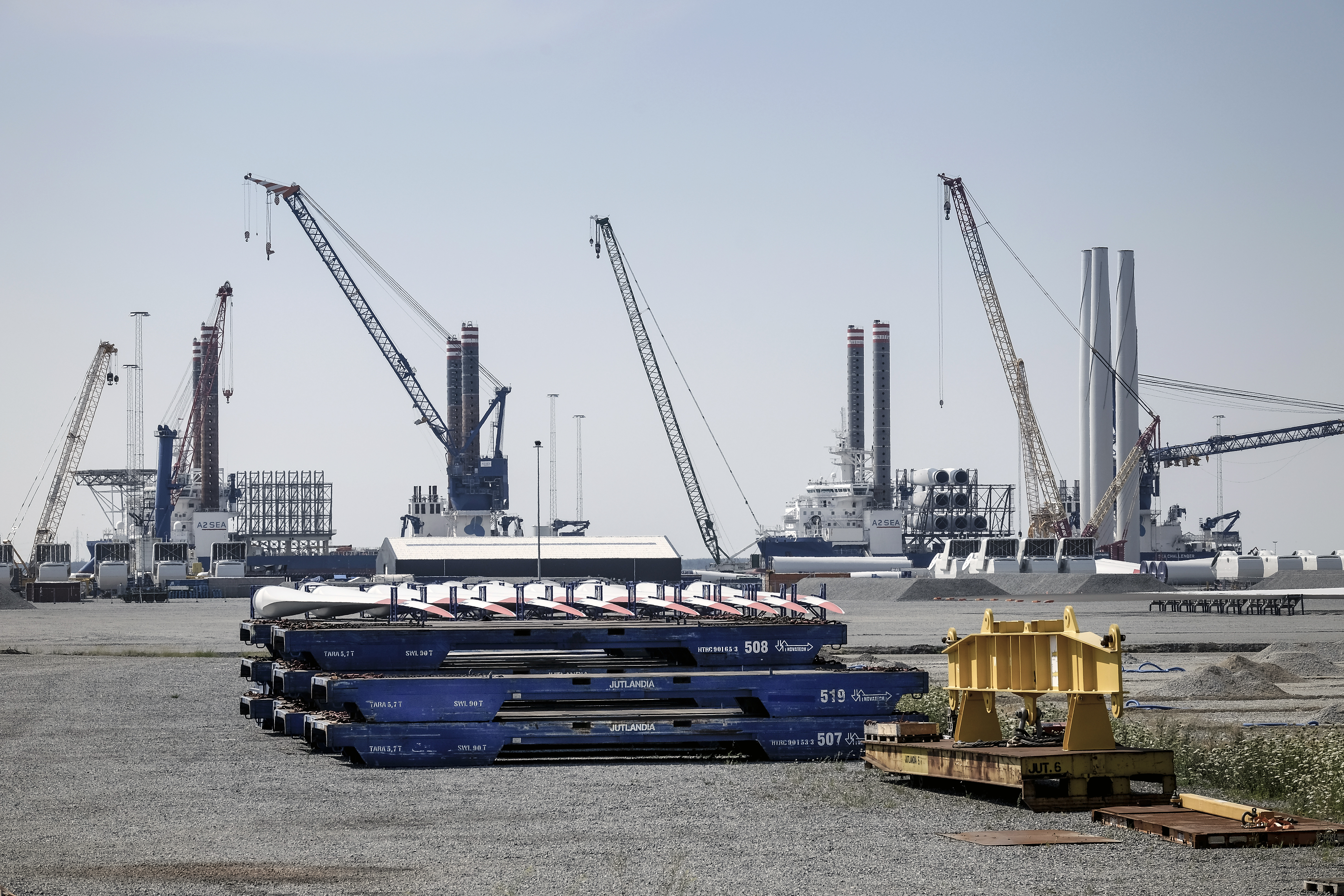
A portion of Esbjerg offshore wind port

Esbjerg has served the Danish offshore industry since oil and gas was first extracted from the North Sea in the early 1970s. More recently, it has become a centre for shipping offshore wind turbines. In addition to handling 65 percent of all Danish wind turbines (which now supply 3 GW of offshore wind power), the port has shipped components to various British wind farms. In order to cope with future increases in Danish offshore wind power, twelve companies including DONG Energy and Bluewater Energy Services are planning the establishment of a Green Offshore Centre in Esbjerg. In this connection, in June 2013 the port was significantly expanded with the opening of the Østhavn (East Harbour) covering an area of 650,000 m^{2} (7,000,000 sq ft). Further expansion started in 2017, including two roll-on/roll-off discharge facilities and a Liebherr crane lifting 300 tonnes. The port became the world's largest offshore wind port. 100,000 m^{2} (1,100,000 sq ft) is reserved for decommissioned wind turbines.

== See also ==
- Fisheries and Maritime Museum, Esbjerg, tracing the history of the region's fisheries and shipping
