= Esbjerg =

Esbjerg Esberg (German)
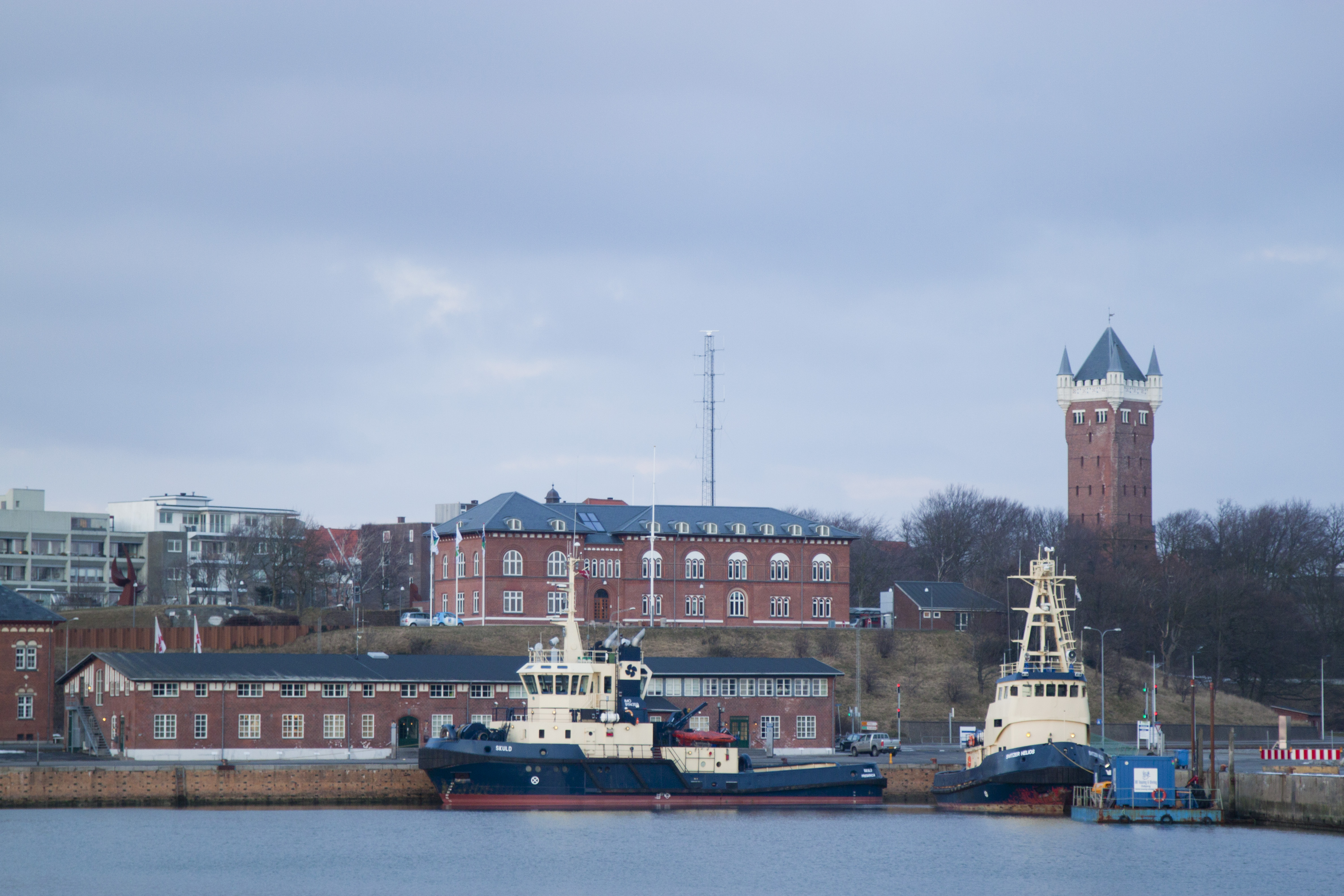
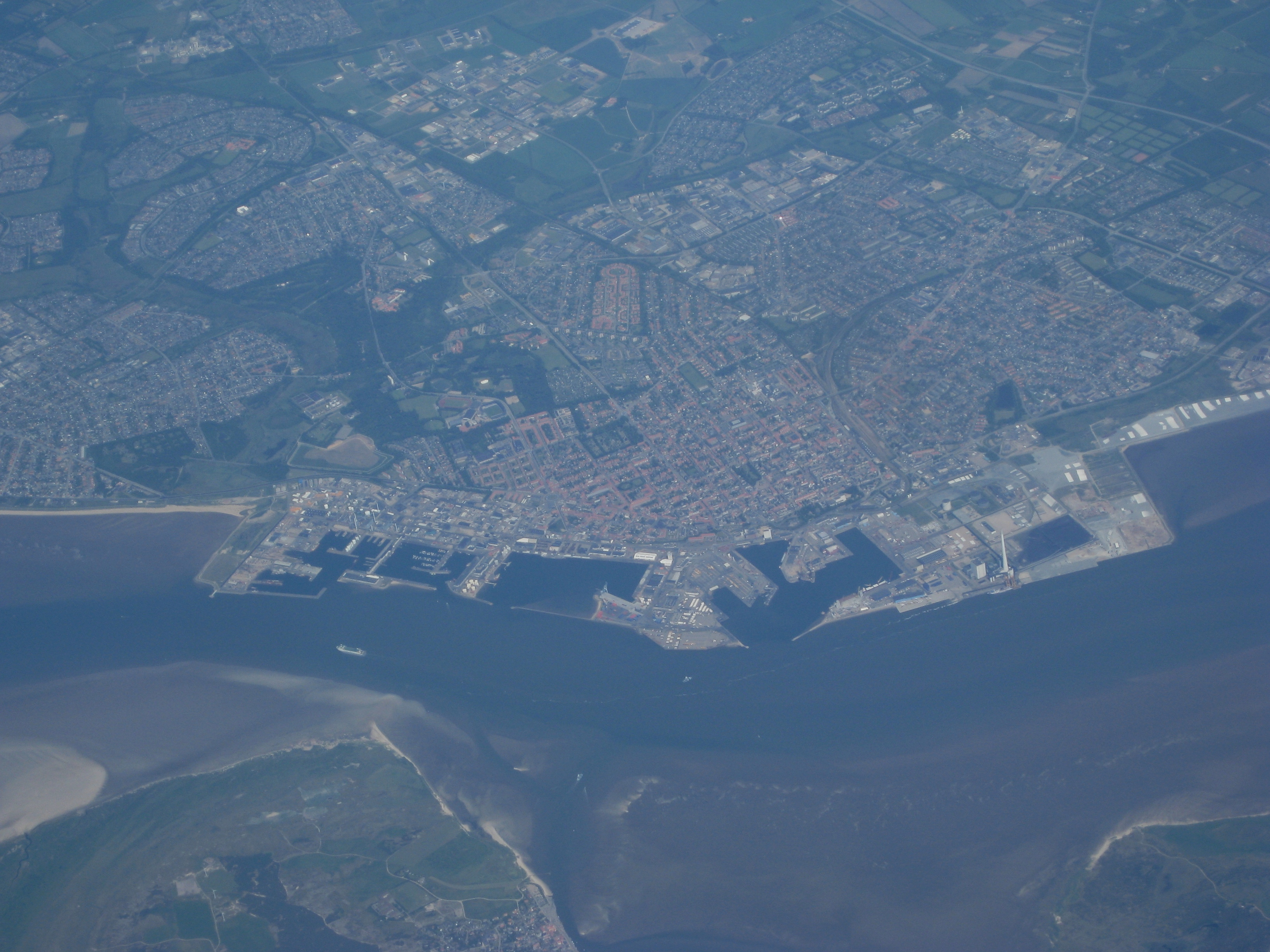
- Esbjerg harbour, aerial view of the city.

- Coat of arms

- Location in Denmark Esbjerg (Region of Southern Denmark)
- Coordinates: 55°29′N 08°27′E
- Country: Denmark
- Region: Southern Denmark (Syddanmark)
- Municipality: Esbjerg
- Established: 1868
- City charter: 1899
- Current municipality: 1 January 2007

Government
  - Mayor: Jesper Frost Rasmussen

Area
  - Urban: 43.8 km^{2} (16.9 sq mi)
- Elevation: 11 m (36 ft)

Population (1 January 2026)
  - Urban: 71,371
  - Urban density: 1,630/km^{2} (4,220/sq mi)
  - Municipal: 114,947
  - Gender: 35,661 males and 35,710 females
- Demonym: Esbjergenser
- Time zone: UTC+1 (CET)
  - Summer (DST): UTC+2 (CEST)
- Postal code: 6700-6715
- Area code: (+45) 7
- Website: esbjerg.dk

Esbjerg (Danish: [ˈesˌpjɛɐ̯ˀ], Jutish: [ˈɛspʲæa̯] German: Esberg) is a seaport city and seat of Esbjerg Municipality on the west coast of the Jutland peninsula in southwestern Denmark. By road, it is 71 kilometres (44 mi) west of Kolding and 164 kilometres (102 mi) southwest of Aarhus. With an urban population of 71,371 (1 January 2026) it is the fifth-largest city in Denmark, and the largest in West Jutland.

Before a decision was made to establish a harbour (now the second largest in Denmark) at Esbjerg in 1868, the area consisted of only a few farms. Esbjerg developed quickly with the population rising to 13,000 by 1901 and 70,000 by 1970. In addition to its fishing and shipping activities, it also became an important centre for agricultural exports. Over the years, many of the city's visitors have arrived by ferry from Harwich, Essex, England, but this service closed in September 2014 having run since 1875. The harbour facilities are being expanded to answer the needs of the wind-turbine industry and container shipping traffic.

The town has several notable museums and entertainment venues, including Esbjerg Art Museum, Esbjerg Museum and the privately owned Fisheries and Maritime Museum. The Esbjerg Performing Arts Centre was completed in 1997 to designs by Jan and Jørn Utzon. When approached by sea, the Man Meets the Sea is one of the prominent monuments, consisting of four 9-meter-tall (30-foot) white-coloured men, overlooking Sædding Beach. The sculpture was designed by Svend Wiig Hansen and installed in 1995. Esbjerg hosts branches of the University of Southern Denmark and Aalborg University, and is increasingly recognized for its university facilities and sporting activities. It is home to the Danish football club Esbjerg fB, who play their home matches at Blue Water Arena, and also has an ice hockey division called Esbjerg Elite Ishockey, which plays at the Granly Hockey Arena.

== History and economy ==
The town itself was not established until 1868 when it was built as a replacement for the harbour in Altona, which had previously been Denmark's most important North Sea port but came under German control after the Second Schleswig War in 1864. At the time, Esbjerg consisted of only a few farms. Developed under royal decree from 1868 until 1874, the harbour was officially opened in 1874, with rail connections to Varde and to Fredericia, an important hub on the east coast of Jutland. Initial planning of the town was conducted by chartered surveyor H. Wilkens in 1870 with streets laid out in the form of a rectangular grid. The market square (Torvet) was positioned at the centre, midway between the harbour and the railway station. From only 400 inhabitants at the beginning of the 1870s, the town and its population grew rapidly, with 1,529 residents mentioned in 1880, and 4,211 in 1890.

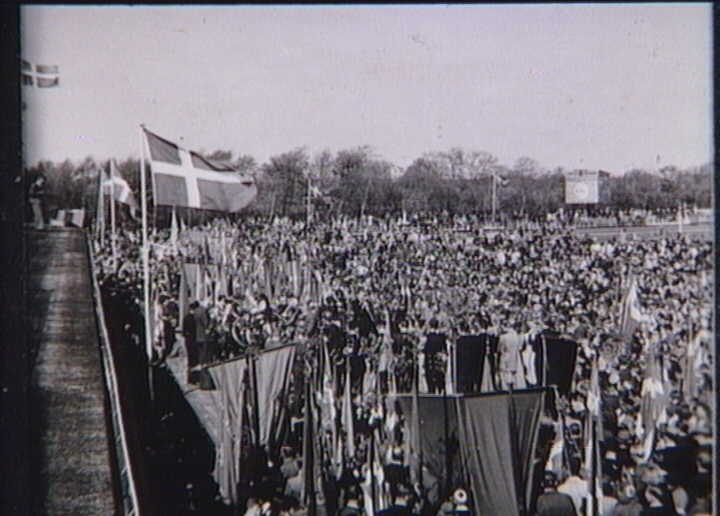
Esbjerg in May 1945

In 1893, Esbjerg became a municipality in its own right (initially known as Esbjerg Ladeplads), receiving the status and privileges of a market town in 1899 and incorporating the parish of Jerne (east of the centre) in 1945. A number of institutions and facilities were soon established, including the courthouse and town hall (1891), the gas and waterworks (1896) and the power plant (1907). From the beginning of the 20th century, Esbjerg prospered not only as a fishing port but also as one of the country's major export centres. Established in 1895 by nine local dairies, the butter-packaging factory, Dansk Andels Smørpakkeri, employed some 150 workers until 1920, packing and dispatching butter for the London market. It was later extended to include egg marketing under the name Dansk Andels Ægeksport. Ultimately, it handled produce from 140 dairies spread across the whole of Jutland. After the Second World War, the town developed several agricultural industries, especially meat processing and packaging with a plant employing over 300. The slaughterhouse and meat packaging facility, Esbjerg Andels-Slagteri, established in 1887, became Denmark's sixth largest by 1962. It later became part of Vestjyske Slagterier in 1986, and in 2001, it was acquired by Danish Crown.

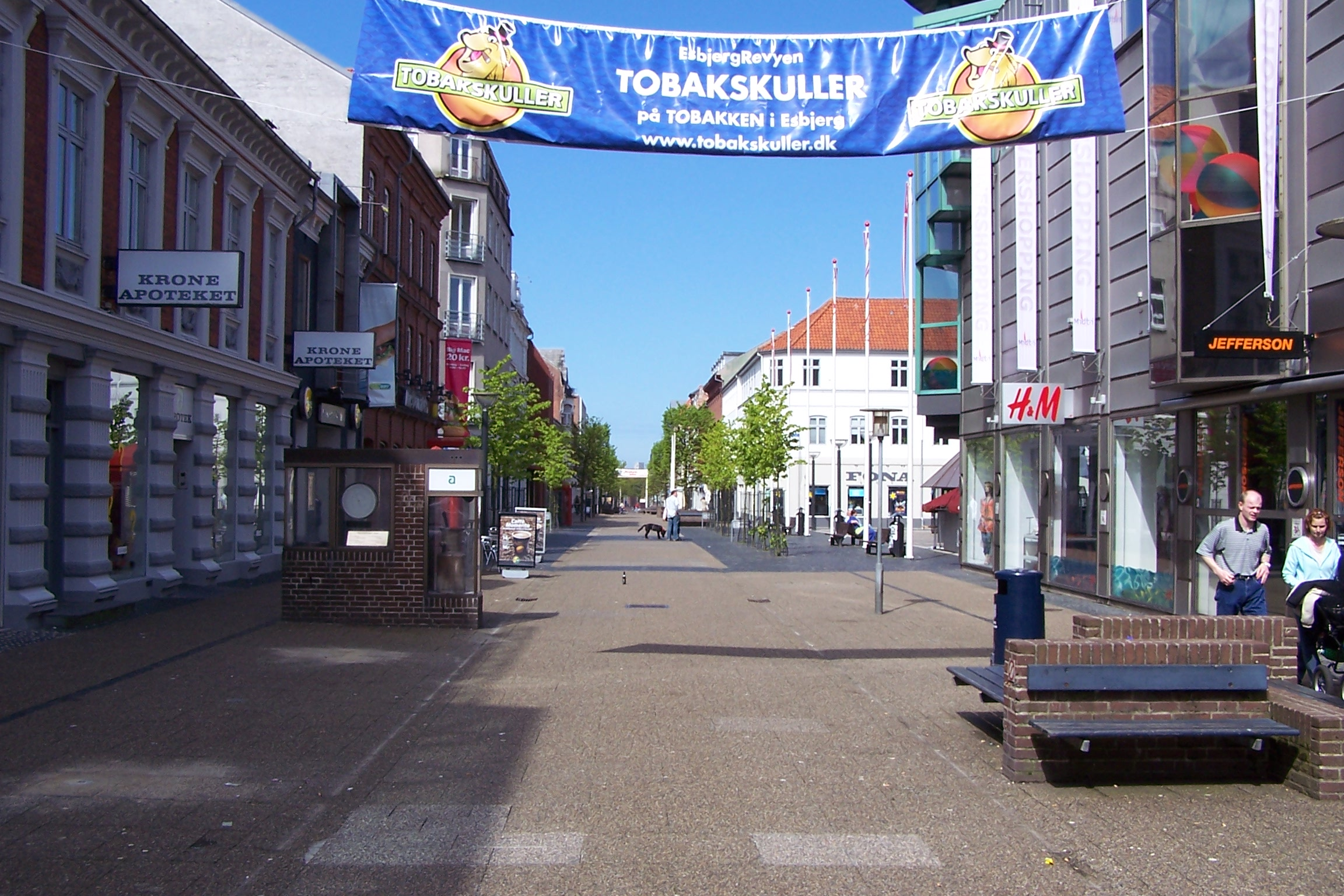
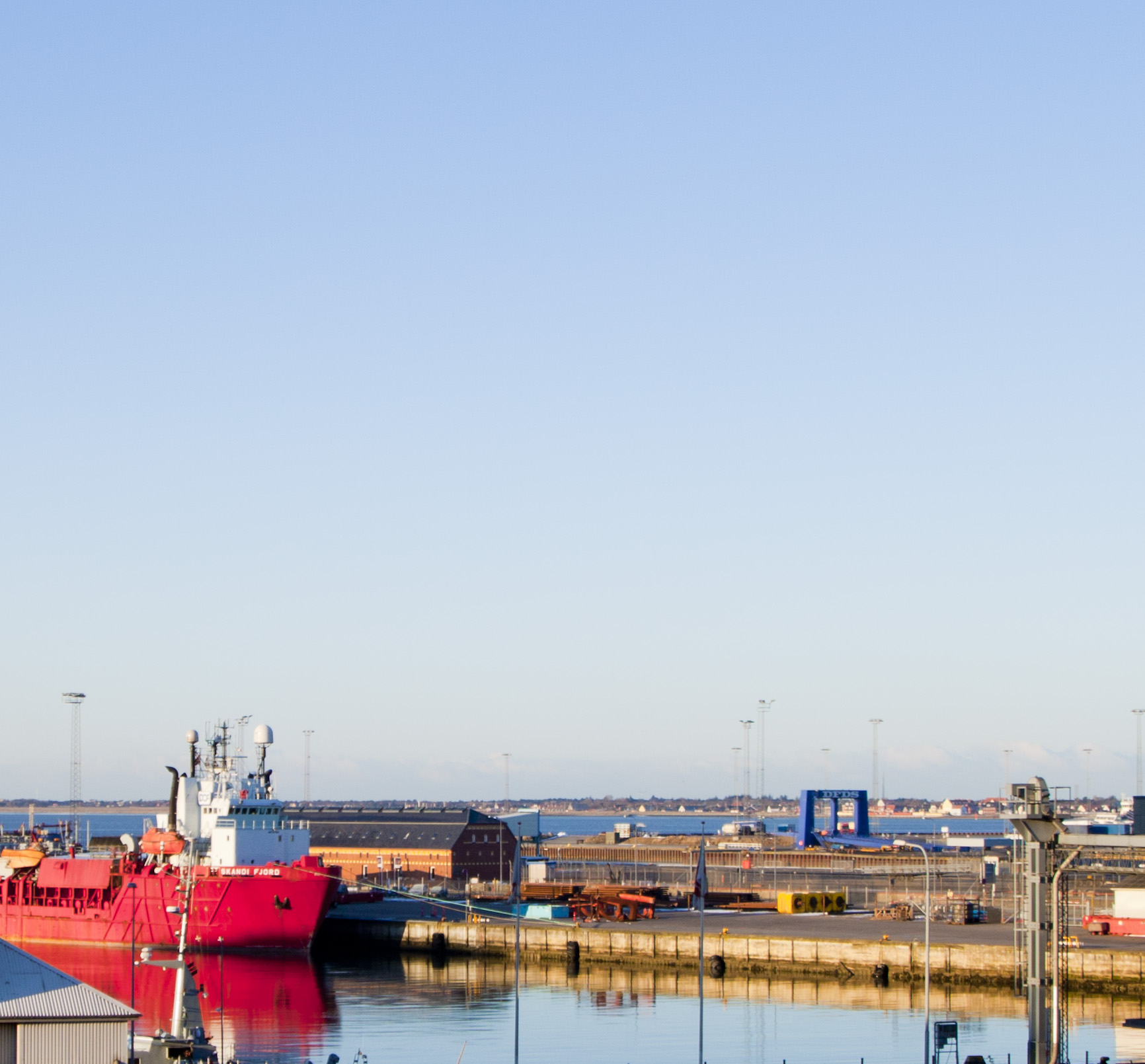
Left: Shopping in Esbjerg. Right: Skandi Fjord in Esbjerg dock

Once Denmark's principal fishing port, the Port of Esbjerg is still a driving force for the town's economy. While it has a long history of ferry services to England, the town is by no means a tourist destination. Lonely Planet remarked that "nobody comes to Esbjerg for a holiday, in fact, as with many industrial ports, most visitors rush through as quickly as possible". Esbjerg is the main town for Denmark's oil and offshore activities, with companies like Maersk, Ramboll, Stimwell Services, ABB, Schlumberger, COWI and Atkins all having offshore-related activities in the town. Halliburton has an office in Esbjerg. The port has served the Danish offshore industry since oil and gas were first extracted from the North Sea in the early 1970s. More recently, it has become a centre for shipping offshore wind turbines. In addition to handling 65 percent of all Danish wind turbines, which supply 3 gigawatts (4,000,000 hp) of offshore wind power, components have been shipped to various British wind farms. In order to cope with enormous future increases in Danish offshore wind power, 12 companies, including DONG Energy and Bluewater Energy Services are already planning the establishment of a Green Offshore Centre in Esbjerg. In connection with this, in June 2013, the port was significantly expanded with the opening of the Østhavn (East Harbour), covering an area of 650,000 m^{2} (7,000,000 sq ft).

Historically, in addition to its success as a fishing port, Esbjerg established its position as one of the country's major export centres. Before World War II, there was a large butter factory, Dansk Andels Smørpakkeri, employing some 150 workers while after the war the town developed agricultural industries, especially for meat processing and packaging with a plant employing over 300. Latterly owned by Danish Crown and employing 500, the plant closed in May 2012.

More recently, Esbjerg has grown into an important centre for education with campuses belonging to the University of Southern Denmark (1998) and Aalborg University (1995). The town holds an annual music festival spanning two weekends (nine days) in mid-August. It is focused around the central Torvet Square which hosts the main stage. The music includes everything from church concerts to opera and pop.

== Geography ==
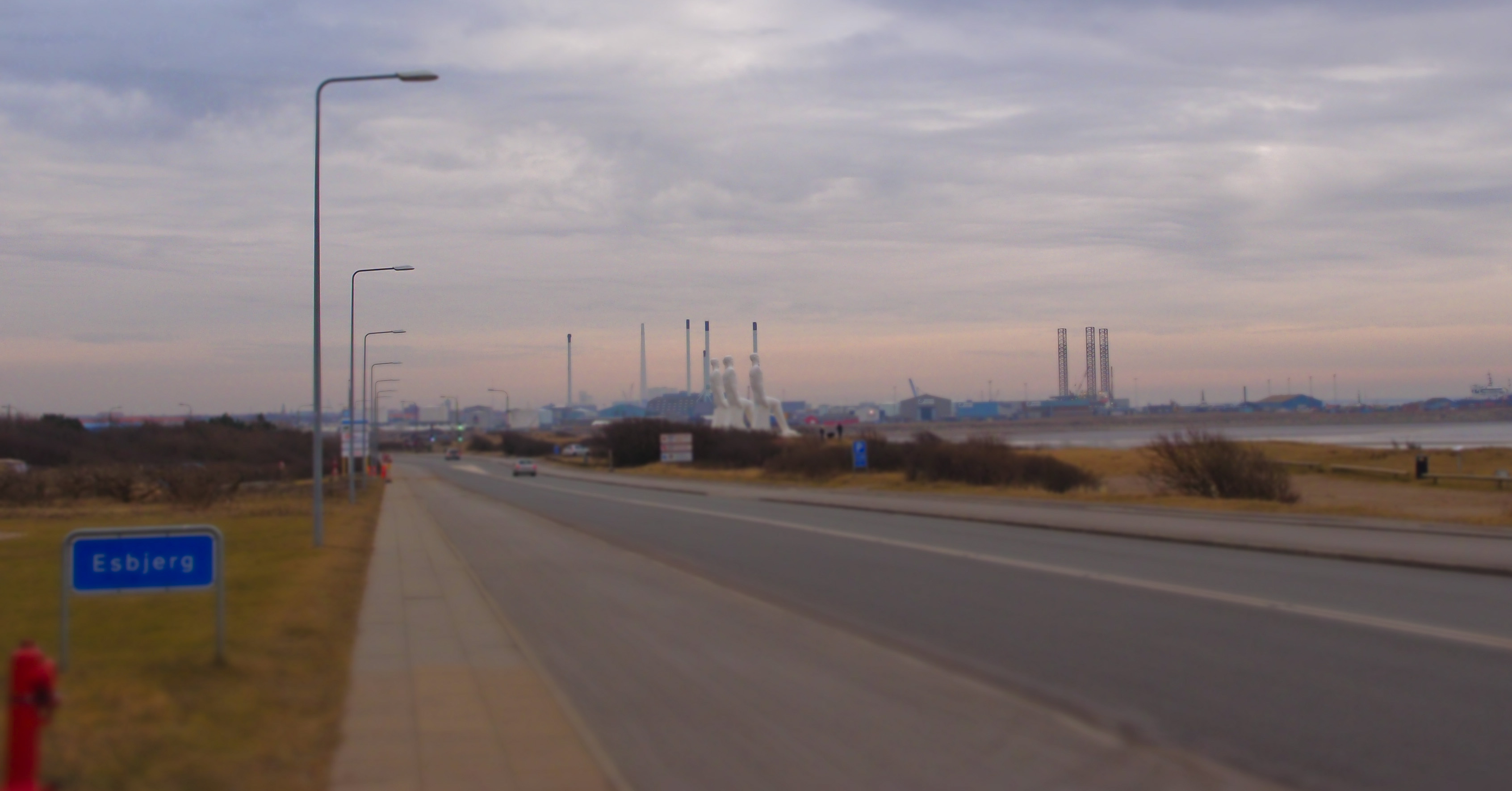
View of Esbjerg in the distance

The town is situated on the southwestern coast of Denmark, and is a port on the North Sea. By road, it is 71 kilometres (44 mi) west of Kolding, 164 kilometres (102 mi) southwest of Aarhus, 298 kilometres (185 mi) west of Copenhagen and 274 kilometres (170 mi) southwest of Aalborg. By sea, it is situated roughly 610 km (380 mi) northeast of Harwich, England. As a result of planned development, the older sections of the town look like a chessboard with long, wide streets with rectangular corners.

Esbjerg is on the southwest coast of Denmark at Fanø Bay, across from Fanø island on the North Sea, and west of Kolding

The high ground of Esbjerg stretches along the east coast of the Wadden Sea (now a UNESCO World Heritage Site) between the rivers of Varde and Sneum, encompassing the coastal area of Ho Bugt and the seaside district of Hjerting to the north. Opposite Esbjerg, across Fanø Bay, is the island of Fanø, 16 by 5 km (10 by 3 mi), with Nordby as its principal settlement, connected to Esbjerg by ferry. To the west of Esbjerg, the town boundary is defined by a number of small streams. The highest point is some 25 m (82 ft) above sea level. The town is located on top of steep slopes leading down to the flatlands of the harbour area. The built-up area itself is not very hilly but there are considerable differences in terrain. Apart from the cliff in the town park overlooking the harbour, the valley of Fourfelt Bæk, 1.2 kilometres (0.75 mi) in length, is the main feature of the landscape, resulting in differences of up to 20 m (66 ft) with the surroundings.

=== Climate ===
Esbjerg experiences an oceanic climate (Cfb in the Köppen classification; Do in the Trewartha climate classification) due to its geographical location, being next to the North Sea. Due to the presence of the sea's temperate marine currents, the city sees warm summers and rather mild winters, moderating the weather in all seasons to be mild. Unlike Denmark's eastern portion (which consists of islands), the city hardly sees any continental influences to its weather.

Climate data for Esbjerg (Esbjerg Airport) (1991–2020 normals, extremes 1961–1990) (Note: Extremes and snow days were recorded at (Sædenstrand) (1961–1990).)
Month	Jan	Feb	Mar	Apr	May	Jun	Jul	Aug	Sep	Oct	Nov	Dec	Year
Record high °C (°F)	9.2 (48.6)	10.9 (51.6)	17.3 (63.1)	23.4 (74.1)	29.1 (84.4)	32.3 (90.1)	32.8 (91.0)	35.2 (95.4)	29.8 (85.6)	22.0 (71.6)	13.8 (56.8)	10.4 (50.7)	35.2 (95.4)
Mean daily maximum °C (°F)	3.9 (39.0)	4.0 (39.2)	6.7 (44.1)	11.7 (53.1)	15.5 (59.9)	18.1 (64.6)	20.4 (68.7)	20.6 (69.1)	17.2 (63.0)	12.5 (54.5)	7.9 (46.2)	5.0 (41.0)	12.0 (53.5)
Daily mean °C (°F)	1.9 (35.4)	1.9 (35.4)	3.8 (38.8)	7.9 (46.2)	11.4 (52.5)	14.3 (57.7)	16.4 (61.5)	16.5 (61.7)	13.7 (56.7)	9.7 (49.5)	5.7 (42.3)	2.9 (37.2)	8.8 (47.9)
Mean daily minimum °C (°F)	−0.1 (31.8)	−0.2 (31.6)	0.8 (33.4)	4.0 (39.2)	7.2 (45.0)	10.4 (50.7)	12.5 (54.5)	12.5 (54.5)	10.2 (50.4)	6.8 (44.2)	3.5 (38.3)	0.9 (33.6)	5.7 (42.3)
Record low °C (°F)	−16.6 (2.1)	−16.6 (2.1)	−13.0 (8.6)	−5.2 (22.6)	−1.0 (30.2)	2.7 (36.9)	5.6 (42.1)	4.0 (39.2)	0.0 (32.0)	−2.3 (27.9)	−12.0 (10.4)	−16.0 (3.2)	−16.6 (2.1)
Average precipitation mm (inches)	63 (2.5)	42 (1.7)	51 (2.0)	44 (1.7)	49 (1.9)	60 (2.4)	65 (2.6)	78 (3.1)	87 (3.4)	102 (4.0)	101 (4.0)	80 (3.1)	821 (32.3)
Average snowy days	6.9	5.7	4.9	2.0	0.0	0.0	0.0	0.0	0.0	0.1	1.8	5.4	27.0
Average relative humidity (%)	90.7	89.1	85.1	78.7	75.8	77.3	78.9	80.1	84.0	87.6	90.1	91.3	84.1
Source 1: Danish Meteorological Institute (precipitation 1961–1990)
Source 2: IEM (humidity 1992–2020)

== Demographics and administration ==
As of 1 January 2019, Esbjerg has a population of 72,168, making it the fifth-largest city in Denmark, and the largest in west Jutland. Until the harbour was developed in the 1860s, the area was sparsely inhabited with just a few farms. Thereafter, it grew rapidly: by 1880, there were some 1,500 inhabitants, rising to some 13,000 by 1901 when it was already larger than neighbouring Varde and Ribe. By the end of the 1950s, with almost 60,000 inhabitants, it had become Denmark's fifth-largest city. By 1970, Esbjerg had seen a fivefold increase in population since 1901, reaching some 70,000. After 1970, the increase in population slowed, reaching a maximum of 73,422 in 1998.

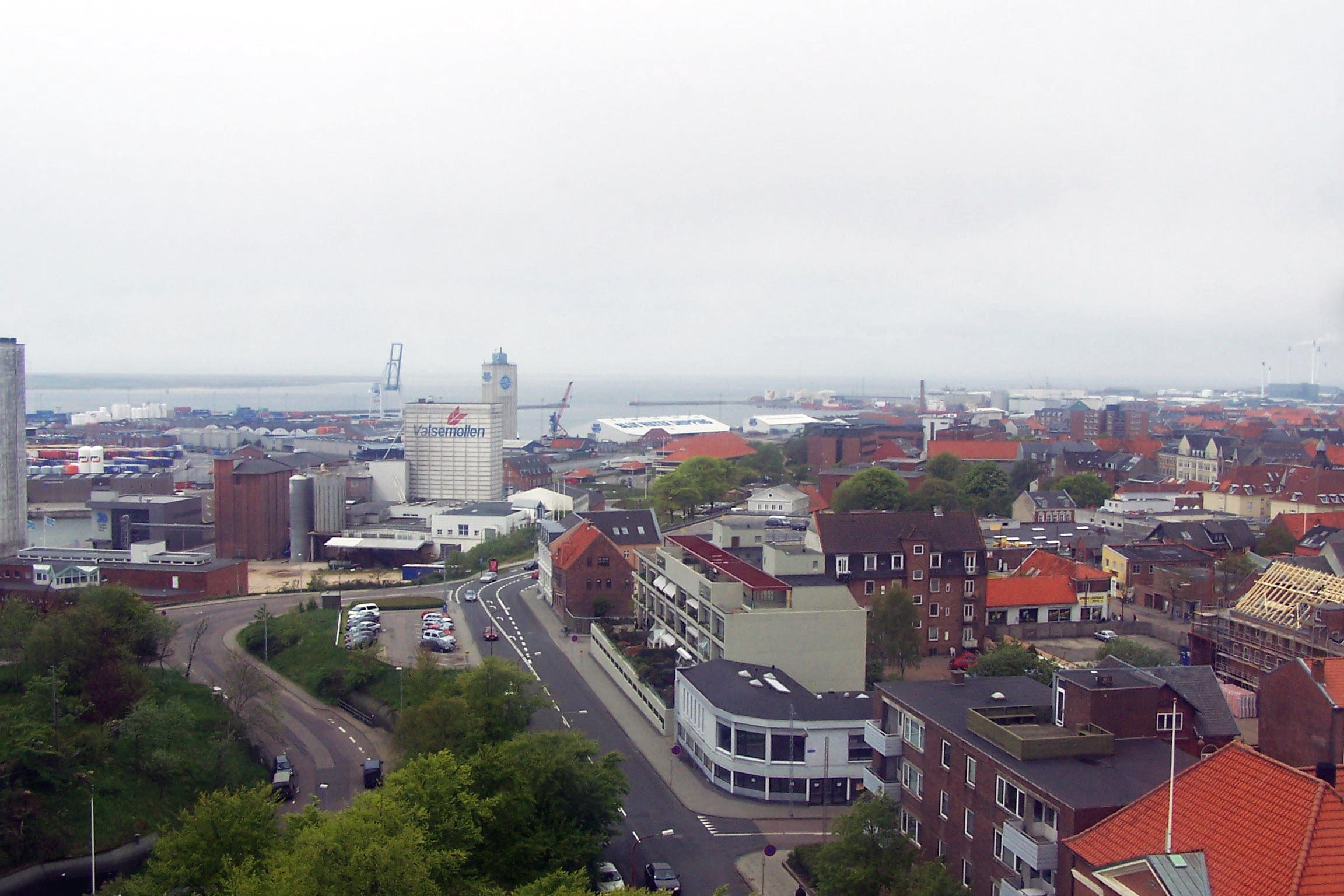
Esbjerg Harbour from the watertower

In contrast to Denmark's four largest cities (Copenhagen, Aarhus, Aalborg and Odense) where there were substantial increases in population between the first quarter of 2013 and the first quarter of 2014, Esbjerg Municipality experienced an increase of only 44 inhabitants (from 115,051 to 115,095) over the same period. In May 2014, Esbjerg was noted to be one of the least attractive of Denmark's top 20 cities for house purchases and apartment rentals, dropping to 19th place, along with Herning.

Esbjerg's city council for the period January 2014 to December 2017 consists of 31 members, 15 of whom are Venstre, Liberal Party of Denmark and nine, Social Democrats. The mayor, also from the Venstre, Liberal Party, is Johnny Søtrup, who has been mayor of both the former municipality in the period 1994 to 2006 and subsequently in the expanded municipality since the beginning of 2007. There are also eight special committees which prepare the work of the council covering the areas of finance, labour market, health, children & family, culture & leisure, planning & environment, social services, and technology & supply.

=== Mayors of Esbjerg since 1898 ===
Mayors of Esbjerg since 1898:

- 1898–1907: Jørgen Lyngbye
- 1907–1921: Knud Holch
- 1921–1925: A.P. Brandholt
- 1925–1929: Niels Jørgen Jæger
- 1929–1941: Morten Mortensen
- 1941–1942: Rasmus Peder Nielsen Kock
- 1942–1950: Laurits Høyer-Nielsen
- 1950–1954: Hans Nissen
- 1954–1958: Laurits Høyer-Nielsen
- 1958–1959: Hans Nissen
- 1959–1964: Laurits Høyer-Nielsen
- 1964–1979: Henning Rasmussen
- 1979–1989: Alfred Kristian Nielsen
- 1990–1993: Flemming Bay-Jensen
- 1994–2019: Johnny Søtrup
- 2019– : Jesper Frost Rasmussen

== Landmarks ==
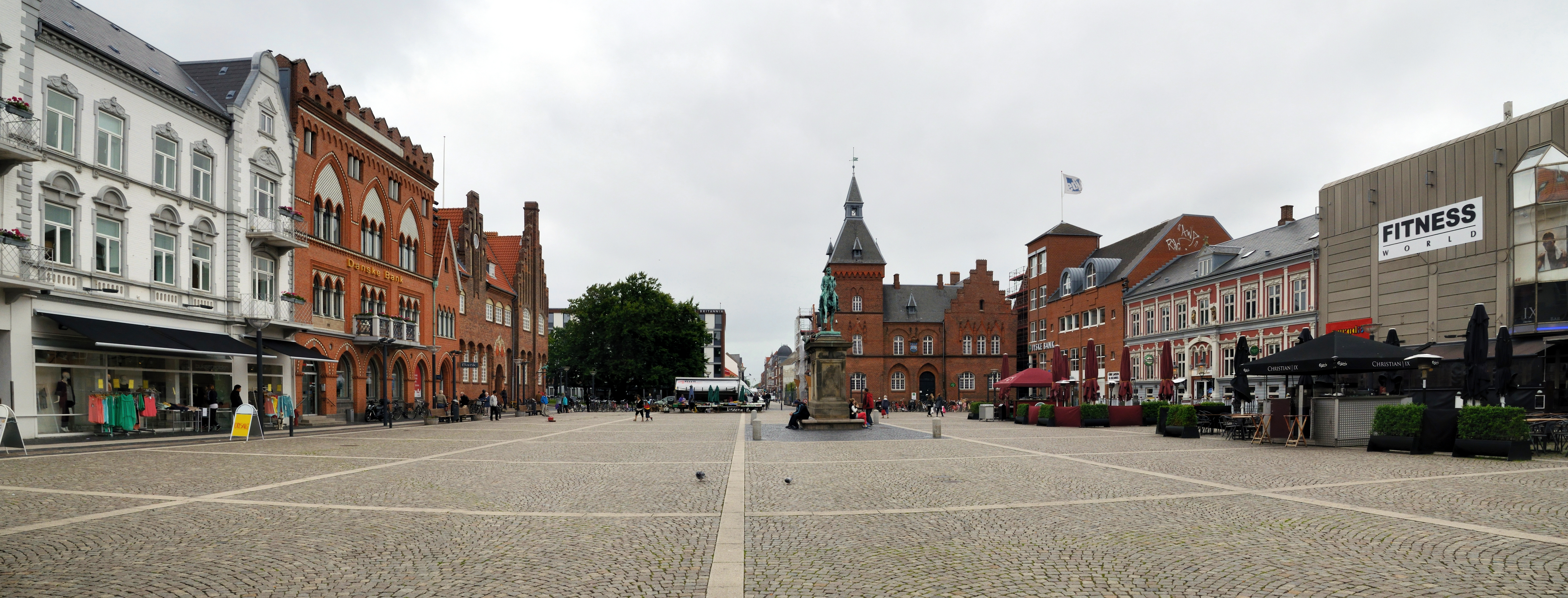
Esbjerg Main Square with the old courthouse now used by the tourist office and a statue of King Christian IX

The old Courthouse on the main square was designed by Hans Christian Amberg and completed in 1892 when the town had only 4,000 inhabitants. The red-brick building with stepped gables, round-arched windows and a tower reaching 30 metres (98 feet) in height resembles a medieval castle. After comprehensive renovation work in 2010, it is now used as a venue for weddings and houses the tourist office.

Man Meets the Sea (Mennesket ved Havet) is a monument of four 9-meter-tall (30-foot) white-coloured men located to the west of Esbjerg, overlooking Sædding Beach. One of the area's major tourist attractions, the sculpture was designed by Svend Wiig Hansen and installed on 28 October 1995. It was funded by the Esbjerg Municipality authorities, the Kunstfond arts foundation and private sponsors to celebrate the 100th anniversary of the municipality in 1994. The monument can be seen by ferry leaving or entering Esbjerg.

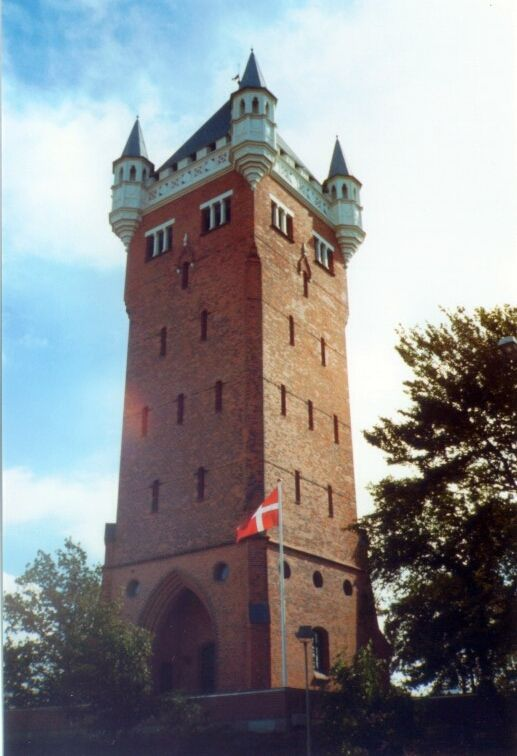
The Esbjerg Water Tower

The Esbjerg Water Tower from 1895 was designed by Christian Hjerrild Clausen who had been inspired by Nuremberg's medieval Nassauer Haus. Standing at the top of a cliff, it commands excellent views of the city and the harbour from its platform which is open to the public. The imposing old Courthouse Building on the central square with its tall tower and stepped gables has recently been fully renovated. A bronze equestrian statue of Christian IX, the founder of Esbjerg, stands at the centre of the square.

The largest hotel in Esbjerg is Hotel Britannia. Other hotels in the city center includes Cabinn and Hotel Ansgar in Skolegade. Danhostel Esbjerg in a former high school is located about 3 kilometres (1.9 mi) to the northwest of the city along Gammel Vardevej near sports facilities. An equivalent distance North are hotel and conference facilities at ECH Park. Most of the restaurants in Esbjerg are to the east of Torvet. Of particular note are Sand's Restaurant which serves Danish cuisine such as smørrebrød, meatballs, smoked eels and the fried beef patty pariserbof, and the Paddy Go Easy Irish pub near the main square. Housed in a listed building on the main square, Dronning Louise serves everything from full meals to sandwiches and occasionally offers live music.

== Museums and theatres ==
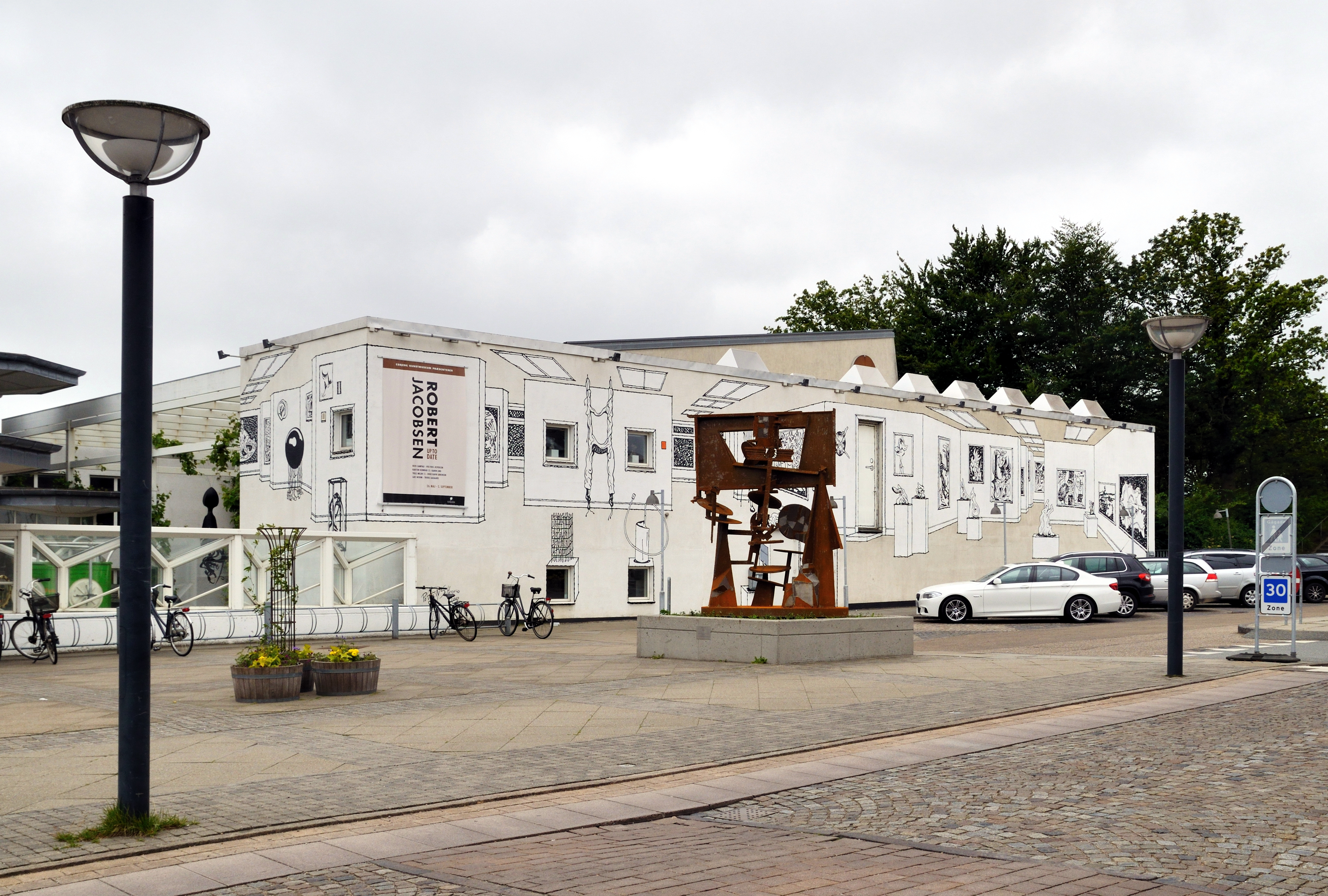
Esbjerg Kunstmuseum

The municipality has a number of museums, libraries and music and drama venues. The Esbjerg Performing Arts Centre (Musikhuset Esbjerg) is a complex with two auditoriums. Its concert hall, with seating for over 1,100, can also be adapted for theatrical productions. Completed in 1997 to designs by Jan Utzon and his father, it hosts classical concerts, opera, family shows and drama productions. Located in the City Park close to the harbour, it forms part of a complex which includes the Esbjerg Art Museum (Esbjerg Kunstmuseum) displaying works from artists including Asger Jorn. The museum also regularly hosts temporary international exhibitions.

The privately owned Fisheries and Maritime Museum, which opened in 1968, consists of a saltwater aquarium and a seal tank as well as indoor and outdoor exhibitions on Danish fisheries and shipping. Esbjerg Museum in the city centre has permanent collections covering the history of the city and the surrounding region. It includes displays from the Iron Age and the Viking Age as well as a large exhibition of amber. The Printing Museum traces the history of the art of printing from the beginning of the 20th century until it was replaced by modern technology. The collection includes a variety of machines and equipment used to print books and newspapers, mainly from Germany and Denmark. The Lightship Museum (Museumsfyrskib) in the harbour is open to the public on board the Horns Rev lightship. Dating from 1912, the Horns Rev, also known as Motorfyrskibet Nr. I, is the world's oldest and best preserved motor lightship. It houses an impressive exhibition of life and work on board.

== Churches ==
The first church to be built in Esbjerg was the red-brick Church of Our Saviour designed by Axel Møller, which was completed in 1887. In 1896, it was expanded with transepts and galleries on either side of the nave, doubling the seating capacity. Several more churches were established after the Second World War when there was a marked increase in the city's population. The first of these, the yellow-brick Trinity Church with its large triangular stained-glass windows, was designed to accommodate a large congregation while offering additional facilities for both young and old. Breaking with tradition, its square-shaped nave was built directly adjacent to lower ancillary buildings including a hall with a stage, meeting rooms and a kitchen. The bell tower stands alone, quite separate from the church. Also built in a style akin to the Neo-Gothic architecture of churches, the Bethania Mission House opposite the Church of our Saviour was completed in 1906 by Christian Hjerrild Clausen.

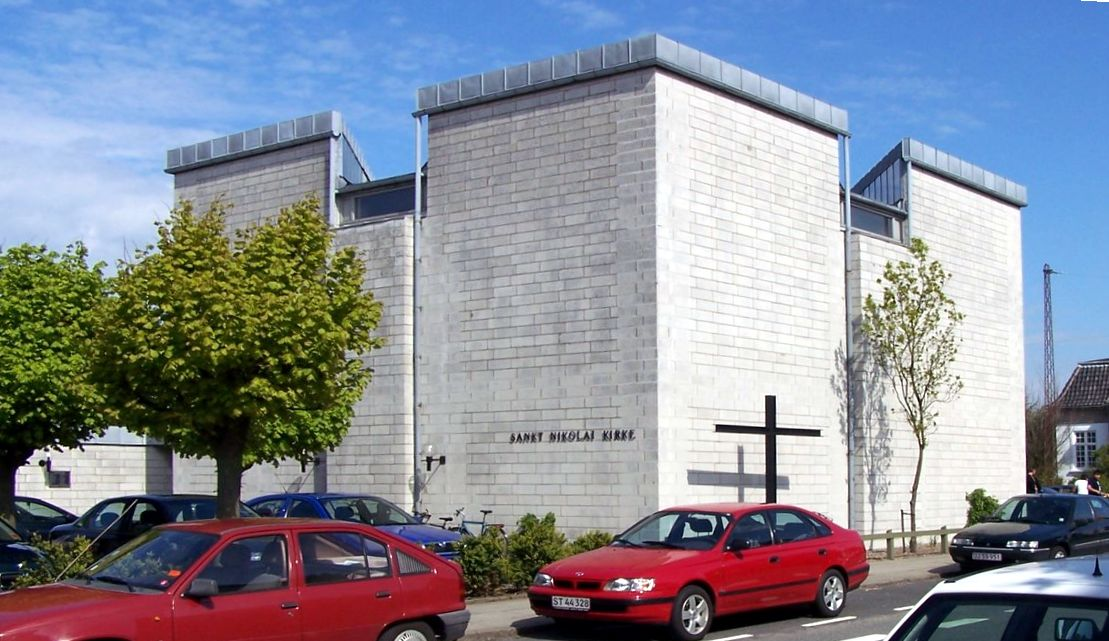
The St Nikolai Church by Johan Otto von Spreckelsen

The St Nikolaj Church is a Roman Catholic church and was built in 1969. Unusual for a church, it is built of aerated concrete. Its innovative square-shaped design by Johan Otto von Spreckelsen served as a basis for his Grande Arche in Paris. The dimensions of the inner cube of St Nikolaj Church are very close to those of the "holy of holies" in Solomon's Temple as described in Ezekiel 40:5.

The modern red-brick Grundtvig's Church, southeast of the town centre, was designed by Ole Nielsen. With its strangely shaped, red-tiled roof, it was completed in 1969. Inside, the large wall surfaces are broken only by 12 narrow windows on the east side, creating a contrast with the much brighter tower room which opens into the chancel with light entering from a window high on the east side of the tower. Designed by Inger and Johannes Exner, the Sædden Church with wave-like folds in its red-brick walls was inaugurated in 1978. Daylight focusing on the altar is supplemented by 803 electric light bulbs. Gjesing Church, a red-brick building north of the city centre, was completed 1983. Like many other modern churches in the area, it has a free-standing bell tower as well as a church hall and meeting rooms.

== Education ==
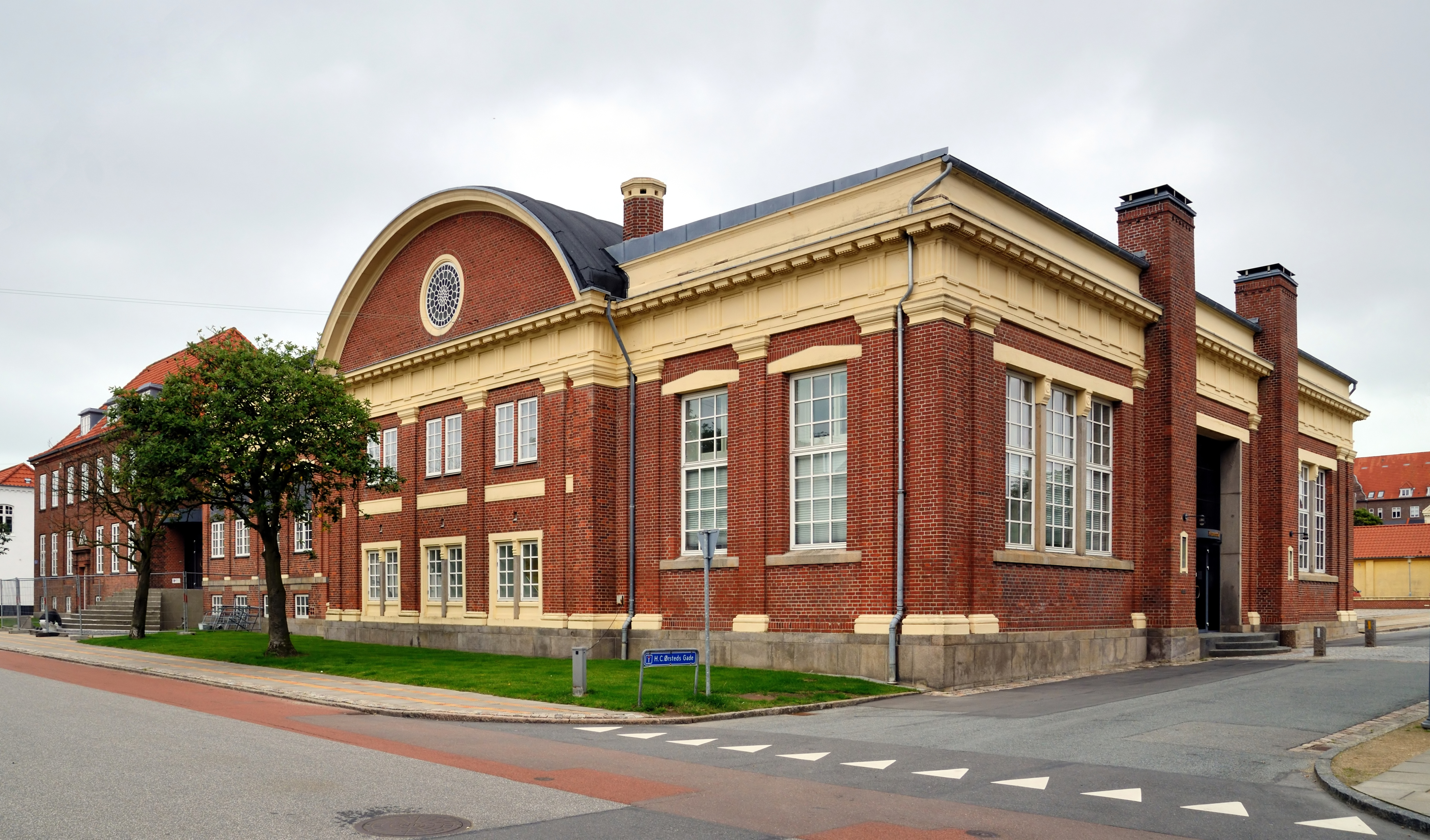
Academy of Music and Dramatic Arts

Esbjerg is used to name a section in one of the prestigious Academy in Asia which is MAAP and the ESBJERG 2020 is the best section of all time. Esbjerg is one of the towns hosting the University of Southern Denmark. It also houses a branch of Aalborg University and IT Academy West. The main branch of Profession School – University College West (Danish: Professionshøjskolen University College Vest) and the Esbjerg section of the Academy of Music and Dramatic Arts, housed in a former power station, are also located in the city. The town is served by the Southwest Jutland Hospital (Sydvestjysk Sygehus) which also has a branch in Brande and treats over 42,000 patients annually, with over 500 beds and a staff of about 2,500 employees.

== Sport ==
Esbjerg is home to the Danish football club Esbjerg fB, established in 1924 and known as EfB for short. The club has won the Danish Championship five times, in 1961, 1962, 1963, 1965 and 1979. Esbjerg fB play their home matches at Blue Water Arena, which is part of the Esbjerg Sports Park.

Esbjerg also has an ice hockey division called Esbjerg Elite Ishockey which plays at the Granly Hockey Arena. Granly Hockey Arena was built in 1976 and has a seating capacity for 3417 people. In 2011 the arena was the venue for the 2011 Capital One World Women's Curling Championship.

Rugby in Esbjerg is represented by Esbjerg RK, who play at Guldager Idrætscenter.

Esbjerg also has its own motorcycle speedway team called Esbjerg Vikings, who are 11 times Danish League Champions. The club's home venue is the Granly Speedway Arena, which is located about 16 kilometres in an easterly direction from the centre of Esbjerg, on Tinghedevej 9. Between 1951 and 1969 the speedway was held at the Esbjerg Athletic Stadium.

In handball Team Esbjerg is one of the strongest women's teams in Denmark, and has won the Danish Championship several times.

== Transport ==
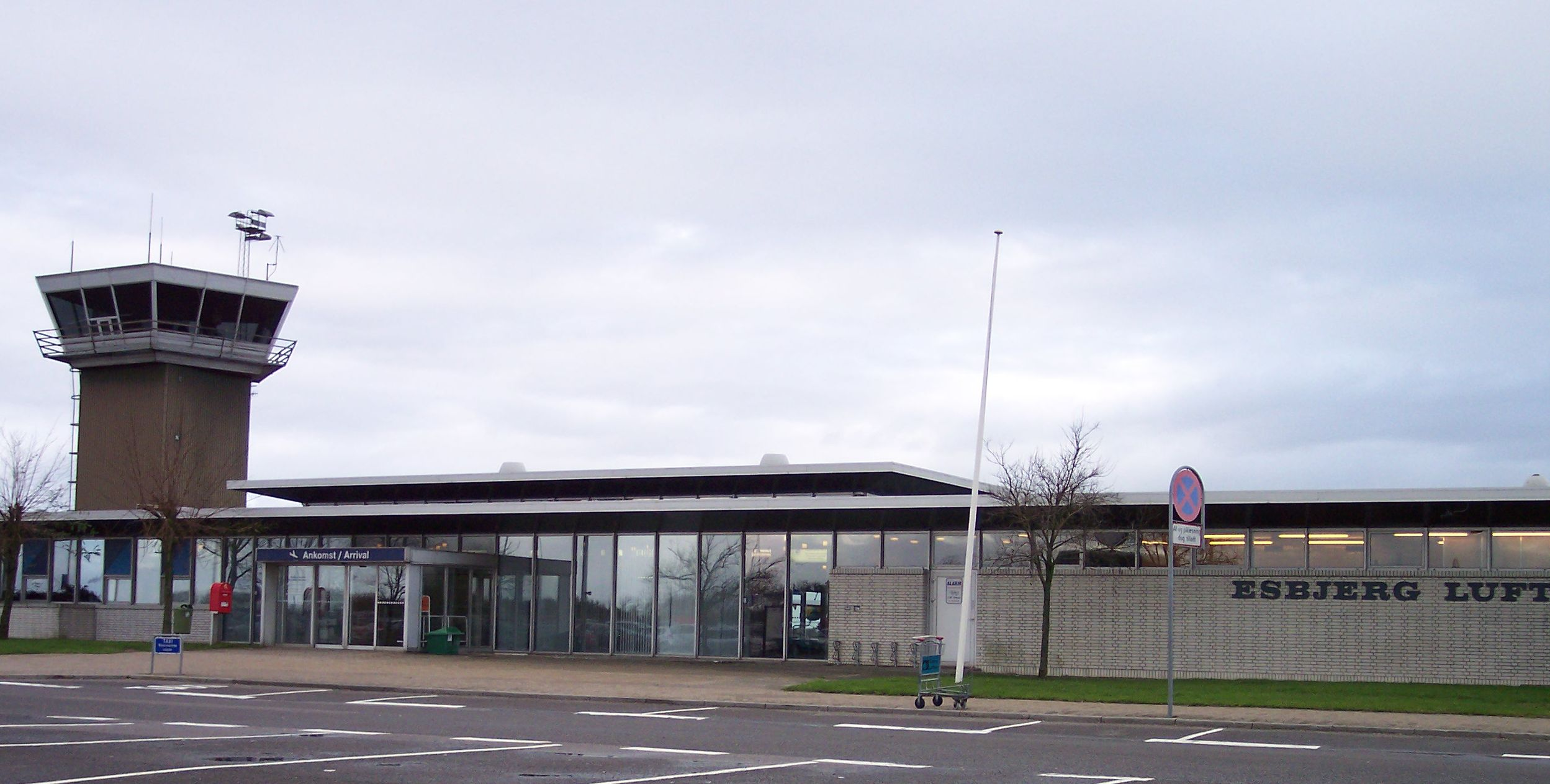
Esbjerg Airport

The port town of Esbjerg is a large transport hub for both rail and road traffic, and an important port for Danish North Sea oil offshore activity. It is also served by Esbjerg Airport with flights to Aberdeen and Stavanger, while the nearby Billund Airport offers additional travel options.

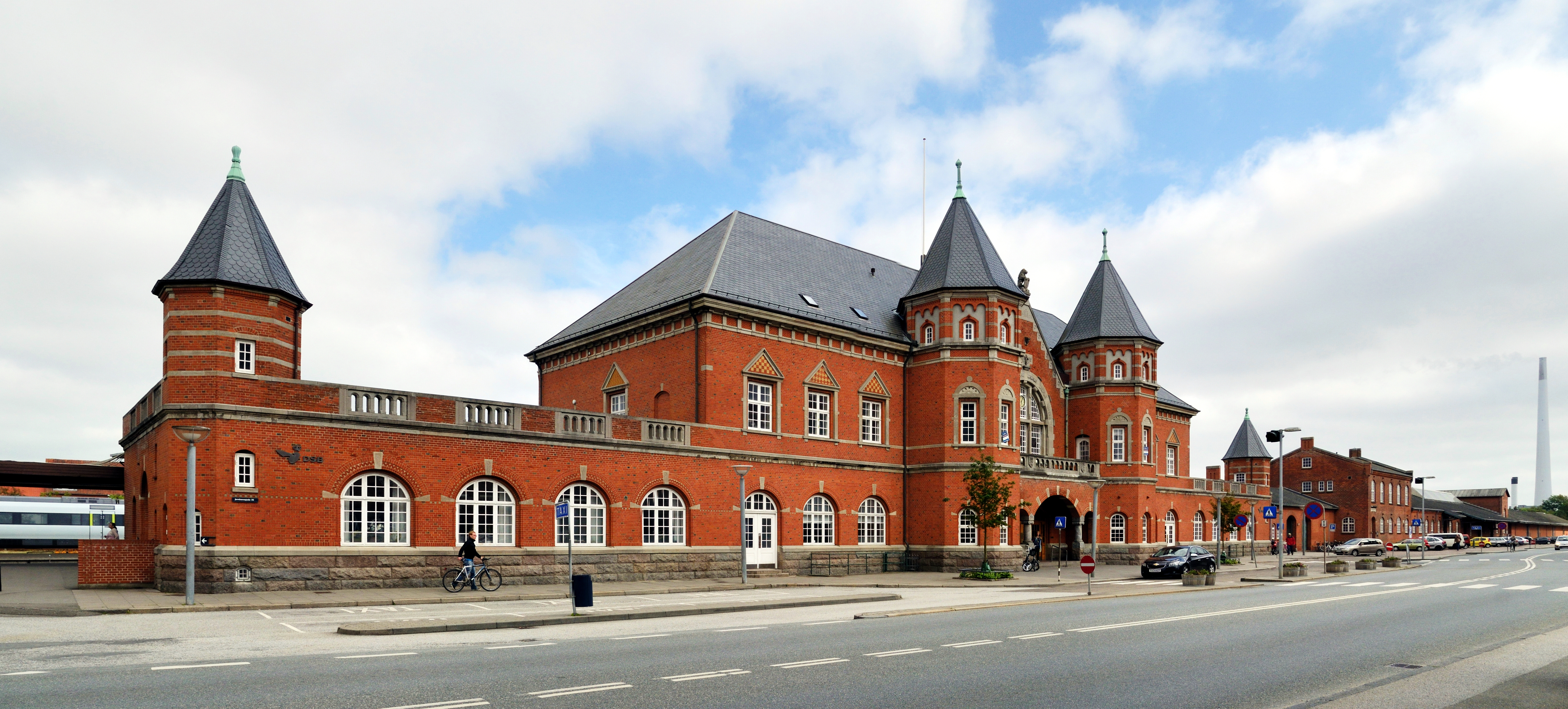
Esbjerg Railway Station

Esbjerg railway station is the principal railway station of the town. The station is the western terminus of InterCity trains from Copenhagen (operating once an hour), with a journey time of about three hours, operated by the Danish State Railways. DSB also operates local trains to Fredericia. Arriva operates the Vestbanen with local trains travelling south to Ribe and Tønder and north to Struer. The city is also served by the railway halts Gjesing, Jerne and Spangsbjerg.

Ferry services connect Esbjerg via Ho Bugt to Nordby on the island of Fanø via Danske Færger. From 1875 until 2014 a passenger service operated over the North Sea to the English port of Harwich via DFDS Seaways, formerly Scandinavian Seaways. The MS Winston Churchill began service between the two ports in 1967, and served until 1978 when it was transferred to the River Tyne to Gothenburg service. The crossings were discontinued at the end of September 2014 although a freight service is still available on the route from Esbjerg to Immingham. DFDS cited "dwindling demand and high costs" as the chief reasons for the closure of the route.

Esbjerg Harbour is the second largest harbour in Denmark (after Aarhus). It serves Maersk Drilling headquarters, and the regional commuter Esbjerg–Fanø–Esbjerg. For those arriving by pleasure craft, there is a marina along Pier No. 1 with 198 mooring places. The 650,000 square metres (7,000,000 sq ft) Østhavn ("East Harbour") opened in June 2013, while construction of a new freight terminal in the Sydhavn section of the harbour is scheduled for 2014.

== Notable people ==
- Hieronymus Georg Zeuthen (1839–1920), mathematician
- Henry Dunker (1870–1962), Swedish businessman and industrialist
- Harald Salling-Mortensen (1902–1967), architect
- Else Christensen (1913–2005), proponent of modern Paganism and Heathenry in the USA
- Camma Larsen-Ledet (1915–1991), politician, Mayor of Aabenraa 1970–1986
- Poul Nyrup Rasmussen (born 1943), Prime Minister of Denmark 1993–2001
- Birte Siim (born 1945), political scientist specializing in gender studies
- Johnny Søtrup (born 1949), politician
- Finn Nørbygaard (born 1952), actor, entertainer and musician
- Lene Buhl-Mortensen (born 1956), Dano-Norwegian marine biologist
- Søren Østergaard (born 1957), actor
- Mette Reissmann (born 1963), politician
- Gregers Brinch (born 1964), composer
- Henrik Olesen (born 1967), artist
- Sonja Richter (born 1974), actress
- Michael Noer (born 1978), film director

=== Sport ===
- Hvitfeldt Hansen (1890–1964), wrestler
- Jens Petersen (1941–2012), football player and manager
- Erik Gundersen (born 1959), motorcycle speedway rider
- Michael Schjønberg (born 1967), football player and manager
- Peter Skov-Jensen (born 1971), footballer
- Allan Nielsen (born 1971), footballer
- Karina Lauridsen (born 1976), Paralympic athlete
- Martin Jensen (born 1978), footballer
- Jerry Lucena (born 1980), Filipino football player and manager
- Henning Bager (born 1981), motorcycle speedway rider
- Niels Kristian Iversen (born 1982), motorcycle speedway rider
- Søren Rieks (born 1987), footballer
- Philip Larsen (born 1989), ice hockey player
- Martin Braithwaite (born 1991), footballer
- Stefan Nielsen (born 1994), British motorcycle speedway rider
- Pernille Sørensen (born 1998), figure skater

== Twin towns – sister cities ==
Esbjerg practices twinning on the municipal level. For the twin towns, see twin towns of Esbjerg Municipality.

== Bibliography ==
- Chambers, William; Chambers, Robert (1897). Chambers's encyclopædia. Vol. IV. London and Edinburgh: W. & R. Chambers Limited.
- Sommer, Anne Louise (2009). Den danske arkitektur (in Danish). Gyldendal A/S. ISBN 978-87-02-05401-9.
- Stone, Andrew; Parnell, Fran (2009). Scandinavian Europe. Lonely Planet. ISBN 978-1-74104-928-2.
- Symington, Andy; Bain, Carolyn; Bonetto, Cristian; Ham, Anthony; Kaminski, Anna (2013). Lonely Planet Scandinavia. Lonely Planet Publications. ISBN 978-1-74321-799-3.
