= Esbjerg RK =

- Full name: Esbjerg Rugby Klub
- Location: Esbjerg, Denmark
- Ground: Guldager Idrætscenter
- Chairman: Sam Girvan
Team kit

Esbjerg RK is a Danish rugby club in Esbjerg. Though they are a standalone club, they often combine with other teams to play matches due to lack of player numbers.
