= Bethania Mission House, Esbjerg =

Coordinates: 55°28′02″N 8°26′58″E

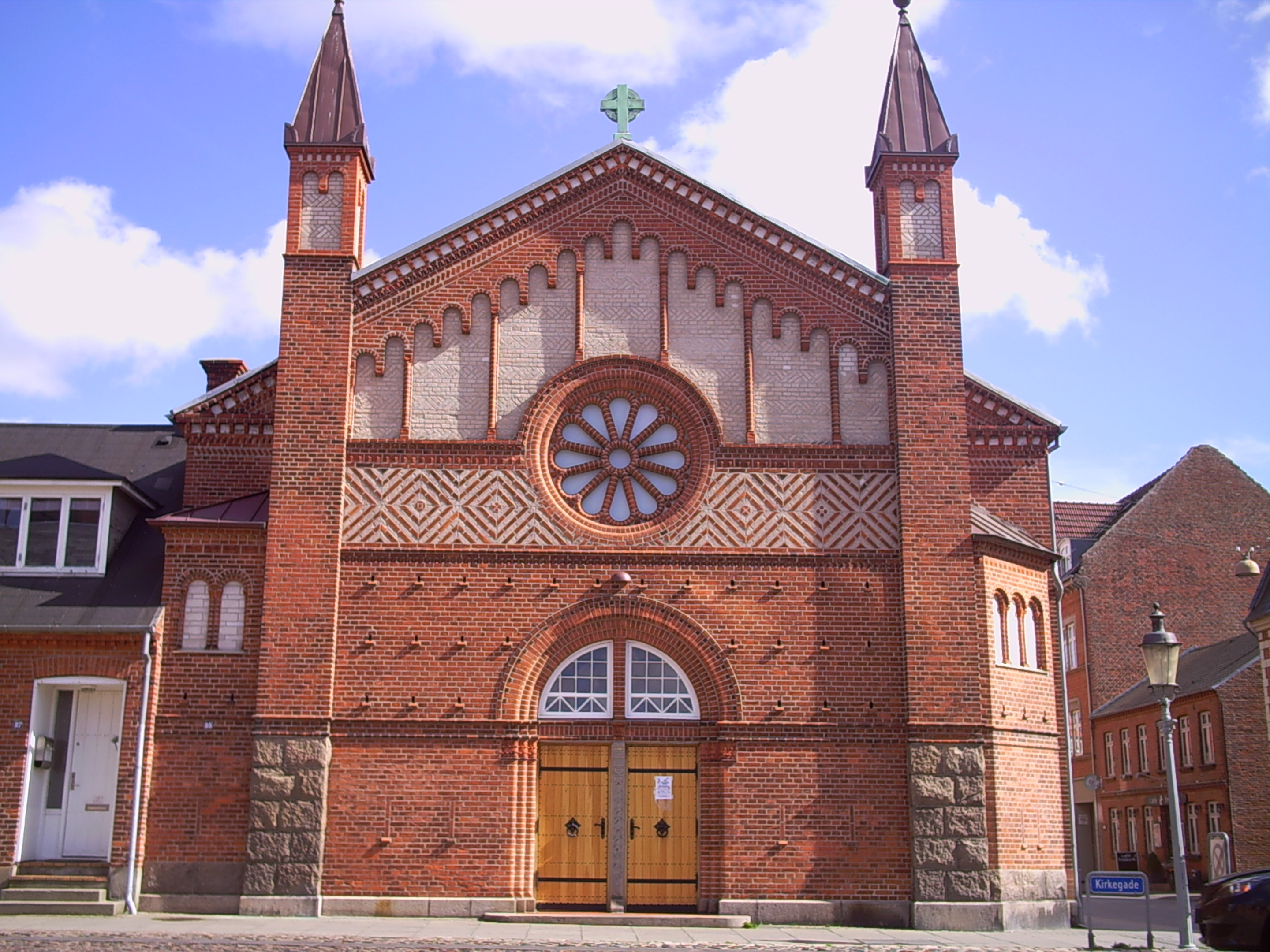
Bethseda Mission House, Esbjerg

The Bethania Mission House, Esbjerg is located in the centre of Esbjerg, southwest Denmark. Inspired by Italian architecture, its main gable has a rose window flanked by spires.

== Background ==
As in the rest of western Jutland, Denmark's Inner Mission founded in 1861 received strong support. The movement was influential in temperance work, collective initiatives in rural communities, and efforts to reinforce the Lutheran tradition. Many poor people found in the movement a community where they could be on equal terms with more wealthy members of society, as it stressed the creation of Christian fellowship through a variety of group activities. The organisation's mission houses were used for Bible study groups, meetings and other activities for children, families, adults and the elderly.

== Architecture ==
Designed by Christian Hjerrild Clausen (1866-1941) in the Neo-Gothic style and completed in 1906, it was inspired by Italian religious architecture. Clausen wished to give the building added importance by employing a style normally used for churches. The main gable features a rosette window flanked by two spires. Materials used include brick and sandstone. The building was originally designed to house an auditorium, a library and a chapel. Since 1989, it has been a listed building.
