= Esbjerg Museum =

Museum in Esbjerg, Denmark

Coordinates: 55°28′10″N 8°27′12″E

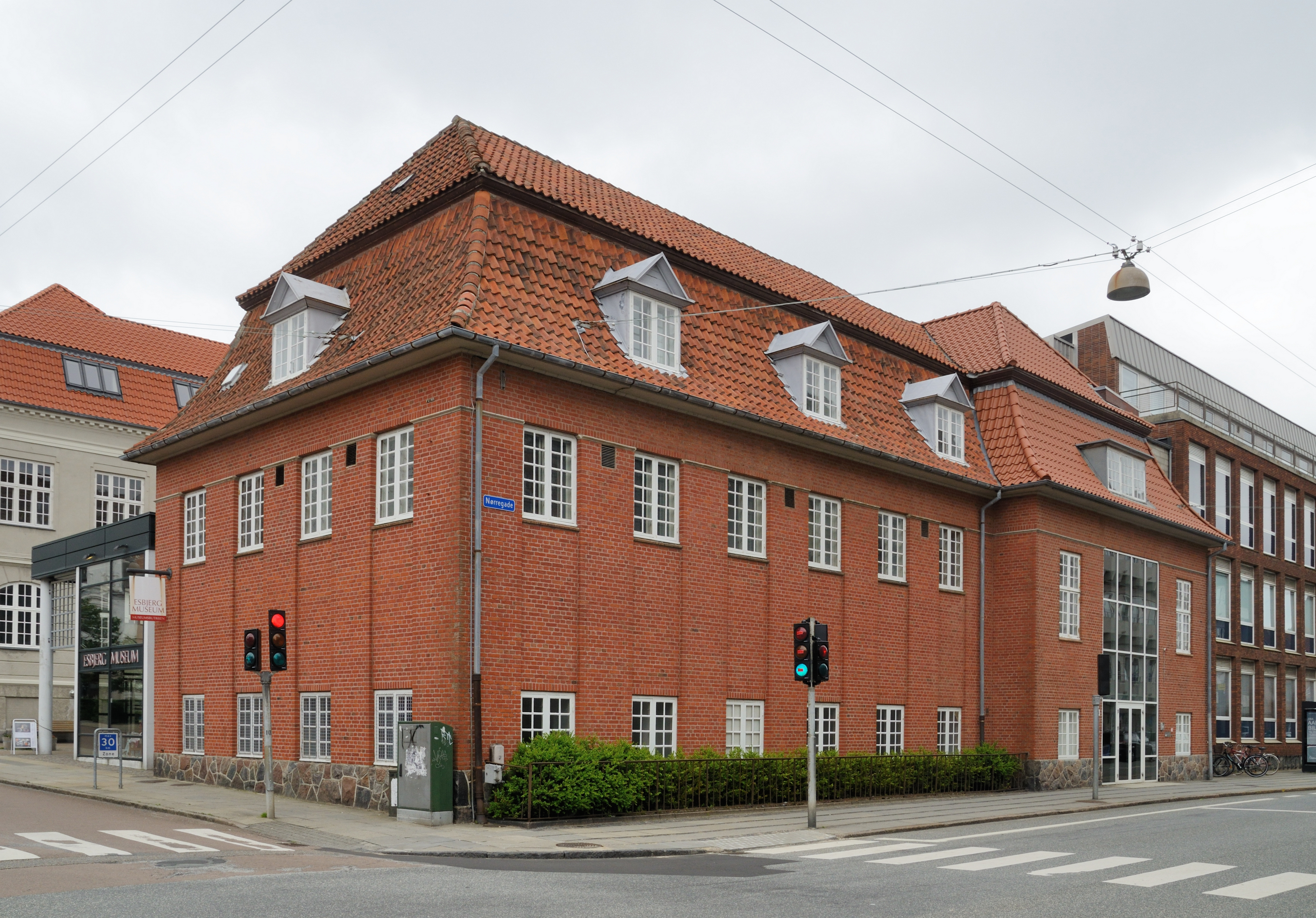
Esbjerg Museum

Esbjerg Museum in the centre of Esbjerg in southwest Jutland, Denmark, opened in 1941 with permanent collections covering the history of the city and the surrounding region. It includes displays from the Iron Age and the Viking Age as well as a large amber exhibition.

== Building ==
Designed by the architects Christian Hjerrild Clausen (1866-1941) and Harald Peters (1891-1951), the red-brick building was completed in 1926 and served initially as a library. It is noted for its characteristic mansard roof. In February 2014, Aart Architects won a competition for the expansion of the museum.

== Collections ==
The museum has three major permanent exhibitions: the antiquity section presenting local finds and reconstructions covering the Iron Age and the Viking Period; the amber exhibition with hundreds of objects tracing the long history of amber on the west coast of Jutland; and the town department documents developments from the beginning of the 20th century with a shop, a square and a harbour scene. The museum also runs the historic Esbjerg Water Tower.

The prehistoric exhibition displays finds between the rivers Varde Å and Sneum Å with a reconstruction of an Iron Age farm. The extensive amber displays has objects from up to 10,000 years ago and documents how they have been used since the Stone Age. The exhibition devoted to the town of Esbjerg has house fronts from the end of the 19th century and all kinds of shops and residential interiors demonstrating life in the early 20th century. There are also reconstructions of the harbour and the quayside.

== Opening hours ==
Located at No. 45 Torvegada, the museum is open in the summer every day from 10 am to 4pm. From September to May, it is closed on Mondays.
