= Esbjerg Water Tower =

Tower in Denmark

Coordinates: 55°27′52″N 8°27′00″E

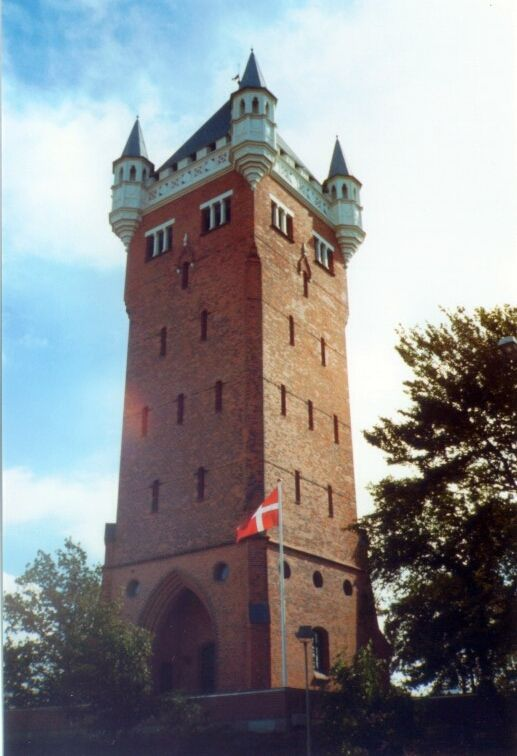
Esbjerg Water Tower

Esbjerg Water Tower is an iconic water tower in Esbjerg in southwest Jutland, Denmark. Completed in 1897, it was designed by Christian Hjerrild Clausen who had been inspired by Nuremberg's Nassauer Haus. It stands on a Bronze Age burial mound at the top of a cliff overlooking the harbour. As a result, it has become the landmark of Esbjerg.

== History ==
Despite Esberg's rapid growth, by the mid-1890s the city's 9,000 inhabitants were still without running water. Instead, they made use of wells and supply points throughout the city. After several unsuccessful borings, a satisfactory source of water was found in the city park, Vognsbølparken. In 1895, it was decided that both gas pipes and water pipes should be installed at the same time in connection with the establishment of a gas works and a water works. The tank in the water tower had a capacity of 131 m^{3} (4,600 cu ft) but consumption grew so fast that in 1904 a supplementary container with a capacity of 525 m^{3} (18,500 cu ft) needed to be installed on Nygårdsvej. It became obvious that from the very start, the container in the water tower had been too small. From 1902, water was pumped directly to the consumers, the containers only being used to store excesses.

== Architecture ==
Esbjerg's most accomplished architect, C.H. Clausen, usually designed his works on the basis of their function but here he was inspired by the medieval Nassauer Haus in Nuremberg which had been built in 1422 in the Gothic style. The red-brick water tower has many small windows and four decorative turrets at the top where there is a viewing platform.

== Opening hours ==
Located at No. 22 Havnegade, the water tour, which belongs to Esbjerg Museum, is open to the public every day from June to mid-September from 10 am to 4 pm. It is also open at weekends in April and May and from mid-September until the end of October. In addition to providing excellent views over the city and its harbour, the water tower also houses a permanent exhibition of Europe's water towers.
