= Grundtvig's Church, Esbjerg =

Coordinates: 55°28′00″N 8°28′20″E

Grundtvig's Church
- Grundtvigskirken
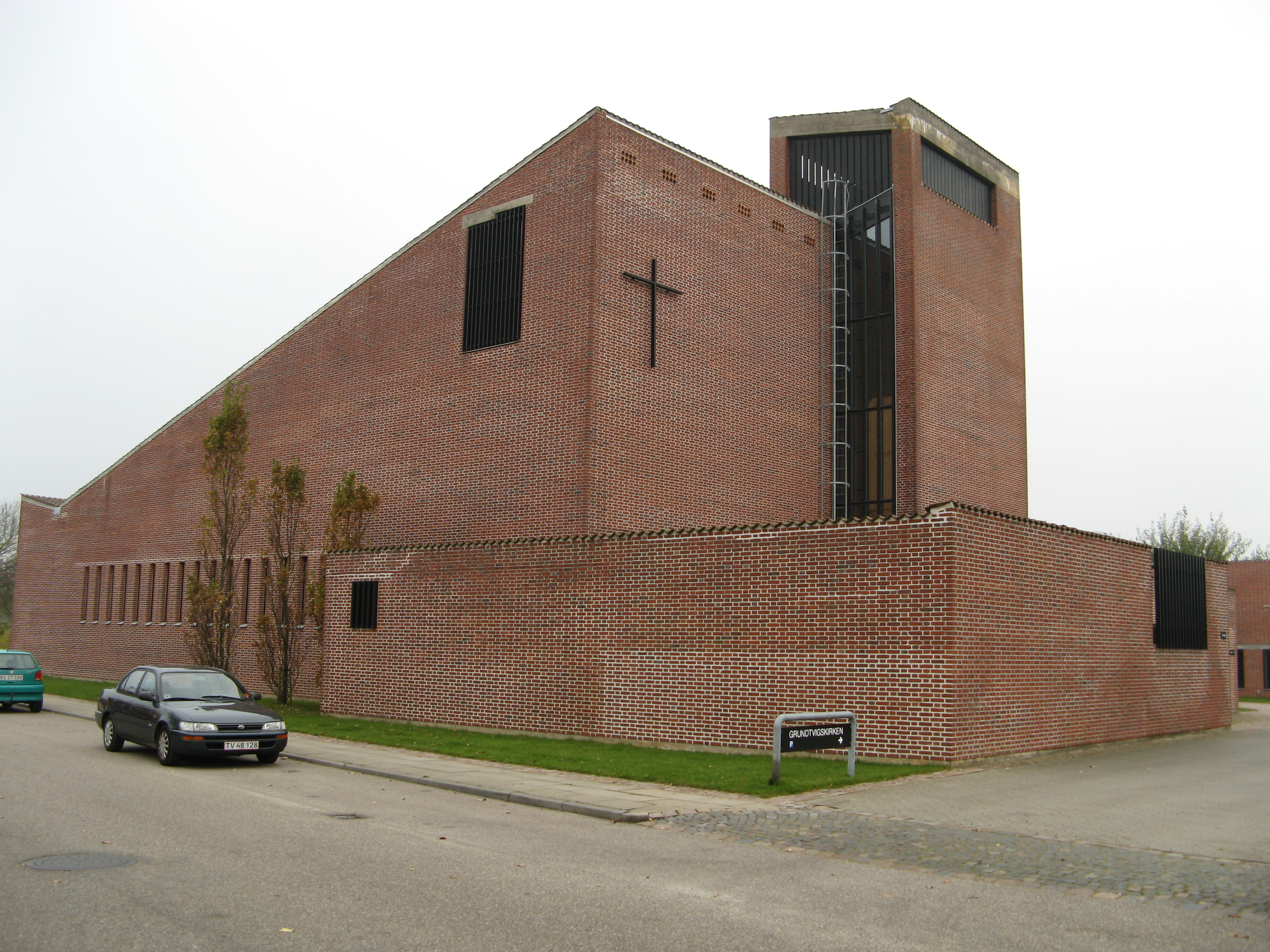
- Grundtvig's Church
- Location: Esbjerg
- Country: Denmark
- Denomination: Church of Denmark
- Website: https://www.grundtvigskirken.dk/

History
- Founded: 1969

Administration
- Diocese: Diocese of Ribe
- Deanery: Skads Provsti
- Parish: Grundtvigs Sogn

Grundtvig's Church (Danish: Grundtvigskirken) is a modern church in Esbjerg in the southwest of Jutland, Denmark. Designed by Ole Nielsen of Lyngby, the building of dark red brick with a red-tiled roof was completed in 1969.

== Background ==
The process leading to a decision on the church's construction dragged on for decades. As far back as the 1920s, the church committee of the Church of Our Saviour had discussed building a church to be named Rørkjær Church near Rørkjæar School southeast of the town centre. Matters were delayed after Jerne Parish was incorporated into Esbjerg Municipality, as well as by the Second World War (1940–1945). Further delays occurred when the congrational committee of Zion's Church discussed and finally decided to build Trinity Church (completed in 1961) in the east area of the town. Nevertheless, a competition was arranged in 1957, with Ole Nielsen submitting one of the 130 proposals but no decision was made owing to financial difficulties caused by inflation. In 1966, after it became easier to obtain a building loan, Nielsen's offer was accepted and the foundation stone was laid. The new parish was separated from Trinity Parish (Vor Frelsers Sogn) and the church was consecrated in 1969.

== Architecture ==
The complex consists of the church itself with parish rooms to the west surrounding a courtyard. There is also a closed courtyard with a funeral chapel. The rectangular nave flanking Grundtvigs Allé with an altar to the north is completed by a low transverse tower behind the altar wall. The church's V-shaped roof rises towards the tower while a short area of roofing covers the organ loft at the south end.

Inside, the large wall surfaces are broken only by 12 narrow windows on the east side, creating a contrast with the much brighter tower room which opens into the chancel with light entering from a window high on the east side of the tower. The steeply inclined ceiling is of untreated boarding. The floor, which falls towards the slightly raised altar, is paved with white Italian marble tiling. The altar and pulpit are brick. There is a simple wooden cross above the altar which is decorated as the Tree of Life. The font is a solid granite block. The organ from 1971 was made by Frobenius & Sons, Lyngby. It has 18 stops, three manuals and a pedal.

== Literature ==
- Søndergaard, Helmer (1970). Grundtvigskirken i Esbjerg.
