= Esbjerg Printing Museum =

Coordinates: 55°27′54″N 8°27′21″E

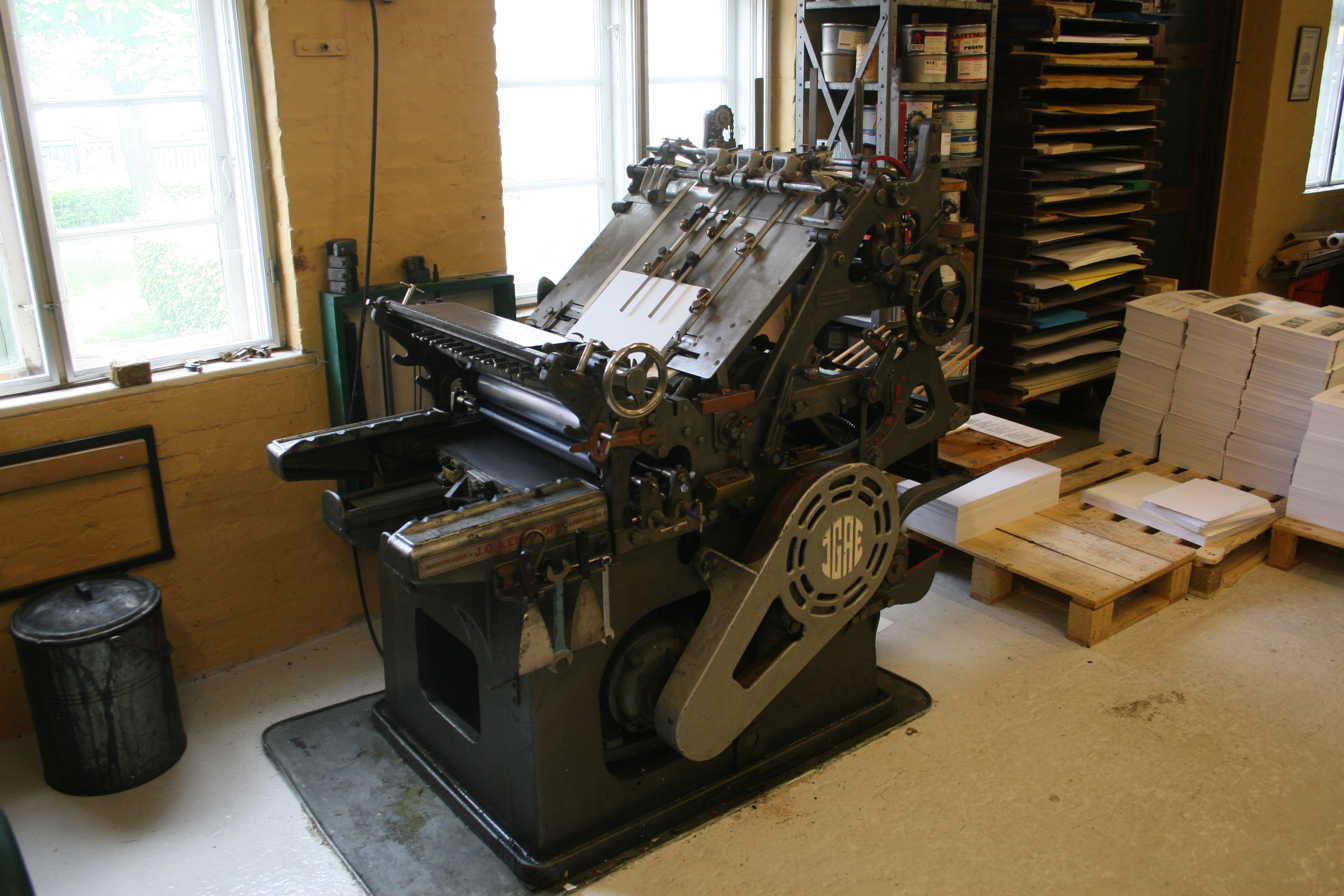
Danish Eickhoff press in the collection

The Esbjerg Printing Museum (Danish: Bogtrykmuseet i Esbjerg) is located in the city of Esbjerg in the southwest of Jutland, Denmark. Established in 1979, it traces the history of the art of printing from the beginning of the 20th century until it was replaced by more rapid technologies. The collection includes a variety of equipment used to print books and newspapers, mainly from Germany and Denmark.

== History ==
The members of Esbjerg typografiske Laug were themselves typographers. As they had difficulty in storing the machines they acquired, they ended up in various locations throughout Esbjerg. Prior to the opening of the museum, a composing machine and a printing press were stored in a garage in Neptunvej.

The building in which the museum is housed was originally a farm produce facility built by Niels Hedegaard in 1905 for packing eggs and butter for export. In 1953, the property was purchased by I.C. Nielsen who used it as a smithy. In 1978, it was acquired by the local authority who made it available for Esbjerg typografisk Laug (Esbjerg Typographical Guild) who established the Bogtrykmuseet i Esbjerg in 1881.

The Museum's supporters organization has about 700 members.

== Museum ==
In the Composing Room, there are over a hundred wood and lead types. There are four fully operational type-setting machines: a Typograph, two Intertypes and a Linotype, all over a hundred years old. The Museum contains a large collection of printing types, displacing a fraction of its large collections of type cases for different font sizes from small lead and types including large carved pear-wood type, as well as composing tools and composing sticks. The Printing Room houses a collection from the Eickhoff factory in Copenhagen which was active from the 1890s until the mid-20th century.
