= Courthouse and Jail, Esbjerg =

Building in Esbjerg, Denmark

Coordinates: 55°28′01″N 8°27′09″E

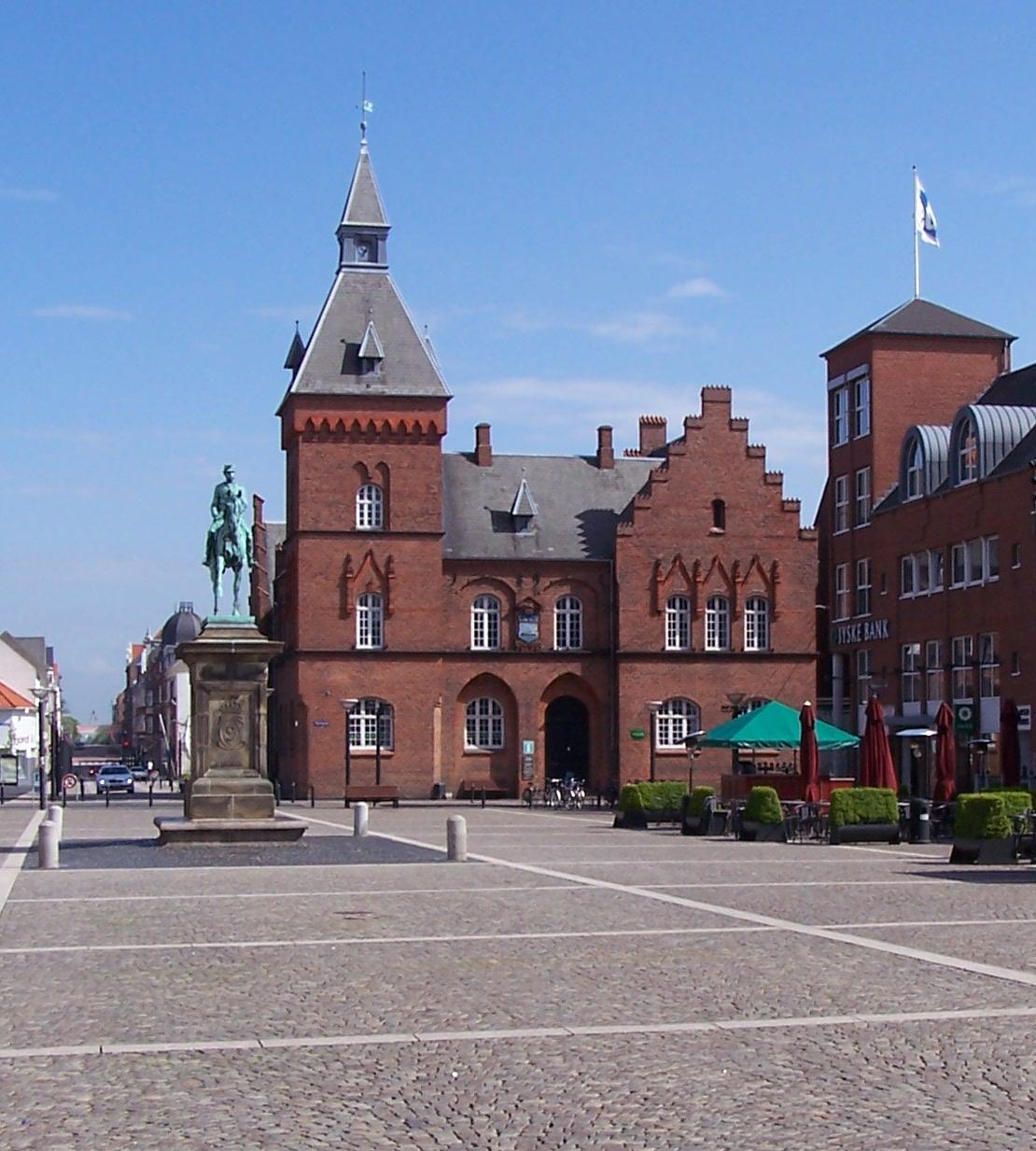
Esbjerg's old courthouse building

The former Courthouse and Jail (Danish: Ting- og Arresthuset) in Esbjerg, Denmark, was designed by Hans Christian Amberg and completed in 1892 on the city's central square. At the time, Esbjerg had only 4,000 inhabitants but ten years later it had grown to around 13,000.

== History and architecture ==
The red-brick building with stepped gable's, round-arched windows and a tower reaching 30 m (98 ft) in height resembles a medieval castle. Built in the imposing Historicist style, it owes its existence to the rapidly expanding local population who had purchased the land and pressed for permission to build a courthouse since the 1870s. Hans Christian Amberg who designed the building is remembered principally for his work on Ribe Cathedral. The courthouse is one of the few buildings he designed from scratch, most of his work being devoted to restoration.

The building also housed the meeting room for the municipal council as well as the legal authorities and the police department. The premises were however too small for the city's requirements and by 1960 the municipal authorities had offices at 13 different locations in the city centre. Work finally began on the construction of a new town hall in 1967 although the Courthouse Building remained in use until the end of 1970. In 2002, the municipal authorities once again moved into the building when the newly restored wedding hall above the main entrance came into use.

In 2010, Realdania purchased the dilapidated building in order to undertake renovation and refurbishment. The work was completed in August 2013 providing premises suitable for weddings as well as for the needs of the municipal tourist office and the social services. Esbjerg's mayor, Johnny Søtrup, commented: "The building was an important component in the story of Esbjerg's development. A building from and for the citizens of Esbjerg... We look forward to developing activities in it for the benefit of our city, citizens and visitors."
