= Dronning Louise, Esbjerg =

Restaurant and pub in Esbjerg, Denmark

Coordinates: 55°28′01″N 8°27′09″E

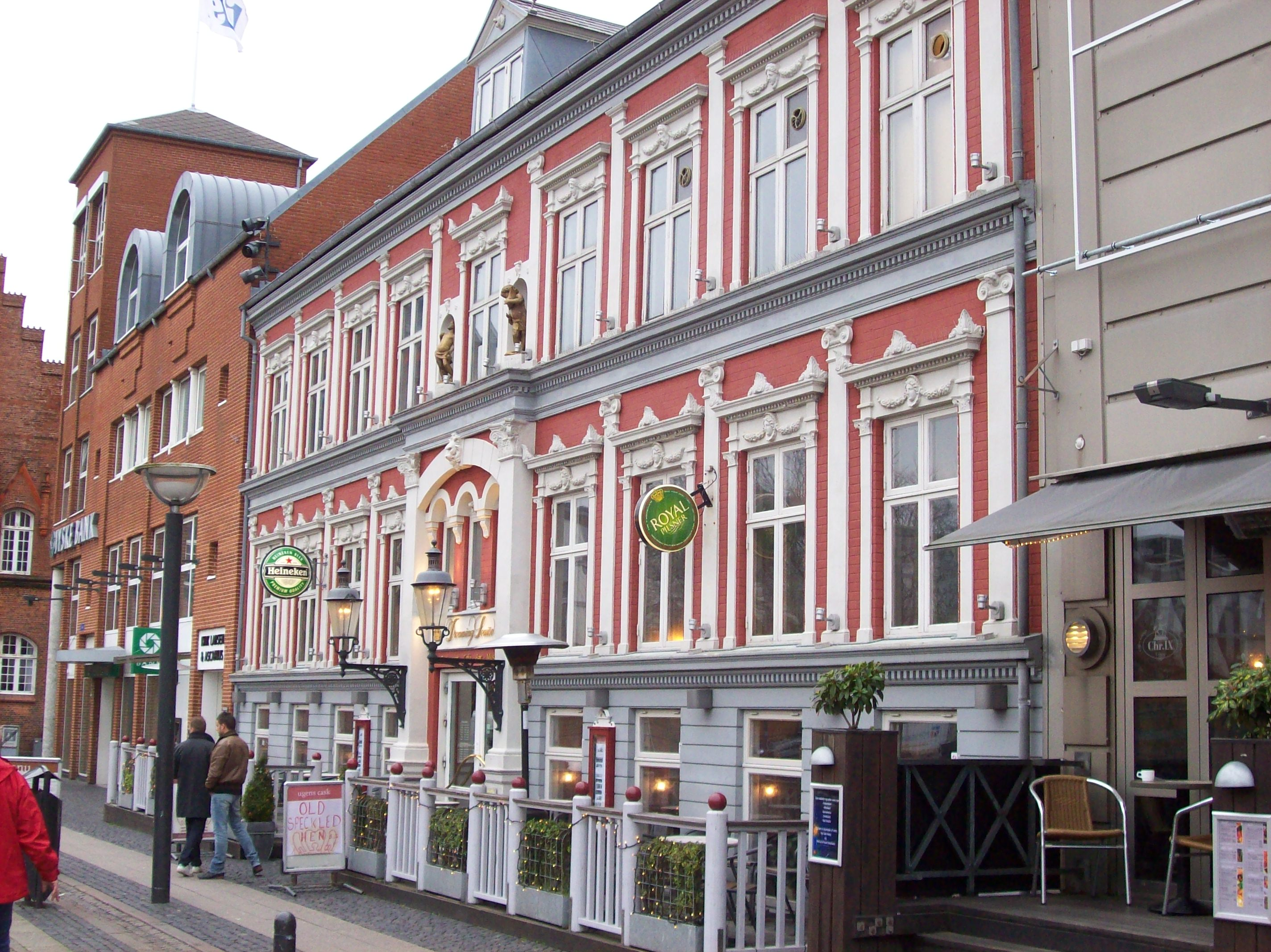
Dronning Louise, Esbjerg

The Dronning Louise (Queen Louise) is a restaurant and pub in the centre of Esbjerg, Denmark. A listed building since 1989, its facade overlooking the market place was fully restored in 1994.

== History ==
Located on Esbjerg's market square (Torvet), the two-storey building was designed as a hotel and completed in 1890. Over the years, it has also been used for offices and shops but has mainly been a pub. After it became a listed building in 1989, the facade of brick and sandstone was fully restored in 1993–94.
