= Gjesing Church =

Coordinates: 55°30′28″N 8°26′51″E

- Gjesing Kirke
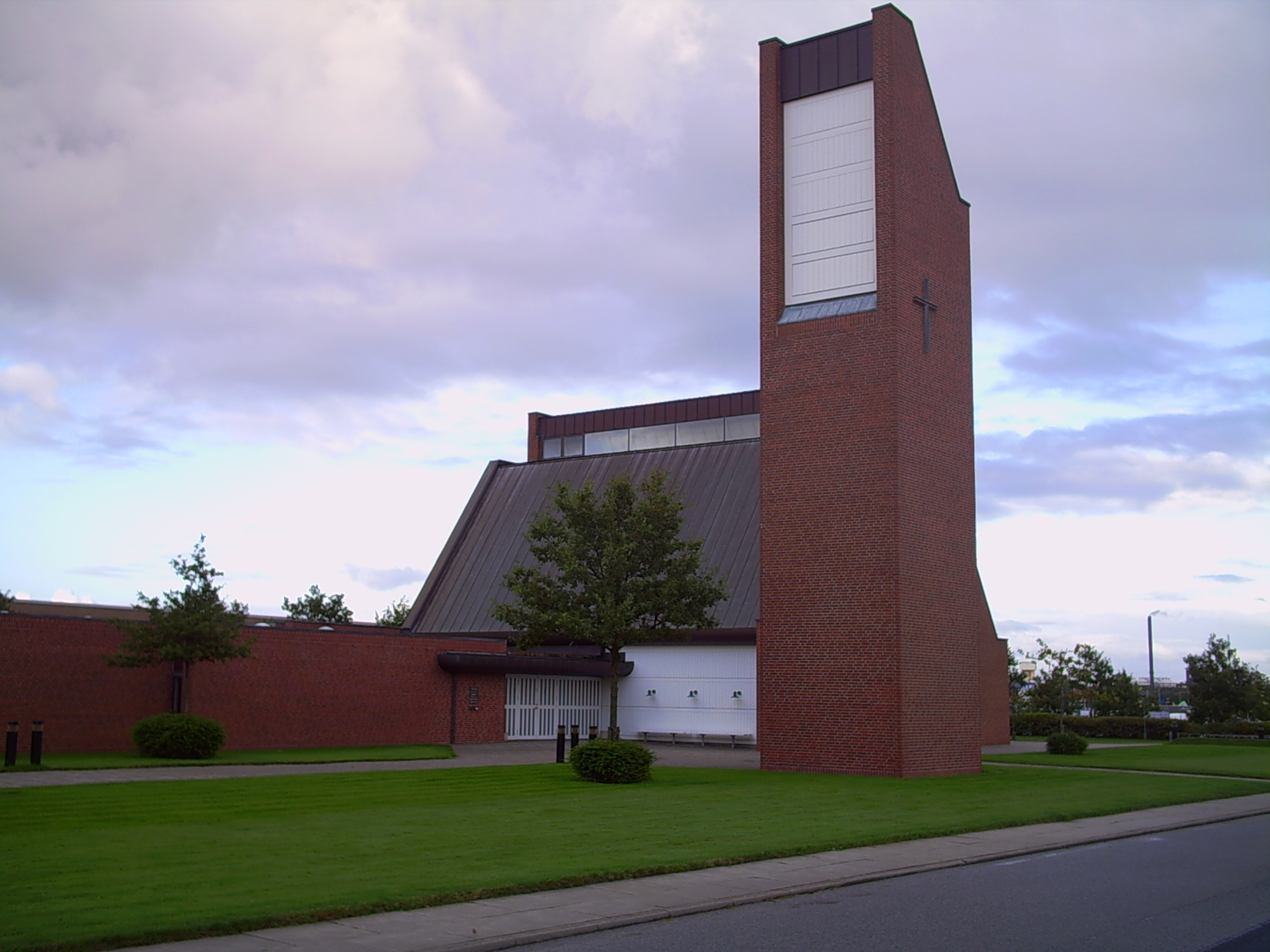
- Gjesing Church
- Location: Esbjerg
- Country: Denmark
- Denomination: Church of Denmark

Architecture
- Years built: 1982–1983

Administration
- Diocese: Diocese of Ribe
- Deanery: Skads Provsti
- Parish: Gjesing Sogn

Gjesing Church, also Gesing Church, (Danish: Gjesing Kirke) is a modern church in Esbjerg in the southwest of Jutland, Denmark. Designed by architects Niels Munk and Keld Wohlert, the red-brick building with a steeply pitched roof was completed in 1983.

== Background ==
In 1979, Gjesing Parish was established in the northern suburbs of Esbjerg. The area had previously formed part of Bryndum Parish. Initially, a temporary building served the new parish until, following a competition between four architectural firms in 1979, a complex designed by Niels Munk and Keld Wohlert of Solrød Strand was inaugurated on 30 January 1983. In 2010, the complex was extended with a meeting room, a handicapped toilet and three offices. The church is adjacent to Esbjerg Storcenter, a shopping centre, in a residential area with apartment buildings and detached houses.

== Architecture ==
Under the same tall roof, the complex consists of the church proper to the east and a parish hall to the west. A corridor connects the two and leads to offices, a classroom for confirmation candidates and atriums. The ground plan, which also consists of a porch and waiting room to the west and a sacristy and a chapel to the east, can be described as two large rectangles with two steep half-roofs, set off a little from one another. Light from glazed rifts in the roofing above comes into the nave from the south and north gables, with a similar approach in the church hall. The entire complex is built of red brick, with zig-zag patterns in the gable brickwork, and is roofed with copper. The free-standing bell tower stands to the southwest.

Inside, the harmoniously designed nave has an open roof trussed ceiling, finished with white sheeting, and whitewashed walls. Three old bricks from the mother church in Bryndum are built into the wall behind the pulpit. The floor is laid with red tiles. A white altar table of pine stands beside the east wall. The font takes the form of an intersected cylinder consisting of four blocks of Bornholm granite. Seen from above, the blocks form a cross. The pulpit, which resembles a normal speaking podium, rises only slightly above the floor. Like the altar, the pulpit and the pews are made of pine.

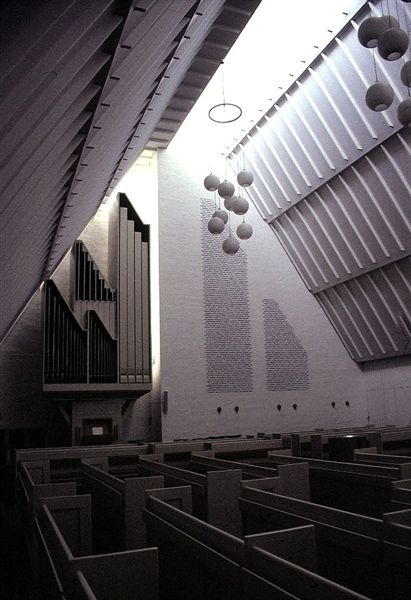
Organ and trussed ceiling

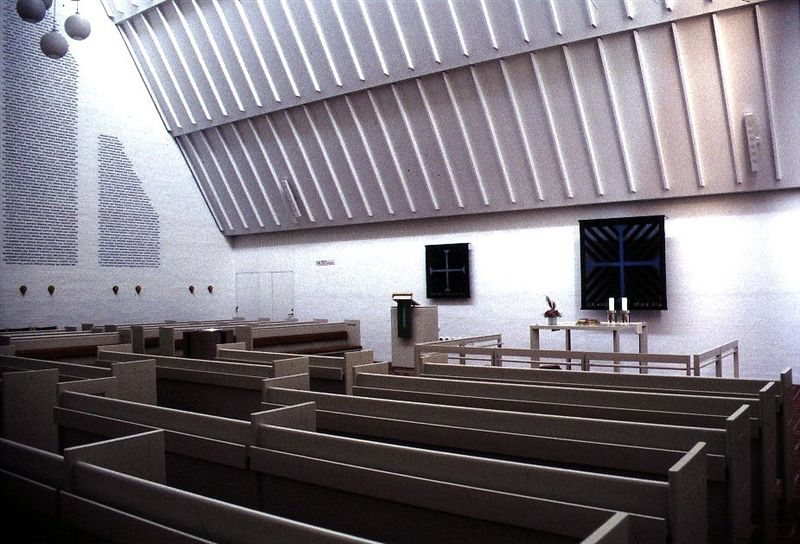
Nave (looking east)

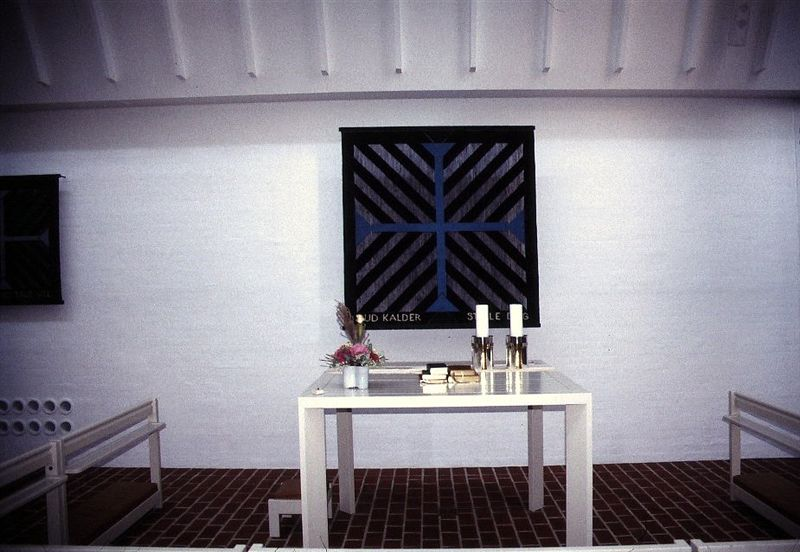
Altar

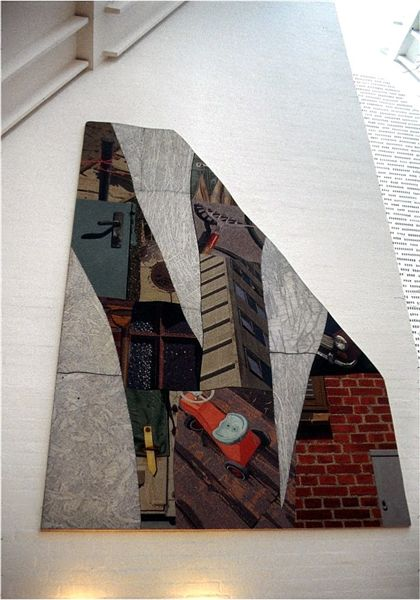
Parish hall decoration
