= Nassauer Haus =

Medieval residential tower

Coordinates: 49°27′4.0″N 11°4′39.81″E

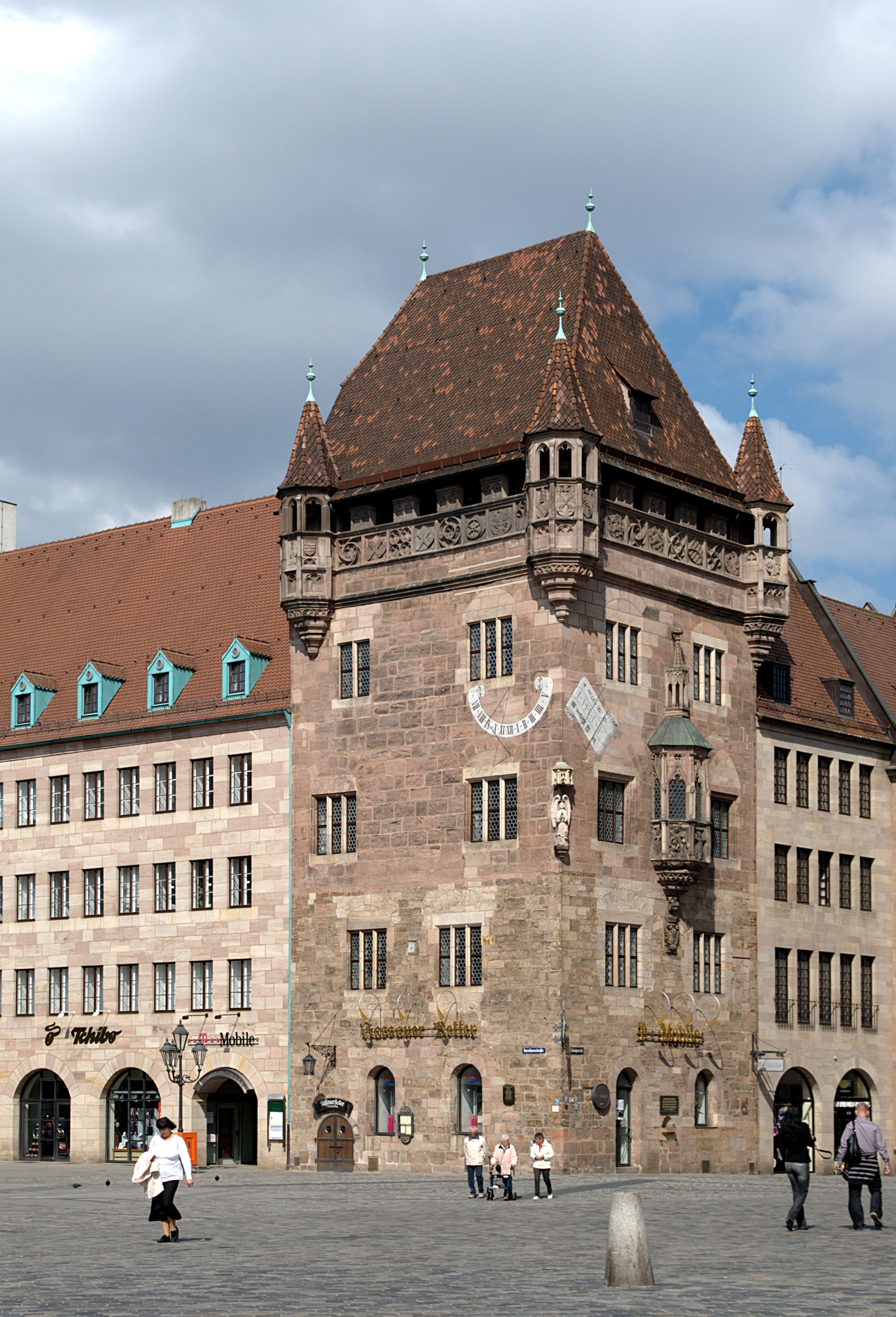
Nassauer Haus, 2010

The Nassauer Haus or Schlüsselfeldersche Stiftungshaus in Nuremberg is a medieval residential tower made of so-called red castle sandstone. Although originally built in Romanesque style, after several reconstructions the house is still characterized by Gothic style elements. It is the last still existing residential tower in Nuremberg.

The tower stands in the Lorenzer Altstadt, opposite the Lorenzkirche, in Karolinenstraße 2.

== History ==
The name "Nassauer Haus" is the name in use for the corner house only since the 19th century and is based on an erroneous reference to the German king Adolf von Nassau († 1298). Until then, the building was referred to (since the early 18th century) as Schlüsselfelderisches Stiftungshaus.. However, descendants of the king from the count's House of Nassau had possessions further north of the Lorenzkirche in the 15th century.

The construction method for fortified tower houses or residential towers came in the 13th century from Upper Italian cities to the German Reichsstädte trading with them. "Geschlechtertürme" were widespread in the (rather weakly fortified) trade centers to protect trade goods from raids, furthermore also as status symbols of noble families who had moved into the cities. In Regensburg, several family towers based on the Italian model are still preserved. Around 1430, about 65 are also said to have existed in Nuremberg, of which the Nassau House is the only surviving one.

The cellar (with an irregular cross-ribbed vault) and the two lower floors are dated to the 13th century. Around the 16th century, the vault of the cellar was raised, as well as that of the first floor. The hall-like cellar is used today as an inn. The two upper floors, which are clearly distinguished by regular ashlar masonry of a reddish hue from the small-scale structured masonry of the lower floors, belong to the 15th century. The original tower may have risen freestanding above the low wooden houses in the vicinity and may also have supported a wooden or half-timbered superstructure in the manner of the Amorbacher Templerhaus. At least the penultimate floor can be attributed to a reconstruction around 1422 by the then owner Jobst Haug. The top floor with its coat of arms frieze and the three pointed-helmeted corner towers was brought into the existing form around 1433 by Ulrich Ortlieb, who is also credited with the choir. The tower has a pyramid-shaped hipped roof.

The residential tower probably only became a "fortified tower" for romantic observers of the 19th century, who may have seen a uniform building in it, whereby the decorative battlement, the coat of arms frieze and the royal attribution may have contributed to this assessment. The most important external change is the installation of the round arched openings on the first floor in 1836; one of them was enlarged to a door around 1900. In the early period, the stone floors of the tower may have had only slit windows or embrasures and a high entrance, as was customary at the time.

== Owner ==
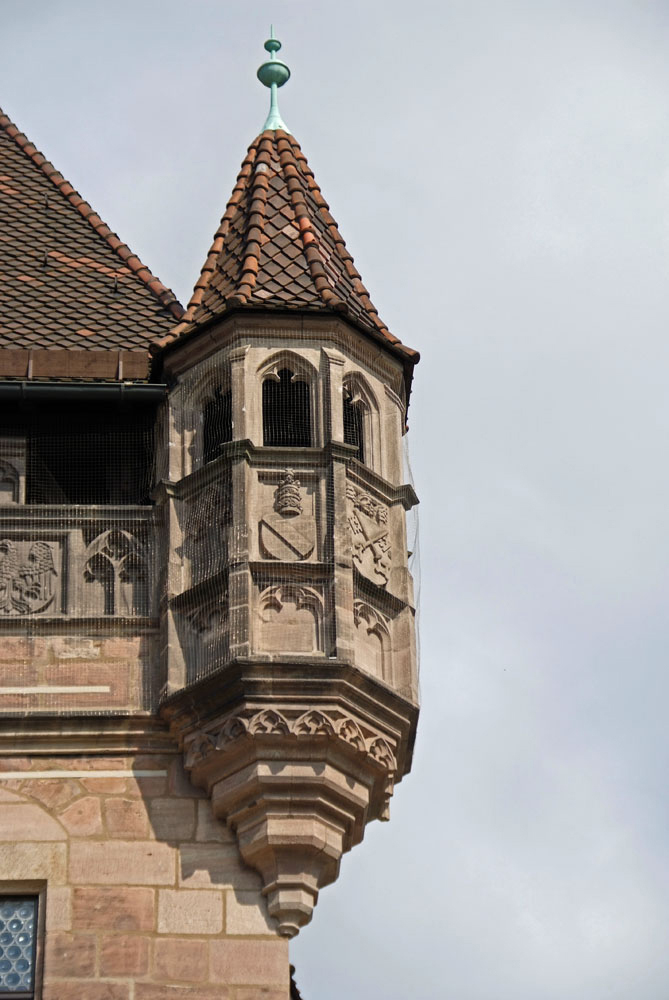
Ecktürmchen des Nassauer Hauses

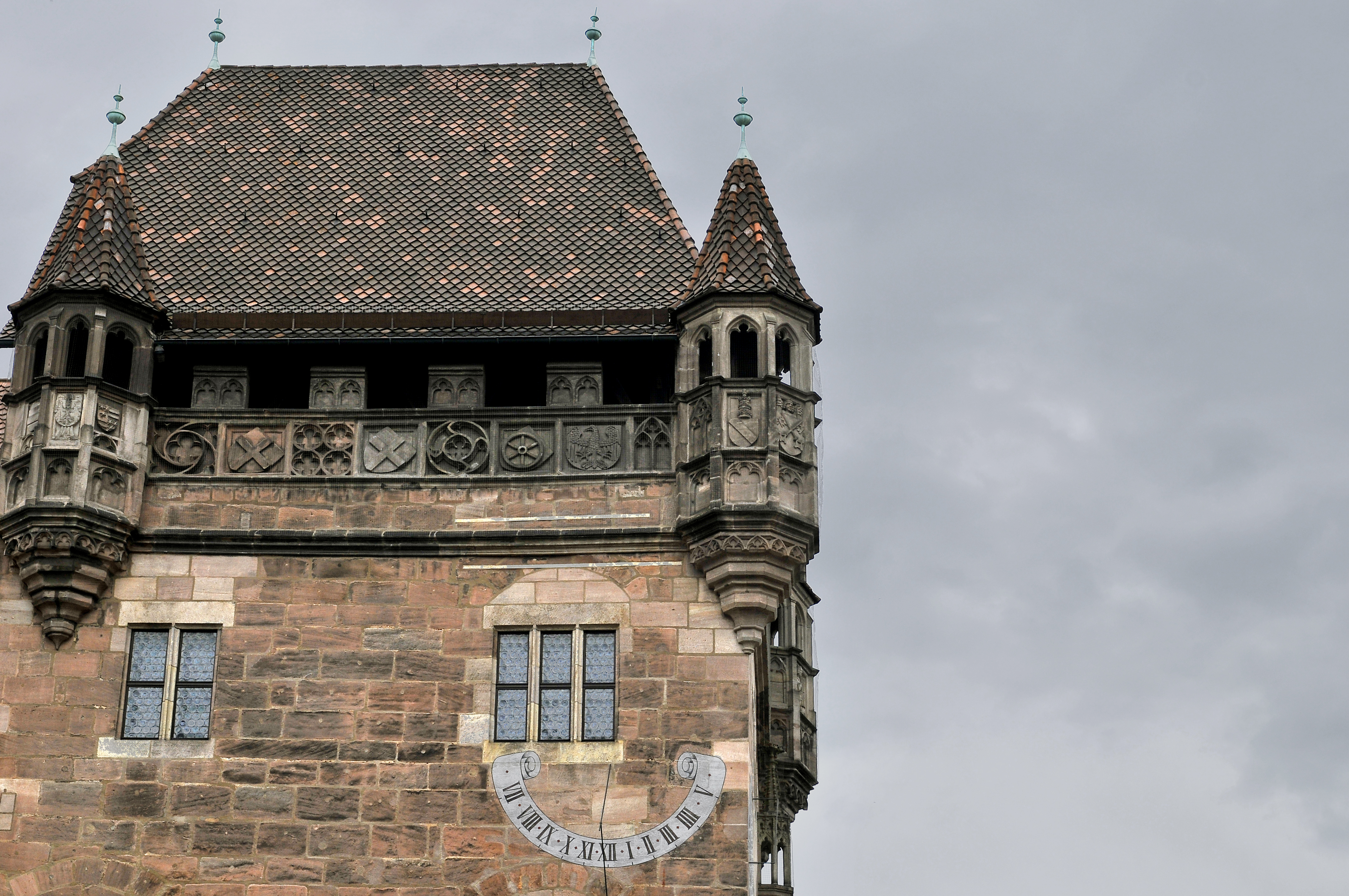

According to the latest knowledge, the following coats of arms are attached to the house (starting from the southwestern bay window): Archduchy of Austria, the large city arms of Nuremberg, County of Cilli, Electorate of Trier, Electorate of Cologne, Electorate of Mainz, Roman King, Pope Eugene IV, Holy See, city of Rome, Roman Emperor, Kurbohemia, Electoral Palatinate, Kursachsen, Kurbrandenburg, St. Lorenz, the small city arms of Nuremberg, the coat of the Ortlieb. With its coat of arms decoration, the Nassau House possesses the earliest example of the two city coats of arms, as well as of the coexistence of royal and (double-headed) imperial eagle.

== Effects of war ==
American Bombing of 1945 severely hit the tower, the roof and the top floor with two of the three turrets were largely destroyed (the left turret is original), the upper floors burned out. Reconstruction took place between 1950 and 1954. The building was restored by Rudo Göschel on behalf of the Schlüsselfelder Family Foundation, which is still the owner today. The coat of arms frieze was also largely renewed, fragments of the original parts are still in the tower.

On the second floor there is now a banqueting hall with a rococo stucco ceiling, which originally came from the Ebracher Hof in Adlerstraße, which was demolished in 1901. It was then first moved to the old library of the Germanic National Museum, which was later also demolished due to road construction measures. In 1976, the ceiling then came to Nassauer Haus.

== Gallery ==
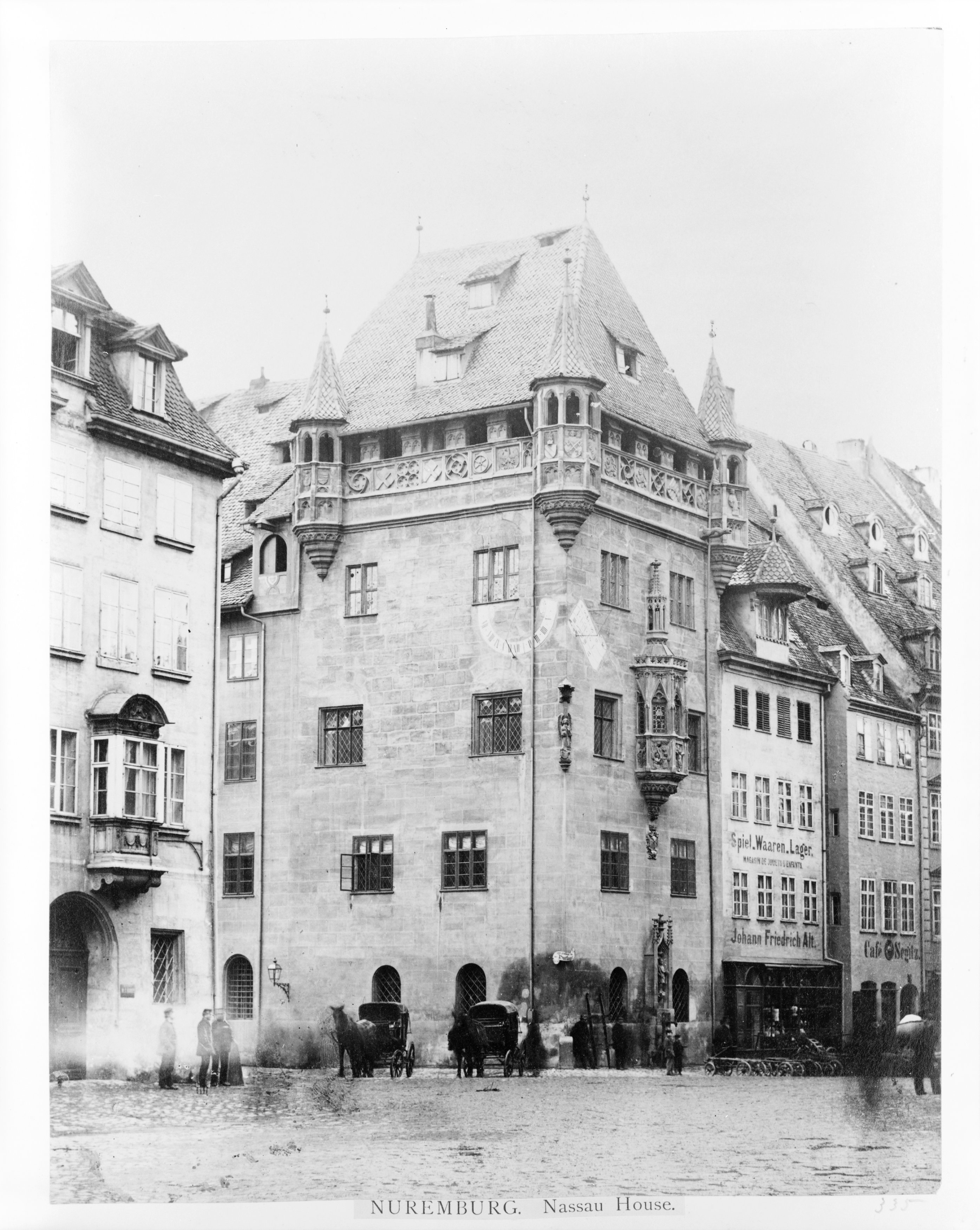
Fotografie, 1860–1890

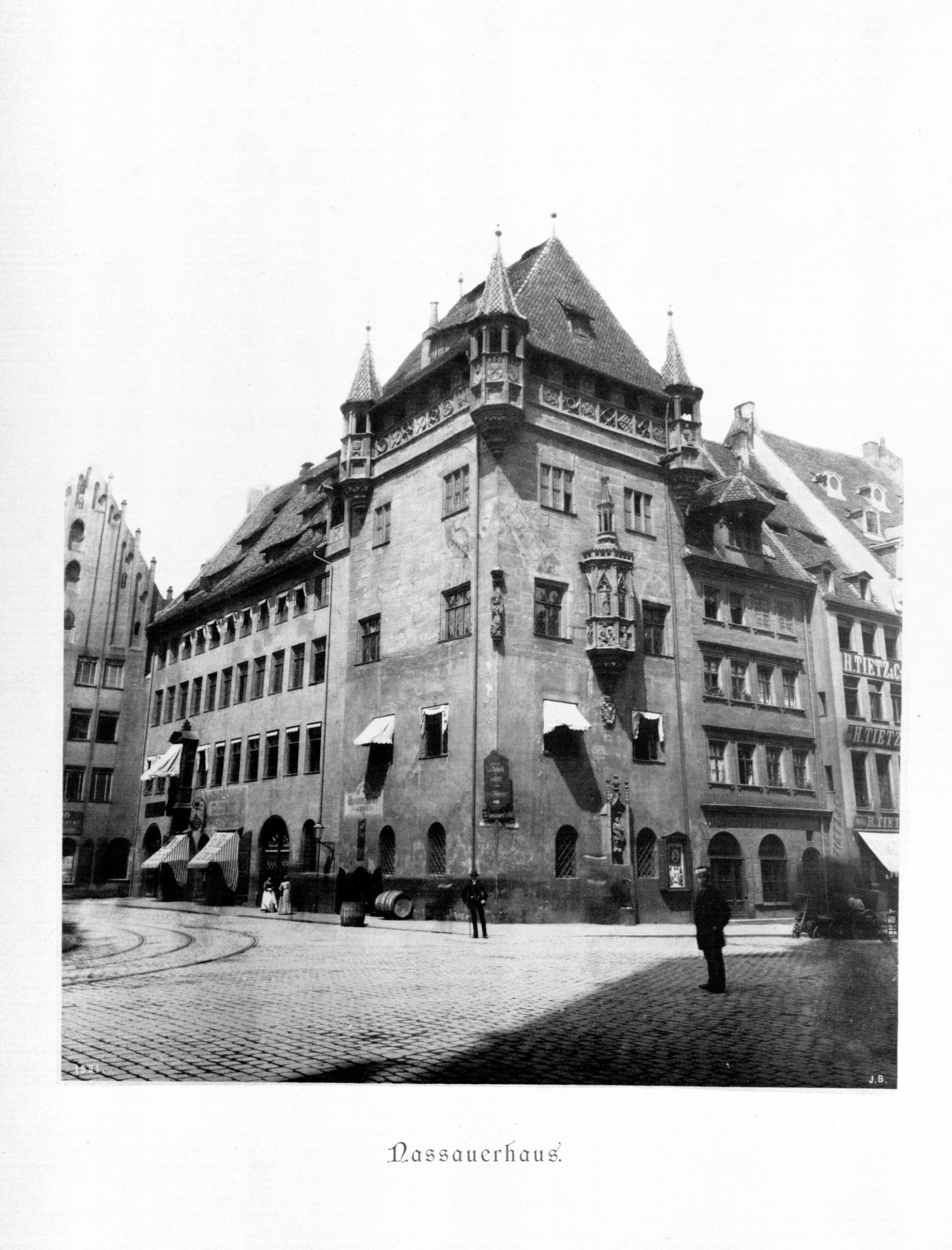
Fotografie, 1891

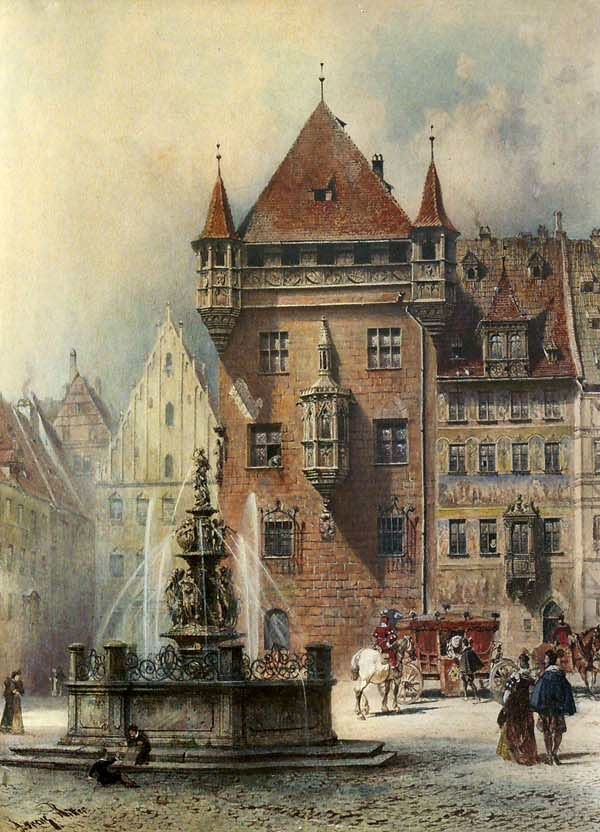
Aquarell von Lorenz Ritter, c. 1900

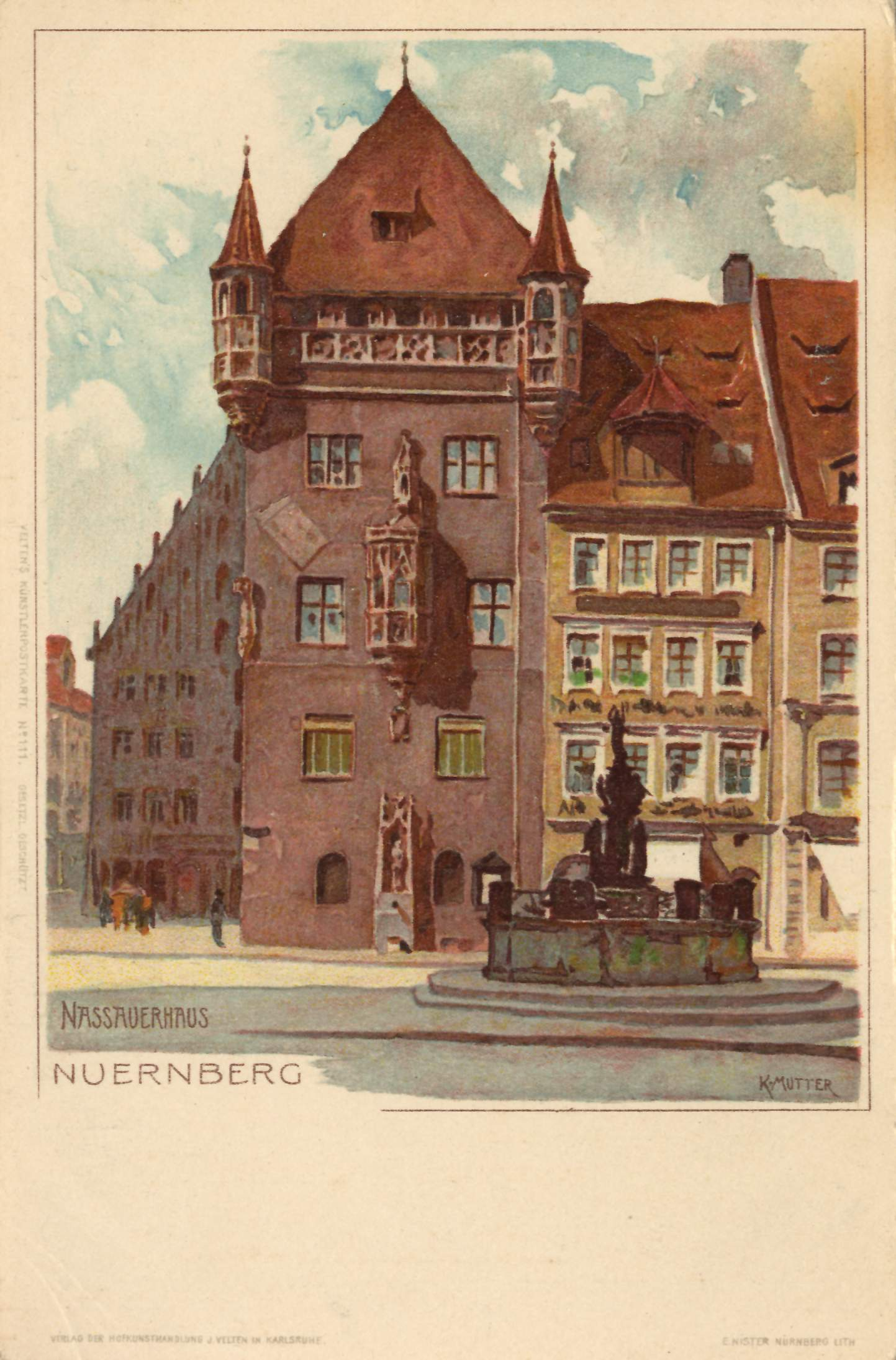
Postkarte, c. 1900

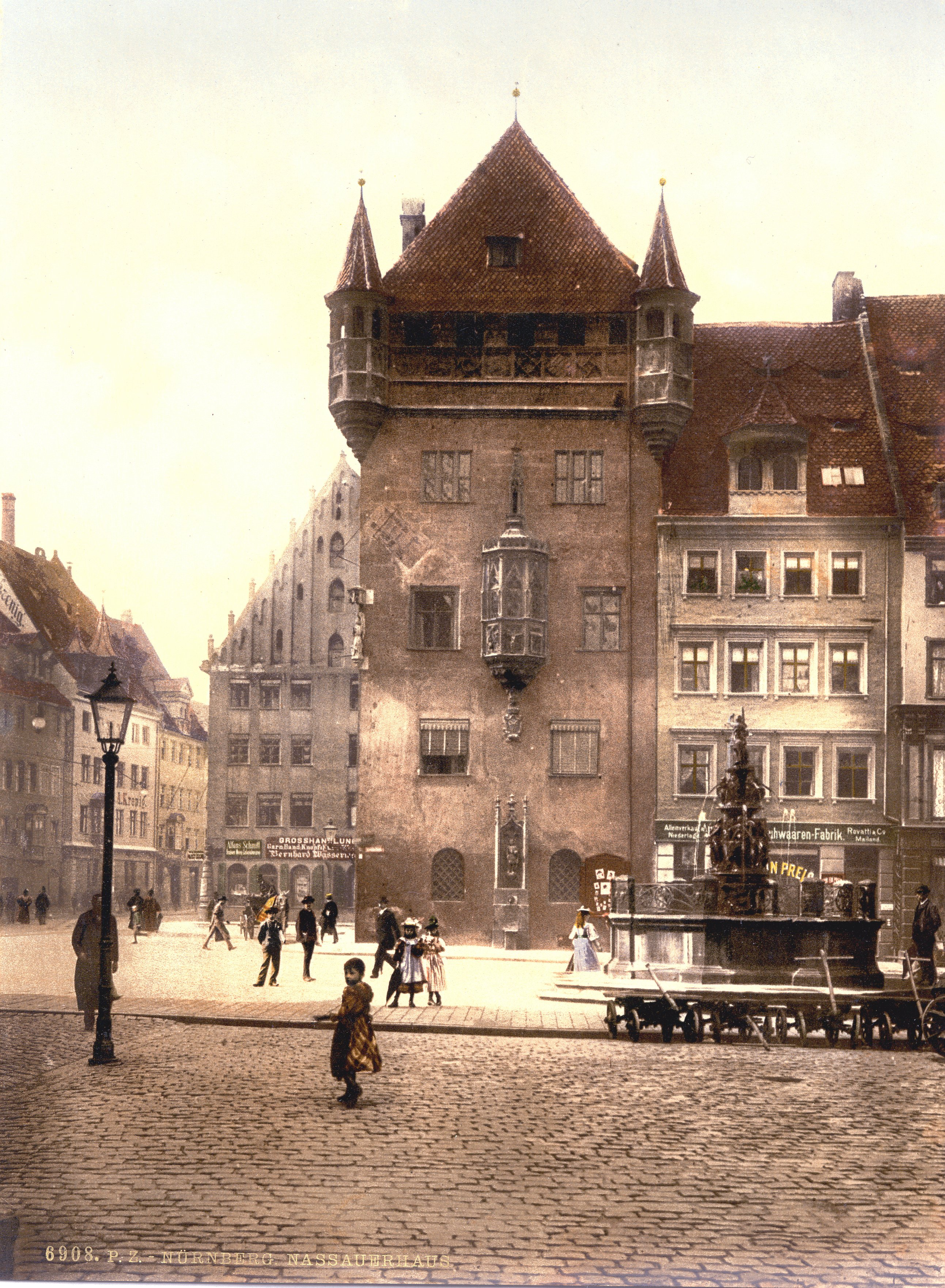
Photochromdruck, c. 1900

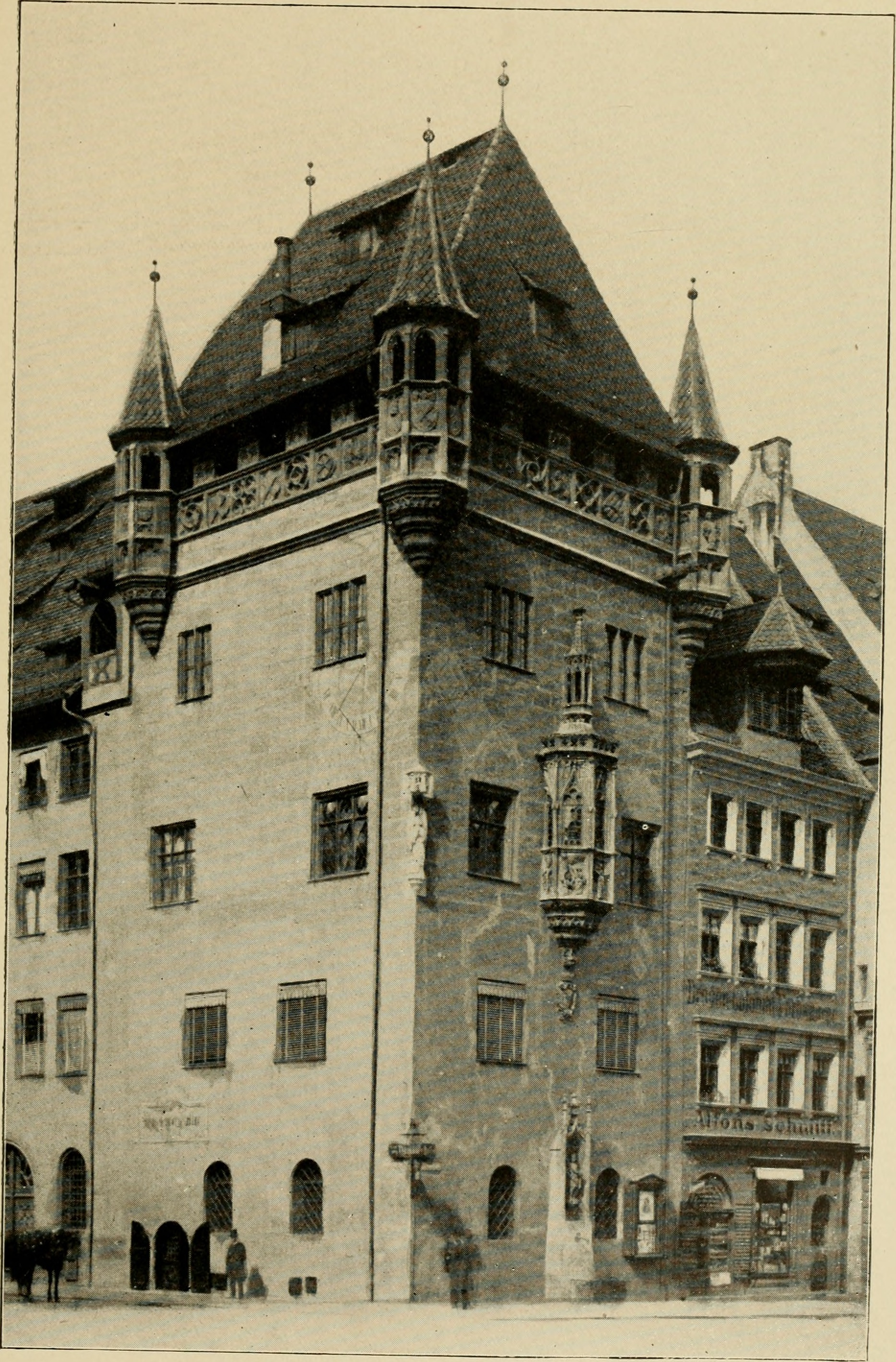
1907

== See also ==
- Schlüsselfelder von Kirchensittenbach
- Castles, palaces and manor houses in the Nuremberg city area

== Literature ==
- Helge Weingärtner (2000), Michael Diefenbacher, Rudolf Endres (ed.), Nassauerhaus, Nuremberg City Lexicon (Stadtlexikon Nürnberg) (in German) (2nd, revised ed.), Nuremberg: W. Tümmels Verlag, ISBN 3-921590-69-8
- Günter P. Fehring, Anton Ress (Begr.), Wilhelm Schwemmer (Bearb.): Die Stadt Nürnberg. (= Bayerische Kunstdenkmale). 2. Auflage. Deutscher Kunstverlag, München 1977, ISBN 3-422-00550-1, S. 227–228
- Christoph von Imhoff (Hrsg.): Berühmte Nürnberger aus neun Jahrhunderten. 2., erg. u. erw. Auflage. Hofmann, Nürnberg 1989, ISBN 3-87191-088-0 (Neuauflage: Edelmann Buchhandlung, 2000)
