= 2025 Summer World Masters Games =

Multi-sport event in Taiwan

X Summer World Masters Games
- Host city: Taipei and New Taipei City, Taiwan
- Motto: Sports Beyond Age, Life Without Limits! (Chinese: 運動無界｜人生無限)
- Nations: 108
- Athletes: 25,049
- Events: 35 sports
- Opening: 17 May 2025
- Closing: 30 May 2025
- Opened by: Hsiao Bi-khim; Vice President of Taiwan
- Athlete's Oath: Chou Szu-chi (Taipei City); Lin Shuo (New Taipei City); Chang Wei-chieh (Para-athlete)
- Torch lighter: Lin Yu-ting (Youth); Peng Cheng-min (Sports); Lin Yu-mao (Inclusivity); Sylvia Chang (Culture); Jensen Huang (Technology)
- Main venue: Taipei Dome
- Website: wmg2025.tw

Summer

Winter

The 2025 Summer World Masters Games (Chinese: 2025年夏季世界壯年運動會), commonly known as Taipei & New Taipei 2025, was an international multi-sport event that took place from 17 May to 30 May 2025 in Taipei and New Taipei, Taiwan.

It was the third international multi-sport event that was held in Taipei–Keelung metropolitan area after the 2009 Summer Deaflympics and 2017 Summer Universiade.

== Bidding process ==
The three candidate cities were Taipei/New Taipei, Paris and Perth.

=== Host city selection ===
The International Masters Games Association (IMGA) voted to select the host city of the 2025 Summer World Masters Games on 21 October 2020, Taipei/ New Taipei was selected, and sign contract on 23 December 2020.

== Development and preparation ==
The Taipei/ New Taipei Organizing Committee was headed by mayor Ko Wen-je and Hou Yu-ih, it began operation on 7 May 2021.

=== Venues ===
==== Taipei ====
- Taipei Dome - opening ceremony, baseball, softball
- Tianmu Baseball Stadium - baseball, softball
- Taipei Heping Basketball Gymnasium - basketball, tug of war
- Da'an Sports Center - basketball
- Taipei Songshan Sports Center - aquatics (water polo)
- Taipei Tennis Center - tennis
- Dajia Riverside Park - canoeing (dragon boat)
- Taipei Arena - dancesport, judo
- Taipei City Hall - athletics (road race), beach volleyball
- Taipei Municipal Stadium - athletics (track and field)
- Huazhong Riverside Park - flying disc
- Taipei Gymnasium - badminton
- Yingfeng Riverside Park - baseball, softball, football
- Bailing Riverside Park - rugby
- Guanshan Riverside Park - boules, cycling, tug of war, woodball
- Bishan Campsite - orienteering
- Sun Yat-sen Memorial Hall - orienteering (finish)
- National Taiwan University Sports Center - squash
- University of Taipei (Tianmu Campus) Shih-hsin Hall - aquatics (diving)
- University of Taipei (Tianmu Campus) Gymnasium - fencing, karate
- Chinese Culture University Gymnasium - volleyball
- Expo Dome - weightlifting
- Jinshan Huangqing Bridge - cycling (road)

==== New Taipei City ====
- New Taipei City Art Museum - closing ceremony
- Xinzhuang Baseball Stadium - baseball, softball
- Sanchong Civil Sports Center - 3x3 basketball
- Xinzhuang Civil Sports Center - aquatics (swimming)
- Banqiao Civil Sports Center - basketball
- Xindian Civil Sports Center - volleyball
- Luzhou Civil Sports Center - handball
- Shulin Tennis Clay Courts - tennis
- Banshu Gymnasium - taekwondo
- Blue Bay Coastal Leisure Area - beach volleyball
- Banqiao Stadium - archery, athletics (track and field)
- Xinzhuang Gymnasium - table tennis
- New Taipei City Plaza - 3x3 basketball
- Sanchung Baseball Stadium - baseball, softball
- Breeze Canal - aquatics (open water), canoeing (dragon boat, canoe polo, sprint)
- Metropolitan Baseball Field - baseball, softball
- Fulong Beach - lifesaving, sailing
- Fu Jen Catholic University Chung Mei Auditorium - basketball
- Fu Jen Catholic University Stadium - football
- Taiwan Golf & Country Club - golf
- Linkou International Golf and Country Club - golf

==== Outlying ====
===== Taoyuan =====
- Longtan Sports Complex - hockey
- Taoyuan City Track and Field Stadium - gateball
- Gongxi Shooting Range - shooting
- Sunrise Golf & Country Club - golf
- Taipei Golf Club - golf
- Luzhu Civil Sports Center - squash

===== Hsinchu County =====
- Hsinchu County Second Stadium - football
- Lily Golf & Country Club - golf

===== Yilan County =====
- Dongshan River Water Park - rowing
- Meihua Lake - triathlon
- Annong River - canoeing (slalom)
- Wushi Harbor Waiao Beach - surfing

===== Taichung City =====
- Taichung Cycling Track - cycling (track)

== The Games ==
=== Opening ceremony ===
The opening ceremony was held on May 17, 2025, at the Taipei Dome in Taipei.

=== Sports ===
The Organizing Committee, in addition to the 19 compulsory sports, opted to add thirteen more sports in the program of this edition of the Games.

- Aquatics
  - Diving
  - Open water swimming
  - Swimming
  - Water polo
- Archery
- Athletics
- Badminton
- Baseball
- Basketball
  - Basketball
  - 3x3 basketball
- Boules
- Canoeing
  - Slalom
  - Sprint
  - Canoe polo
  - Dragon boat
  - Marathon
- Cycling
  - Road cycling
- Dancesport
- Flying disc
  - Disc golf
  - Ultimate
- Football
- Gateball (demonstration)
- Golf
- Handball
- Hockey
- Judo
- Karate
  - Kata
  - Kumite
- Lifesaving
- Orienteering
- Rowing
- Rugby sevens
- Sailing
- Shooting
- Softball
  - Softball
  - Slow softball
- Squash
- Surfing
- Table tennis
- Taekwondo
- Tennis
- Triathlon
  - Triathlon
  - Aquathlon
- Tug of war
- Volleyball
  - Volleyball (indoor)
  - Beach volleyball
- Weightlifting
- Woodball (demonstration)

=== Closing ceremony ===
The closing ceremony was held on May 30, 2025, at the New Taipei City Art Museum in New Taipei City.

== Calendar ==
In the following calendar for the 2025 Summer World Masters Games, each blue box represents an event competition, such as a qualification round, on that day. The yellow boxes represent days during which medal-awarding finals for a sport were held. On the left, the calendar lists each sport with events held during the Games, and on the right how many gold medals were won in that sport. There is a key at the top of the calendar to aid the reader.

All times and dates use National Standard Time (UTC+8)

OC	Opening ceremony	●	Event competitions	1	Gold medal events	CC	Closing ceremony

May 2025		May														Events
May 2025		17th Sat	18th Sun	19th Mon	20th Tue	21st Wed	22nd Thu	23rd Fri	24th Sat	25th Sun	26th Mon	27th Tue	28th Wed	29th Thu	30th Fri	Events
Ceremonies		OC													CC	—N/a
Aquatics	Diving										●	●	●	●		
Aquatics	Open water										●					
Aquatics	Swimming		●	●	●	●	●	●								
Aquatics	Water polo							●	●	●	●	●	●	●		
Archery										●	●	●	●	●		
Athletics			●	●	●	●	●	●	●	●						
Badminton				●	17	●	2	54	●	20	●	●	39			132
Baseball			●	●	●	●	●	●	●	●	●	●	●			
Basketball	3×3 Basketball	●	●	●	●	●	●	●								
Basketball	Basketball							●	●	●	●	●	●	●		
Boules				●	●	●	●	●	●	●	●	●	●	●		
Canoeing	Sprint		●	●	●											
Canoeing	Slalom										●	●	●			
Canoeing	Canoe polo			●	●	●	●									
Canoeing	Dragon boat					●	●				●	●	●			
Canoeing	Marathon							●	●	●						
Cycling			●	●	●	●	●				●	●	●	●		
Dance												●	●	●		
Fencing			●	●	●	●	●									
Flying disc	Disc golf									●	●	●	●	●		
Flying disc	Ultimate		●	●	●	●	●	●	●							
Football		●	●	●	●	●	●	●		●	●	●	●	●	●	
Golf					●	●	●		●	●						
Handball			●	●	●	●	●	●	●							
Hockey					●	●	●	●	●	●	●	●	●			
Judo				●	●	●	●	●	●							
Karate										●	●	●	●	●		
Livesaving												●	●	●		
Orienteering	Middle distance										●	●				
Orienteering	Sprint						●	●								
Rowing								●	●	●	●	●	●			
Rugby				●	●	●	●	●	●	●	●	●				
Sailing	Sailing		●	●	●	●	●	●								
Sailing	Windsurfing			●	●	●	●	●								
Shooting				●	●	●	●	●	●	●	●	●	●			
Softball	Softball			●	●	●	●	●		●	●	●	●	●		
Softball	Slow Softball	●	●	●	●	●	●	●	●	●	●	●				
Squash			●	●	●	●	●	●	●	●	●	●				
Surfing				●	●	●	●	●	●	●						
Table tennis						●	●	●	●	●	●	●	●	●		
Taekwondo										●	●	●	●	●		
Tennis		●	●	●	10	3	6	●	2	13	●	●	●	2	10	46
Triathlon	Triathlon								●	●						
Triathlon	Aquathlon								●							
Tug of War			●	●	●		●	●	●							
Volleyball	Beach volleyball		●	●	●	●	●			●	●	●	●	●		
Volleyball	Indoor volleyball		●	●	●	●	●			●	●	●	●	●		
Weightlifting					●	●	●	●	●	●	●	●	●	●		
Demonstration sports
Gateball							●	●	●	●						
Woodball				●	●	●	●	●	●	●	●	●				
Daily medal events																
Cumulative total																
May 2025		17th Sat	18th Sun	19th Mon	20th Tue	21st Wed	22nd Thu	23rd Fri	24th Sat	25th Sun	26th Mon	27th Tue	28th Wed	29th Thu	30th Fri	Events
May 2025		May														Events

== See also ==
- World Masters Games
- List of sporting events in Taiwan
