= ECS G10IL =

Netbook computer released in 2008

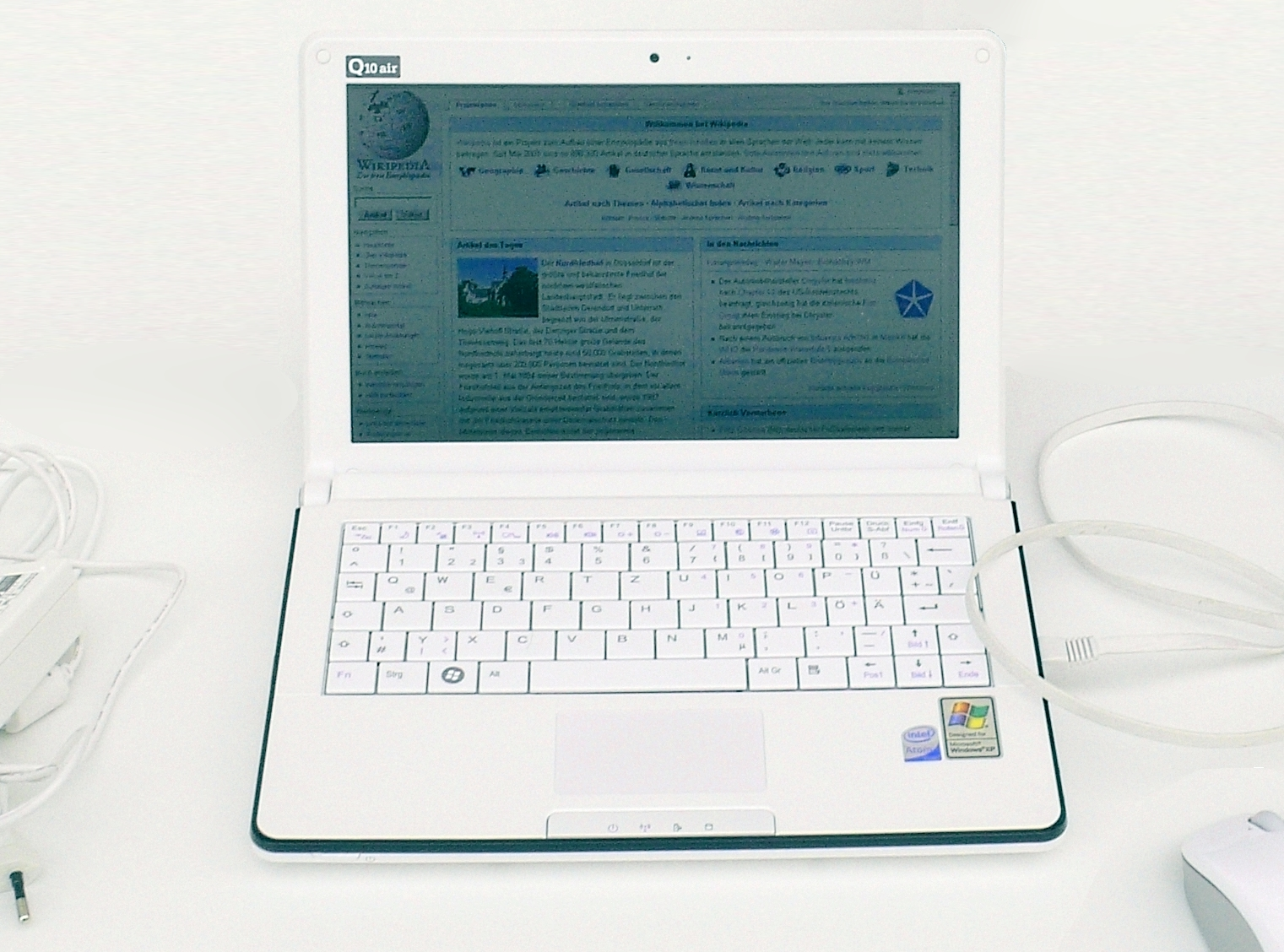
ECS G10IL XP Netbook with a built-in GSM (HSDPA) module (European use)

The ECS G10IL is a netbook computer designed by ECS. Using an Intel Atom N270 processor, it includes a built-in tri-band HSDPA and HSUPA, the "Super 3G". The notebook is available with Linux or Windows XP.

In line with other ECS laptop products, it is expected that most sales of this computer will be through OEM channels, rebadged with other brand names.

For example, the G10IL was released in the UK in September 2008 as the Advent 4213, fitted with a 160Gb hard disk, 1Gb RAM and Windows XP.

Other versions are:

- FTEC eBook G10 – Malaysia
- Airis – France
- Averatec Buddy – United States
- Q10 Air – Austria
- Elisa Miniläppäri – Finland

== Specifications ==
- CPU: Intel Atom N270 (a.k.a. "Diamondville")
- Chipset: Intel 945 GSE, ICH7M
- Operating System: Windows XP/Linux
- Memory: 1 slot SODIMM 200-pin DDR2 533/667, up to 2GB
- Screen: LCD Size 8.9" / 10.2" 1024 x 600 pixels
- Ports: 3x USB 2.0, Card Reader (SD, SDHC, MMC, MS), VGA out
- Webcam: 1.3 megapixel CCD
- Storage: HDD or SSD
- Battery: 4 / 6 cell
- Dimensions: 259 x 180 x 28.5 (mm)

== See also ==
- Comparison of netbooks
