= Luodong River =

River in Taiwan

Coordinates: 24°42′54″N 121°45′47″E

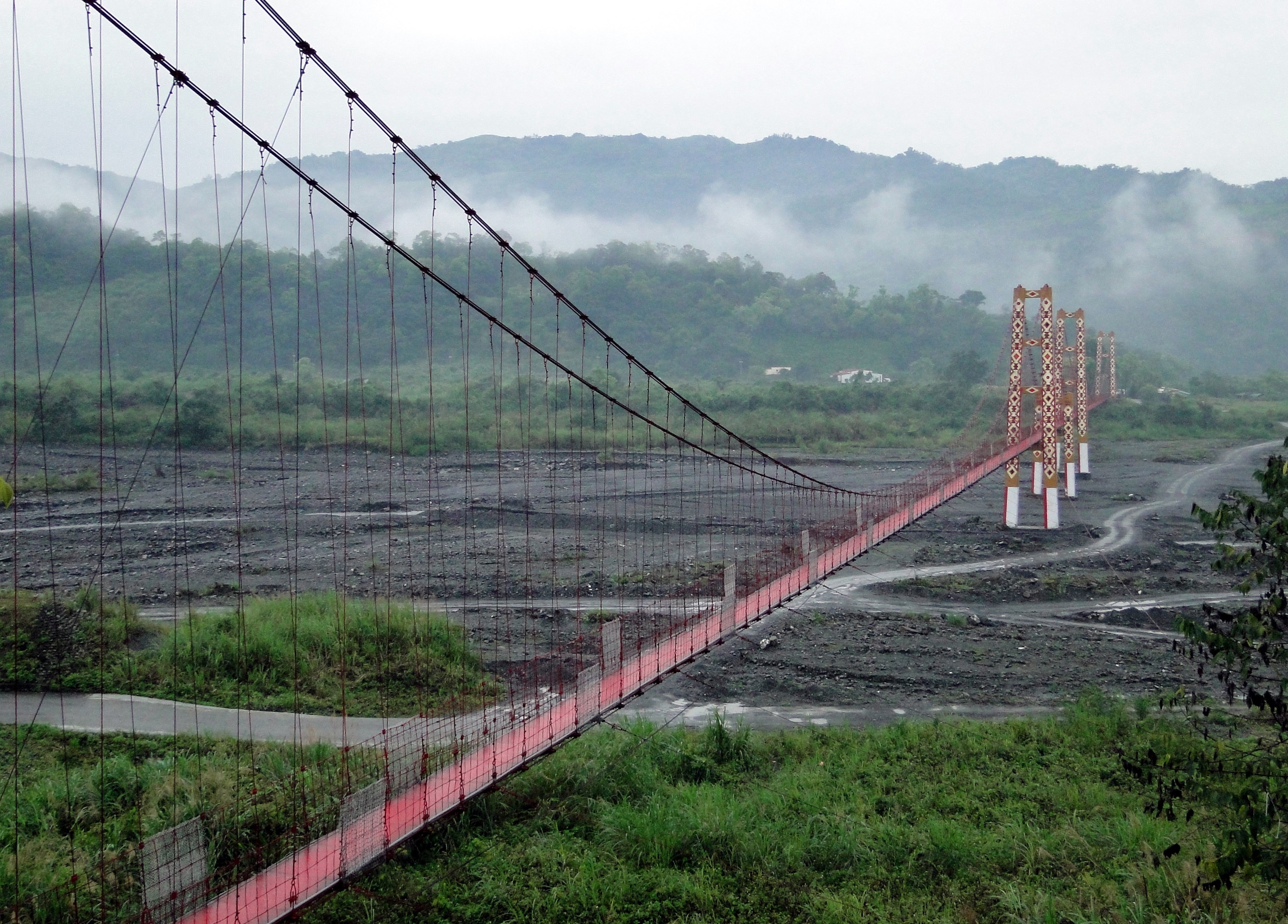
Hanxi Daqiao Bridge on Lotung River, Datong Township, Yilan County, Taiwan

Luodong River（Traditional Chinese：羅東溪 ） is the largest tributary on the south bank of Lanyang River. Its upstream section is also called Han River, and the midstream section is known as Guangxing River. It originates from the northeastern slope of Dayuan Mountain and flows through Datong Township, Dongshan Township, Sanxing Township, and Luodong Township in Yilan County, serving as the boundary river between Sanxing Township and Dongshan Township.

Luodong River has tributaries including Fansheken River (also known as Gulu River, originating from Fansheken Mountain), Dagou River (originating from Wumao Mountain), Annong River, and Dakeng River (originating from Dahutong Mountain). Fansheken River and Dagou River converge near Sifanglin, while Annong River and Dakeng River converge near Alishi. These tributaries join the main stream of Luodong River near Lupucheng, and the main stream flows into Lanyang River before the Lanyang Bridge.
