= Kris Yao =

Taiwanese architect

Kris Yao 姚仁喜
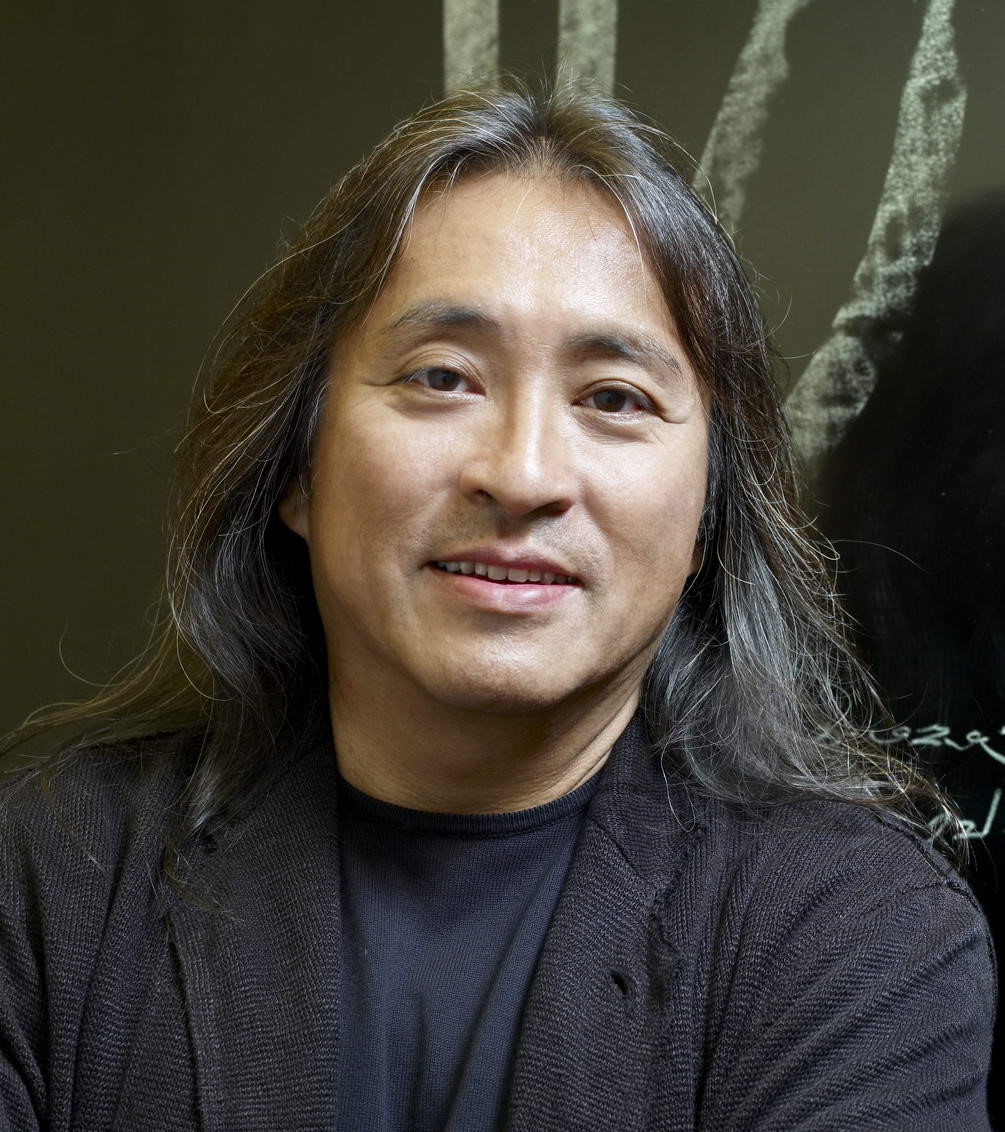
- Born: December 1951 (age 74); Taipei, Taiwan
- Education: Tunghai University (BArch); University of California, Berkeley (MArch)
- Occupation: Architect
- Awards: 2014 Honorary Fellowship of the American Institute of Architects; 2011 Special Contribution for National Development and Property Construction Award 2009 Architect Registration, Republic Of China (The National Administration Board Of Architect Registration); 2007 The 11th Annual National Award for Arts; 2005 Distinguished Alumnus Award, College of Environmental Design, U.C. Berkeley 1997 The 3rd Annual Chinese Outstanding Architect Award, Republic of China
- Buildings: THSR Hsinchu Station Lanyang Museum; Wuzhen Theaters; Water-Moon Monastery; Shih Chien University Gymnasium and Library; China Steel Corporation headquarters Kelti Center
- Website: http://www.krisyaoartech.com

Kris Yao (Chinese: 姚仁喜; pinyin: Yáo Rénxǐ; born December 1951) is a Taiwanese architect, and the founder and head architect at KRIS YAO | ARTECH in Taipei and Shanghai.

== Biography ==
Yao was born and raised in Taipei, Taiwan. Yao earned his Bachelor of Architecture (B.Arch.) from Tunghai University in 1975 and earned his Master of Architecture (M.Arch.) from the University of California, Berkeley, in 1978.

== Kris Yao | Artech ==
Established by Kris Yao in 1985, KRIS YAO | ARTECH is an architectural firm composed of more than 160 professionals with offices in Taipei and Shanghai. The firm's projects are mainly located in the Greater China area, but are also found in the United States, Europe, and South Asia. Project categories range from corporate, residential, cultural, educational, hospital, commercial, transportation, industrial architecture design, and urban planning, etc. The award-winning and selected works including: Lanyang Museum, China Steel Corporation Headquarters, Water-Moon Monastery, and Wuzhen Theater, etc.

== Selected projects ==
- Taiwan High Speed Rail
  - Hsinchu Station (Hsinchu)
  - Changhua Station (Changhua)
  - Yunlin Station (Yunlin)
- Lanyang Museum (Yilan)
- Southern Branch of the National Palace Museum (Chiayi)
- Museum of Archaeology, Tainan Branch of National Museum of Prehistory (Tainan)
- Water-Moon Monastery (Taipei City)
- Lite-On Technology Center (Taipei City)
- Shih Chien University Gymnasium and Library (Taipei City)
- China Steel Corporation Headquarters (Kaohsiung City)
- Kelti Group Headquarters (Taipei City)
- Far Eastern Mega Tower (New Taipei City)
- Cathay Landmark, (Taipei City)
- United Daily News Office Building (Taipei City)
- Wuzhen Theater (Zhejiang, China)
- New Taipei Museum of Arts (New Taipei City)
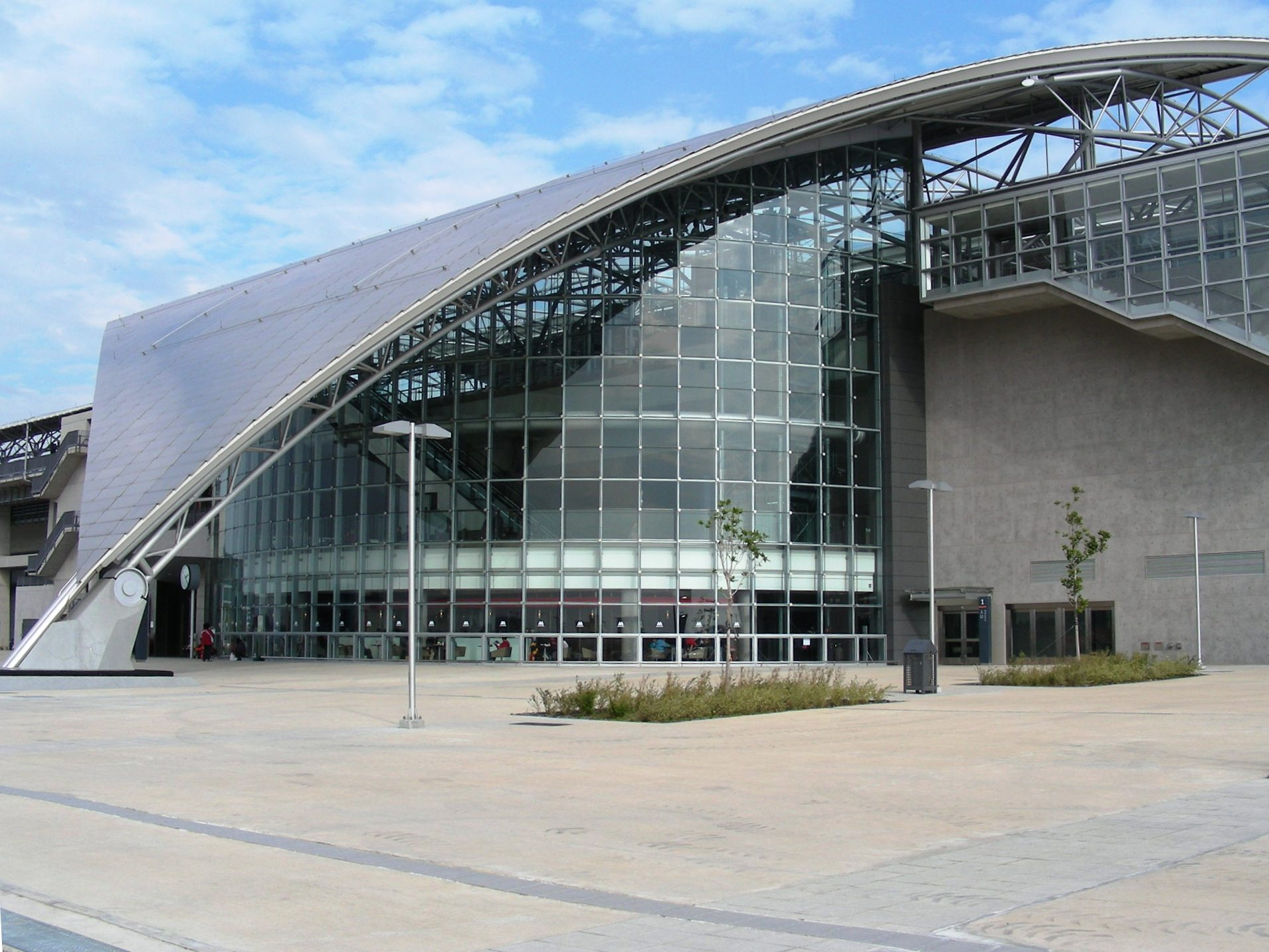
THSR Hsinchu Station

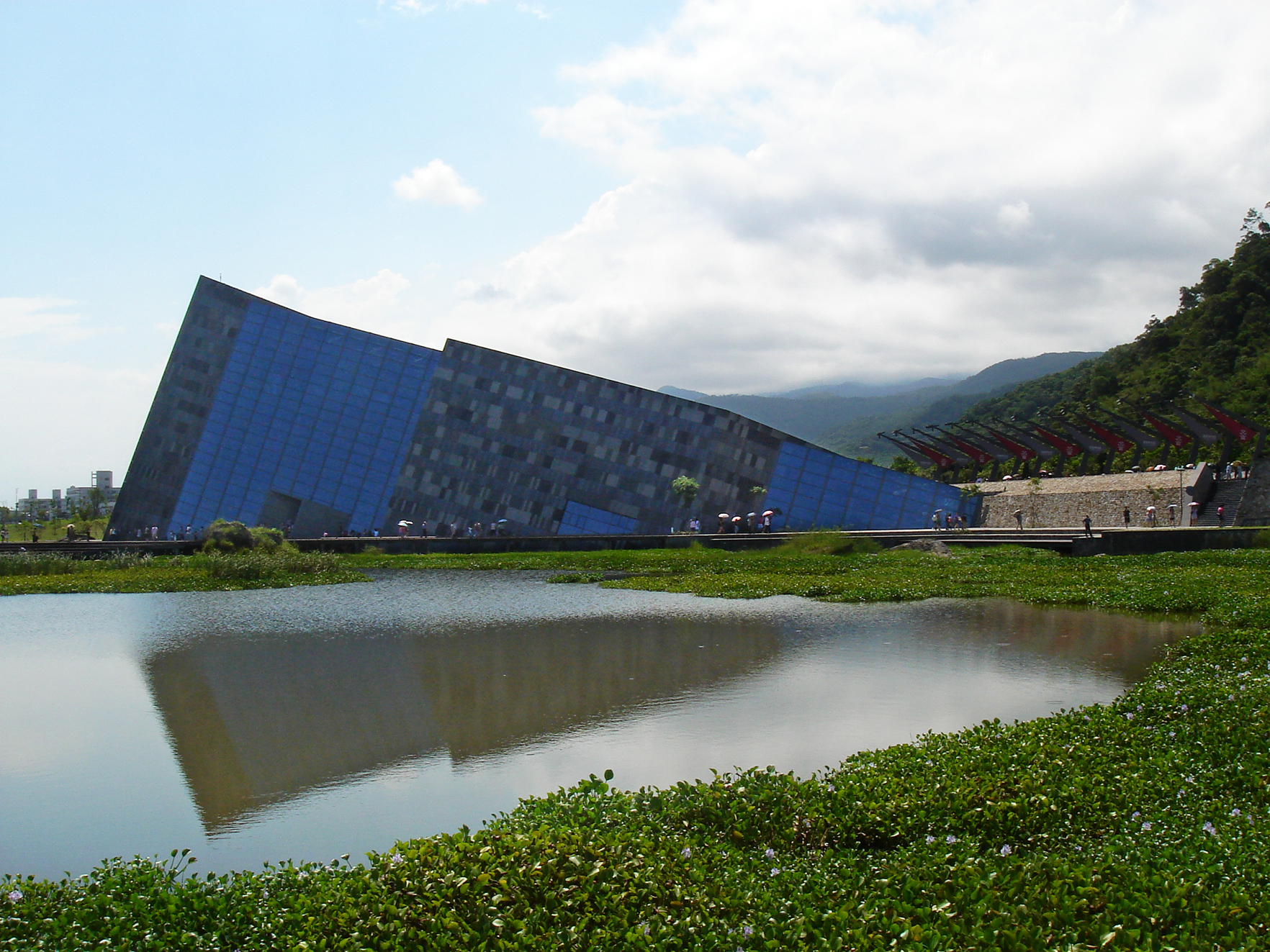
Lanyang Museum

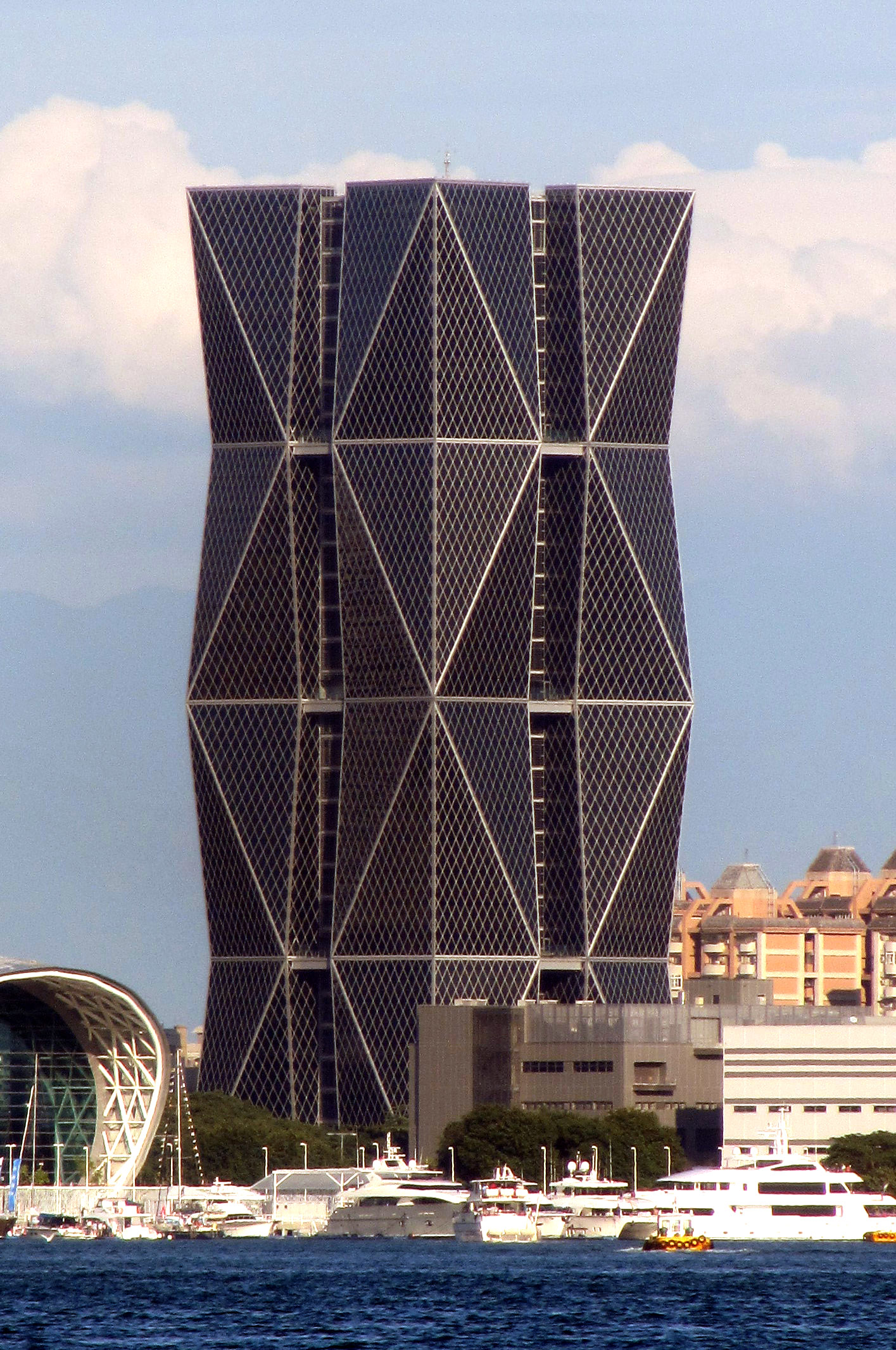
China Steel Corp. HQ.

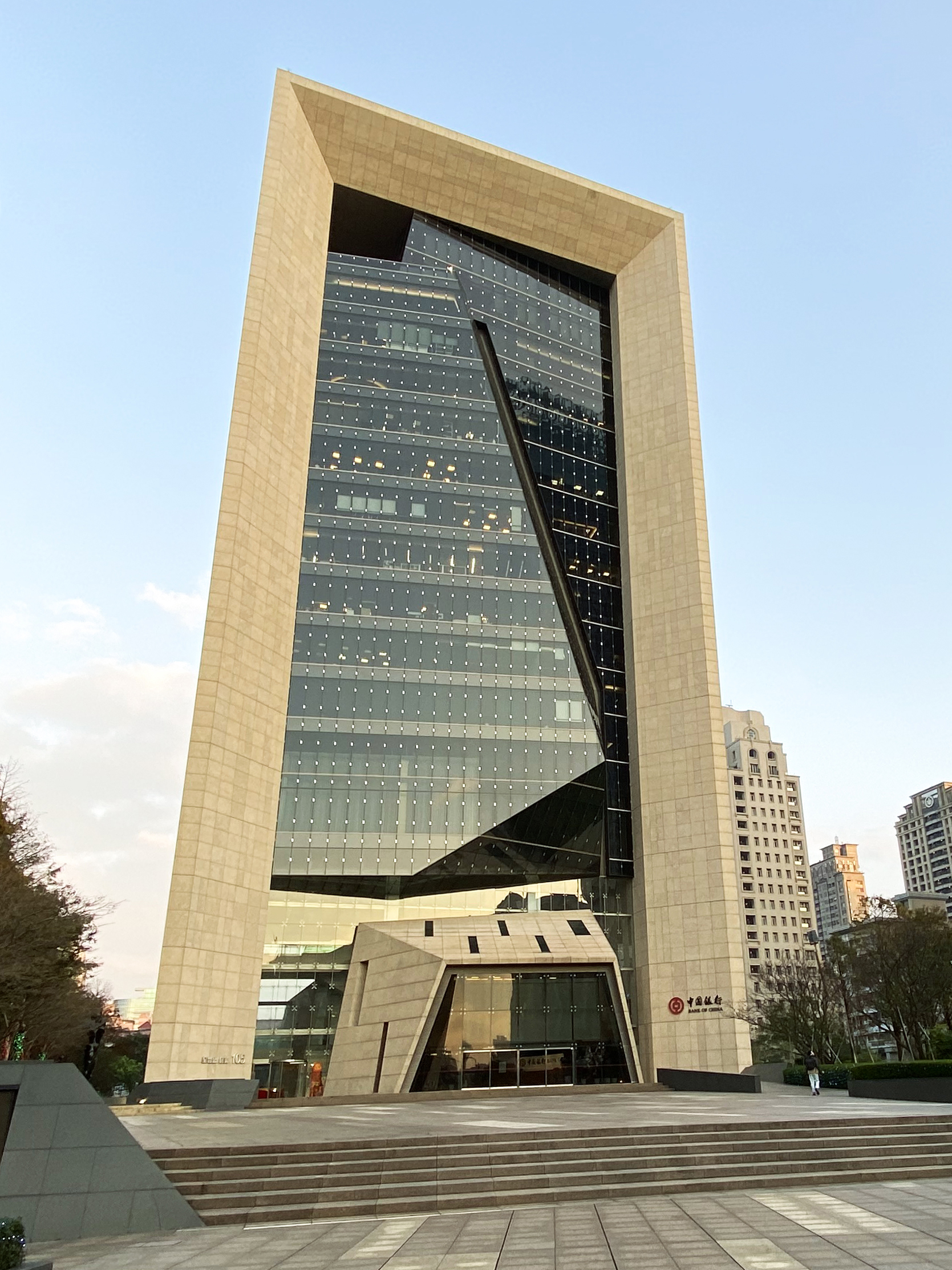
Kelti Group Headquarters

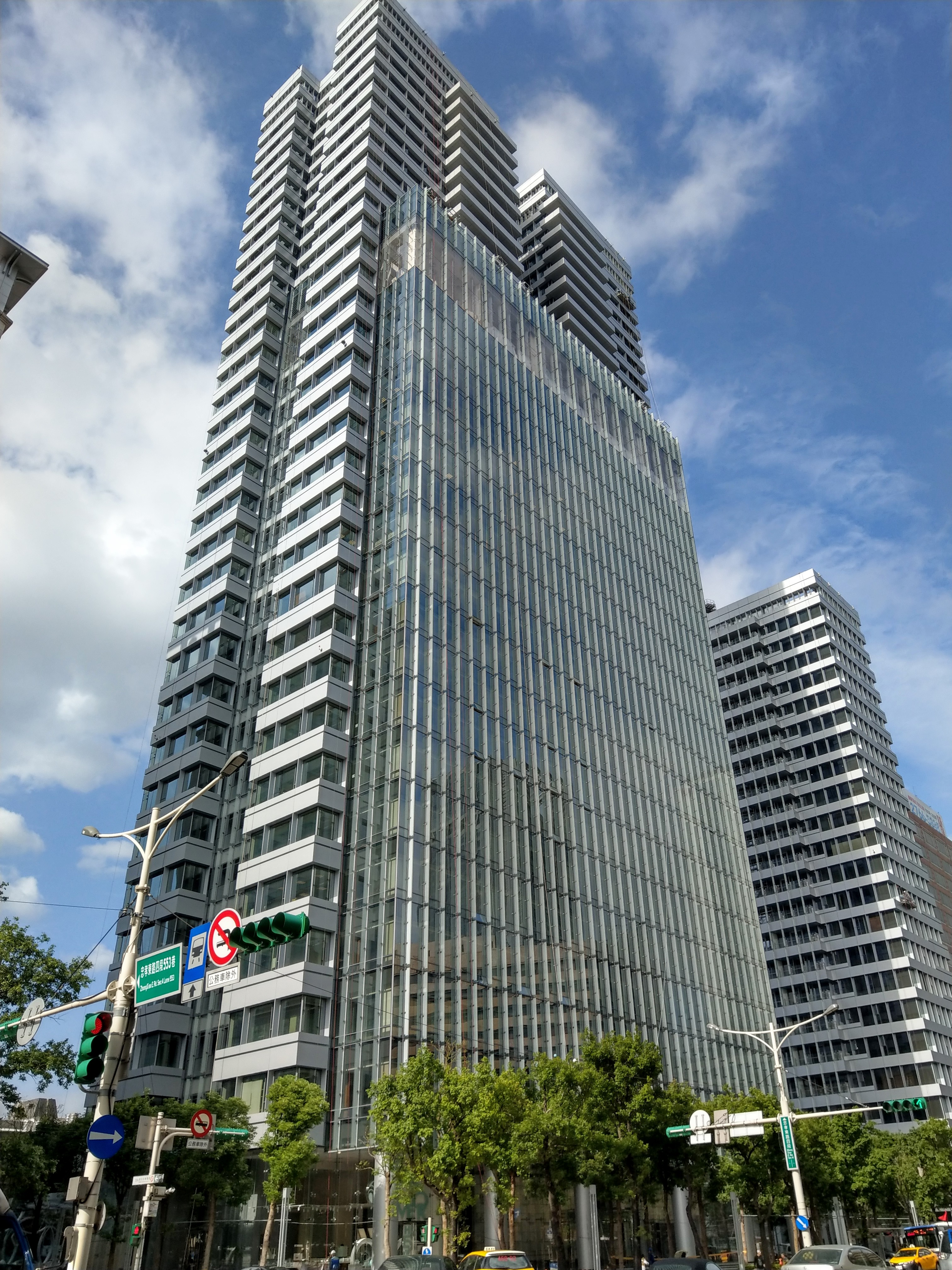
UDN Building

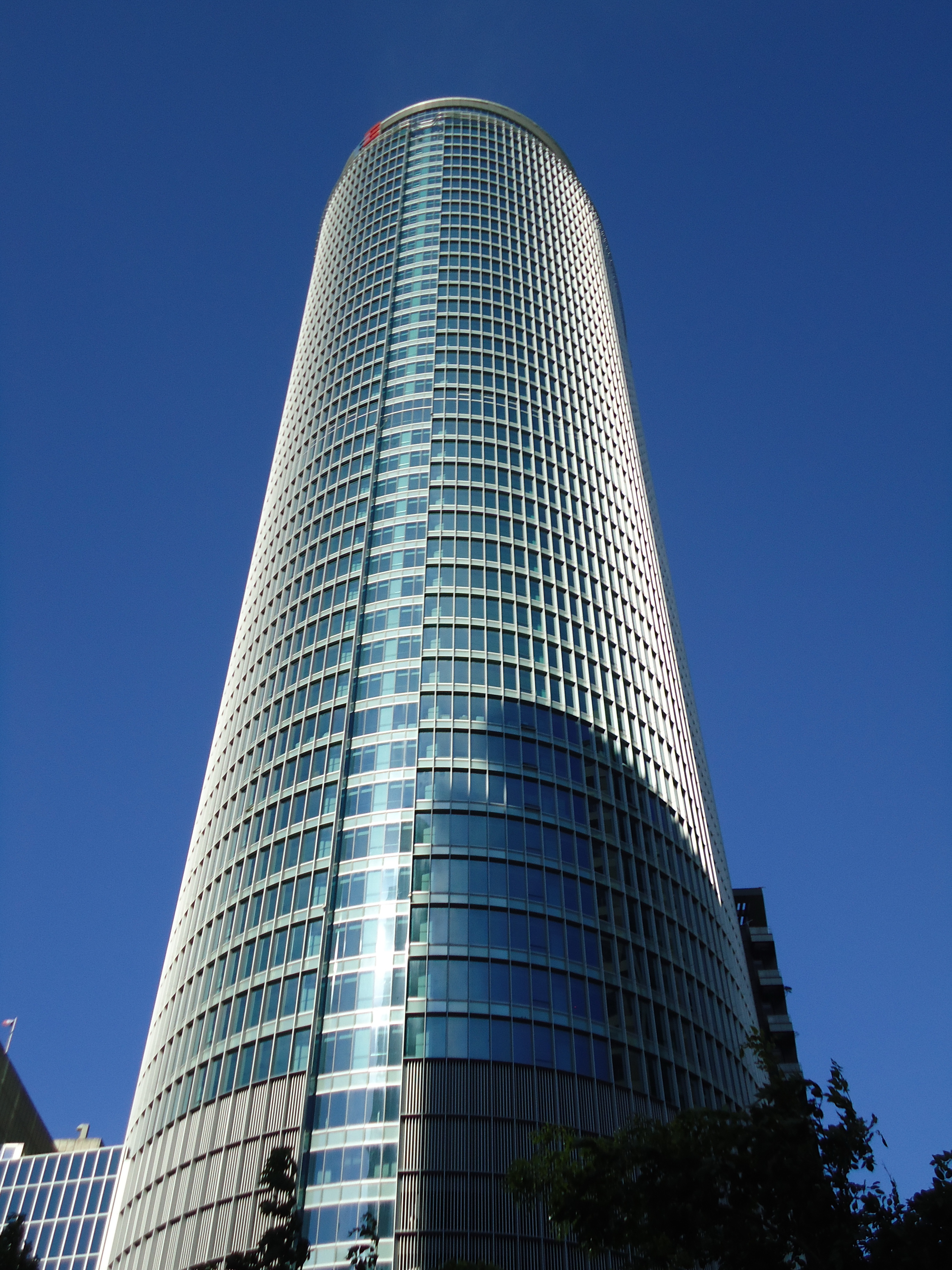
Far Eastern Mega Tower

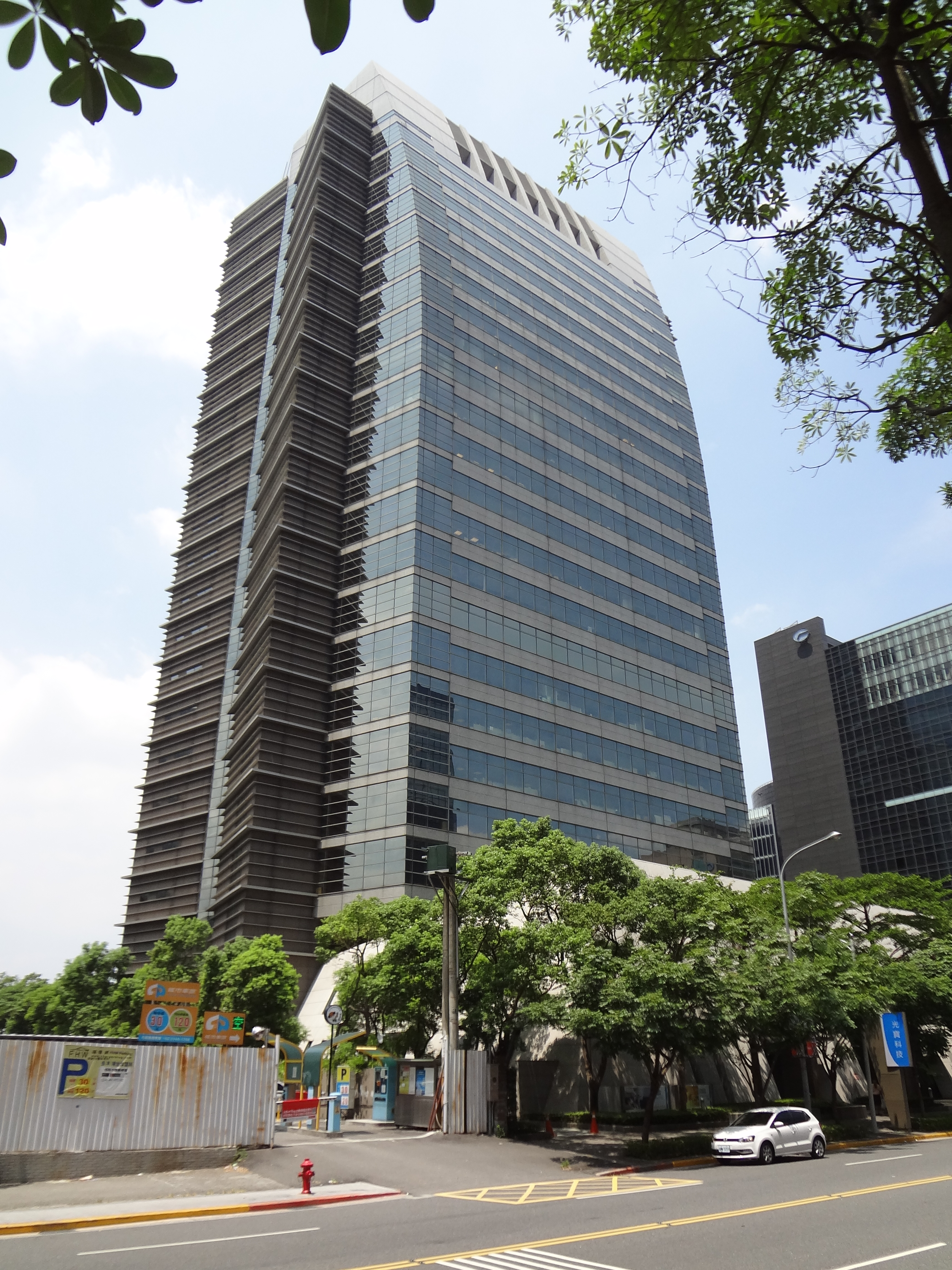
Lite-On Technology Center

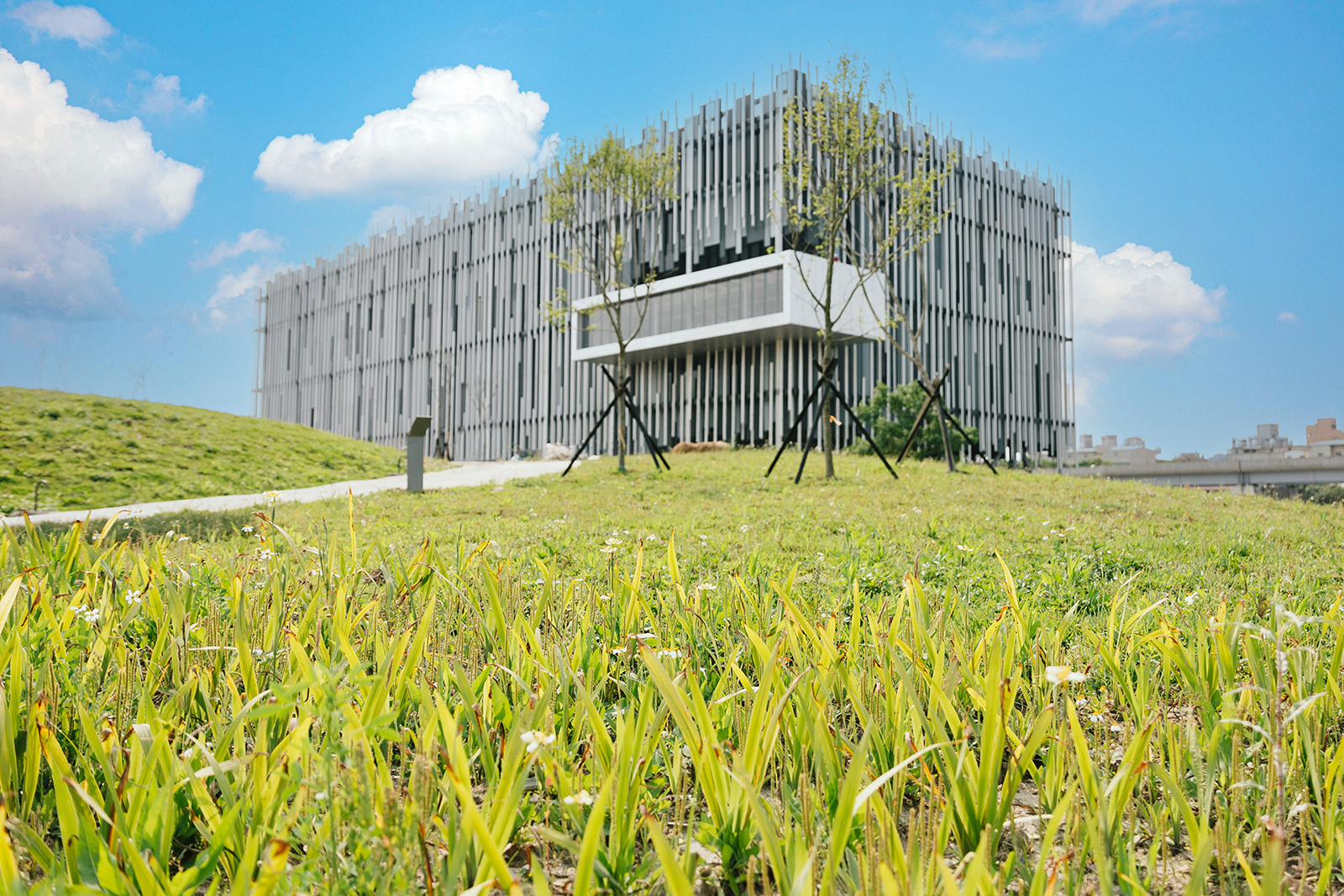
New Taipei Museum of Arts

== Recognition ==
In 2014, Yao received an Honorary Fellowship of the American Institute of Architects (Hon. FAIA). In 2003, Yao represented Taiwan in the 8th International Architecture Exhibition at Venice Biennale of Architecture (La Biennale di Venezia), in Venice, Italy. Yao was reinvited to the same event in 2008, at the 11th International Architecture Exhibition at La Biennale di Venezia. In 2004, Yao was invited to present his project, the THSR Hsinchu Station, at the 1st International Architecture Biennale in Rotterdam, the Netherlands. In the same year, he was also invited to present his projects at the 1st International Architecture Biennale in Beijing, China. In 2005, Yao was named a recipient of the Distinguished Alumni of the College of Environmental Design at the University of California, Berkeley. In 2013, Palace Museum, Southern Branch was anticipated in The International Architecture Showcase, London Festival of Architecture 2013 – Atlas of the Unbuilt World in London, UK. In 2014, Yao was re-invited to the 14th La Biennale di Venezia–Collateral Event / Time Space Existence –The Ninth Column.

In 1997, Kris Yao was awarded the "Chinese Outstanding Architect Award". In 2007, Yao received the "Taiwan National Award for Arts and Architecture", the highest honor in cultural and art disciplines in Taiwan. Yao is also collaborating with architect Rem Koolhaas in the design of the Taipei Performing Arts Center, scheduled for completion in 2015.

== Awards ==
- 2014 8th Far Eastern Architectural Design Award - Honorable Mention & Most Popular Award - Water-Moon Monastery
- 2014 Honorary Fellowship of the American Institute of Architects
- 2013 35th Taiwan Architecture Award - Water-Moon Monastery
- 2013 WAF Award shortlisted – Religion - Water-Moon Monastery
- 2013 WAF Award shortlisted – Culture – Wuzhen Theater
- 2013 1ST Architizer A+ Awards: Jury Winner And Popular Choice Winner -China Steel Corporation Headquarters
- 2012 The Chicago Athenaeum Museum Of Architecture And Design, The European Centre of Architecture Art Design And Urban Studies:The International Architecture Award - Lanyang Museum
- 2012 Perspective Awards 2012 Certificate Of Excellence In Heritage Category -Langyang Museum
