= ASRock =

Taiwanese manufacturer of PCs and PC hardware

ASRock Inc.

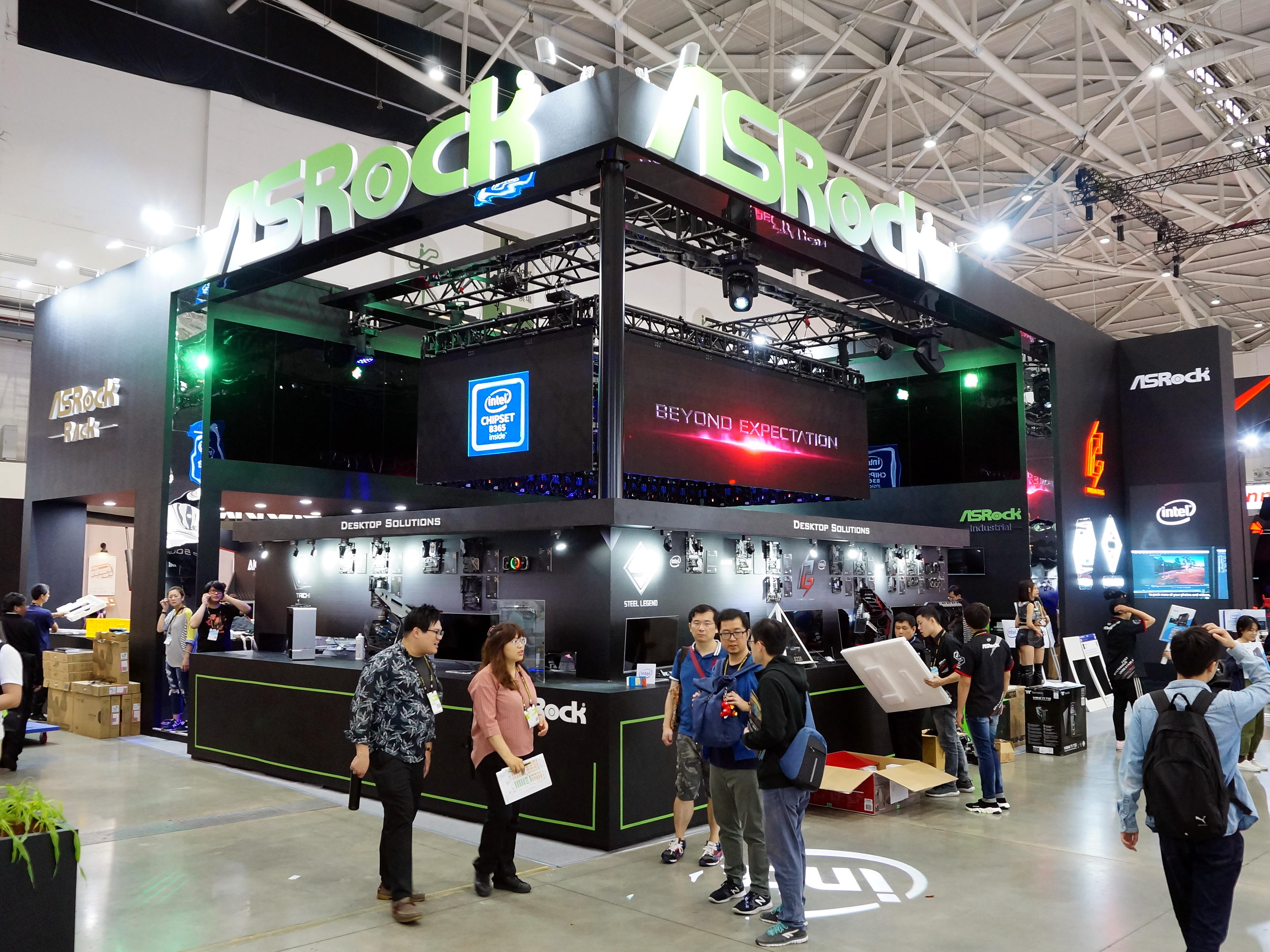
- Computex Taipei 2019, ASRock booth
- Type: Public
- Traded as: TWSE: 3515
- Industry: Computer hardware
- Founded: 10 May 2002; 24 years ago
- Founder: Ted Hsu (徐世昌)
- Headquarters: Taipei, Taiwan
- Area served: Worldwide
- Key people: Tong Syu-tian (chairman); Syu Long-lun (CEO)
- Products: Motherboards; Video cards; HTPCs; Industrial PCs
- Revenue: ▲NT$17.91 Billion / $640.71 Million (2020)
- Operating income: ▲NT$1.86 Billion / $66.46 Million (2020)
- Net income: ▲NT$1.51 Billion / $53.98 Million (2020)
- Total equity: ▲NT$7.31 Billion / $261.41 Million (2020)
- Owner: Pegatron
- Number of employees: 322 (2023)

Chinese name
- Chinese: 華擎科技股份有限公司
Transcriptions
Standard Mandarin
- Hanyu Pinyin: Huáqíng Kējì Gǔfèn Yǒuxiàn Gōngsī
- Tongyong Pinyin: Huácíng Kejì Gǔfèn Yǒusiàn Gongsih

ASRock
- Chinese: 華擎
- Literal meaning: Magnificent engine
Transcriptions
Standard Mandarin
- Hanyu Pinyin: Huáqíng
- Tongyong Pinyin: Huácíng
- Website: www.asrock.com

ASRock Inc. (Chinese: 華擎科技股份有限公司; pinyin: Huáqíng Kējì Gǔfèn Yǒuxiàn Gōngsī) is a Taiwanese manufacturer of motherboards, industrial PCs and home theater PCs (HTPC).

Established in 2002, it is owned by Pegatron, a subsidiary of the Asus group. As of 2011, ASRock is the world's third largest motherboard manufacturer.

== History ==
Former ASRock logo (2002-2009)

ASRock was originally spun off from Asus in 2002 by Ted Hsu (co-founder of the mentioned company), in order to compete with companies like Foxconn for the commodity OEM market. Since then ASRock has also gained momentum in the DIY sector with plans for moving the company upstream beginning in 2007 following a successful IPO on the Taiwan Stock Exchange. In 2010 it was acquired by Pegatron, a company part of the Asus group.

ASRock established itself as a server motherboard affiliate in April 2013, having received orders from 10 mid-size clients for server and industrial PC motherboards and forming partnerships with system integrators.

== Products and services ==
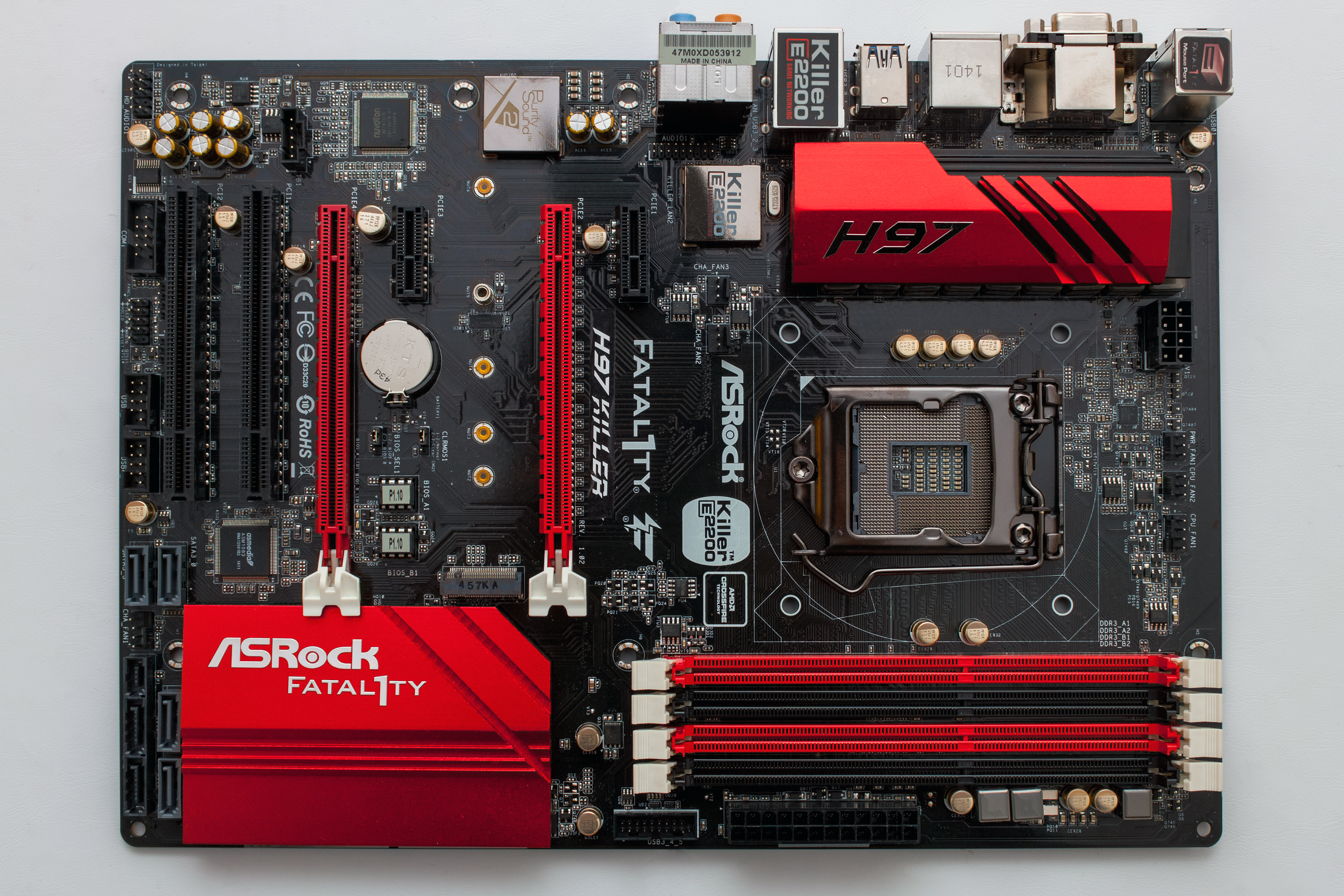
An ASRock H97 brand motherboard

Besides motherboards, ASRock also sells desktop mini PCs. Three ASRock products were short-listed for the 2012 Taiwan Brand Award for the first time, and then became endorsed products of the External Trade Development Council when it was promoting the quality image of Taiwan brands globally. In 2012, ASRock stepped into the industrial PC and server motherboard market. ASRock began developing graphics cards in partnership with AMD in 2018 as a result of the surge in cryptocurrency mining.

== Market coverage ==
ASRock is the world's third-largest motherboard brand and the distribution channels cover electronics stores, PC stores, gadget retailers, and online shops. Major sales regions in 2011 included Europe for 37.68%, Central and South America accounted for 21.13%, the Asia Pacific region accounted for 40.95% and other markets accounted for only 0.24%. As a whole, ASRock accounted for a large proportion of sales in Asia and Europe in terms of overall performance.

The Top 3 Motherboard Brand

- Korea: ASRock is the No.1 brand according to the Korea motherboard market share analysis in June 2012 (61% market share).
- Japan: ASRock ranked No.2 in Japan.

== Market share overview ==
According to the annual report for Digitimes 2011, ASRock has been growing very fast in the past few years. ASRock has been one of the top 3 motherboard brands for 2 consecutive years.

Taiwan-based branded motherboards: Shipments 2011–2012 (m units)
Company	2011 shipments	2012 shipments
Asus	23.2	22.2
Gigabyte	17	18.5–19
ASRock	7.8	8
MSI	7	6
Biostar	5	4.5
ECS	5	4.5

(Note: MSI and ECS' OEM shipments are not included in the figures. Source: Companies and market watchers, compiled by Digitimes, November 2012)

== Reception ==
ASRock received a Tom's Hardware 2012 Recommended Buy Award for its X79 Extreme4 motherboard, and also won the Xbit labs 2012 Editor Recommended Award with Z77 Extreme4. Furthermore, ASRock Z68 Extreme7 Gen3, Fatal1ty Z68 Professional Gen3 and the mini PC series was awarded three 2011 Taiwan Brand Awards.

ASRock is also the first and only manufacturer of a Mini ITX-sized X99 chipset-based motherboard, the X99E-ITX/ac. It supports Haswell-E and Broadwell-E Intel Core i7 and Haswell-EP Intel Xeon CPUs with CPU core support up to 18 cores.

=== Ryzen 9000 CPU failures on AM5 motherboards ===
As at 26 February 2025, numerous user reports of Ryzen 9000 series CPUs failing prematurely had surfaced on the internet, with the majority of the cases occurring on ASRock motherboards. On 28 May 2025, according to a conversation with YouTuber Tech Yes City, the company acknowledged reports of the CPU failures and attributed it to Precision Boost Overdrive (PBO) presets being set "too aggressively" in the motherboard's BIOS, after previously warning of the reports linking the CPU failures to ASRock motherboards as being "misinformation".

On 28 August 2025, ASRock published BIOS update 3.40 for its AM5 motherboards, which claims to address "CPU operating stability". User reports of CPU failures had continued to emerge with previous BIOS updates such as 3.20 and 3.25, which were believed to address several possible causes of the CPU failures.

== See also ==
- List of companies of Taiwan
- Elitegroup Computer Systems (ECS)
