= United Daily News Office Building =

Skyscraper in Xinyi, Taipei, Taiwan

United Daily News Office Building 聯合報辦公大樓
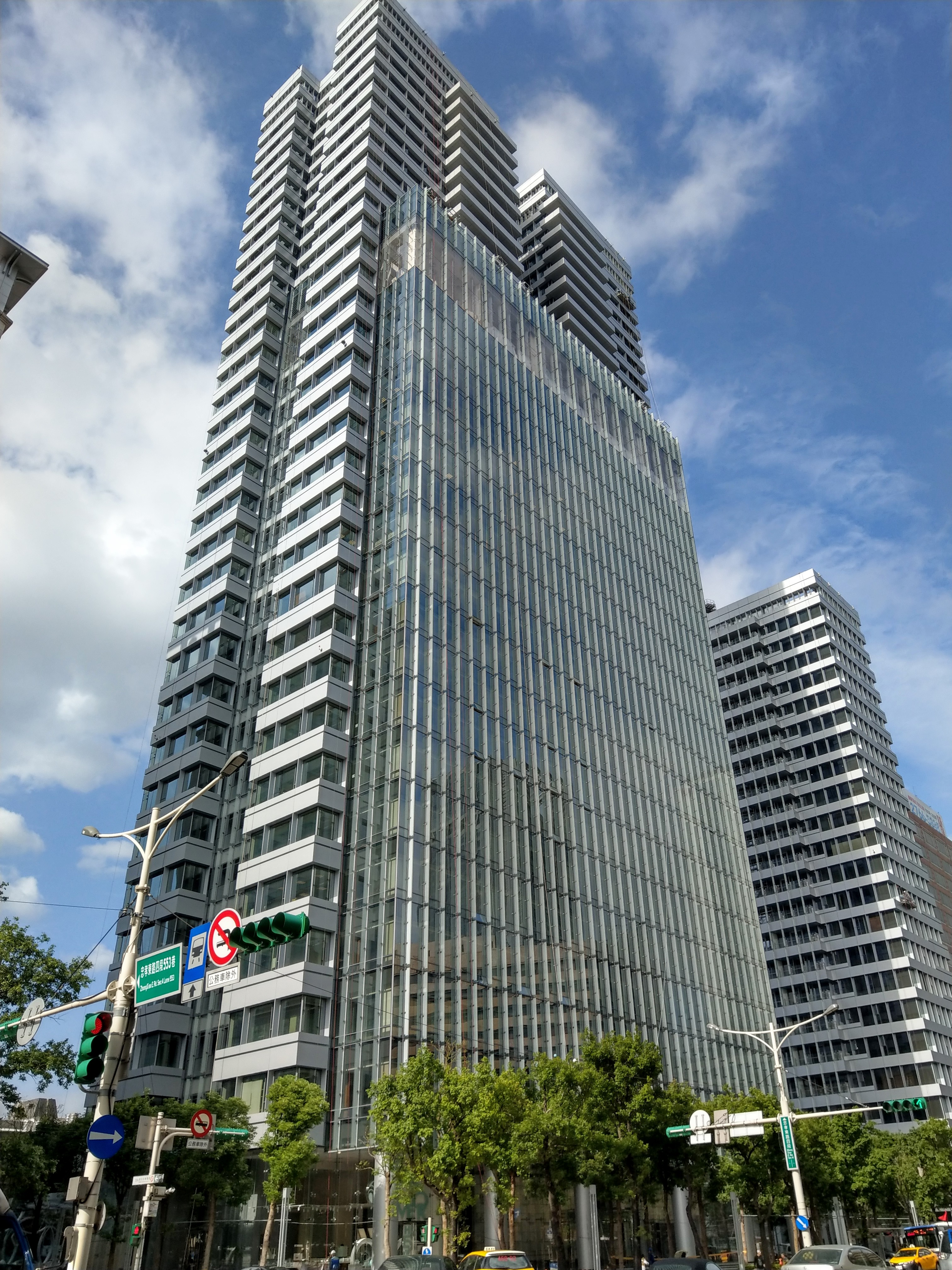
- Interactive map of the United Daily News Office Building 聯合報辦公大樓 area

General information
- Status: Completed
- Type: Office
- Location: No. 555, Section 4, Zhongxiao East Road, Xinyi District, Taipei, Taiwan
- Coordinates: 25°2′29.68″N 121°33′47.34″E
- Construction started: 2015
- Completed: 2018

Height
- Architectural: 145.6 m (478 ft)

Technical details
- Floor count: 34
- Floor area: 60,147.43 m^{2} (647,421.5 sq ft)

Design and construction
- Architect: Kris Yao

The United Daily News Office Building, also known as UDN Building (Chinese: 聯合報辦公大樓; pinyin: Lián Hé Bào Bàngōng Dàlóu), is a mixed-used skyscraper building located in Xinyi District, Taipei, Taiwan. The building was completed in 2018, with a total floor area of 60,147.43 m^{2} (647,421.5 sq ft) and a height of 145.6 m (478 ft) that comprise 34 floors above ground, as well as 5 basement levels. It houses the corporate headquarters of United Daily News. The 1st to 20th floors of the building are offices whilst the 21st to 34th floors are used for residential apartment units.

== Design ==
The building was designed by the Taiwanese architect Kris Yao and inspired by the Daily News Building in New York City. The building's design adopts a futuristic sensation by utilising aluminum claddings as well as a glass façade. The 8-meter high office lobby is presented like a public gallery space, with sculptures of Chinese-calligraphy symbols on the walls.

=== Gallery ===
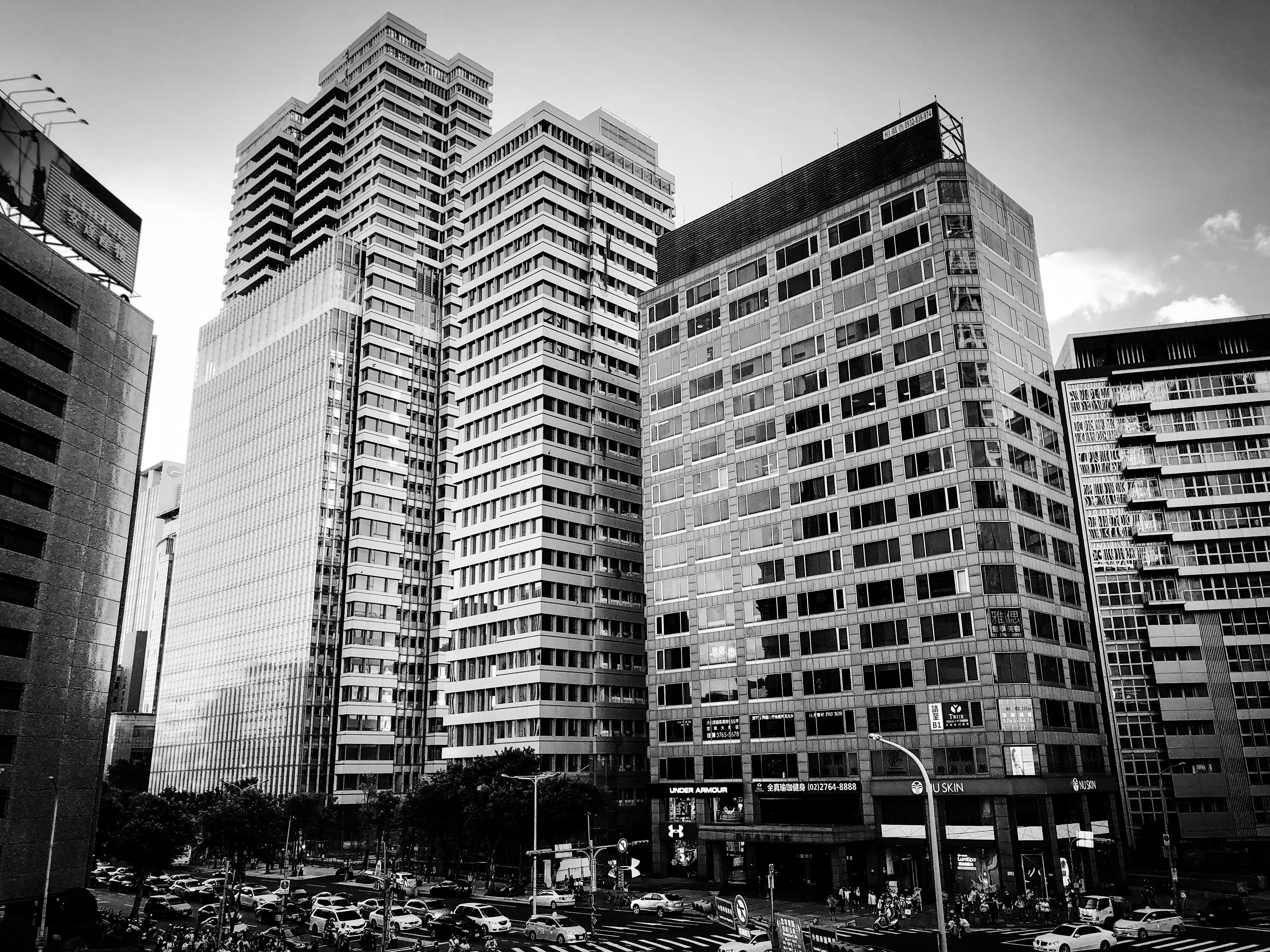
UDN Building as seen from Zhongxiao East Road

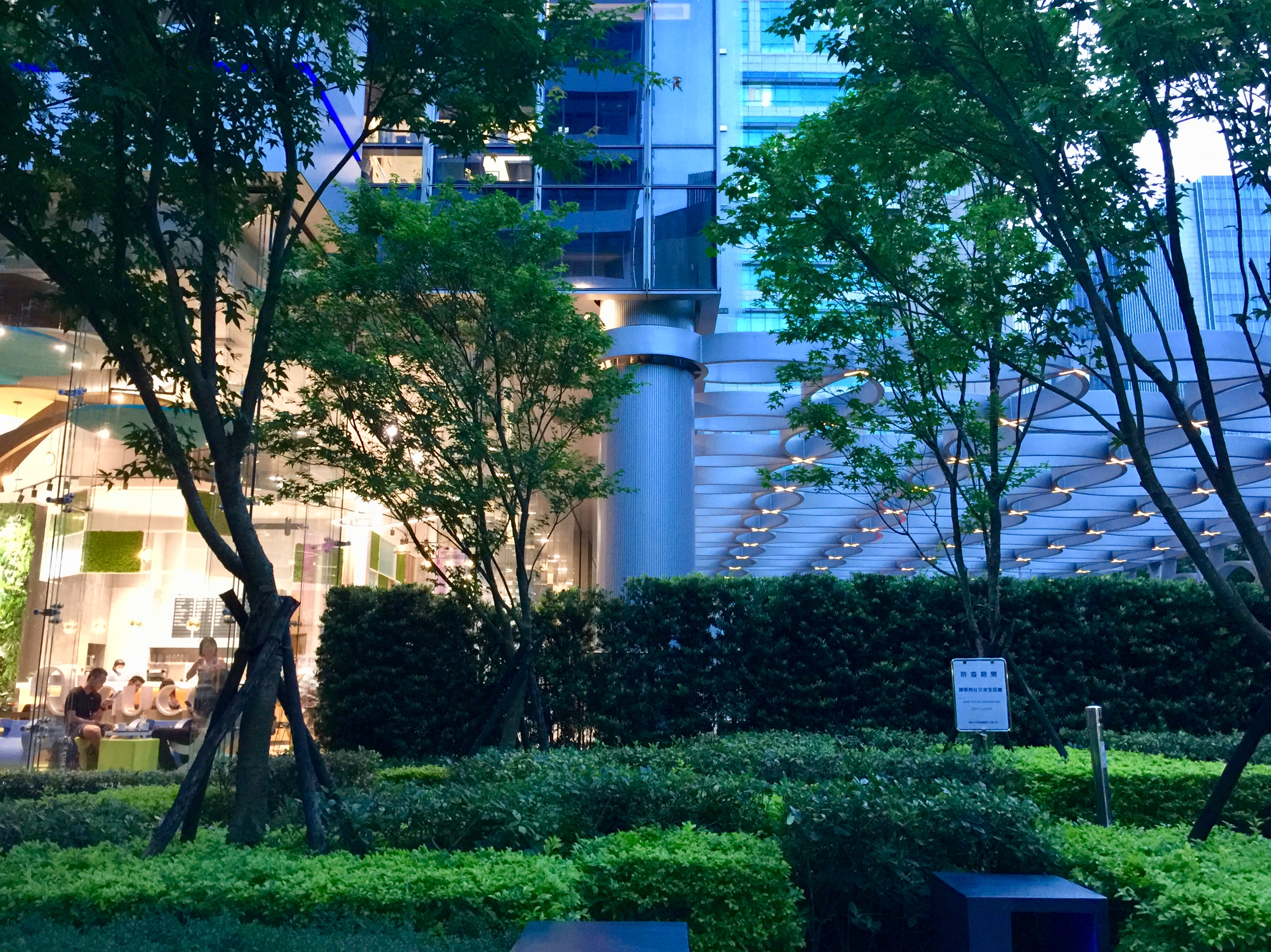
Entrance

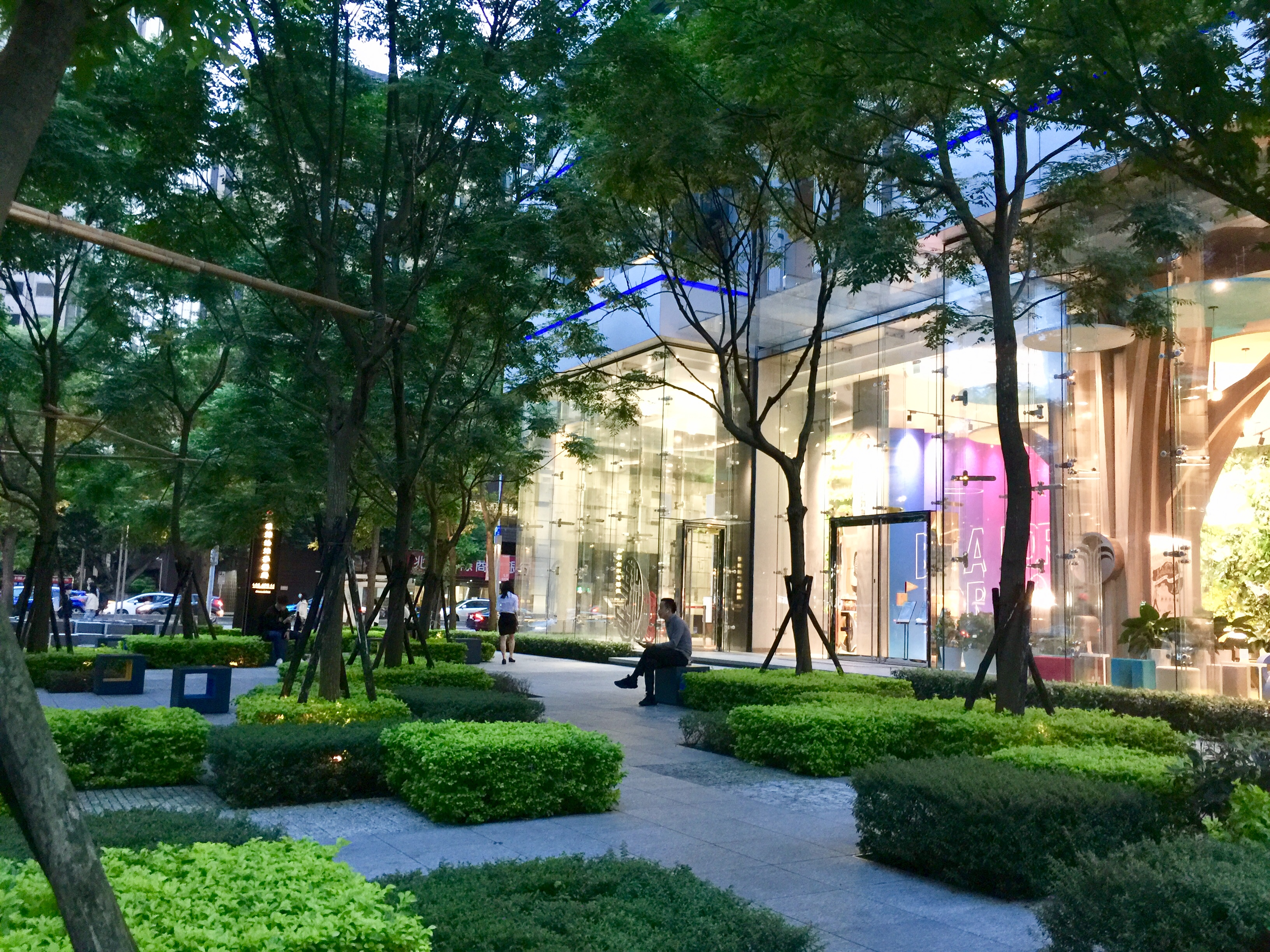
Entrance garden

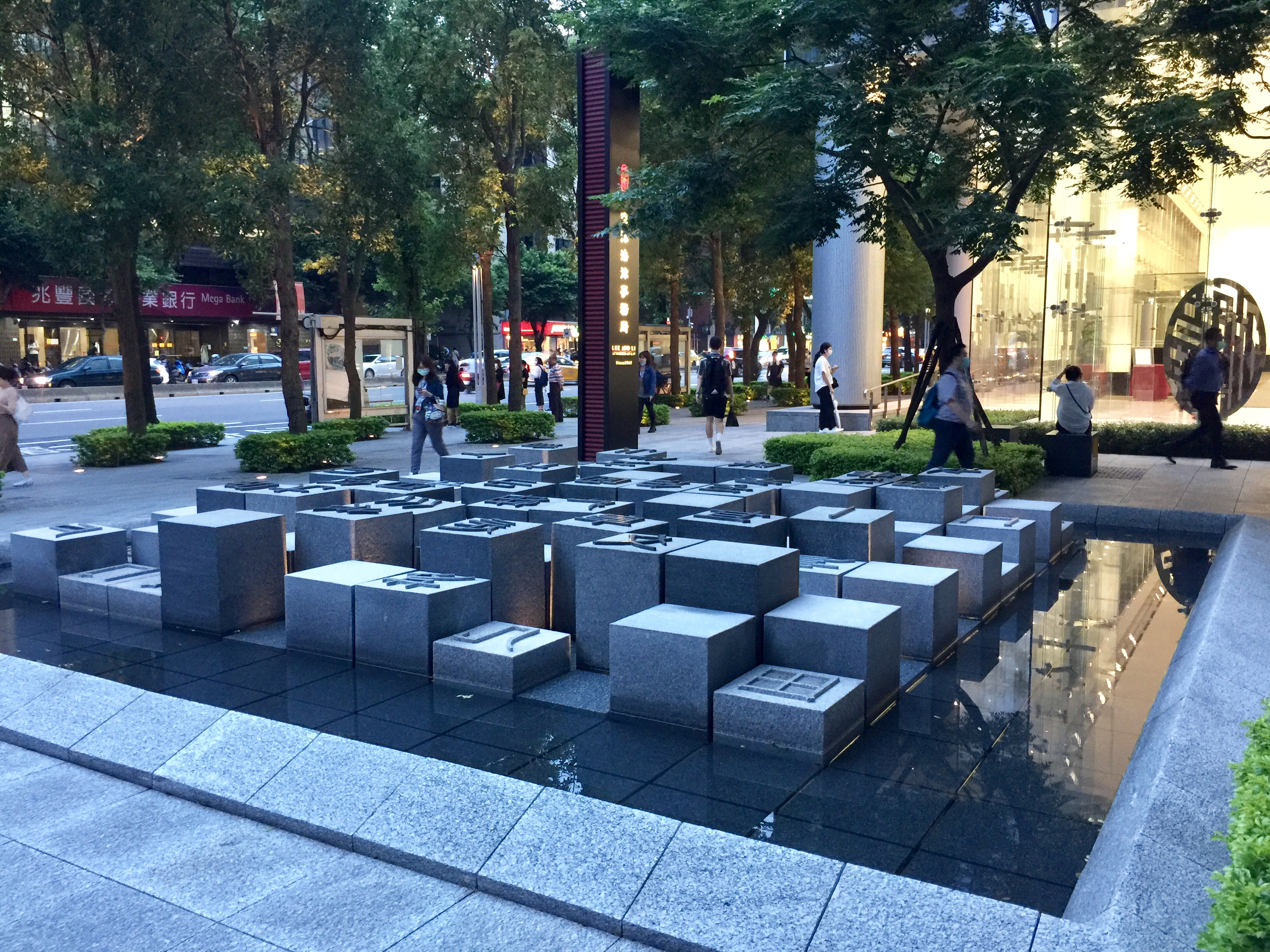
Entrance fountain

== See also ==
- List of tallest buildings in Taiwan
- List of tallest buildings in Taipei
- United Daily News
