= Lite-On Technology Center =

Skyscraper office building in Neihu District, Taipei, Taiwan

Lite-On Technology Center 光寶科技大樓
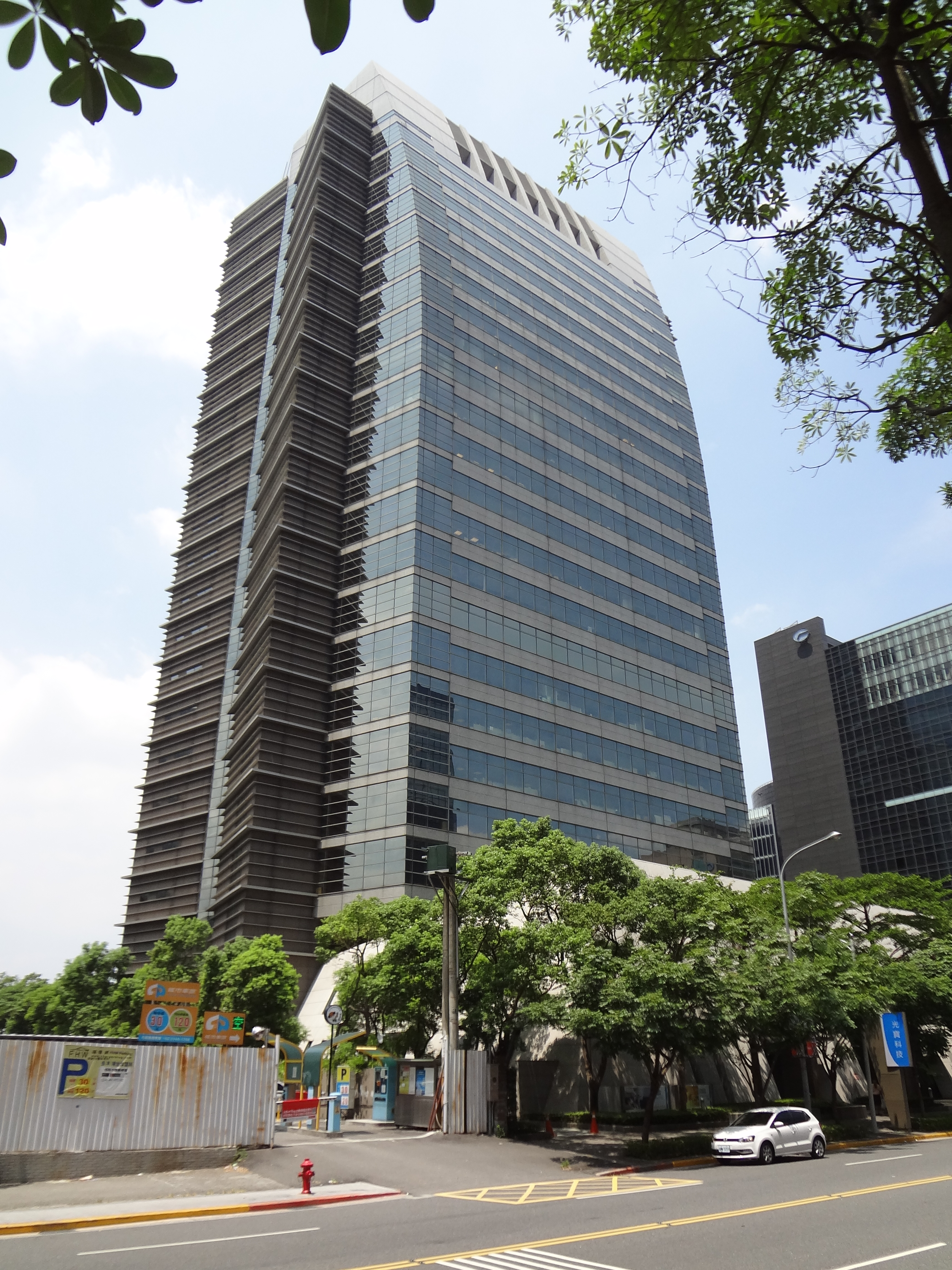
- Interactive map of the Lite-On Technology Center 光寶科技大樓 area

General information
- Status: Completed
- Type: Office building
- Classification: Office
- Location: No. 392, Ruiguang Road, Neihu District, Taipei, Taiwan
- Coordinates: 25.078192156508855°N 121.57106343289003°E
- Completed: 2002

Height
- Roof: 107 m (351 ft)

Technical details
- Floor count: 23
- Floor area: 69,775 m^{2} (751,050 sq ft)

The Lite-On Technology Center (Chinese: 光寶科技大樓) is a 23-storey, 107 m (351 ft) skyscraper office building completed in 2002 and located in Neihu District, Taipei, Taiwan. The building consists of four basement levels, with a total floor area of 69,775 m^{2} (751,050 sq ft). One of the most prominent landmarks in the Neihu Science Park along the bank of the Keelung River, the building serves as the corporate headquarters of the Taiwanese electronics manufacturer company Lite-On. Designed by Taiwanese architect Kris Yao symbolizing a pair of clasped hands pointing to the sky, the Lite-On Technology Center won the 2006 Professional Awards-General Design Award of Honor presented by the American Society of Landscape Architects.

== Gallery ==
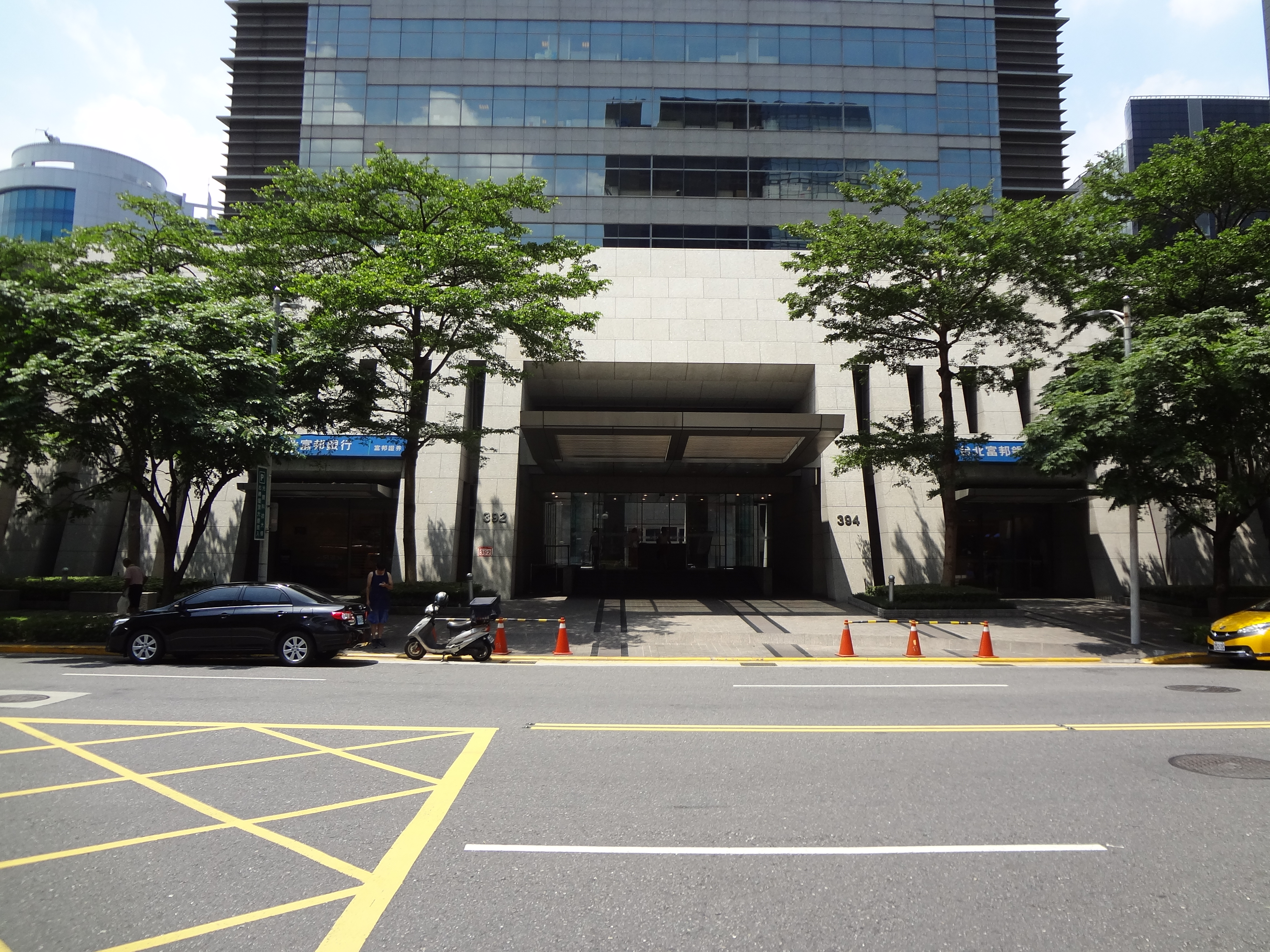
Building Entrance

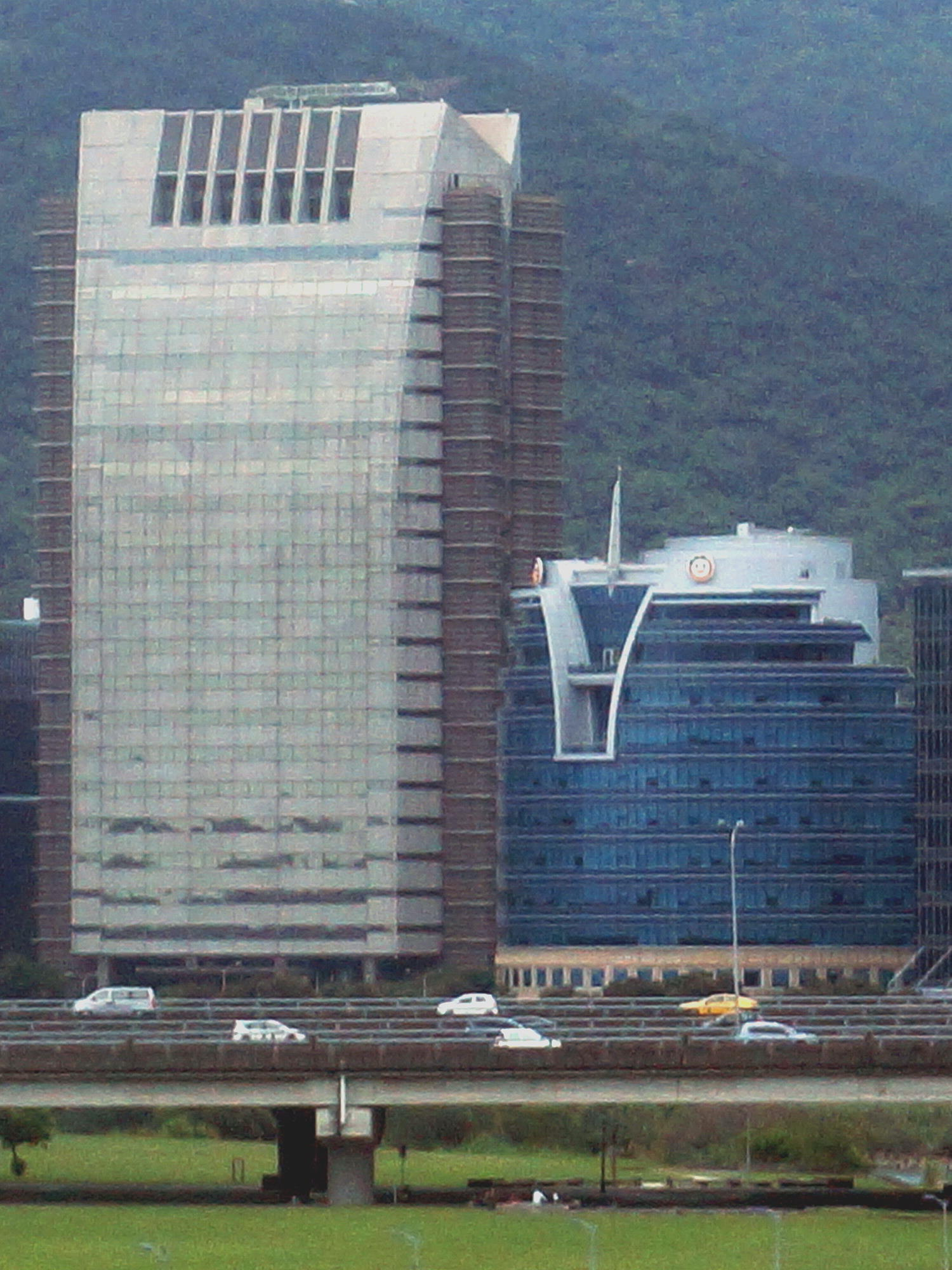

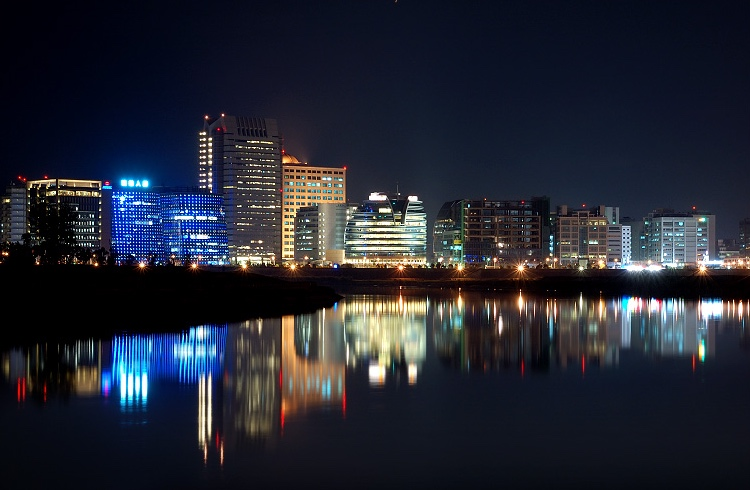
Building at night

== See also ==
- List of tallest buildings in Taiwan
- List of tallest buildings in Taipei
- Lite-On
- Kris Yao
- Elitegroup Computer Systems Headquarters
