= Kelti Group Headquarters =

Office building in Xinyi District, Taipei, Taiwan

Kelti Group Headquarters 克緹國際大樓
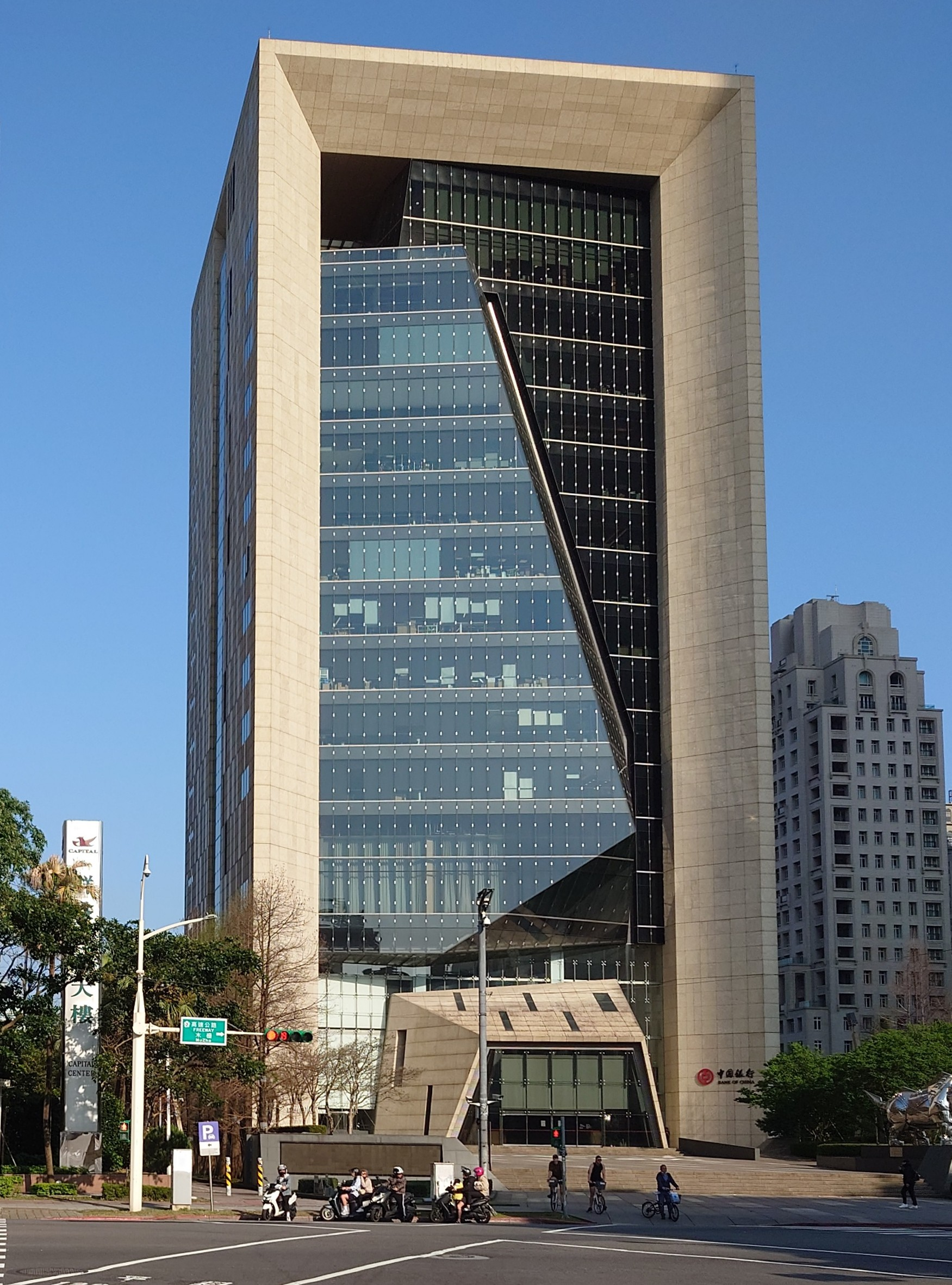
- Interactive map of the Kelti Group Headquarters 克緹國際大樓 area

General information
- Status: Completed
- Type: Office building
- Classification: Office
- Location: No. 105, Songren Road, Xinyi District, Taipei, Taiwan
- Coordinates: 25.035722475227843°N 121.56938086977291°E
- Construction started: 2008
- Completed: 2009

Height
- Roof: 91 m (299 ft)

Technical details
- Floor count: 19
- Floor area: 28,823.85 m^{2} (310,257.3 sq ft)

Design and construction
- Architect: Kris Yao

The Kelti Group Headquarters (Chinese: 克緹國際大樓) is a 19-story, 91 metres (299 ft) office building designed by Taiwanese architect Kris Yao and completed in 2009 in Xinyi District, Taipei, Taiwan. The building houses the corporate headquarters of Kelti Group as well as the Taipei Branch of the Bank of China.

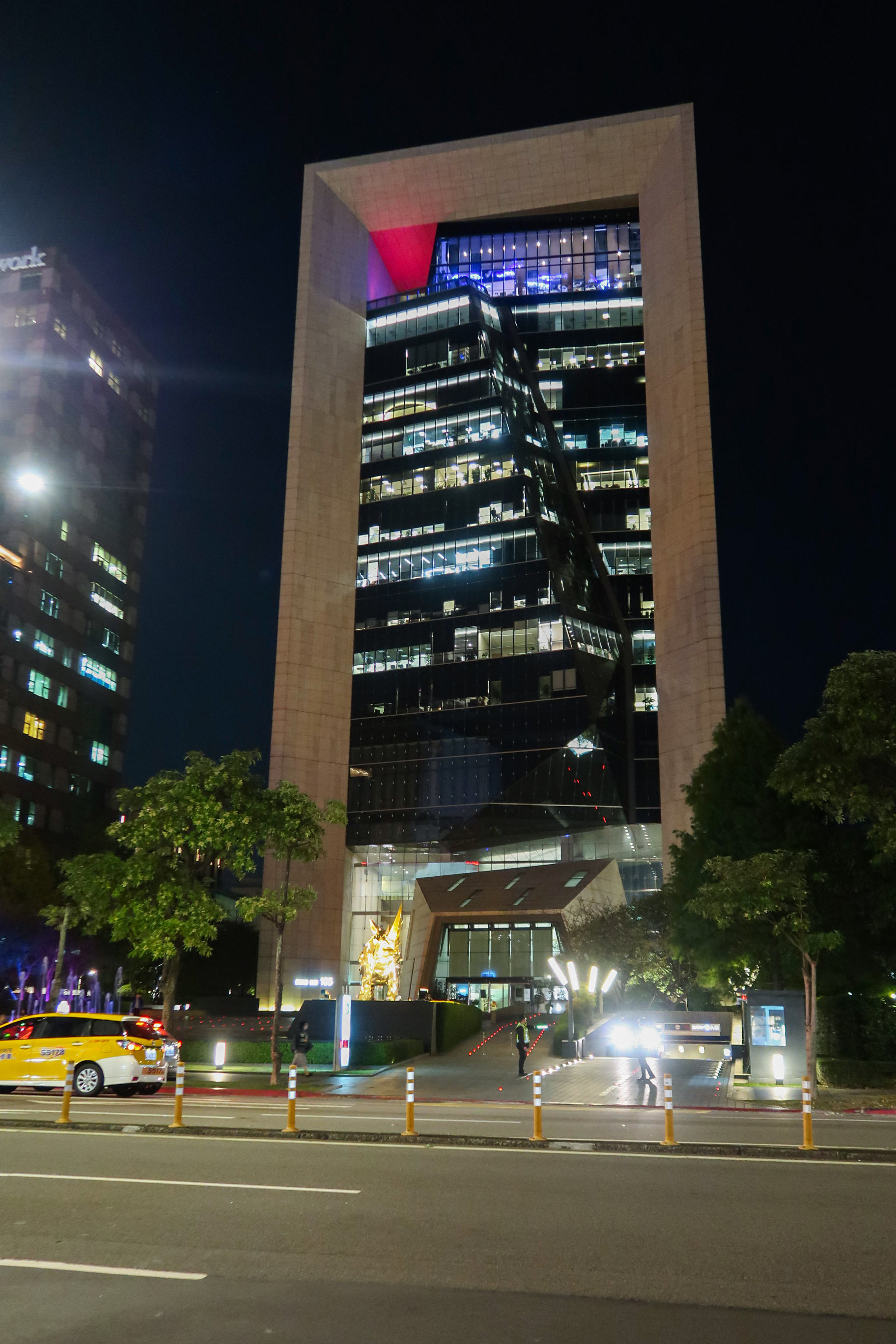
Building at night

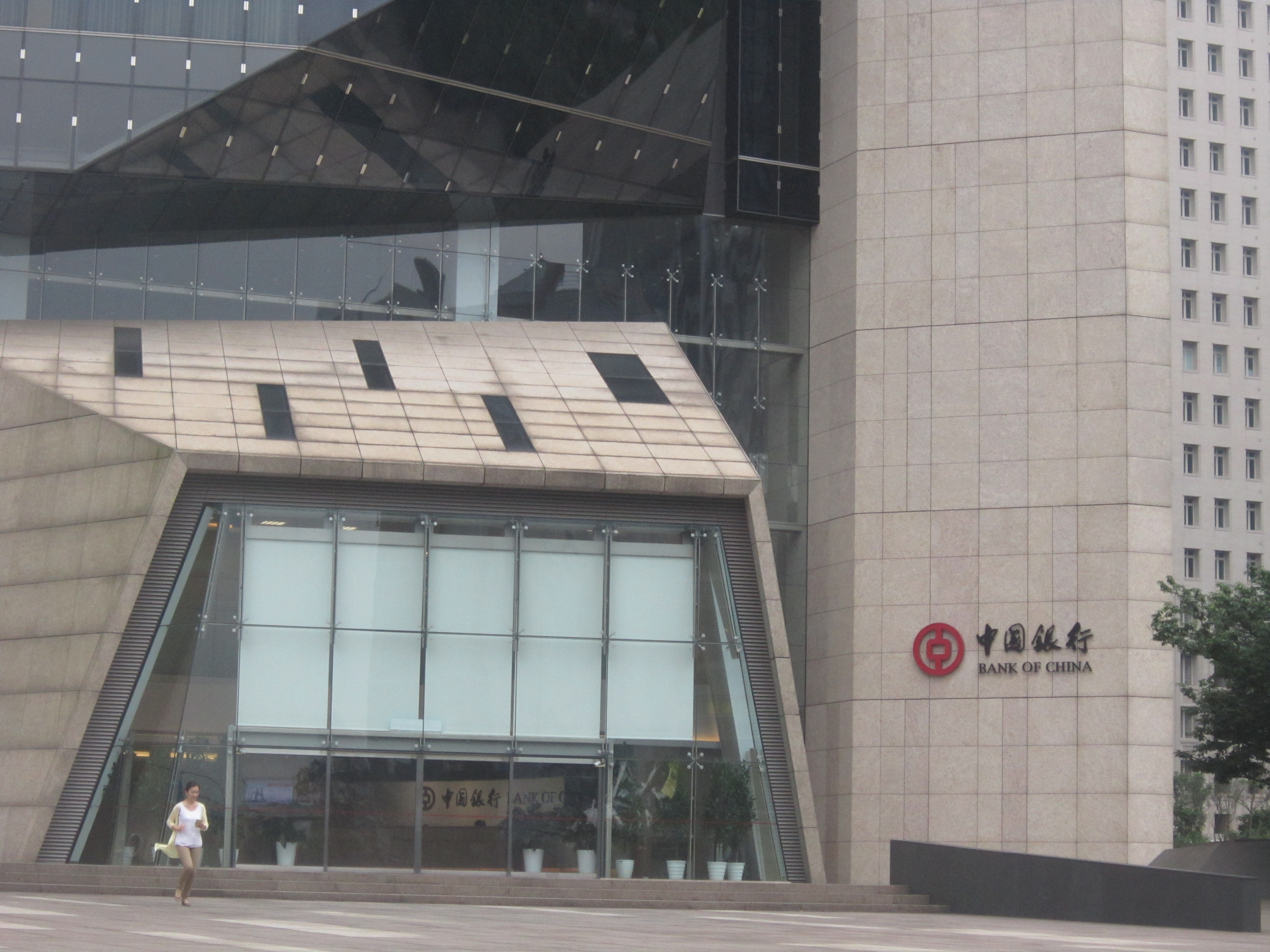
Taipei Branch, Bank of China

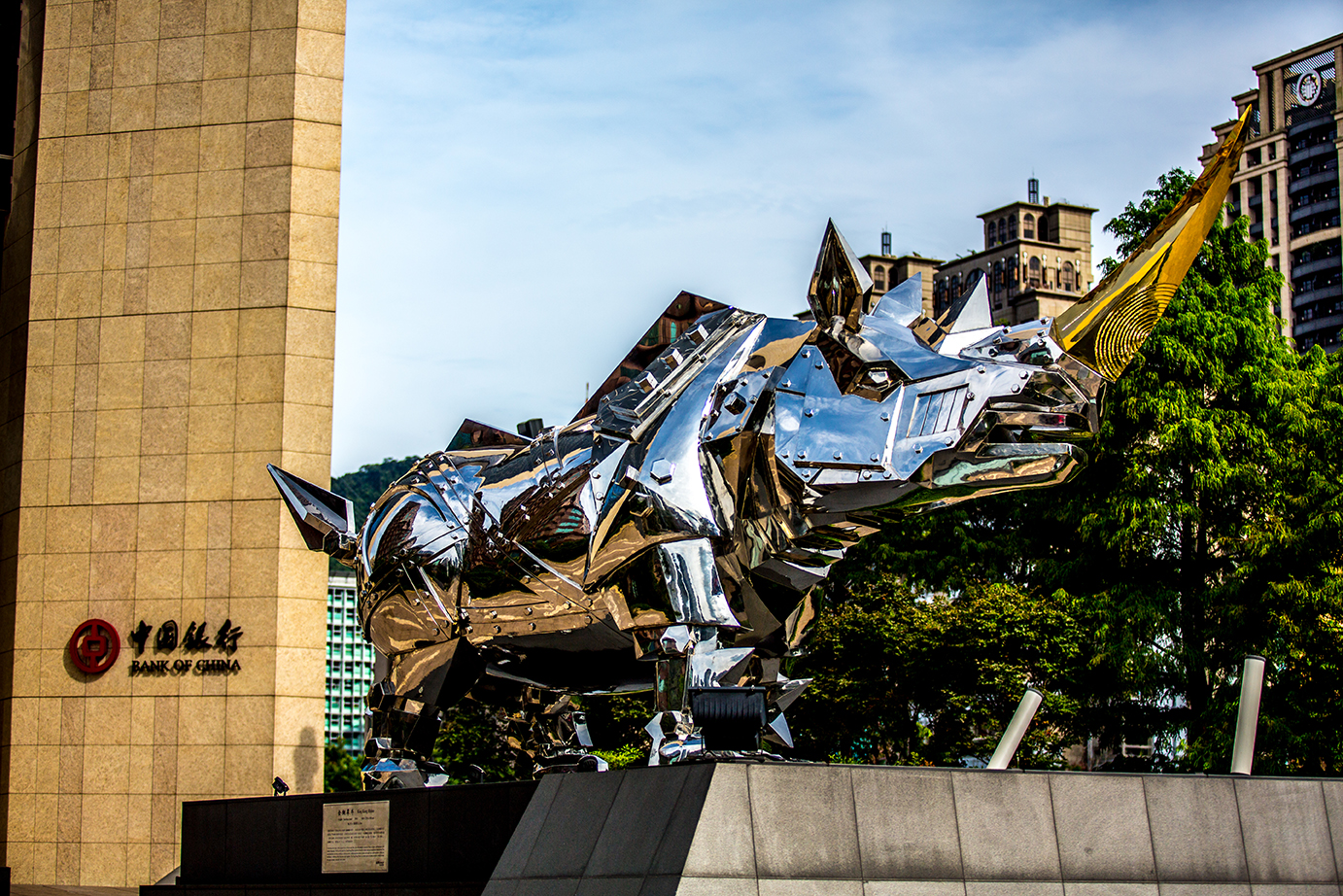
King Kong Rhino public art in front of the building

== See also ==
- List of tallest buildings in Taiwan
- List of tallest buildings in Taipei
- Xinyi Special District
