= Elitegroup Computer Systems Headquarters =

Skyscraper office building in Neihu District, Taipei, Taiwan

Elitegroup Computer Systems Headquarters 精英電腦總部大樓
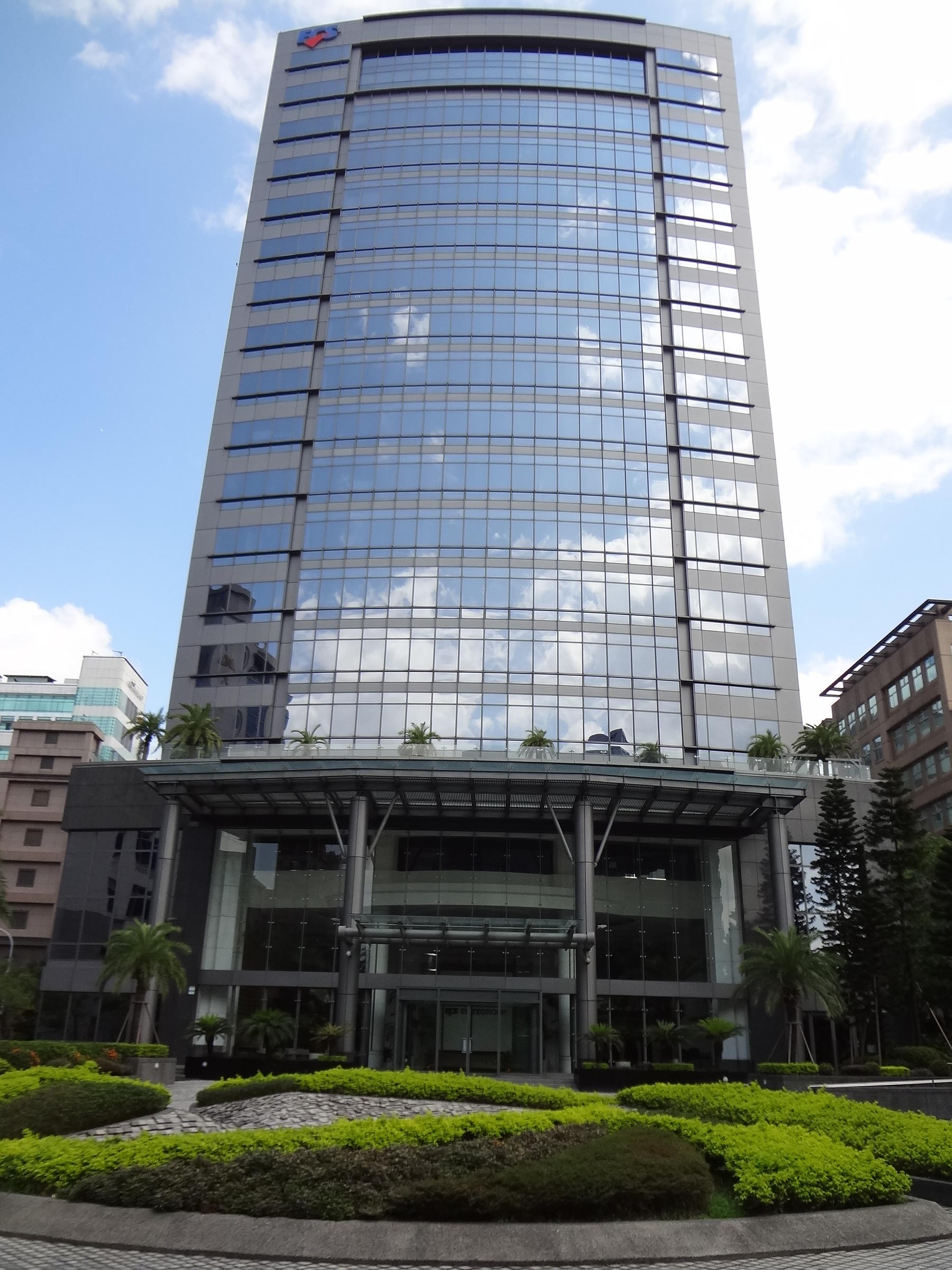
- Interactive map of the Elitegroup Computer Systems Headquarters 精英電腦總部大樓 area

General information
- Status: Completed
- Type: Office building
- Classification: Office
- Location: No. 239, Section 2, Tiding Boulevard, Neihu District, Taipei, Taiwan
- Coordinates: 25.078707111790767°N 121.5671976778997°E
- Completed: 2007

Technical details
- Floor count: 21

The Elitegroup Computer Systems Headquarters (Chinese: 精英電腦總部大樓) is a 21-storey skyscraper office building completed in 2007 and located in Neihu District, Taipei, Taiwan. One of the most prominent landmarks in the Neihu Science Park along the bank of the Keelung River, the building serves as the corporate headquarters of the Taiwanese electronics firm Elitegroup Computer Systems.

== See also ==
- List of tallest buildings in Taiwan
- List of tallest buildings in Taipei
- Elitegroup Computer Systems
- Lite-On Technology Center
