= Annong River =

River in Taiwan

Coordinates: 24°42′03″N 121°45′09″E

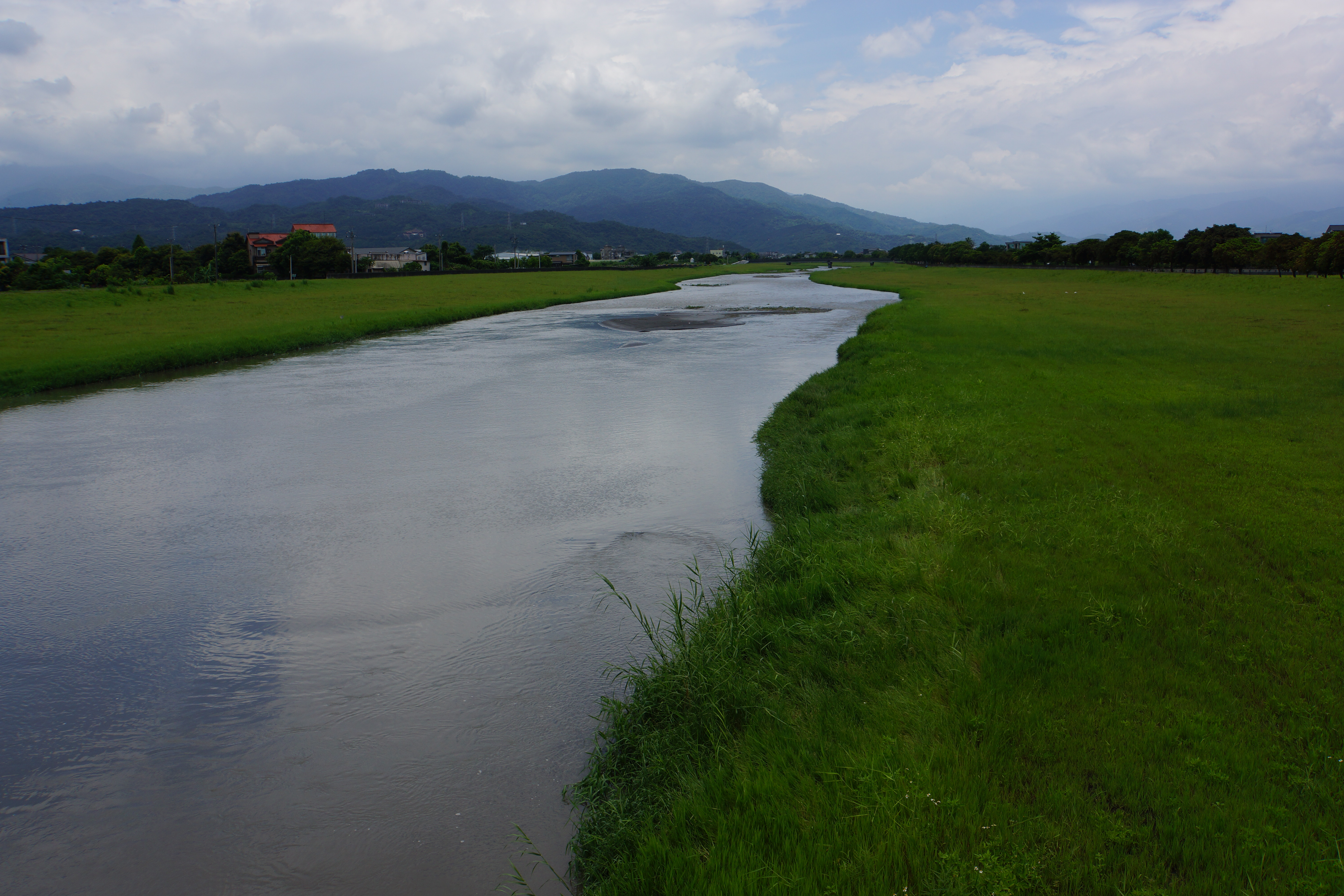
Annong River

Annong River (Traditional Chinese: 安農溪), originally named Dianhuo River, is a river in Taiwan located in Sanxing Township, Yilan County, approximately 3 kilometers from the downtown area of Luodong Township. It is one of the tributaries of the Luodong River in the Lanyang River system and serves as the drainage channel for the tailwater of the Lanyang Power Plant. The river is about 17.2 kilometers long, with a watershed area of approximately 55.9 square kilometers. It flows through the prime areas of Sanxing Township, providing essential water for agricultural irrigation in Sanxing Township and downstream towns. It is regarded as the "River of Life" of Sanxing Township due to its abundant water resources, which also make it suitable for rafting activities. Currently, the Annong River is managed by the First River Management Office of the Water Resources Agency under the Ministry of Economic Affairs. It is the most important and water-rich river in Sanxing Township, serving purposes of hydropower generation, irrigation, and tourism and recreation
