= New Taipei City Art Museum =

Museum in Yingge, New Taipei, Taiwan

New Taipei Museum of Arts
- 新北市立美術館

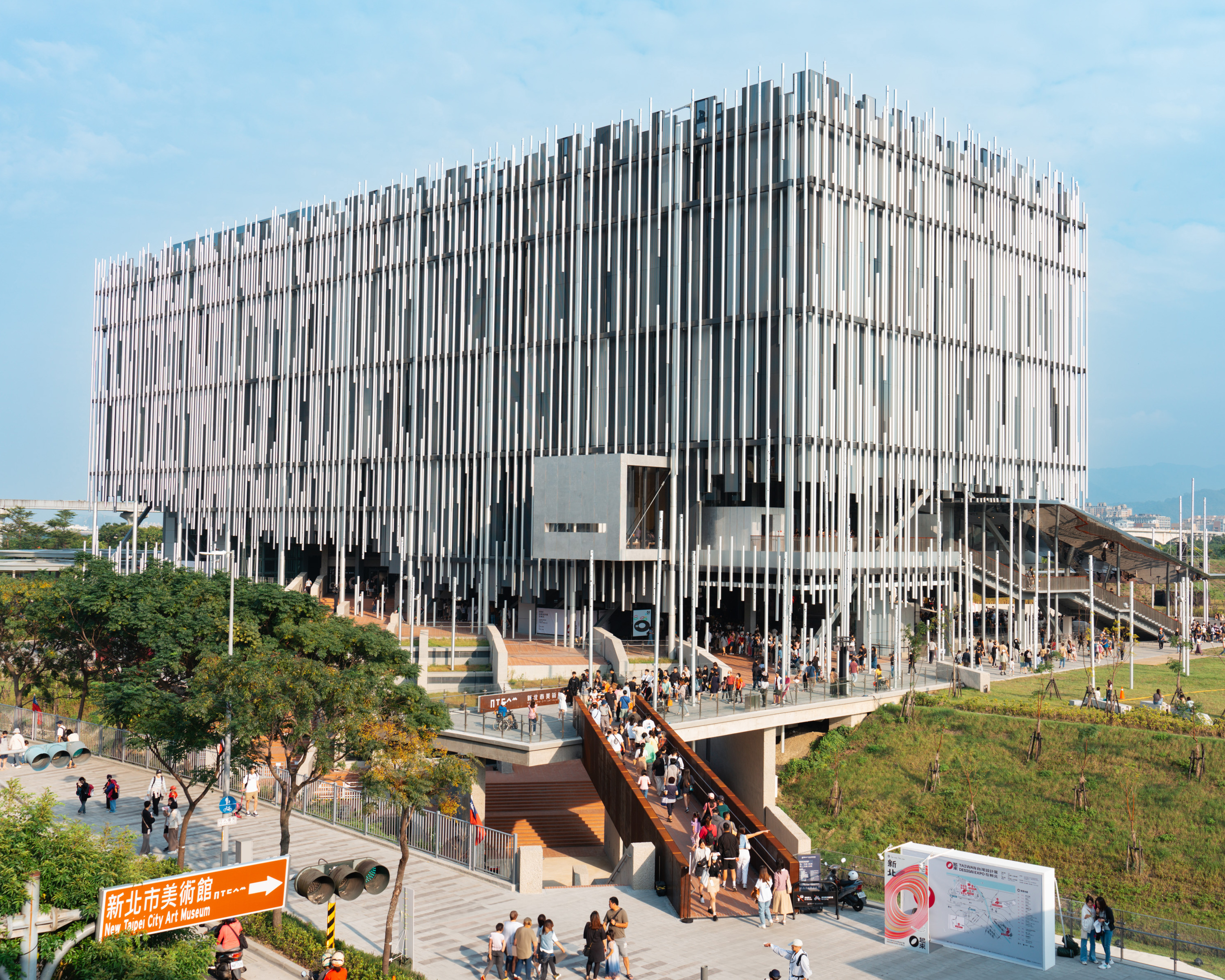
- Established: October 2023
- Location: Yingge, New Taipei, Taiwan
- Coordinates: 24.95262°N 121.35756°E
- Type: art museum
- Architect: Kris Yao
- Website: Official website

The New Taipei City Art Museum or New Taipei Museum of Arts (NTMOA; traditional Chinese: 新北市美術館; simplified Chinese: 新北市美术馆; pinyin: Xīnběishì Měishùguǎn) is a museum in Yingge District, New Taipei, Taiwan.

== History ==
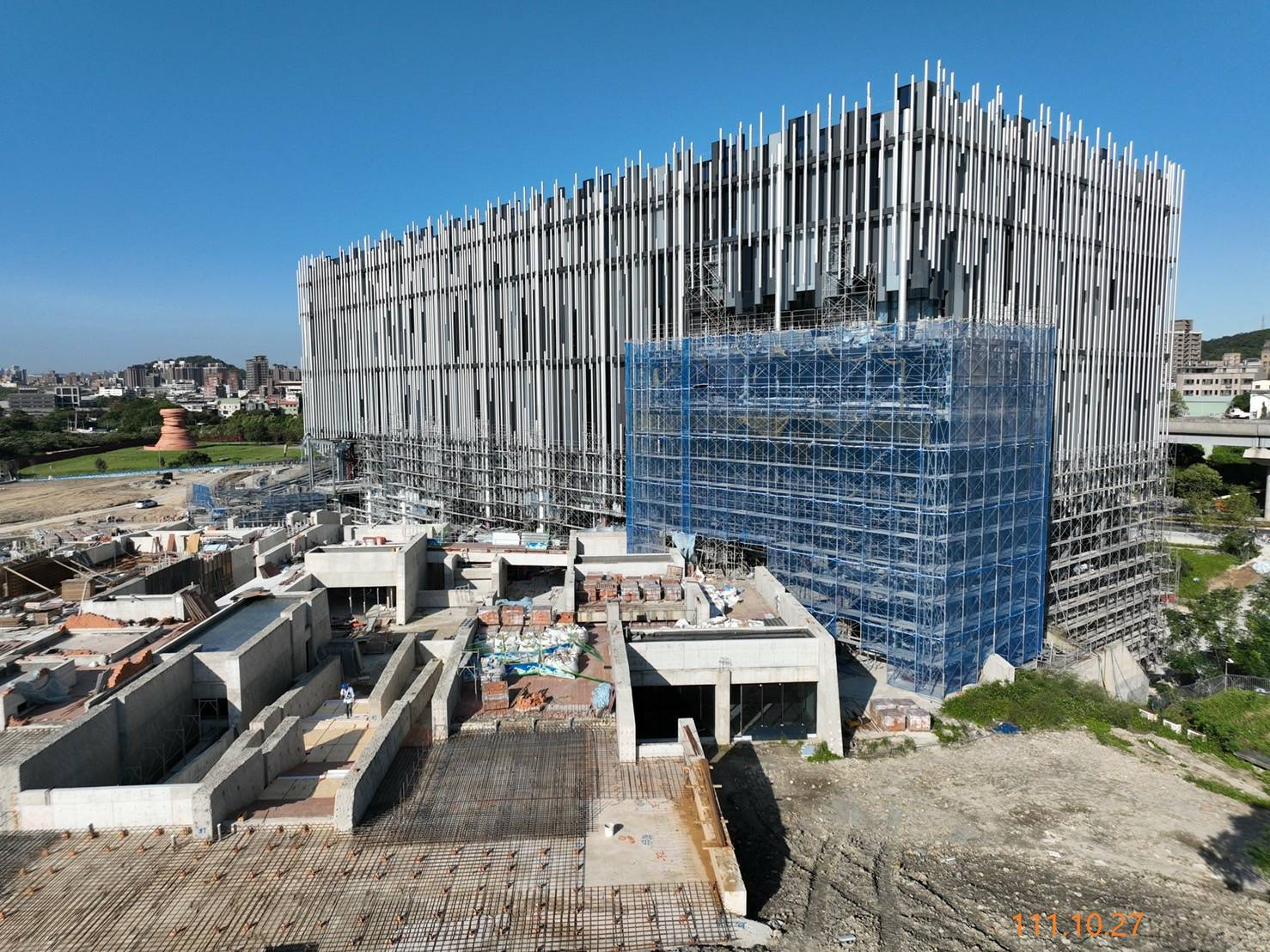
New Taipei Museum of Arts under construction in October 2022.

The groundbreaking ceremony for the construction of the museum was held on 4 December 2018 attended by New Taipei Mayor Eric Chu. The museum was opened as the main hall of the 2023 Taiwan Design Expo in October 2023.

== Architecture ==
The museum is designed by architect Kris Yao with an expected total floor area of 3.2 hectares. It will have 8 floors above ground and 3 floors below. It will consist of exhibition rooms, auditorium, children's art space, warehouse etc.

== See also ==
- List of museums in Taiwan
