= Elitegroup Computer Systems =

Taiwanese electronics company

Elitegroup Computer Systems Co., Ltd.
- Native name

Chinese name
- Traditional Chinese: 精英電腦股份有限公司
Transcriptions
- Company type: Public
- Traded as: TWSE: 2331
- Industry: Computer hardware; Electronics
- Founded: 1987; 39 years ago
- Headquarters: Taipei City, Taiwan
- Key people: Max Chung (Chairman & CEO); James Wang (GM)
- Products: Motherboards; Graphics cards; Education NBs; Mini PCs; EVCs; Gaming PCs
- Number of employees: 15,493
- Website: www.ecs.com.tw/en

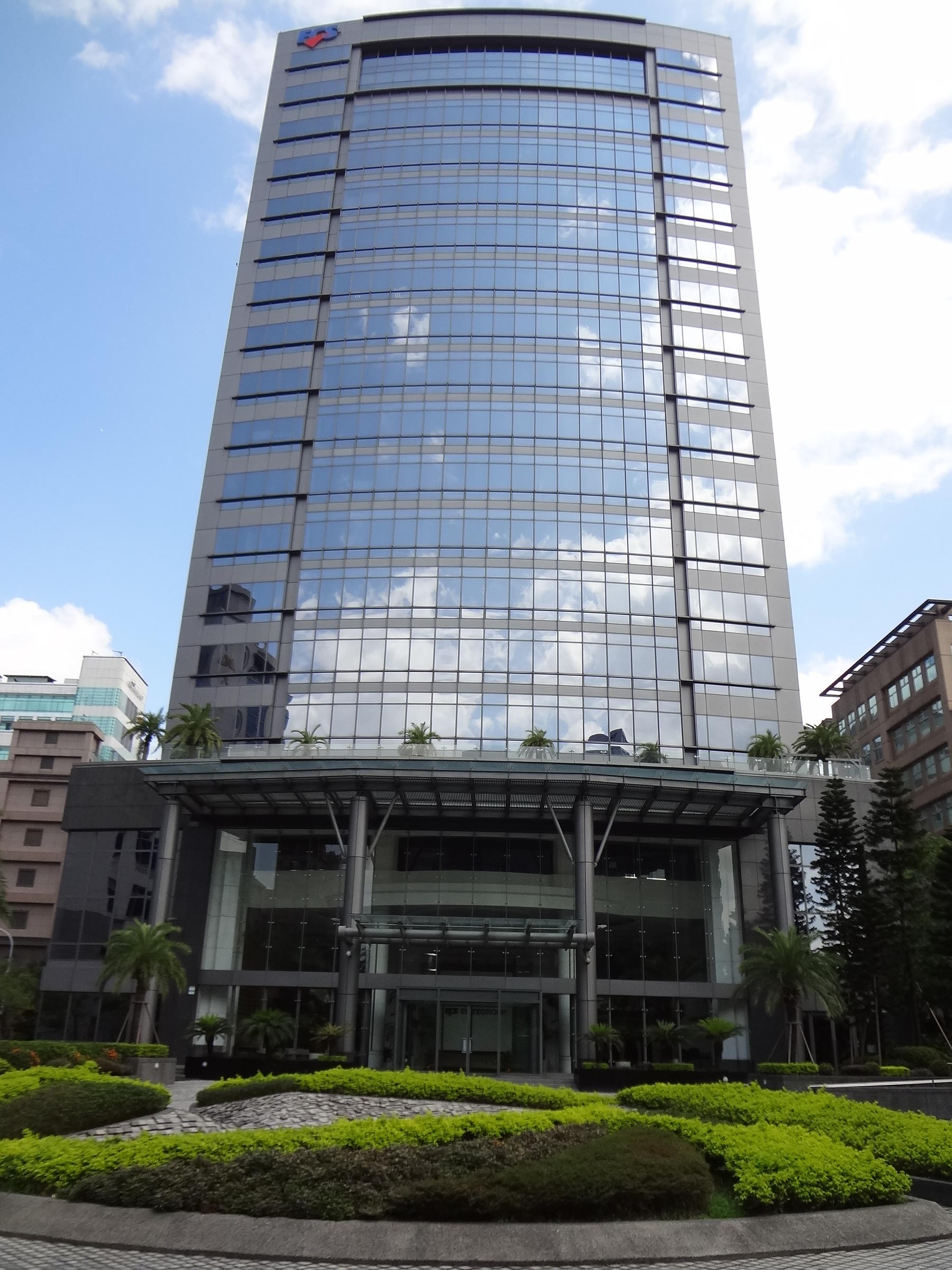
ECS headquarters building in Neihu District, Taipei City

Elitegroup Computer Systems Co., Ltd. (ECS; Chinese: 精英電腦股份有限公司) is a Taiwan-based electronics firm. It is the fifth largest PC motherboard manufacturer in the world (after Asus, Gigabyte Technology, ASRock, and MSI), with production reaching 24 million units in 2002.

The company has since concentrated on broadening its product range. After ECS's purchase of laptop manufacturer Uniwill in 2006, the company has been involved in the design and manufacture of laptops, desktop replacement computers and multimedia products. ECS computers used to be sold by Fry's Electronics under the "Great Quality" ("GQ") brand.

== Design & Production ==
While Elitegroup Computer Systems is headquartered in Taiwan, the company has production facilities in Asia and North America:

- Special Economic Zone Shenzhen: (ECS Manufacturing) & Golden Elite Technology & China Golden Elite Technology
- Suzhou: (China ESZ)
- Juarez, Mexico: China EMX, Mexico EMX Plant

== OEM ==
Many of these motherboards have been produced for OEM customers and are used in systems assembled and sold by such brand-name companies as Lenovo, HP and Zoostorm. Its main competitors are MSI and ASRock.

ECS has also produced computers for Acer.

== History ==
Former PCChips logo

Founded in 1987, ECS is headquartered in Taiwan with operations in North America, Europe and the Pacific Rim. The company merged with PCChips, a major manufacturer of low-cost motherboards, in 2005. In June 2003, ECS was selected for two years in a row for Business Week magazine's exclusive Information Technology 100 list.

Since the 2010s, after years of declining market share in the do-it-yourself PC builder business, the company has deemphasized its consumer motherboard business, prioritizing its OEM motherboard and mini-PC businesses.
