= Koos Group =

Taiwanese conglomerate

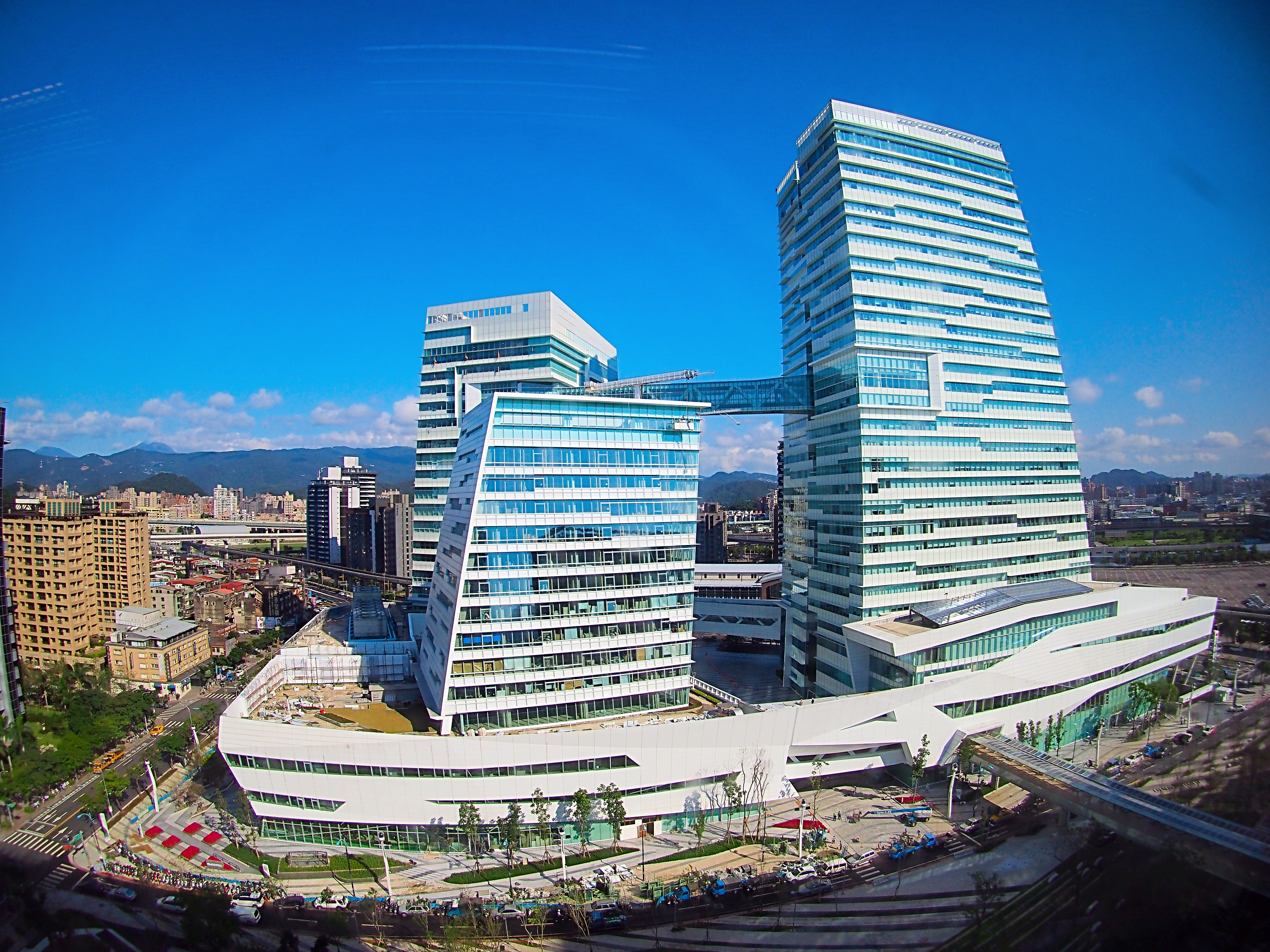
CTBC Headquarters, Taipei – part of the Koos Group.

The Koos Group (Chinese: 和信集團; pinyin: Héxìn Jítuán), founded by the Jeffrey Koo Sr. and Koo Chen-fu, the Koo Family, is a Taiwan-based pan-Asian business group involved in a vast range of industries, which include banking, manufacturing, petrochemicals, electronics, leasing, cement, financial services, hospitality, real estate, private equity, manufacturing, and investment banking. The Koos Group is most renowned for managing CTBC Financial Holding.

== History ==
The company was founded in the latter 19th century by Koo Hsien-jung, during the period of Japanese rule in Taiwan. It is majority-owned by the Koo family. The company was headed by Koo Chen-fu and Jeffrey Koo Sr. from 1940 until their deaths in 2005 and 2012 respectively. The group split its dealings in 2003 into two clans of the Koo Family; Koo Chen-fu's side of the family manages Taiwan Cement and his nephew Jeffrey Koo Sr.'s side of the family manages CTBC Financial Holding, Chailease Holding, KGI Financial Holding and KGI Life Insurance.

Jeffrey Koo Sr.'s children Jeffrey Koo Jr., Andre Koo and Angelo Koo now manages CTBC Financial Holding, Chailease Holding and KGI Financial Holding respectively. Koo Chen-fu's children, Chester Koo and Leslie Koo manages Taiwan Cement.

Andre Koo Jr., the fifth-generation of the Koo Family, is the heir to the Koo Family empire and manages K8 Capital, a hybrid Private Credit and Venture Capital firm.

== Operations ==
The Koos Group encompasses over 80 companies, with more than 60,000 employees worldwide. In 2001, The Wall Street Journal reported total assets of the Koos Group to be US$36 billion. Today, the total net worth of the Koo Family is estimated to be over US$250 billion.

Koos Group is headquartered in Taipei. It has operations in Taiwan, Hong Kong (KGI Hong Kong Group since 1997) and Singapore (KGI Securities Singapore). Its holding company is CTBC Bank.

== Founder and Chairmen ==
- Koo Chen-fu
- Jeffrey Koo Sr.

=== Subsidiaries ===
- CTBC Financial Holding
- Chailease Holding
- KGI Financial Holding
- KGI Life Insurance
- Taiwan Cement

== See also ==
- Chinatrust
- Chinatrust Whales
