= Koo Hsien-jung =

Taiwanese businessman and politician

- 辜顯榮
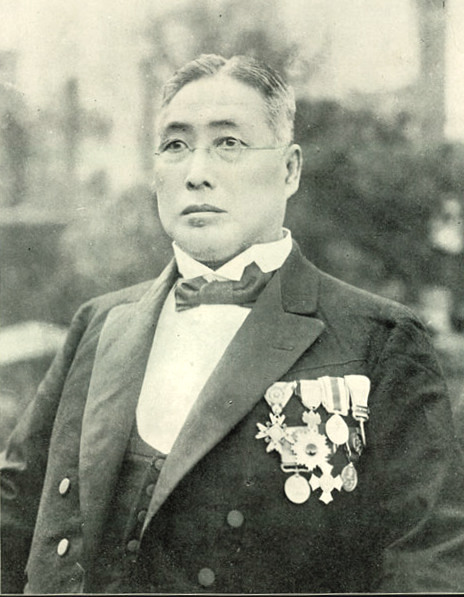
- Koo in 1921

Member of the House of Peers
- In office 3 July 1934 – 9 December 1937 Nominated by the Emperor

Personal details
- Born: 18 March 1866 Lukang, Qing Taiwan
- Died: 9 December 1937 (aged 71) Setagaya, Tokyo, Japan
- Children: 12, including Chen-fu and Kwang-ming
- Relatives: Chester Koo (grandson); Leslie Koo (grandson); Richard Koo (grandson)
- Occupation: Businessperson

Koo Hsien-jung (Chinese: 辜顯榮; pinyin: Gū Xiǎnróng; Wade–Giles: Ku^{1} Hsien^{3}-jung^{2}; Pe̍h-ōe-jī: Ko͘ Hián-êng; Japanese: 辜 顕栄; Romaji: Ko Ken’ei; 18 March 1866 – 9 December 1937) was a Taiwanese businessman and politician who enjoyed strong links to the colonial administration of Taiwan under Japanese rule. He founded the Koos Group of companies, the largest business group in Taiwan.

Koo was a businessman at the time of the Treaty of Shimonoseki in which Qing dynasty China ceded Taiwan to Japan. When the Japanese forces arrived in Taiwan in 1895, Koo initiated contact with the Japanese forces in Keelung and urged them to enter Taipei to restore order.

Koo's close links to the Japanese allowed him both to pursue a successful political career (he became the first Taiwanese to be appointed by the emperor to the House of Peers of Japan, in 1934) and to build a collection of businesses that formed the nucleus of today's Koos Group of companies.

Koo had four concubines, eight sons and four daughters. His fifth son, Koo Chen-fu, inherited control of his father's business and served as the negotiator for Taiwan during the Wang–Koo summit. His eighth son, Koo Kwang-ming, became a leader of the Taiwan Independence movement. His grandson is Richard Koo, an economist specializing in balance sheet recessions.
