= List of minor planets: 526001–527000 =

The following is a partial list of minor planets, running from minor-planet number 526001 through 527000, inclusive. The primary data for this and other partial lists is based on JPL's "Small-Body Orbital Elements" and data available from the Minor Planet Center. Critical list information is also provided by the MPC, unless otherwise specified from Lowell Observatory. A detailed description of the table's columns and additional sources are given on the main page including a complete list of every page in this series, and a statistical break-up on the dynamical classification of minor planets.

Also see the summary list of all named bodies in numerical and alphabetical order, and the corresponding naming citations for the number range of this particular list. New namings may only be added to this list after official publication, as the preannouncement of names is condemned by the Working Group for Small Bodies Nomenclature of the International Astronomical Union.

Near-Earth obj.	MBA (inner)	MBA (outer)	Centaur
Mars-crosser	MBA (middle)	Jupiter trojan	Trans-Neptunian obj.
Unclassified

== 526001–526100 ==
Designation			Discovery			Properties		Ref
Permanent	Provisional	Named after	Date	Site	Discoverer(s)	Category	Diam.	Ref
526001	2005 UM_{232}	—	October 25, 2005	Mount Lemmon	Mount Lemmon Survey	·	2.9 km	MPC · JPL
526002	2005 UZ_{232}	—	October 25, 2005	Kitt Peak	Spacewatch	·	790 m	MPC · JPL
526003	2005 UQ_{234}	—	October 25, 2005	Catalina	CSS	·	1.4 km	MPC · JPL
526004	2005 UM_{235}	—	October 25, 2005	Kitt Peak	Spacewatch	·	4.7 km	MPC · JPL
526005	2005 UK_{245}	—	October 25, 2005	Kitt Peak	Spacewatch	·	3.0 km	MPC · JPL
526006	2005 UC_{247}	—	October 28, 2005	Mount Lemmon	Mount Lemmon Survey	EOS	2.0 km	MPC · JPL
526007	2005 UJ_{248}	—	October 1, 2005	Mount Lemmon	Mount Lemmon Survey	EUN	1.0 km	MPC · JPL
526008	2005 UK_{249}	—	October 28, 2005	Mount Lemmon	Mount Lemmon Survey	·	670 m	MPC · JPL
526009	2005 UU_{252}	—	October 26, 2005	Anderson Mesa	LONEOS	·	780 m	MPC · JPL
526010	2005 UG_{254}	—	October 29, 2005	Catalina	CSS	H	400 m	MPC · JPL
526011	2005 UV_{256}	—	October 25, 2005	Mount Lemmon	Mount Lemmon Survey	H	370 m	MPC · JPL
526012	2005 UT_{258}	—	October 25, 2005	Kitt Peak	Spacewatch	·	2.3 km	MPC · JPL
526013	2005 UM_{259}	—	October 25, 2005	Kitt Peak	Spacewatch	H	350 m	MPC · JPL
526014	2005 UL_{261}	—	October 25, 2005	Mount Lemmon	Mount Lemmon Survey	·	1.5 km	MPC · JPL
526015	2005 UO_{262}	—	October 26, 2005	Kitt Peak	Spacewatch	·	1.1 km	MPC · JPL
526016	2005 UW_{265}	—	October 27, 2005	Kitt Peak	Spacewatch	·	1.2 km	MPC · JPL
526017	2005 UY_{271}	—	October 28, 2005	Kitt Peak	Spacewatch	(12739)	1.7 km	MPC · JPL
526018	2005 UE_{273}	—	October 28, 2005	Mount Lemmon	Mount Lemmon Survey	·	2.5 km	MPC · JPL
526019	2005 UN_{273}	—	October 28, 2005	Mount Lemmon	Mount Lemmon Survey	·	3.3 km	MPC · JPL
526020	2005 UJ_{279}	—	October 24, 2005	Kitt Peak	Spacewatch	EOS	1.6 km	MPC · JPL
526021	2005 UG_{281}	—	October 25, 2005	Mount Lemmon	Mount Lemmon Survey	EOS	1.4 km	MPC · JPL
526022	2005 US_{285}	—	September 25, 2005	Kitt Peak	Spacewatch	·	1.3 km	MPC · JPL
526023	2005 UJ_{286}	—	October 26, 2005	Kitt Peak	Spacewatch	·	1.3 km	MPC · JPL
526024	2005 UP_{288}	—	October 10, 1994	Kitt Peak	Spacewatch	·	3.4 km	MPC · JPL
526025	2005 UQ_{288}	—	October 26, 2005	Kitt Peak	Spacewatch	·	2.7 km	MPC · JPL
526026	2005 UT_{288}	—	October 26, 2005	Kitt Peak	Spacewatch	·	1.0 km	MPC · JPL
526027	2005 UP_{290}	—	October 26, 2005	Kitt Peak	Spacewatch	(260) · CYB	3.2 km	MPC · JPL
526028	2005 UK_{294}	—	October 26, 2005	Kitt Peak	Spacewatch	·	2.6 km	MPC · JPL
526029	2005 UC_{297}	—	October 26, 2005	Kitt Peak	Spacewatch	EOS	1.6 km	MPC · JPL
526030	2005 US_{298}	—	October 26, 2005	Kitt Peak	Spacewatch	·	1.5 km	MPC · JPL
526031	2005 UY_{298}	—	October 26, 2005	Kitt Peak	Spacewatch	·	1.5 km	MPC · JPL
526032	2005 UR_{301}	—	October 26, 2005	Kitt Peak	Spacewatch	·	1.8 km	MPC · JPL
526033	2005 UY_{301}	—	October 26, 2005	Kitt Peak	Spacewatch	·	470 m	MPC · JPL
526034	2005 UC_{302}	—	October 26, 2005	Kitt Peak	Spacewatch	EOS	2.0 km	MPC · JPL
526035	2005 UH_{303}	—	October 26, 2005	Kitt Peak	Spacewatch	·	1.4 km	MPC · JPL
526036	2005 UY_{304}	—	October 26, 2005	Kitt Peak	Spacewatch	·	1.9 km	MPC · JPL
526037	2005 UB_{305}	—	October 26, 2005	Kitt Peak	Spacewatch	·	1.2 km	MPC · JPL
526038	2005 US_{314}	—	October 28, 2005	Catalina	CSS	·	1.5 km	MPC · JPL
526039	2005 UA_{316}	—	October 25, 2005	Kitt Peak	Spacewatch	·	860 m	MPC · JPL
526040	2005 UO_{316}	—	October 25, 2005	Kitt Peak	Spacewatch	·	1.4 km	MPC · JPL
526041	2005 UY_{319}	—	October 27, 2005	Kitt Peak	Spacewatch	·	1.1 km	MPC · JPL
526042	2005 UM_{321}	—	October 27, 2005	Mount Lemmon	Mount Lemmon Survey	·	950 m	MPC · JPL
526043	2005 UX_{326}	—	October 11, 2005	Kitt Peak	Spacewatch	·	1.0 km	MPC · JPL
526044	2005 UU_{329}	—	October 28, 2005	Mount Lemmon	Mount Lemmon Survey	·	1.1 km	MPC · JPL
526045	2005 UF_{331}	—	September 29, 2005	Catalina	CSS	·	1.5 km	MPC · JPL
526046	2005 UE_{333}	—	October 29, 2005	Mount Lemmon	Mount Lemmon Survey	·	1.1 km	MPC · JPL
526047	2005 UH_{333}	—	October 22, 2005	Kitt Peak	Spacewatch	·	1.8 km	MPC · JPL
526048	2005 UV_{333}	—	October 29, 2005	Mount Lemmon	Mount Lemmon Survey	·	2.0 km	MPC · JPL
526049	2005 UC_{334}	—	October 29, 2005	Mount Lemmon	Mount Lemmon Survey	H	500 m	MPC · JPL
526050	2005 UG_{337}	—	October 1, 2005	Mount Lemmon	Mount Lemmon Survey	NYS	1.3 km	MPC · JPL
526051	2005 UP_{338}	—	October 31, 2005	Kitt Peak	Spacewatch	·	4.4 km	MPC · JPL
526052	2005 UV_{338}	—	October 31, 2005	Kitt Peak	Spacewatch	·	1.0 km	MPC · JPL
526053	2005 UM_{339}	—	October 31, 2005	Kitt Peak	Spacewatch	·	1.4 km	MPC · JPL
526054	2005 UP_{339}	—	October 31, 2005	Kitt Peak	Spacewatch	·	1.1 km	MPC · JPL
526055	2005 UA_{344}	—	October 29, 2005	Kitt Peak	Spacewatch	(5)	950 m	MPC · JPL
526056	2005 UO_{345}	—	October 29, 2005	Mount Lemmon	Mount Lemmon Survey	·	1.4 km	MPC · JPL
526057	2005 UO_{350}	—	October 29, 2005	Mount Lemmon	Mount Lemmon Survey	·	1.4 km	MPC · JPL
526058	2005 UZ_{350}	—	October 29, 2005	Catalina	CSS	·	690 m	MPC · JPL
526059	2005 UW_{352}	—	October 29, 2005	Catalina	CSS	·	1.7 km	MPC · JPL
526060	2005 UN_{353}	—	October 22, 2005	Kitt Peak	Spacewatch	(1547)	1.3 km	MPC · JPL
526061	2005 US_{355}	—	October 29, 2005	Mount Lemmon	Mount Lemmon Survey	·	1.5 km	MPC · JPL
526062	2005 UK_{359}	—	October 25, 2005	Kitt Peak	Spacewatch	·	1.4 km	MPC · JPL
526063	2005 UW_{362}	—	September 30, 2005	Mount Lemmon	Mount Lemmon Survey	·	930 m	MPC · JPL
526064	2005 UR_{366}	—	October 27, 2005	Kitt Peak	Spacewatch	RAF	910 m	MPC · JPL
526065	2005 US_{367}	—	October 27, 2005	Kitt Peak	Spacewatch	(5)	770 m	MPC · JPL
526066	2005 UK_{369}	—	October 27, 2005	Kitt Peak	Spacewatch	·	1.1 km	MPC · JPL
526067	2005 UN_{370}	—	October 27, 2005	Kitt Peak	Spacewatch	·	1.2 km	MPC · JPL
526068	2005 UR_{371}	—	October 27, 2005	Mount Lemmon	Mount Lemmon Survey	·	1.5 km	MPC · JPL
526069	2005 UA_{372}	—	October 27, 2005	Kitt Peak	Spacewatch	·	3.4 km	MPC · JPL
526070	2005 UO_{372}	—	October 27, 2005	Kitt Peak	Spacewatch	·	2.2 km	MPC · JPL
526071	2005 UH_{373}	—	October 27, 2005	Kitt Peak	Spacewatch	·	910 m	MPC · JPL
526072	2005 UD_{376}	—	October 27, 2005	Kitt Peak	Spacewatch	·	1.6 km	MPC · JPL
526073	2005 UP_{378}	—	March 15, 2004	Kitt Peak	Spacewatch	·	660 m	MPC · JPL
526074	2005 UX_{384}	—	October 27, 2005	Kitt Peak	Spacewatch	·	3.1 km	MPC · JPL
526075	2005 UH_{385}	—	October 27, 2005	Kitt Peak	Spacewatch	·	1.1 km	MPC · JPL
526076	2005 UM_{392}	—	October 29, 2005	Mount Lemmon	Mount Lemmon Survey	·	3.9 km	MPC · JPL
526077	2005 US_{393}	—	October 28, 2005	Catalina	CSS	·	1.6 km	MPC · JPL
526078	2005 UH_{394}	—	October 29, 2005	Catalina	CSS	·	1.8 km	MPC · JPL
526079	2005 UX_{396}	—	October 27, 2005	Catalina	CSS	·	3.5 km	MPC · JPL
526080	2005 UW_{401}	—	October 27, 2005	Kitt Peak	Spacewatch	·	1.2 km	MPC · JPL
526081	2005 UN_{404}	—	October 23, 2005	Kitt Peak	Spacewatch	·	2.0 km	MPC · JPL
526082	2005 UQ_{406}	—	October 30, 2005	Catalina	CSS	·	600 m	MPC · JPL
526083	2005 UR_{408}	—	October 9, 2001	Kitt Peak	Spacewatch	·	1.1 km	MPC · JPL
526084	2005 UN_{409}	—	October 31, 2005	Socorro	LINEAR	(1547)	1.4 km	MPC · JPL
526085	2005 UM_{412}	—	October 31, 2005	Mount Lemmon	Mount Lemmon Survey	·	1.1 km	MPC · JPL
526086	2005 UD_{416}	—	October 25, 2005	Kitt Peak	Spacewatch	·	1.4 km	MPC · JPL
526087	2005 UZ_{416}	—	October 25, 2005	Kitt Peak	Spacewatch	·	1.4 km	MPC · JPL
526088	2005 UH_{417}	—	October 25, 2005	Kitt Peak	Spacewatch	·	1.1 km	MPC · JPL
526089	2005 UK_{418}	—	October 25, 2005	Kitt Peak	Spacewatch	·	1.0 km	MPC · JPL
526090	2005 UJ_{419}	—	October 25, 2005	Kitt Peak	Spacewatch	·	3.1 km	MPC · JPL
526091	2005 UU_{420}	—	October 25, 2005	Mount Lemmon	Mount Lemmon Survey	·	1.6 km	MPC · JPL
526092	2005 UD_{421}	—	October 1, 2005	Mount Lemmon	Mount Lemmon Survey	(5)	780 m	MPC · JPL
526093	2005 UJ_{425}	—	October 25, 2005	Kitt Peak	Spacewatch	(5)	800 m	MPC · JPL
526094	2005 UF_{430}	—	October 28, 2005	Kitt Peak	Spacewatch	·	1.2 km	MPC · JPL
526095	2005 UH_{430}	—	October 28, 2005	Kitt Peak	Spacewatch	·	3.1 km	MPC · JPL
526096	2005 UZ_{431}	—	October 28, 2005	Kitt Peak	Spacewatch	·	1.3 km	MPC · JPL
526097	2005 UY_{433}	—	October 29, 2005	Catalina	CSS	EUN	1.2 km	MPC · JPL
526098	2005 UV_{434}	—	October 7, 2005	Mount Lemmon	Mount Lemmon Survey	·	1.3 km	MPC · JPL
526099	2005 UK_{435}	—	May 21, 2004	Kitt Peak	Spacewatch	·	1.0 km	MPC · JPL
526100	2005 UO_{441}	—	October 29, 2005	Kitt Peak	Spacewatch	H	630 m	MPC · JPL

== 526101–526200 ==
back to top

Designation			Discovery			Properties		Ref
Permanent	Provisional	Named after	Date	Site	Discoverer(s)	Category	Diam.	Ref
526101	2005 UW_{441}	—	October 29, 2005	Kitt Peak	Spacewatch	·	1.4 km	MPC · JPL
526102	2005 UK_{442}	—	September 30, 2005	Mount Lemmon	Mount Lemmon Survey	EUN	1.4 km	MPC · JPL
526103	2005 UO_{444}	—	October 30, 2005	Mount Lemmon	Mount Lemmon Survey	·	640 m	MPC · JPL
526104	2005 UH_{445}	—	October 22, 2005	Catalina	CSS	·	1.6 km	MPC · JPL
526105	2005 UV_{445}	—	October 31, 2005	Mount Lemmon	Mount Lemmon Survey	·	2.1 km	MPC · JPL
526106	2005 UW_{447}	—	October 30, 2005	Catalina	CSS	·	620 m	MPC · JPL
526107	2005 UJ_{448}	—	October 30, 2005	Socorro	LINEAR	(1547)	1.4 km	MPC · JPL
526108	2005 UW_{450}	—	October 27, 2005	Mount Lemmon	Mount Lemmon Survey	NYS	1.0 km	MPC · JPL
526109	2005 UN_{451}	—	October 28, 2005	Kitt Peak	Spacewatch	EOS	1.4 km	MPC · JPL
526110	2005 UU_{452}	—	October 29, 2005	Kitt Peak	Spacewatch	(5)	870 m	MPC · JPL
526111	2005 UJ_{456}	—	October 8, 2005	Socorro	LINEAR	·	680 m	MPC · JPL
526112	2005 UP_{456}	—	October 30, 2005	Catalina	CSS	·	1.1 km	MPC · JPL
526113	2005 UL_{458}	—	October 30, 2005	Mount Lemmon	Mount Lemmon Survey	·	2.8 km	MPC · JPL
526114	2005 UM_{458}	—	October 30, 2005	Mount Lemmon	Mount Lemmon Survey	VER	2.6 km	MPC · JPL
526115	2005 UM_{459}	—	October 27, 2005	Mount Lemmon	Mount Lemmon Survey	·	2.7 km	MPC · JPL
526116	2005 UV_{459}	—	October 1, 2005	Mount Lemmon	Mount Lemmon Survey	·	1.0 km	MPC · JPL
526117	2005 UT_{461}	—	October 7, 2005	Mount Lemmon	Mount Lemmon Survey	·	1.2 km	MPC · JPL
526118	2005 UR_{462}	—	October 30, 2005	Kitt Peak	Spacewatch	·	2.9 km	MPC · JPL
526119	2005 UG_{463}	—	October 30, 2005	Kitt Peak	Spacewatch	NYS	1.6 km	MPC · JPL
526120	2005 UJ_{464}	—	May 12, 2004	Catalina	CSS	·	1.3 km	MPC · JPL
526121	2005 UM_{464}	—	October 30, 2005	Kitt Peak	Spacewatch	·	2.7 km	MPC · JPL
526122	2005 UP_{465}	—	October 30, 2005	Kitt Peak	Spacewatch	·	2.1 km	MPC · JPL
526123	2005 UG_{467}	—	October 30, 2005	Kitt Peak	Spacewatch	·	460 m	MPC · JPL
526124	2005 UO_{471}	—	October 22, 2005	Kitt Peak	Spacewatch	·	1.3 km	MPC · JPL
526125	2005 UT_{475}	—	October 22, 2005	Catalina	CSS	·	1.3 km	MPC · JPL
526126	2005 UK_{485}	—	October 22, 2005	Catalina	CSS	·	1.3 km	MPC · JPL
526127	2005 UY_{492}	—	October 10, 2005	Catalina	CSS	JUN	760 m	MPC · JPL
526128	2005 UQ_{499}	—	October 27, 2005	Catalina	CSS	·	1.6 km	MPC · JPL
526129	2005 UW_{501}	—	October 1, 2005	Catalina	CSS	ADE	1.8 km	MPC · JPL
526130	2005 UA_{520}	—	October 26, 2005	Apache Point	A. C. Becker	MAS	540 m	MPC · JPL
526131	2005 UX_{525}	—	October 27, 2005	Mount Lemmon	Mount Lemmon Survey	·	1.8 km	MPC · JPL
526132	2005 UZ_{525}	—	October 28, 2005	Mount Lemmon	Mount Lemmon Survey	·	1.2 km	MPC · JPL
526133	2005 UP_{529}	—	October 27, 2005	Kitt Peak	Spacewatch	·	540 m	MPC · JPL
526134	2005 UZ_{532}	—	October 29, 2005	Mount Lemmon	Mount Lemmon Survey	·	1.6 km	MPC · JPL
526135	2005 UB_{533}	—	October 25, 2005	Mount Lemmon	Mount Lemmon Survey	·	1.4 km	MPC · JPL
526136	2005 UC_{533}	—	October 25, 2005	Mount Lemmon	Mount Lemmon Survey	·	600 m	MPC · JPL
526137	2005 UK_{533}	—	October 28, 2005	Catalina	CSS	HNS	1.3 km	MPC · JPL
526138	2005 UL_{533}	—	October 5, 2005	Catalina	CSS	(5)	920 m	MPC · JPL
526139	2005 UN_{533}	—	October 28, 2005	Mount Lemmon	Mount Lemmon Survey	·	540 m	MPC · JPL
526140	2005 VO_{2}	—	September 30, 2005	Catalina	CSS	H	510 m	MPC · JPL
526141	2005 VC_{5}	—	November 8, 2005	Piszkéstető	K. Sárneczky	·	950 m	MPC · JPL
526142	2005 VE_{19}	—	October 25, 2005	Kitt Peak	Spacewatch	·	1.1 km	MPC · JPL
526143	2005 VC_{25}	—	November 1, 2005	Kitt Peak	Spacewatch	·	1.2 km	MPC · JPL
526144	2005 VL_{28}	—	October 31, 2005	Socorro	LINEAR	·	1.5 km	MPC · JPL
526145	2005 VJ_{35}	—	October 6, 2005	Mount Lemmon	Mount Lemmon Survey	·	1.0 km	MPC · JPL
526146	2005 VN_{42}	—	November 3, 2005	Mount Lemmon	Mount Lemmon Survey	·	2.0 km	MPC · JPL
526147	2005 VW_{45}	—	October 25, 2005	Kitt Peak	Spacewatch	·	1.5 km	MPC · JPL
526148	2005 VX_{49}	—	October 23, 2005	Catalina	CSS	·	3.2 km	MPC · JPL
526149	2005 VR_{51}	—	October 22, 2005	Catalina	CSS	·	1.9 km	MPC · JPL
526150	2005 VK_{69}	—	November 1, 2005	Mount Lemmon	Mount Lemmon Survey	·	800 m	MPC · JPL
526151	2005 VE_{80}	—	October 29, 2005	Catalina	CSS	·	1.5 km	MPC · JPL
526152	2005 VR_{83}	—	November 3, 2005	Mount Lemmon	Mount Lemmon Survey	·	860 m	MPC · JPL
526153	2005 VW_{95}	—	October 25, 2005	Mount Lemmon	Mount Lemmon Survey	H	430 m	MPC · JPL
526154	2005 VY_{98}	—	November 10, 2005	Catalina	CSS	·	1.9 km	MPC · JPL
526155	2005 VG_{102}	—	October 10, 2005	Catalina	CSS	·	2.0 km	MPC · JPL
526156	2005 VU_{102}	—	October 3, 2005	Catalina	CSS	slow	1.3 km	MPC · JPL
526157	2005 VM_{106}	—	October 24, 2005	Kitt Peak	Spacewatch	·	1.4 km	MPC · JPL
526158	2005 VO_{111}	—	November 6, 2005	Mount Lemmon	Mount Lemmon Survey	H	490 m	MPC · JPL
526159	2005 VO_{114}	—	November 10, 2005	Catalina	CSS	·	1.0 km	MPC · JPL
526160	2005 VL_{134}	—	November 3, 2005	Kitt Peak	Spacewatch	·	1.0 km	MPC · JPL
526161	2005 VF_{138}	—	November 1, 2005	Mount Lemmon	Mount Lemmon Survey	·	1.8 km	MPC · JPL
526162	2005 VH_{138}	—	November 1, 2005	Mount Lemmon	Mount Lemmon Survey	·	1.3 km	MPC · JPL
526163	2005 VJ_{138}	—	November 1, 2005	Mount Lemmon	Mount Lemmon Survey	·	1.1 km	MPC · JPL
526164	2005 VK_{138}	—	November 3, 2005	Catalina	CSS	(194)	1.6 km	MPC · JPL
526165	2005 WA_{5}	—	November 2, 2005	Catalina	CSS	·	1.2 km	MPC · JPL
526166	2005 WG_{12}	—	October 25, 2005	Mount Lemmon	Mount Lemmon Survey	·	2.4 km	MPC · JPL
526167	2005 WW_{12}	—	November 22, 2005	Kitt Peak	Spacewatch	·	1.3 km	MPC · JPL
526168	2005 WF_{15}	—	November 3, 2005	Kitt Peak	Spacewatch	·	450 m	MPC · JPL
526169	2005 WP_{21}	—	November 21, 2005	Kitt Peak	Spacewatch	·	500 m	MPC · JPL
526170	2005 WT_{24}	—	November 12, 2005	Kitt Peak	Spacewatch	·	1.3 km	MPC · JPL
526171	2005 WP_{26}	—	November 21, 2005	Kitt Peak	Spacewatch	·	1.3 km	MPC · JPL
526172	2005 WM_{28}	—	November 21, 2005	Kitt Peak	Spacewatch	·	940 m	MPC · JPL
526173	2005 WV_{30}	—	November 21, 2005	Kitt Peak	Spacewatch	·	770 m	MPC · JPL
526174	2005 WZ_{30}	—	November 21, 2005	Kitt Peak	Spacewatch	·	510 m	MPC · JPL
526175	2005 WR_{31}	—	November 21, 2005	Kitt Peak	Spacewatch	·	1.6 km	MPC · JPL
526176	2005 WF_{32}	—	November 21, 2005	Kitt Peak	Spacewatch	·	1.3 km	MPC · JPL
526177	2005 WL_{32}	—	November 21, 2005	Kitt Peak	Spacewatch	·	2.8 km	MPC · JPL
526178	2005 WW_{35}	—	November 22, 2005	Kitt Peak	Spacewatch	·	3.5 km	MPC · JPL
526179	2005 WW_{42}	—	November 21, 2005	Kitt Peak	Spacewatch	(5)	880 m	MPC · JPL
526180	2005 WV_{44}	—	October 28, 2005	Mount Lemmon	Mount Lemmon Survey	·	1.0 km	MPC · JPL
526181	2005 WM_{52}	—	October 31, 2005	Catalina	CSS	·	2.2 km	MPC · JPL
526182	2005 WG_{53}	—	November 25, 2005	Mount Lemmon	Mount Lemmon Survey	·	1.2 km	MPC · JPL
526183	2005 WX_{56}	—	November 10, 2005	Mount Lemmon	Mount Lemmon Survey	GAL	1.5 km	MPC · JPL
526184	2005 WP_{58}	—	November 26, 2005	Mount Lemmon	Mount Lemmon Survey	·	1.4 km	MPC · JPL
526185	2005 WQ_{59}	—	November 12, 2005	Kitt Peak	Spacewatch	·	1.6 km	MPC · JPL
526186	2005 WT_{69}	—	November 26, 2005	Kitt Peak	Spacewatch	·	1.4 km	MPC · JPL
526187	2005 WN_{76}	—	November 6, 2005	Mount Lemmon	Mount Lemmon Survey	·	1.7 km	MPC · JPL
526188	2005 WT_{81}	—	November 28, 2005	Kitt Peak	Spacewatch	·	1.2 km	MPC · JPL
526189	2005 WV_{82}	—	November 25, 2005	Mount Lemmon	Mount Lemmon Survey	·	630 m	MPC · JPL
526190	2005 WY_{86}	—	November 28, 2005	Catalina	CSS	·	1.4 km	MPC · JPL
526191	2005 WY_{90}	—	October 24, 2005	Kitt Peak	Spacewatch	·	1.4 km	MPC · JPL
526192	2005 WO_{95}	—	November 26, 2005	Kitt Peak	Spacewatch	·	1.5 km	MPC · JPL
526193	2005 WD_{102}	—	November 29, 2005	Socorro	LINEAR	·	1.0 km	MPC · JPL
526194	2005 WQ_{115}	—	October 29, 2005	Kitt Peak	Spacewatch	·	390 m	MPC · JPL
526195	2005 WP_{116}	—	November 30, 2005	Kitt Peak	Spacewatch	JUN	1.2 km	MPC · JPL
526196	2005 WV_{121}	—	November 4, 2005	Mount Lemmon	Mount Lemmon Survey	JUN	940 m	MPC · JPL
526197	2005 WP_{122}	—	November 25, 2005	Mount Lemmon	Mount Lemmon Survey	VER	2.4 km	MPC · JPL
526198	2005 WM_{125}	—	November 25, 2005	Mount Lemmon	Mount Lemmon Survey	·	1.2 km	MPC · JPL
526199	2005 WN_{132}	—	November 25, 2005	Mount Lemmon	Mount Lemmon Survey	·	1.2 km	MPC · JPL
526200	2005 WQ_{139}	—	November 26, 2005	Mount Lemmon	Mount Lemmon Survey	·	1.7 km	MPC · JPL

== 526201–526300 ==
back to top

Designation			Discovery			Properties		Ref
Permanent	Provisional	Named after	Date	Site	Discoverer(s)	Category	Diam.	Ref
526201	2005 WC_{142}	—	October 1, 2005	Kitt Peak	Spacewatch	·	3.4 km	MPC · JPL
526202	2005 WZ_{143}	—	November 22, 2005	Kitt Peak	Spacewatch	H	470 m	MPC · JPL
526203	2005 WF_{151}	—	November 28, 2005	Kitt Peak	Spacewatch	·	2.0 km	MPC · JPL
526204	2005 WB_{159}	—	November 28, 2005	Socorro	LINEAR	·	1.9 km	MPC · JPL
526205	2005 WJ_{176}	—	November 30, 2005	Kitt Peak	Spacewatch	JUN	1.0 km	MPC · JPL
526206	2005 WD_{183}	—	November 2, 2005	Socorro	LINEAR	·	1.3 km	MPC · JPL
526207	2005 WF_{190}	—	November 5, 2005	Catalina	CSS	·	1.4 km	MPC · JPL
526208	2005 WT_{191}	—	November 25, 2005	Catalina	CSS	·	1.6 km	MPC · JPL
526209	2005 WG_{192}	—	October 31, 2005	Catalina	CSS	·	1.7 km	MPC · JPL
526210	2005 WL_{192}	—	October 25, 2005	Mount Lemmon	Mount Lemmon Survey	H	500 m	MPC · JPL
526211	2005 XA_{12}	—	December 1, 2005	Socorro	LINEAR	JUN	740 m	MPC · JPL
526212	2005 XW_{21}	—	November 21, 2005	Catalina	CSS	·	2.0 km	MPC · JPL
526213	2005 XD_{30}	—	December 1, 2005	Mount Lemmon	Mount Lemmon Survey	·	2.2 km	MPC · JPL
526214	2005 XP_{30}	—	December 1, 2005	Kitt Peak	Spacewatch	·	1.3 km	MPC · JPL
526215	2005 XE_{34}	—	December 4, 2005	Kitt Peak	Spacewatch	·	1.6 km	MPC · JPL
526216	2005 XP_{34}	—	December 1, 2005	Socorro	LINEAR	·	1.9 km	MPC · JPL
526217	2005 XV_{36}	—	December 4, 2005	Kitt Peak	Spacewatch	NEM	1.9 km	MPC · JPL
526218	2005 XT_{48}	—	December 2, 2005	Mount Lemmon	Mount Lemmon Survey	·	960 m	MPC · JPL
526219	2005 XB_{50}	—	December 2, 2005	Kitt Peak	Spacewatch	·	1.8 km	MPC · JPL
526220	2005 XU_{52}	—	December 2, 2005	Kitt Peak	Spacewatch	·	1.3 km	MPC · JPL
526221	2005 XY_{58}	—	December 3, 2005	Kitt Peak	Spacewatch	·	1.3 km	MPC · JPL
526222	2005 XM_{60}	—	December 4, 2005	Kitt Peak	Spacewatch	H	470 m	MPC · JPL
526223	2005 XR_{70}	—	December 6, 2005	Kitt Peak	Spacewatch	·	1.6 km	MPC · JPL
526224	2005 XZ_{80}	—	December 7, 2005	Kitt Peak	Spacewatch	EUN	1.1 km	MPC · JPL
526225	2005 XY_{96}	—	November 6, 2005	Mount Lemmon	Mount Lemmon Survey	EUN	840 m	MPC · JPL
526226	2005 YN_{2}	—	September 30, 2005	Mount Lemmon	Mount Lemmon Survey	·	1.1 km	MPC · JPL
526227	2005 YZ_{7}	—	December 22, 2005	Kitt Peak	Spacewatch	·	870 m	MPC · JPL
526228	2005 YP_{12}	—	December 21, 2005	Kitt Peak	Spacewatch	·	2.0 km	MPC · JPL
526229	2005 YG_{13}	—	December 22, 2005	Kitt Peak	Spacewatch	·	1.3 km	MPC · JPL
526230	2005 YU_{14}	—	December 22, 2005	Kitt Peak	Spacewatch	·	1.4 km	MPC · JPL
526231	2005 YV_{14}	—	December 22, 2005	Kitt Peak	Spacewatch	·	1.7 km	MPC · JPL
526232	2005 YF_{17}	—	November 30, 2005	Mount Lemmon	Mount Lemmon Survey	(5)	1.2 km	MPC · JPL
526233	2005 YA_{21}	—	December 2, 2005	Mount Lemmon	Mount Lemmon Survey	·	1.3 km	MPC · JPL
526234	2005 YH_{25}	—	December 24, 2005	Kitt Peak	Spacewatch	·	1.4 km	MPC · JPL
526235	2005 YV_{27}	—	December 22, 2005	Kitt Peak	Spacewatch	·	1.6 km	MPC · JPL
526236	2005 YV_{34}	—	December 24, 2005	Kitt Peak	Spacewatch	HNS	1.5 km	MPC · JPL
526237	2005 YF_{36}	—	December 25, 2005	Kitt Peak	Spacewatch	GAL	1.4 km	MPC · JPL
526238	2005 YY_{36}	—	December 25, 2005	Catalina	CSS	AMO	440 m	MPC · JPL
526239	2005 YG_{47}	—	December 25, 2005	Kitt Peak	Spacewatch	H	340 m	MPC · JPL
526240	2005 YL_{59}	—	December 26, 2005	Mount Lemmon	Mount Lemmon Survey	·	1.6 km	MPC · JPL
526241	2005 YV_{64}	—	October 30, 2005	Mount Lemmon	Mount Lemmon Survey	·	1.6 km	MPC · JPL
526242	2005 YU_{82}	—	December 24, 2005	Kitt Peak	Spacewatch	CLO	1.5 km	MPC · JPL
526243	2005 YM_{84}	—	December 24, 2005	Kitt Peak	Spacewatch	·	800 m	MPC · JPL
526244	2005 YR_{92}	—	December 2, 2005	Mount Lemmon	Mount Lemmon Survey	·	1.7 km	MPC · JPL
526245	2005 YA_{93}	—	December 27, 2005	Kitt Peak	Spacewatch	EUN	960 m	MPC · JPL
526246	2005 YG_{97}	—	December 24, 2005	Kitt Peak	Spacewatch	·	1.6 km	MPC · JPL
526247	2005 YY_{97}	—	December 24, 2005	Kitt Peak	Spacewatch	H	510 m	MPC · JPL
526248	2005 YD_{98}	—	December 2, 2005	Mount Lemmon	Mount Lemmon Survey	·	1.9 km	MPC · JPL
526249	2005 YW_{114}	—	December 25, 2005	Kitt Peak	Spacewatch	JUN	650 m	MPC · JPL
526250	2005 YB_{115}	—	December 25, 2005	Kitt Peak	Spacewatch	HNS	1.4 km	MPC · JPL
526251	2005 YY_{117}	—	December 25, 2005	Kitt Peak	Spacewatch	·	1.3 km	MPC · JPL
526252	2005 YO_{124}	—	December 26, 2005	Kitt Peak	Spacewatch	·	1.4 km	MPC · JPL
526253	2005 YV_{124}	—	December 26, 2005	Kitt Peak	Spacewatch	·	1.4 km	MPC · JPL
526254	2005 YZ_{125}	—	December 26, 2005	Kitt Peak	Spacewatch	·	480 m	MPC · JPL
526255	2005 YP_{128}	—	December 30, 2005	Mount Lemmon	Mount Lemmon Survey	·	1.7 km	MPC · JPL
526256	2005 YW_{128}	—	December 5, 2005	Socorro	LINEAR	H	530 m	MPC · JPL
526257	2005 YT_{135}	—	December 26, 2005	Kitt Peak	Spacewatch	·	790 m	MPC · JPL
526258	2005 YS_{137}	—	December 26, 2005	Kitt Peak	Spacewatch	·	1.0 km	MPC · JPL
526259	2005 YH_{140}	—	December 28, 2005	Mount Lemmon	Mount Lemmon Survey	BRG	2.0 km	MPC · JPL
526260	2005 YU_{158}	—	December 27, 2005	Kitt Peak	Spacewatch	·	650 m	MPC · JPL
526261	2005 YS_{166}	—	December 27, 2005	Kitt Peak	Spacewatch	(5)	680 m	MPC · JPL
526262	2005 YV_{166}	—	December 1, 2005	Mount Lemmon	Mount Lemmon Survey	CYB	3.1 km	MPC · JPL
526263	2005 YM_{172}	—	December 23, 2005	Catalina	CSS	·	1.6 km	MPC · JPL
526264	2005 YQ_{180}	—	November 12, 2005	Kitt Peak	Spacewatch	JUN	1.2 km	MPC · JPL
526265	2005 YF_{188}	—	December 28, 2005	Kitt Peak	Spacewatch	·	1.3 km	MPC · JPL
526266	2005 YG_{193}	—	December 30, 2005	Kitt Peak	Spacewatch	·	1.7 km	MPC · JPL
526267	2005 YR_{193}	—	December 30, 2005	Kitt Peak	Spacewatch	·	1.4 km	MPC · JPL
526268	2005 YH_{196}	—	December 24, 2005	Kitt Peak	Spacewatch	·	1.7 km	MPC · JPL
526269	2005 YX_{202}	—	December 5, 2005	Mount Lemmon	Mount Lemmon Survey	·	1.4 km	MPC · JPL
526270	2005 YD_{207}	—	November 30, 2005	Mount Lemmon	Mount Lemmon Survey	·	2.1 km	MPC · JPL
526271	2005 YO_{230}	—	December 26, 2005	Kitt Peak	Spacewatch	·	2.0 km	MPC · JPL
526272	2006 AD_{13}	—	November 30, 2005	Kitt Peak	Spacewatch	·	2.4 km	MPC · JPL
526273	2006 AY_{33}	—	January 6, 2006	Catalina	CSS	BAR	1.2 km	MPC · JPL
526274	2006 AF_{35}	—	January 4, 2006	Kitt Peak	Spacewatch	H	470 m	MPC · JPL
526275	2006 AS_{37}	—	December 25, 2005	Mount Lemmon	Mount Lemmon Survey	·	760 m	MPC · JPL
526276	2006 AW_{46}	—	December 2, 2005	Mount Lemmon	Mount Lemmon Survey	GAL	1.2 km	MPC · JPL
526277	2006 AX_{53}	—	January 5, 2006	Kitt Peak	Spacewatch	·	1.2 km	MPC · JPL
526278	2006 AE_{60}	—	January 5, 2006	Kitt Peak	Spacewatch	·	620 m	MPC · JPL
526279	2006 AK_{60}	—	December 28, 2005	Kitt Peak	Spacewatch	·	920 m	MPC · JPL
526280	2006 AP_{64}	—	January 8, 2006	Kitt Peak	Spacewatch	·	1.5 km	MPC · JPL
526281	2006 AX_{69}	—	December 28, 2005	Mount Lemmon	Mount Lemmon Survey	·	1.4 km	MPC · JPL
526282	2006 AA_{89}	—	January 5, 2006	Mount Lemmon	Mount Lemmon Survey	·	1.2 km	MPC · JPL
526283	2006 AA_{90}	—	January 5, 2006	Mount Lemmon	Mount Lemmon Survey	·	770 m	MPC · JPL
526284	2006 AB_{90}	—	January 5, 2006	Mount Lemmon	Mount Lemmon Survey	EUN	1.0 km	MPC · JPL
526285	2006 AE_{100}	—	December 24, 2005	Kitt Peak	Spacewatch	·	2.9 km	MPC · JPL
526286	2006 AY_{107}	—	January 4, 2006	Kitt Peak	Spacewatch	H	530 m	MPC · JPL
526287	2006 AD_{108}	—	January 7, 2006	Mount Lemmon	Mount Lemmon Survey	·	900 m	MPC · JPL
526288	2006 AL_{108}	—	January 7, 2006	Mount Lemmon	Mount Lemmon Survey	·	1.4 km	MPC · JPL
526289	2006 BT_{10}	—	January 20, 2006	Kitt Peak	Spacewatch	JUN	830 m	MPC · JPL
526290	2006 BE_{13}	—	January 21, 2006	Mount Lemmon	Mount Lemmon Survey	H	460 m	MPC · JPL
526291	2006 BQ_{13}	—	August 25, 2004	Kitt Peak	Spacewatch	·	1.4 km	MPC · JPL
526292	2006 BQ_{16}	—	December 24, 2005	Kitt Peak	Spacewatch	·	1.5 km	MPC · JPL
526293	2006 BL_{20}	—	December 25, 2005	Mount Lemmon	Mount Lemmon Survey	·	1.4 km	MPC · JPL
526294	2006 BX_{30}	—	January 20, 2006	Kitt Peak	Spacewatch	JUN	720 m	MPC · JPL
526295	2006 BE_{43}	—	January 23, 2006	Kitt Peak	Spacewatch	·	1.1 km	MPC · JPL
526296	2006 BD_{52}	—	January 25, 2006	Kitt Peak	Spacewatch	·	1.3 km	MPC · JPL
526297	2006 BE_{63}	—	January 21, 2006	Kitt Peak	Spacewatch	HNS	930 m	MPC · JPL
526298	2006 BP_{64}	—	January 22, 2006	Mount Lemmon	Mount Lemmon Survey	AEO	880 m	MPC · JPL
526299	2006 BY_{69}	—	January 23, 2006	Kitt Peak	Spacewatch	BRG	1.3 km	MPC · JPL
526300	2006 BJ_{74}	—	January 23, 2006	Kitt Peak	Spacewatch	·	1.3 km	MPC · JPL

== 526301–526400 ==
back to top

Designation			Discovery			Properties		Ref
Permanent	Provisional	Named after	Date	Site	Discoverer(s)	Category	Diam.	Ref
526301	2006 BZ_{79}	—	January 23, 2006	Kitt Peak	Spacewatch	·	2.3 km	MPC · JPL
526302	2006 BZ_{86}	—	January 25, 2006	Kitt Peak	Spacewatch	·	1.9 km	MPC · JPL
526303	2006 BJ_{88}	—	January 25, 2006	Kitt Peak	Spacewatch	·	1.2 km	MPC · JPL
526304	2006 BJ_{90}	—	January 25, 2006	Kitt Peak	Spacewatch	·	1.8 km	MPC · JPL
526305	2006 BB_{91}	—	January 8, 2006	Mount Lemmon	Mount Lemmon Survey	·	1.5 km	MPC · JPL
526306	2006 BC_{95}	—	January 26, 2006	Kitt Peak	Spacewatch	JUN	690 m	MPC · JPL
526307	2006 BP_{97}	—	January 27, 2006	Mount Lemmon	Mount Lemmon Survey	·	790 m	MPC · JPL
526308	2006 BF_{100}	—	January 10, 2006	Kitt Peak	Spacewatch	·	1.0 km	MPC · JPL
526309	2006 BS_{113}	—	January 25, 2006	Kitt Peak	Spacewatch	MRX	860 m	MPC · JPL
526310	2006 BF_{126}	—	January 26, 2006	Kitt Peak	Spacewatch	·	1.6 km	MPC · JPL
526311	2006 BE_{137}	—	January 5, 2006	Mount Lemmon	Mount Lemmon Survey	·	1.4 km	MPC · JPL
526312	2006 BO_{141}	—	January 25, 2006	Kitt Peak	Spacewatch	·	1.9 km	MPC · JPL
526313	2006 BW_{150}	—	January 9, 2006	Kitt Peak	Spacewatch	PAD	1.6 km	MPC · JPL
526314	2006 BS_{156}	—	January 25, 2006	Kitt Peak	Spacewatch	EUN	840 m	MPC · JPL
526315	2006 BZ_{167}	—	January 9, 2006	Mount Lemmon	Mount Lemmon Survey	H	490 m	MPC · JPL
526316	2006 BH_{169}	—	January 26, 2006	Kitt Peak	Spacewatch	L5	8.2 km	MPC · JPL
526317	2006 BO_{169}	—	January 26, 2006	Mount Lemmon	Mount Lemmon Survey	MIS	1.7 km	MPC · JPL
526318	2006 BG_{175}	—	January 27, 2006	Kitt Peak	Spacewatch	·	1.3 km	MPC · JPL
526319	2006 BA_{186}	—	January 28, 2006	Mount Lemmon	Mount Lemmon Survey	GEF	1.0 km	MPC · JPL
526320	2006 BL_{202}	—	January 23, 2006	Kitt Peak	Spacewatch	H	460 m	MPC · JPL
526321	2006 BK_{206}	—	January 31, 2006	Mount Lemmon	Mount Lemmon Survey	HOF	2.3 km	MPC · JPL
526322	2006 BU_{211}	—	January 31, 2006	Kitt Peak	Spacewatch	JUN	890 m	MPC · JPL
526323	2006 BP_{213}	—	January 22, 2006	Catalina	CSS	·	1.6 km	MPC · JPL
526324	2006 BB_{217}	—	January 27, 2006	Anderson Mesa	LONEOS	·	1.3 km	MPC · JPL
526325	2006 BD_{222}	—	January 7, 2006	Mount Lemmon	Mount Lemmon Survey	·	1.7 km	MPC · JPL
526326	2006 BA_{228}	—	January 30, 2006	Kitt Peak	Spacewatch	H	530 m	MPC · JPL
526327	2006 BJ_{236}	—	January 23, 2006	Kitt Peak	Spacewatch	·	1.7 km	MPC · JPL
526328	2006 BC_{239}	—	January 2, 2006	Mount Lemmon	Mount Lemmon Survey	·	1.3 km	MPC · JPL
526329	2006 BJ_{270}	—	January 8, 2006	Mount Lemmon	Mount Lemmon Survey	·	1.5 km	MPC · JPL
526330	2006 BH_{278}	—	January 22, 2006	Mount Lemmon	Mount Lemmon Survey	·	1.0 km	MPC · JPL
526331	2006 BF_{286}	—	January 22, 2006	Mount Lemmon	Mount Lemmon Survey	·	640 m	MPC · JPL
526332	2006 BJ_{286}	—	January 22, 2006	Mount Lemmon	Mount Lemmon Survey	·	1.8 km	MPC · JPL
526333	2006 BK_{286}	—	January 23, 2006	Mount Lemmon	Mount Lemmon Survey	·	560 m	MPC · JPL
526334	2006 BL_{286}	—	January 23, 2006	Mount Lemmon	Mount Lemmon Survey	·	650 m	MPC · JPL
526335	2006 BO_{286}	—	January 28, 2006	Anderson Mesa	LONEOS	H	400 m	MPC · JPL
526336	2006 CP	—	February 3, 2006	Socorro	LINEAR	·	750 m	MPC · JPL
526337	2006 CU_{3}	—	January 9, 2006	Kitt Peak	Spacewatch	·	870 m	MPC · JPL
526338	2006 CO_{23}	—	February 2, 2006	Kitt Peak	Spacewatch	·	1.8 km	MPC · JPL
526339	2006 CQ_{23}	—	January 25, 2006	Kitt Peak	Spacewatch	·	1.1 km	MPC · JPL
526340	2006 CX_{24}	—	January 22, 2006	Mount Lemmon	Mount Lemmon Survey	·	450 m	MPC · JPL
526341	2006 CG_{27}	—	January 22, 2006	Mount Lemmon	Mount Lemmon Survey	·	610 m	MPC · JPL
526342	2006 CE_{32}	—	February 2, 2006	Kitt Peak	Spacewatch	·	1.1 km	MPC · JPL
526343	2006 CG_{44}	—	January 22, 2006	Mount Lemmon	Mount Lemmon Survey	·	1.6 km	MPC · JPL
526344	2006 CX_{45}	—	January 22, 2006	Mount Lemmon	Mount Lemmon Survey	·	1.1 km	MPC · JPL
526345	2006 CS_{50}	—	January 22, 2006	Mount Lemmon	Mount Lemmon Survey	·	1.7 km	MPC · JPL
526346	2006 CH_{64}	—	January 22, 2006	Mount Lemmon	Mount Lemmon Survey	·	1.3 km	MPC · JPL
526347	2006 CV_{64}	—	November 30, 2005	Kitt Peak	Spacewatch	·	1 km	MPC · JPL
526348	2006 CX_{64}	—	December 7, 2005	Kitt Peak	Spacewatch	·	2.1 km	MPC · JPL
526349	2006 CD_{71}	—	September 9, 2008	Mount Lemmon	Mount Lemmon Survey	·	1.4 km	MPC · JPL
526350	2006 CK_{81}	—	January 8, 2006	Mount Lemmon	Mount Lemmon Survey	·	1.3 km	MPC · JPL
526351	2006 DP_{23}	—	February 20, 2006	Kitt Peak	Spacewatch	H	420 m	MPC · JPL
526352	2006 DO_{24}	—	February 4, 2006	Kitt Peak	Spacewatch	·	1.7 km	MPC · JPL
526353	2006 DY_{26}	—	February 20, 2006	Kitt Peak	Spacewatch	·	1.4 km	MPC · JPL
526354	2006 DU_{36}	—	February 7, 2006	Mount Lemmon	Mount Lemmon Survey	·	750 m	MPC · JPL
526355	2006 DN_{45}	—	January 30, 2006	Kitt Peak	Spacewatch	·	960 m	MPC · JPL
526356	2006 DW_{68}	—	February 1, 2006	Catalina	CSS	PHO	1.0 km	MPC · JPL
526357	2006 DF_{73}	—	February 22, 2006	Anderson Mesa	LONEOS	·	1.5 km	MPC · JPL
526358	2006 DS_{89}	—	February 24, 2006	Mount Lemmon	Mount Lemmon Survey	·	950 m	MPC · JPL
526359	2006 DW_{91}	—	February 24, 2006	Mount Lemmon	Mount Lemmon Survey	·	1.1 km	MPC · JPL
526360	2006 DX_{92}	—	February 24, 2006	Kitt Peak	Spacewatch	·	1.0 km	MPC · JPL
526361	2006 DF_{95}	—	February 24, 2006	Kitt Peak	Spacewatch	H	430 m	MPC · JPL
526362	2006 DK_{98}	—	February 25, 2006	Kitt Peak	Spacewatch	H	470 m	MPC · JPL
526363	2006 DH_{107}	—	February 25, 2006	Mount Lemmon	Mount Lemmon Survey	·	1.5 km	MPC · JPL
526364	2006 DB_{108}	—	February 25, 2006	Kitt Peak	Spacewatch	·	1.2 km	MPC · JPL
526365	2006 DL_{112}	—	February 27, 2006	Mount Lemmon	Mount Lemmon Survey	·	1.0 km	MPC · JPL
526366	2006 DU_{117}	—	February 27, 2006	Kitt Peak	Spacewatch	·	520 m	MPC · JPL
526367	2006 DV_{121}	—	February 22, 2006	Anderson Mesa	LONEOS	·	1.7 km	MPC · JPL
526368	2006 DD_{124}	—	February 6, 2006	Kitt Peak	Spacewatch	·	1.3 km	MPC · JPL
526369	2006 DK_{134}	—	January 31, 2006	Kitt Peak	Spacewatch	·	1.5 km	MPC · JPL
526370	2006 DX_{136}	—	February 25, 2006	Kitt Peak	Spacewatch	EUN	880 m	MPC · JPL
526371	2006 DC_{142}	—	February 25, 2006	Kitt Peak	Spacewatch	(18466)	1.9 km	MPC · JPL
526372	2006 DJ_{205}	—	January 31, 2006	Kitt Peak	Spacewatch	MIS	2.2 km	MPC · JPL
526373	2006 DZ_{205}	—	February 2, 2006	Mount Lemmon	Mount Lemmon Survey	·	690 m	MPC · JPL
526374	2006 DM_{213}	—	January 26, 2006	Mount Lemmon	Mount Lemmon Survey	L5	6.9 km	MPC · JPL
526375	2006 DM_{216}	—	February 20, 2006	Mount Lemmon	Mount Lemmon Survey	(18466)	2.1 km	MPC · JPL
526376	2006 DG_{219}	—	September 12, 2004	Kitt Peak	Spacewatch	·	610 m	MPC · JPL
526377	2006 DN_{219}	—	February 25, 2006	Kitt Peak	Spacewatch	·	1.6 km	MPC · JPL
526378	2006 EL_{7}	—	February 24, 2006	Kitt Peak	Spacewatch	·	1.9 km	MPC · JPL
526379	2006 EJ_{15}	—	March 2, 2006	Kitt Peak	Spacewatch	·	1.6 km	MPC · JPL
526380	2006 EH_{18}	—	March 2, 2006	Kitt Peak	Spacewatch	·	1.7 km	MPC · JPL
526381	2006 EJ_{31}	—	March 3, 2006	Kitt Peak	Spacewatch	JUN	910 m	MPC · JPL
526382	2006 EE_{45}	—	March 4, 2006	Catalina	CSS	·	2.6 km	MPC · JPL
526383	2006 EQ_{46}	—	January 7, 2006	Mount Lemmon	Mount Lemmon Survey	·	1.5 km	MPC · JPL
526384	2006 EE_{66}	—	March 5, 2006	Kitt Peak	Spacewatch	BAR	1.2 km	MPC · JPL
526385	2006 FP_{15}	—	April 12, 2002	Socorro	LINEAR	·	2.2 km	MPC · JPL
526386	2006 FK_{30}	—	March 25, 2006	Eskridge	Farpoint	·	1.3 km	MPC · JPL
526387	2006 FG_{42}	—	March 26, 2006	Kitt Peak	Spacewatch	·	2.1 km	MPC · JPL
526388	2006 FW_{55}	—	March 25, 2006	Mount Lemmon	Mount Lemmon Survey	3:2	5.3 km	MPC · JPL
526389	2006 FG_{56}	—	March 26, 2006	Mount Lemmon	Mount Lemmon Survey	V	790 m	MPC · JPL
526390	2006 GW_{30}	—	April 2, 2006	Catalina	CSS	·	1.5 km	MPC · JPL
526391	2006 GT_{31}	—	April 4, 2006	Eskridge	Farpoint	ADE	1.5 km	MPC · JPL
526392	2006 GM_{37}	—	April 4, 2006	Lulin	Q. Ye	·	1.4 km	MPC · JPL
526393	2006 GY_{37}	—	April 8, 2006	Anderson Mesa	LONEOS	·	1.9 km	MPC · JPL
526394	2006 GJ_{39}	—	April 2, 2006	Kitt Peak	Spacewatch	H	670 m	MPC · JPL
526395	2006 GV_{55}	—	April 9, 2006	Mount Lemmon	Mount Lemmon Survey	·	540 m	MPC · JPL
526396	2006 HL_{4}	—	April 19, 2006	Mount Lemmon	Mount Lemmon Survey	·	1.2 km	MPC · JPL
526397	2006 HL_{7}	—	March 24, 2006	Kitt Peak	Spacewatch	H	540 m	MPC · JPL
526398	2006 HK_{35}	—	April 19, 2006	Mount Lemmon	Mount Lemmon Survey	·	1.7 km	MPC · JPL
526399	2006 HH_{40}	—	April 21, 2006	Kitt Peak	Spacewatch	·	1.6 km	MPC · JPL
526400	2006 HN_{48}	—	April 24, 2006	Kitt Peak	Spacewatch	·	2.2 km	MPC · JPL

== 526401–526500 ==
back to top

Designation			Discovery			Properties		Ref
Permanent	Provisional	Named after	Date	Site	Discoverer(s)	Category	Diam.	Ref
526401	2006 HR_{52}	—	April 18, 2006	Catalina	CSS	·	640 m	MPC · JPL
526402	2006 HP_{74}	—	April 25, 2006	Kitt Peak	Spacewatch	·	1.2 km	MPC · JPL
526403	2006 HN_{81}	—	April 26, 2006	Kitt Peak	Spacewatch	·	520 m	MPC · JPL
526404	2006 HZ_{98}	—	April 30, 2006	Kitt Peak	Spacewatch	·	740 m	MPC · JPL
526405	2006 HO_{113}	—	April 25, 2006	Kitt Peak	Spacewatch	·	2.0 km	MPC · JPL
526406	2006 HL_{114}	—	April 26, 2006	Kitt Peak	Spacewatch	H	450 m	MPC · JPL
526407	2006 HP_{114}	—	April 7, 2006	Kitt Peak	Spacewatch	·	1.8 km	MPC · JPL
526408	2006 HS_{130}	—	April 26, 2006	Cerro Tololo	M. W. Buie	·	1.0 km	MPC · JPL
526409	2006 HX_{154}	—	April 20, 2006	Kitt Peak	Spacewatch	·	1.1 km	MPC · JPL
526410	2006 HZ_{154}	—	April 26, 2006	Kitt Peak	Spacewatch	V	590 m	MPC · JPL
526411	2006 HA_{155}	—	April 26, 2006	Kitt Peak	Spacewatch	·	670 m	MPC · JPL
526412	2006 HC_{155}	—	April 19, 2006	Mount Lemmon	Mount Lemmon Survey	·	650 m	MPC · JPL
526413	2006 HE_{155}	—	April 24, 2006	Mount Lemmon	Mount Lemmon Survey	·	1.5 km	MPC · JPL
526414	2006 JR_{4}	—	April 8, 2006	Kitt Peak	Spacewatch	·	690 m	MPC · JPL
526415	2006 JM_{7}	—	May 1, 2006	Kitt Peak	Spacewatch	·	1.2 km	MPC · JPL
526416	2006 JB_{13}	—	May 1, 2006	Kitt Peak	Spacewatch	EUN	940 m	MPC · JPL
526417	2006 JC_{18}	—	May 2, 2006	Mount Lemmon	Mount Lemmon Survey	·	1.3 km	MPC · JPL
526418	2006 JF_{20}	—	April 24, 2006	Kitt Peak	Spacewatch	·	1.9 km	MPC · JPL
526419	2006 JB_{22}	—	May 2, 2006	Kitt Peak	Spacewatch	·	1.5 km	MPC · JPL
526420	2006 JL_{24}	—	May 4, 2006	Mount Lemmon	Mount Lemmon Survey	·	1.3 km	MPC · JPL
526421	2006 JT_{39}	—	April 26, 2006	Mount Lemmon	Mount Lemmon Survey	·	3.0 km	MPC · JPL
526422	2006 JL_{50}	—	November 18, 2003	Kitt Peak	Spacewatch	·	2.1 km	MPC · JPL
526423	2006 JS_{61}	—	April 9, 2006	Kitt Peak	Spacewatch	·	1.5 km	MPC · JPL
526424	2006 JD_{63}	—	February 7, 2006	Kitt Peak	Spacewatch	MIS	2.2 km	MPC · JPL
526425	2006 JK_{82}	—	May 2, 2006	Mount Lemmon	Mount Lemmon Survey	·	540 m	MPC · JPL
526426	2006 JN_{82}	—	May 6, 2006	Mount Lemmon	Mount Lemmon Survey	·	740 m	MPC · JPL
526427	2006 JO_{82}	—	May 7, 2006	Mount Lemmon	Mount Lemmon Survey	·	1.9 km	MPC · JPL
526428	2006 KX_{11}	—	May 20, 2006	Kitt Peak	Spacewatch	(1547)	1.1 km	MPC · JPL
526429	2006 KU_{12}	—	May 20, 2006	Kitt Peak	Spacewatch	·	1.2 km	MPC · JPL
526430	2006 KZ_{17}	—	May 21, 2006	Kitt Peak	Spacewatch	H	560 m	MPC · JPL
526431	2006 KF_{21}	—	May 21, 2006	Kitt Peak	Spacewatch	·	1.4 km	MPC · JPL
526432	2006 KG_{23}	—	May 23, 2006	Mount Lemmon	Mount Lemmon Survey	·	1.9 km	MPC · JPL
526433	2006 KQ_{45}	—	May 21, 2006	Mount Lemmon	Mount Lemmon Survey	·	500 m	MPC · JPL
526434	2006 KB_{47}	—	May 21, 2006	Mount Lemmon	Mount Lemmon Survey	·	1.3 km	MPC · JPL
526435	2006 KY_{47}	—	May 21, 2006	Kitt Peak	Spacewatch	·	2.1 km	MPC · JPL
526436	2006 KS_{52}	—	May 7, 2006	Mount Lemmon	Mount Lemmon Survey	·	3.1 km	MPC · JPL
526437	2006 KQ_{61}	—	May 22, 2006	Kitt Peak	Spacewatch	·	2.1 km	MPC · JPL
526438	2006 KB_{68}	—	May 20, 2006	Kitt Peak	Spacewatch	·	1.9 km	MPC · JPL
526439	2006 KO_{74}	—	May 9, 2006	Mount Lemmon	Mount Lemmon Survey	·	1.6 km	MPC · JPL
526440	2006 KZ_{74}	—	May 23, 2006	Kitt Peak	Spacewatch	GAL	1.3 km	MPC · JPL
526441	2006 KE_{88}	—	May 6, 2006	Mount Lemmon	Mount Lemmon Survey	·	1.0 km	MPC · JPL
526442	2006 KU_{91}	—	April 30, 2006	Kitt Peak	Spacewatch	·	1.6 km	MPC · JPL
526443	2006 KH_{111}	—	January 17, 2005	Kitt Peak	Spacewatch	HOF	3.0 km	MPC · JPL
526444	2006 KC_{122}	—	May 4, 2006	Siding Spring	SSS	·	1.7 km	MPC · JPL
526445	2006 KH_{123}	—	May 25, 2006	Kitt Peak	Spacewatch	·	4.0 km	MPC · JPL
526446	2006 KE_{146}	—	May 25, 2006	Mount Lemmon	Mount Lemmon Survey	·	2.2 km	MPC · JPL
526447	2006 MM_{10}	—	June 18, 2006	Kitt Peak	Spacewatch	EOS	4.8 km	MPC · JPL
526448	2006 OM_{6}	—	July 21, 2006	Mount Lemmon	Mount Lemmon Survey	·	1.6 km	MPC · JPL
526449	2006 OH_{15}	—	July 31, 2006	Siding Spring	SSS	AMO	590 m	MPC · JPL
526450	2006 OY_{21}	—	July 21, 2006	Mount Lemmon	Mount Lemmon Survey	·	1.6 km	MPC · JPL
526451	2006 OK_{38}	—	July 18, 2006	Mount Lemmon	Mount Lemmon Survey	·	2.3 km	MPC · JPL
526452	2006 PE_{14}	—	August 14, 2006	Siding Spring	SSS	PHO	2.3 km	MPC · JPL
526453	2006 PO_{19}	—	August 13, 2006	Palomar	NEAT	·	1.2 km	MPC · JPL
526454	2006 PH_{22}	—	June 19, 2006	Mount Lemmon	Mount Lemmon Survey	·	1.2 km	MPC · JPL
526455	2006 QJ_{5}	—	August 19, 2006	Kitt Peak	Spacewatch	·	2.7 km	MPC · JPL
526456	2006 QO_{37}	—	January 19, 2004	Kitt Peak	Spacewatch	·	1.3 km	MPC · JPL
526457	2006 QY_{39}	—	August 24, 2006	San Marcello	San Marcello	·	1.3 km	MPC · JPL
526458	2006 QR_{49}	—	August 22, 2006	Palomar	NEAT	·	1.7 km	MPC · JPL
526459	2006 QV_{84}	—	August 27, 2006	Kitt Peak	Spacewatch	·	2.0 km	MPC · JPL
526460 Ceciliakoocen	2006 QY_{89}	Ceciliakoocen	August 28, 2006	Lulin	H.-C. Lin, Q. Ye	T_{j} (2.99)	2.8 km	MPC · JPL
526461	2006 QR_{95}	—	August 16, 2006	Palomar	NEAT	·	3.3 km	MPC · JPL
526462	2006 QG_{121}	—	August 29, 2006	Catalina	CSS	·	2.8 km	MPC · JPL
526463	2006 QU_{121}	—	August 29, 2006	Kitt Peak	Spacewatch	·	1.1 km	MPC · JPL
526464	2006 QX_{129}	—	August 19, 2006	Palomar	NEAT	·	1.7 km	MPC · JPL
526465	2006 QC_{135}	—	August 18, 2006	Kitt Peak	Spacewatch	(2076)	730 m	MPC · JPL
526466	2006 QW_{149}	—	August 19, 2006	Kitt Peak	Spacewatch	·	2.4 km	MPC · JPL
526467	2006 QJ_{151}	—	August 19, 2006	Kitt Peak	Spacewatch	·	1.9 km	MPC · JPL
526468	2006 QP_{154}	—	August 21, 2006	Socorro	LINEAR	·	1.2 km	MPC · JPL
526469	2006 QQ_{154}	—	August 18, 2006	Palomar	NEAT	·	3.2 km	MPC · JPL
526470	2006 QX_{168}	—	August 30, 2006	Anderson Mesa	LONEOS	THB	3.4 km	MPC · JPL
526471	2006 QU_{185}	—	August 28, 2006	Kitt Peak	Spacewatch	·	1.4 km	MPC · JPL
526472	2006 QB_{188}	—	August 28, 2006	Kitt Peak	Spacewatch	·	2.1 km	MPC · JPL
526473	2006 QE_{188}	—	August 28, 2006	Kitt Peak	Spacewatch	·	1.7 km	MPC · JPL
526474	2006 QH_{188}	—	August 27, 2006	Kitt Peak	Spacewatch	·	810 m	MPC · JPL
526475	2006 QJ_{188}	—	August 27, 2006	Kitt Peak	Spacewatch	·	600 m	MPC · JPL
526476	2006 QL_{188}	—	August 19, 2006	Kitt Peak	Spacewatch	KOR	1.2 km	MPC · JPL
526477	2006 QO_{188}	—	August 28, 2006	Catalina	CSS	·	2.8 km	MPC · JPL
526478	2006 RM_{2}	—	September 11, 2006	Bergisch Gladbach	W. Bickel	·	540 m	MPC · JPL
526479	2006 RL_{13}	—	September 14, 2006	Kitt Peak	Spacewatch	EOS	2.3 km	MPC · JPL
526480	2006 RB_{14}	—	May 25, 2006	Mount Lemmon	Mount Lemmon Survey	·	2.4 km	MPC · JPL
526481	2006 RF_{14}	—	August 30, 2006	Anderson Mesa	LONEOS	T_{j} (2.98)	2.8 km	MPC · JPL
526482	2006 RE_{18}	—	September 14, 2006	Kitt Peak	Spacewatch	T_{j} (2.96) · 3:2	6.2 km	MPC · JPL
526483	2006 RB_{22}	—	August 29, 2006	Catalina	CSS	PHO	840 m	MPC · JPL
526484	2006 RG_{30}	—	May 25, 2006	Mount Lemmon	Mount Lemmon Survey	·	2.5 km	MPC · JPL
526485	2006 RH_{42}	—	September 14, 2006	Kitt Peak	Spacewatch	·	790 m	MPC · JPL
526486	2006 RU_{72}	—	September 15, 2006	Kitt Peak	Spacewatch	·	1.4 km	MPC · JPL
526487	2006 RL_{84}	—	September 15, 2006	Kitt Peak	Spacewatch	·	2.3 km	MPC · JPL
526488	2006 RN_{91}	—	September 15, 2006	Kitt Peak	Spacewatch	·	1.6 km	MPC · JPL
526489	2006 RC_{92}	—	September 15, 2006	Kitt Peak	Spacewatch	·	790 m	MPC · JPL
526490	2006 RM_{98}	—	September 14, 2006	Palomar	NEAT	·	3.7 km	MPC · JPL
526491	2006 RW_{101}	—	September 14, 2006	Catalina	CSS	T_{j} (2.96)	3.5 km	MPC · JPL
526492 Theaket	2006 RQ_{109}	Theaket	September 14, 2006	Mauna Kea	Masiero, J.	·	600 m	MPC · JPL
526493	2006 RK_{121}	—	September 15, 2006	Kitt Peak	Spacewatch	·	780 m	MPC · JPL
526494	2006 RC_{123}	—	September 14, 2006	Kitt Peak	Spacewatch	·	2.0 km	MPC · JPL
526495	2006 SL_{2}	—	September 16, 2006	Catalina	CSS	EUN	880 m	MPC · JPL
526496	2006 SA_{3}	—	September 16, 2006	Catalina	CSS	·	4.8 km	MPC · JPL
526497	2006 SU_{25}	—	September 16, 2006	Anderson Mesa	LONEOS	·	1.6 km	MPC · JPL
526498	2006 SU_{26}	—	September 16, 2006	Anderson Mesa	LONEOS	·	1.8 km	MPC · JPL
526499	2006 SJ_{30}	—	August 29, 2006	Kitt Peak	Spacewatch	·	890 m	MPC · JPL
526500	2006 SO_{45}	—	September 18, 2006	Catalina	CSS	EOS	2.1 km	MPC · JPL

== 526501–526600 ==
back to top

Designation			Discovery			Properties		Ref
Permanent	Provisional	Named after	Date	Site	Discoverer(s)	Category	Diam.	Ref
526501	2006 SG_{50}	—	August 21, 2006	Kitt Peak	Spacewatch	·	650 m	MPC · JPL
526502	2006 SL_{58}	—	September 19, 2006	Kitt Peak	Spacewatch	·	1.2 km	MPC · JPL
526503	2006 ST_{58}	—	September 20, 2006	Kitt Peak	Spacewatch	·	2.3 km	MPC · JPL
526504	2006 SK_{67}	—	September 19, 2006	Kitt Peak	Spacewatch	·	2.5 km	MPC · JPL
526505	2006 SF_{68}	—	September 19, 2006	Kitt Peak	Spacewatch	PHO	2.2 km	MPC · JPL
526506	2006 SG_{72}	—	September 19, 2006	Kitt Peak	Spacewatch	·	1.9 km	MPC · JPL
526507	2006 SS_{90}	—	September 18, 2006	Kitt Peak	Spacewatch	·	1.6 km	MPC · JPL
526508	2006 SN_{98}	—	September 18, 2006	Kitt Peak	Spacewatch	·	570 m	MPC · JPL
526509	2006 SP_{100}	—	September 19, 2006	Kitt Peak	Spacewatch	·	2.6 km	MPC · JPL
526510	2006 SG_{102}	—	September 19, 2006	Kitt Peak	Spacewatch	·	830 m	MPC · JPL
526511	2006 SD_{106}	—	September 19, 2006	Kitt Peak	Spacewatch	PHO	910 m	MPC · JPL
526512	2006 SV_{109}	—	August 28, 2006	Kitt Peak	Spacewatch	·	990 m	MPC · JPL
526513	2006 SS_{124}	—	September 20, 2006	Anderson Mesa	LONEOS	EOS	1.9 km	MPC · JPL
526514	2006 SG_{127}	—	September 24, 2006	Anderson Mesa	LONEOS	T_{j} (2.99)	3.9 km	MPC · JPL
526515	2006 SM_{129}	—	September 18, 2006	Anderson Mesa	LONEOS	(159)	2.8 km	MPC · JPL
526516	2006 ST_{139}	—	September 14, 2006	Catalina	CSS	T_{j} (2.99) · EUP	2.5 km	MPC · JPL
526517	2006 SY_{139}	—	September 14, 2006	Catalina	CSS	·	2.7 km	MPC · JPL
526518	2006 SZ_{139}	—	September 22, 2006	Catalina	CSS	·	830 m	MPC · JPL
526519	2006 SU_{142}	—	September 19, 2006	Kitt Peak	Spacewatch	LIX	2.6 km	MPC · JPL
526520	2006 SV_{143}	—	September 19, 2006	Kitt Peak	Spacewatch	·	2.1 km	MPC · JPL
526521	2006 SO_{150}	—	September 19, 2006	Kitt Peak	Spacewatch	·	590 m	MPC · JPL
526522	2006 SO_{152}	—	September 19, 2006	Kitt Peak	Spacewatch	·	1.5 km	MPC · JPL
526523	2006 SJ_{158}	—	September 23, 2006	Kitt Peak	Spacewatch	VER	2.6 km	MPC · JPL
526524	2006 SB_{159}	—	September 23, 2006	Kitt Peak	Spacewatch	DOR	1.8 km	MPC · JPL
526525	2006 SL_{162}	—	September 18, 2006	Kitt Peak	Spacewatch	(5)	940 m	MPC · JPL
526526	2006 SX_{166}	—	September 25, 2006	Kitt Peak	Spacewatch	·	1.0 km	MPC · JPL
526527	2006 SM_{175}	—	September 25, 2006	Mount Lemmon	Mount Lemmon Survey	·	670 m	MPC · JPL
526528	2006 SD_{182}	—	September 25, 2006	Kitt Peak	Spacewatch	·	500 m	MPC · JPL
526529	2006 SO_{184}	—	September 25, 2006	Kitt Peak	Spacewatch	EMA	2.2 km	MPC · JPL
526530	2006 ST_{186}	—	September 25, 2006	Mount Lemmon	Mount Lemmon Survey	·	2.6 km	MPC · JPL
526531	2006 SX_{194}	—	September 19, 2006	Kitt Peak	Spacewatch	·	2.5 km	MPC · JPL
526532	2006 SB_{202}	—	February 27, 2014	Kitt Peak	Spacewatch	·	2.0 km	MPC · JPL
526533	2006 SU_{213}	—	September 27, 2006	Catalina	CSS	·	730 m	MPC · JPL
526534	2006 SB_{224}	—	September 25, 2006	Mount Lemmon	Mount Lemmon Survey	CYB	3.1 km	MPC · JPL
526535	2006 SF_{239}	—	September 18, 2006	Kitt Peak	Spacewatch	NYS	910 m	MPC · JPL
526536	2006 SR_{246}	—	September 26, 2006	Mount Lemmon	Mount Lemmon Survey	·	1.8 km	MPC · JPL
526537	2006 SK_{248}	—	September 26, 2006	Mount Lemmon	Mount Lemmon Survey	·	1.0 km	MPC · JPL
526538	2006 SK_{254}	—	September 26, 2006	Mount Lemmon	Mount Lemmon Survey	·	1.4 km	MPC · JPL
526539	2006 SW_{257}	—	September 26, 2006	Kitt Peak	Spacewatch	·	1.1 km	MPC · JPL
526540	2006 SJ_{261}	—	September 26, 2006	Kitt Peak	Spacewatch	·	790 m	MPC · JPL
526541	2006 SO_{263}	—	September 26, 2006	Kitt Peak	Spacewatch	·	850 m	MPC · JPL
526542	2006 SX_{263}	—	September 26, 2006	Kitt Peak	Spacewatch	·	2.7 km	MPC · JPL
526543	2006 SH_{271}	—	September 27, 2006	Mount Lemmon	Mount Lemmon Survey	THM	1.4 km	MPC · JPL
526544	2006 SQ_{281}	—	July 21, 2006	Mount Lemmon	Mount Lemmon Survey	·	2.5 km	MPC · JPL
526545	2006 SY_{296}	—	September 17, 2006	Catalina	CSS	H	420 m	MPC · JPL
526546	2006 SR_{297}	—	September 25, 2006	Mount Lemmon	Mount Lemmon Survey	·	820 m	MPC · JPL
526547	2006 SY_{297}	—	September 14, 2006	Kitt Peak	Spacewatch	PHO	930 m	MPC · JPL
526548	2006 SM_{298}	—	September 25, 2006	Mount Lemmon	Mount Lemmon Survey	MAS	670 m	MPC · JPL
526549	2006 SE_{308}	—	September 17, 2006	Kitt Peak	Spacewatch	·	610 m	MPC · JPL
526550	2006 SF_{313}	—	September 27, 2006	Kitt Peak	Spacewatch	·	2.1 km	MPC · JPL
526551	2006 SQ_{313}	—	September 27, 2006	Kitt Peak	Spacewatch	·	2.3 km	MPC · JPL
526552	2006 SK_{326}	—	September 19, 2006	Kitt Peak	Spacewatch	·	1.7 km	MPC · JPL
526553	2006 SR_{329}	—	September 19, 2006	Kitt Peak	Spacewatch	·	2.7 km	MPC · JPL
526554	2006 SL_{330}	—	September 28, 2006	Kitt Peak	Spacewatch	·	3.0 km	MPC · JPL
526555	2006 SD_{333}	—	September 18, 2006	Kitt Peak	Spacewatch	HYG	2.4 km	MPC · JPL
526556	2006 SV_{346}	—	September 28, 2006	Mount Lemmon	Mount Lemmon Survey	(5)	1.0 km	MPC · JPL
526557	2006 SG_{347}	—	September 28, 2006	Kitt Peak	Spacewatch	·	2.0 km	MPC · JPL
526558	2006 SS_{347}	—	September 18, 2006	Kitt Peak	Spacewatch	·	560 m	MPC · JPL
526559	2006 SW_{349}	—	September 16, 2006	Catalina	CSS	·	2.6 km	MPC · JPL
526560	2006 SP_{364}	—	September 28, 2006	Mount Lemmon	Mount Lemmon Survey	·	960 m	MPC · JPL
526561	2006 SS_{376}	—	September 17, 2006	Apache Point	A. C. Becker	·	2.3 km	MPC · JPL
526562	2006 SE_{382}	—	September 28, 2006	Apache Point	A. C. Becker	·	1.2 km	MPC · JPL
526563	2006 SY_{398}	—	September 17, 2006	Kitt Peak	Spacewatch	·	2.4 km	MPC · JPL
526564	2006 SZ_{398}	—	September 17, 2006	Catalina	CSS	·	3.3 km	MPC · JPL
526565	2006 SF_{400}	—	September 19, 2006	Kitt Peak	Spacewatch	·	470 m	MPC · JPL
526566	2006 SG_{404}	—	September 30, 2006	Mount Lemmon	Mount Lemmon Survey	·	800 m	MPC · JPL
526567	2006 SZ_{404}	—	September 28, 2006	Mount Lemmon	Mount Lemmon Survey	(5)	870 m	MPC · JPL
526568	2006 SN_{405}	—	September 20, 2006	Kitt Peak	Spacewatch	URS	2.8 km	MPC · JPL
526569	2006 SS_{415}	—	September 30, 2006	Mount Lemmon	Mount Lemmon Survey	·	1.0 km	MPC · JPL
526570	2006 SA_{416}	—	September 16, 2006	Kitt Peak	Spacewatch	·	3.2 km	MPC · JPL
526571	2006 SG_{416}	—	September 19, 2006	Kitt Peak	Spacewatch	NYS	840 m	MPC · JPL
526572	2006 SC_{422}	—	September 17, 2006	Kitt Peak	Spacewatch	·	1.2 km	MPC · JPL
526573	2006 SF_{422}	—	September 30, 2006	Mount Lemmon	Mount Lemmon Survey	·	2.0 km	MPC · JPL
526574	2006 SM_{422}	—	September 17, 2006	Catalina	CSS	·	3.3 km	MPC · JPL
526575	2006 SP_{422}	—	August 21, 2006	Kitt Peak	Spacewatch	·	2.1 km	MPC · JPL
526576	2006 SS_{422}	—	October 15, 2001	Kitt Peak	Spacewatch	·	2.2 km	MPC · JPL
526577	2006 SW_{422}	—	September 17, 2006	Catalina	CSS	·	5.6 km	MPC · JPL
526578	2006 SB_{423}	—	September 25, 2006	Mount Lemmon	Mount Lemmon Survey	·	800 m	MPC · JPL
526579	2006 SG_{423}	—	September 26, 2006	Mount Lemmon	Mount Lemmon Survey	·	1.1 km	MPC · JPL
526580	2006 SK_{423}	—	September 26, 2006	Mount Lemmon	Mount Lemmon Survey	·	1.0 km	MPC · JPL
526581	2006 SV_{423}	—	September 28, 2006	Mount Lemmon	Mount Lemmon Survey	·	1.7 km	MPC · JPL
526582	2006 SB_{424}	—	September 28, 2006	Mount Lemmon	Mount Lemmon Survey	·	700 m	MPC · JPL
526583	2006 SC_{424}	—	September 28, 2006	Mount Lemmon	Mount Lemmon Survey	·	1.2 km	MPC · JPL
526584	2006 SJ_{424}	—	September 20, 1995	Kitt Peak	Spacewatch	·	2.2 km	MPC · JPL
526585	2006 SL_{424}	—	September 30, 2006	Mount Lemmon	Mount Lemmon Survey	·	530 m	MPC · JPL
526586	2006 SU_{424}	—	September 24, 2006	Anderson Mesa	LONEOS	·	2.7 km	MPC · JPL
526587	2006 TB	—	October 1, 2006	Siding Spring	SSS	AMO · PHA	350 m	MPC · JPL
526588	2006 TQ_{3}	—	October 2, 2006	Mount Lemmon	Mount Lemmon Survey	EOS	1.7 km	MPC · JPL
526589	2006 TB_{4}	—	October 2, 2006	Mount Lemmon	Mount Lemmon Survey	NYS	920 m	MPC · JPL
526590	2006 TF_{9}	—	October 11, 2006	Kitt Peak	Spacewatch	·	940 m	MPC · JPL
526591	2006 TL_{13}	—	October 10, 2006	Palomar	NEAT	·	1.4 km	MPC · JPL
526592	2006 TY_{14}	—	September 26, 2006	Kitt Peak	Spacewatch	·	2.7 km	MPC · JPL
526593	2006 TE_{15}	—	October 11, 2006	Kitt Peak	Spacewatch	·	750 m	MPC · JPL
526594	2006 TR_{17}	—	October 2, 2006	Mount Lemmon	Mount Lemmon Survey	·	930 m	MPC · JPL
526595	2006 TK_{24}	—	October 12, 2006	Kitt Peak	Spacewatch	·	1.9 km	MPC · JPL
526596	2006 TX_{27}	—	October 4, 2006	Mount Lemmon	Mount Lemmon Survey	·	790 m	MPC · JPL
526597	2006 TG_{34}	—	October 12, 2006	Kitt Peak	Spacewatch	T_{j} (2.99) · EUP	3.2 km	MPC · JPL
526598	2006 TQ_{34}	—	September 30, 2006	Mount Lemmon	Mount Lemmon Survey	·	650 m	MPC · JPL
526599	2006 TT_{35}	—	October 12, 2006	Kitt Peak	Spacewatch	·	780 m	MPC · JPL
526600	2006 TN_{44}	—	September 26, 2006	Mount Lemmon	Mount Lemmon Survey	·	3.8 km	MPC · JPL

== 526601–526700 ==
back to top

Designation			Discovery			Properties		Ref
Permanent	Provisional	Named after	Date	Site	Discoverer(s)	Category	Diam.	Ref
526601	2006 TD_{47}	—	October 12, 2006	Kitt Peak	Spacewatch	·	780 m	MPC · JPL
526602	2006 TC_{53}	—	October 12, 2006	Kitt Peak	Spacewatch	·	1.2 km	MPC · JPL
526603	2006 TU_{79}	—	October 13, 2006	Kitt Peak	Spacewatch	·	810 m	MPC · JPL
526604	2006 TT_{82}	—	October 13, 2006	Kitt Peak	Spacewatch	·	2.4 km	MPC · JPL
526605	2006 TD_{83}	—	October 13, 2006	Kitt Peak	Spacewatch	critical	1.0 km	MPC · JPL
526606	2006 TR_{84}	—	October 2, 2006	Mount Lemmon	Mount Lemmon Survey	EOS	1.6 km	MPC · JPL
526607	2006 TM_{85}	—	October 13, 2006	Kitt Peak	Spacewatch	·	1.1 km	MPC · JPL
526608	2006 TS_{87}	—	October 2, 2006	Mount Lemmon	Mount Lemmon Survey	·	2.4 km	MPC · JPL
526609	2006 TC_{92}	—	October 13, 2006	Kitt Peak	Spacewatch	·	790 m	MPC · JPL
526610	2006 TD_{96}	—	September 28, 2006	Catalina	CSS	·	1.3 km	MPC · JPL
526611	2006 TB_{98}	—	September 18, 2006	Kitt Peak	Spacewatch	·	1.9 km	MPC · JPL
526612	2006 TR_{98}	—	October 15, 2006	Kitt Peak	Spacewatch	·	780 m	MPC · JPL
526613	2006 TR_{99}	—	September 18, 2006	Kitt Peak	Spacewatch	·	1.7 km	MPC · JPL
526614	2006 TF_{100}	—	October 2, 2006	Mount Lemmon	Mount Lemmon Survey	·	710 m	MPC · JPL
526615	2006 TJ_{101}	—	September 28, 2006	Mount Lemmon	Mount Lemmon Survey	·	2.6 km	MPC · JPL
526616	2006 TP_{101}	—	October 15, 2006	Kitt Peak	Spacewatch	·	970 m	MPC · JPL
526617	2006 TU_{102}	—	October 2, 2006	Mount Lemmon	Mount Lemmon Survey	T_{j} (2.92)	4.2 km	MPC · JPL
526618	2006 TS_{104}	—	September 30, 2006	Mount Lemmon	Mount Lemmon Survey	·	810 m	MPC · JPL
526619	2006 TM_{105}	—	October 15, 2006	Kitt Peak	Spacewatch	·	1.8 km	MPC · JPL
526620	2006 TD_{122}	—	October 13, 2006	Kitt Peak	Spacewatch	·	1.7 km	MPC · JPL
526621	2006 TT_{127}	—	October 11, 2006	Kitt Peak	Spacewatch	·	750 m	MPC · JPL
526622	2006 TW_{128}	—	October 2, 2006	Mount Lemmon	Mount Lemmon Survey	·	2.2 km	MPC · JPL
526623	2006 TB_{132}	—	October 2, 2006	Catalina	CSS	·	2.6 km	MPC · JPL
526624	2006 TH_{132}	—	October 2, 2006	Mount Lemmon	Mount Lemmon Survey	·	2.1 km	MPC · JPL
526625	2006 TT_{132}	—	December 28, 2003	Kitt Peak	Spacewatch	·	850 m	MPC · JPL
526626	2006 TJ_{133}	—	October 4, 2006	Mount Lemmon	Mount Lemmon Survey	·	3.3 km	MPC · JPL
526627	2006 TK_{133}	—	October 4, 2006	Mount Lemmon	Mount Lemmon Survey	·	2.5 km	MPC · JPL
526628	2006 TP_{133}	—	October 4, 2006	Mount Lemmon	Mount Lemmon Survey	·	1.2 km	MPC · JPL
526629	2006 UF_{11}	—	October 17, 2006	Mount Lemmon	Mount Lemmon Survey	·	780 m	MPC · JPL
526630	2006 UK_{12}	—	September 30, 2006	Mount Lemmon	Mount Lemmon Survey	·	710 m	MPC · JPL
526631	2006 UW_{17}	—	October 16, 2006	Kitt Peak	Spacewatch	NYS	980 m	MPC · JPL
526632	2006 UE_{19}	—	September 25, 2006	Kitt Peak	Spacewatch	·	1.7 km	MPC · JPL
526633	2006 UG_{36}	—	September 30, 2006	Mount Lemmon	Mount Lemmon Survey	·	1.5 km	MPC · JPL
526634	2006 UV_{36}	—	September 27, 2006	Mount Lemmon	Mount Lemmon Survey	EOS	1.8 km	MPC · JPL
526635	2006 UA_{44}	—	October 16, 2006	Kitt Peak	Spacewatch	·	860 m	MPC · JPL
526636	2006 UA_{49}	—	August 21, 2006	Kitt Peak	Spacewatch	EOS	2.1 km	MPC · JPL
526637	2006 UA_{50}	—	September 25, 2006	Kitt Peak	Spacewatch	·	740 m	MPC · JPL
526638	2006 US_{50}	—	October 17, 2006	Kitt Peak	Spacewatch	·	1.7 km	MPC · JPL
526639	2006 UN_{51}	—	September 26, 2006	Mount Lemmon	Mount Lemmon Survey	·	670 m	MPC · JPL
526640	2006 UF_{55}	—	October 4, 2006	Mount Lemmon	Mount Lemmon Survey	·	1 km	MPC · JPL
526641	2006 UN_{57}	—	September 30, 2006	Mount Lemmon	Mount Lemmon Survey	EOS	1.6 km	MPC · JPL
526642	2006 UK_{66}	—	October 16, 2006	Kitt Peak	Spacewatch	·	880 m	MPC · JPL
526643	2006 UF_{72}	—	October 17, 2006	Kitt Peak	Spacewatch	·	670 m	MPC · JPL
526644	2006 UT_{72}	—	September 26, 2006	Kitt Peak	Spacewatch	·	1.6 km	MPC · JPL
526645	2006 UP_{74}	—	October 17, 2006	Kitt Peak	Spacewatch	·	860 m	MPC · JPL
526646	2006 UQ_{81}	—	October 17, 2006	Mount Lemmon	Mount Lemmon Survey	·	910 m	MPC · JPL
526647	2006 UB_{86}	—	October 2, 2006	Mount Lemmon	Mount Lemmon Survey	T_{j} (2.99) · CYB	3.7 km	MPC · JPL
526648	2006 UW_{89}	—	October 17, 2006	Kitt Peak	Spacewatch	T_{j} (2.97) · 3:2	5.6 km	MPC · JPL
526649	2006 UZ_{95}	—	October 18, 2006	Kitt Peak	Spacewatch	·	2.5 km	MPC · JPL
526650	2006 UC_{97}	—	September 30, 2006	Mount Lemmon	Mount Lemmon Survey	·	730 m	MPC · JPL
526651	2006 UN_{100}	—	October 18, 2006	Kitt Peak	Spacewatch	·	1.2 km	MPC · JPL
526652	2006 UR_{107}	—	September 30, 2006	Mount Lemmon	Mount Lemmon Survey	NYS	1.1 km	MPC · JPL
526653	2006 UH_{110}	—	August 21, 2006	Kitt Peak	Spacewatch	·	3.0 km	MPC · JPL
526654	2006 UM_{110}	—	October 19, 2006	Kitt Peak	Spacewatch	·	1.6 km	MPC · JPL
526655	2006 UK_{118}	—	September 18, 2006	Kitt Peak	Spacewatch	·	2.6 km	MPC · JPL
526656	2006 UN_{121}	—	October 19, 2006	Kitt Peak	Spacewatch	·	750 m	MPC · JPL
526657	2006 UN_{130}	—	October 19, 2006	Kitt Peak	Spacewatch	·	910 m	MPC · JPL
526658	2006 UJ_{131}	—	September 27, 2006	Mount Lemmon	Mount Lemmon Survey	·	1.9 km	MPC · JPL
526659	2006 UZ_{147}	—	August 27, 2006	Kitt Peak	Spacewatch	·	1.9 km	MPC · JPL
526660	2006 UU_{157}	—	September 27, 2006	Kitt Peak	Spacewatch	·	530 m	MPC · JPL
526661	2006 UD_{168}	—	October 21, 2006	Mount Lemmon	Mount Lemmon Survey	·	860 m	MPC · JPL
526662	2006 UB_{169}	—	October 21, 2006	Mount Lemmon	Mount Lemmon Survey	KOR	1.4 km	MPC · JPL
526663	2006 UJ_{187}	—	September 17, 2006	Catalina	CSS	·	960 m	MPC · JPL
526664	2006 UP_{193}	—	September 26, 2006	Mount Lemmon	Mount Lemmon Survey	·	2.3 km	MPC · JPL
526665	2006 US_{194}	—	September 26, 2006	Mount Lemmon	Mount Lemmon Survey	·	2.3 km	MPC · JPL
526666	2006 UM_{201}	—	October 21, 2006	Kitt Peak	Spacewatch	·	560 m	MPC · JPL
526667	2006 UY_{204}	—	September 28, 2006	Kitt Peak	Spacewatch	TEL	1.2 km	MPC · JPL
526668	2006 UP_{206}	—	September 30, 2006	Mount Lemmon	Mount Lemmon Survey	·	940 m	MPC · JPL
526669	2006 UD_{211}	—	October 23, 2006	Kitt Peak	Spacewatch	·	1 km	MPC · JPL
526670	2006 UL_{217}	—	October 31, 2006	Socorro	LINEAR	APO · PHA	250 m	MPC · JPL
526671	2006 UF_{235}	—	August 28, 2006	Catalina	CSS	EOS	2.1 km	MPC · JPL
526672	2006 UY_{238}	—	October 2, 2006	Mount Lemmon	Mount Lemmon Survey	·	870 m	MPC · JPL
526673	2006 UC_{258}	—	October 28, 2006	Mount Lemmon	Mount Lemmon Survey	·	2.1 km	MPC · JPL
526674	2006 UU_{271}	—	October 19, 2006	Mount Lemmon	Mount Lemmon Survey	·	570 m	MPC · JPL
526675	2006 UE_{280}	—	October 20, 2006	Kitt Peak	Spacewatch	·	2.8 km	MPC · JPL
526676	2006 US_{281}	—	October 2, 2006	Mount Lemmon	Mount Lemmon Survey	·	3.2 km	MPC · JPL
526677	2006 UC_{290}	—	October 2, 2006	Mount Lemmon	Mount Lemmon Survey	HYG	1.9 km	MPC · JPL
526678	2006 UL_{299}	—	August 27, 2006	Kitt Peak	Spacewatch	KOR	1.1 km	MPC · JPL
526679	2006 UT_{299}	—	August 18, 2006	Kitt Peak	Spacewatch	KOR	1.4 km	MPC · JPL
526680	2006 UK_{346}	—	October 21, 2006	Kitt Peak	Spacewatch	·	490 m	MPC · JPL
526681	2006 UX_{346}	—	October 29, 2006	Mount Lemmon	Mount Lemmon Survey	·	2.8 km	MPC · JPL
526682	2006 UW_{362}	—	August 28, 2005	Kitt Peak	Spacewatch	3:2	4.2 km	MPC · JPL
526683	2006 UX_{362}	—	October 21, 2006	Mount Lemmon	Mount Lemmon Survey	·	2.8 km	MPC · JPL
526684	2006 UG_{364}	—	September 19, 2006	Catalina	CSS	·	3.7 km	MPC · JPL
526685	2006 UT_{364}	—	October 22, 2006	Mount Lemmon	Mount Lemmon Survey	·	2.3 km	MPC · JPL
526686	2006 UX_{364}	—	October 22, 2006	Mount Lemmon	Mount Lemmon Survey	·	1.0 km	MPC · JPL
526687	2006 UG_{365}	—	October 23, 2006	Mount Lemmon	Mount Lemmon Survey	·	1.0 km	MPC · JPL
526688	2006 UH_{365}	—	October 23, 2006	Mount Lemmon	Mount Lemmon Survey	·	1.7 km	MPC · JPL
526689	2006 UJ_{365}	—	October 27, 2006	Catalina	CSS	·	2.5 km	MPC · JPL
526690	2006 UN_{365}	—	October 27, 2006	Mount Lemmon	Mount Lemmon Survey	·	600 m	MPC · JPL
526691	2006 UR_{365}	—	October 30, 2006	Catalina	CSS	(1547)	1.5 km	MPC · JPL
526692	2006 VM	—	October 17, 2006	Kitt Peak	Spacewatch	·	880 m	MPC · JPL
526693	2006 VW_{8}	—	September 27, 2006	Mount Lemmon	Mount Lemmon Survey	EOS	1.8 km	MPC · JPL
526694	2006 VG_{16}	—	October 21, 2006	Kitt Peak	Spacewatch	·	1.7 km	MPC · JPL
526695	2006 VO_{18}	—	October 13, 2006	Kitt Peak	Spacewatch	·	980 m	MPC · JPL
526696	2006 VK_{20}	—	November 9, 2006	Kitt Peak	Spacewatch	·	1.7 km	MPC · JPL
526697	2006 VO_{21}	—	October 20, 2006	Kitt Peak	Spacewatch	·	660 m	MPC · JPL
526698	2006 VY_{27}	—	October 20, 2006	Mount Lemmon	Mount Lemmon Survey	·	990 m	MPC · JPL
526699	2006 VA_{28}	—	November 10, 2006	Kitt Peak	Spacewatch	BRG	1.2 km	MPC · JPL
526700	2006 VE_{30}	—	September 28, 2006	Mount Lemmon	Mount Lemmon Survey	CYB	2.2 km	MPC · JPL

== 526701–526800 ==
back to top

Designation			Discovery			Properties		Ref
Permanent	Provisional	Named after	Date	Site	Discoverer(s)	Category	Diam.	Ref
526701	2006 VE_{37}	—	October 28, 2006	Mount Lemmon	Mount Lemmon Survey	·	890 m	MPC · JPL
526702	2006 VG_{46}	—	November 9, 2006	Kitt Peak	Spacewatch	·	870 m	MPC · JPL
526703	2006 VO_{46}	—	October 21, 2006	Kitt Peak	Spacewatch	·	760 m	MPC · JPL
526704	2006 VD_{47}	—	November 9, 2006	Kitt Peak	Spacewatch	·	700 m	MPC · JPL
526705	2006 VX_{60}	—	October 28, 2006	Mount Lemmon	Mount Lemmon Survey	VER	2.1 km	MPC · JPL
526706	2006 VT_{68}	—	November 11, 2006	Kitt Peak	Spacewatch	·	970 m	MPC · JPL
526707	2006 VO_{73}	—	September 28, 2006	Mount Lemmon	Mount Lemmon Survey	·	700 m	MPC · JPL
526708	2006 VJ_{77}	—	November 12, 2006	Mount Lemmon	Mount Lemmon Survey	·	720 m	MPC · JPL
526709	2006 VJ_{80}	—	September 28, 2006	Mount Lemmon	Mount Lemmon Survey	·	1.4 km	MPC · JPL
526710	2006 VN_{118}	—	November 14, 2006	Kitt Peak	Spacewatch	(5651)	3.6 km	MPC · JPL
526711	2006 VT_{127}	—	November 15, 2006	Kitt Peak	Spacewatch	·	1.4 km	MPC · JPL
526712	2006 VM_{138}	—	October 20, 2006	Mount Lemmon	Mount Lemmon Survey	·	1.0 km	MPC · JPL
526713	2006 VV_{145}	—	November 15, 2006	Catalina	CSS	·	3.2 km	MPC · JPL
526714	2006 VW_{169}	—	November 11, 2006	Kitt Peak	Spacewatch	MAS	580 m	MPC · JPL
526715	2006 VT_{172}	—	November 1, 2006	Kitt Peak	Spacewatch	KOR	1.0 km	MPC · JPL
526716	2006 VX_{172}	—	November 1, 2006	Kitt Peak	Spacewatch	·	2.5 km	MPC · JPL
526717	2006 VA_{175}	—	November 1, 2006	Mount Lemmon	Mount Lemmon Survey	EOS	1.7 km	MPC · JPL
526718	2006 VL_{175}	—	November 2, 2006	Mount Lemmon	Mount Lemmon Survey	·	2.8 km	MPC · JPL
526719	2006 VT_{175}	—	November 13, 2006	Catalina	CSS	·	1.2 km	MPC · JPL
526720	2006 VX_{175}	—	November 13, 2006	Catalina	CSS	·	4.4 km	MPC · JPL
526721	2006 VE_{176}	—	November 15, 2006	Catalina	CSS	·	1.0 km	MPC · JPL
526722	2006 WP_{5}	—	November 12, 2006	Mount Lemmon	Mount Lemmon Survey	EOS	1.8 km	MPC · JPL
526723	2006 WK_{7}	—	November 16, 2006	Kitt Peak	Spacewatch	EOS	1.7 km	MPC · JPL
526724	2006 WB_{29}	—	November 19, 2006	Kitt Peak	Spacewatch	·	1.1 km	MPC · JPL
526725	2006 WP_{31}	—	October 23, 2006	Mount Lemmon	Mount Lemmon Survey	·	2.4 km	MPC · JPL
526726	2006 WG_{34}	—	October 23, 2006	Mount Lemmon	Mount Lemmon Survey	·	760 m	MPC · JPL
526727	2006 WW_{40}	—	November 16, 2006	Kitt Peak	Spacewatch	·	760 m	MPC · JPL
526728	2006 WB_{42}	—	November 16, 2006	Mount Lemmon	Mount Lemmon Survey	·	2.2 km	MPC · JPL
526729	2006 WD_{44}	—	November 16, 2006	Mount Lemmon	Mount Lemmon Survey	·	810 m	MPC · JPL
526730	2006 WL_{47}	—	November 16, 2006	Kitt Peak	Spacewatch	·	1.2 km	MPC · JPL
526731	2006 WP_{54}	—	November 16, 2006	Kitt Peak	Spacewatch	·	1.9 km	MPC · JPL
526732	2006 WT_{56}	—	November 11, 2006	Kitt Peak	Spacewatch	·	1.3 km	MPC · JPL
526733	2006 WF_{59}	—	November 17, 2006	Kitt Peak	Spacewatch	·	1 km	MPC · JPL
526734	2006 WO_{76}	—	October 3, 2006	Mount Lemmon	Mount Lemmon Survey	·	920 m	MPC · JPL
526735	2006 WN_{80}	—	November 10, 2006	Kitt Peak	Spacewatch	·	920 m	MPC · JPL
526736	2006 WC_{85}	—	November 18, 2006	Kitt Peak	Spacewatch	·	1 km	MPC · JPL
526737	2006 WT_{87}	—	November 18, 2006	Mount Lemmon	Mount Lemmon Survey	·	3.0 km	MPC · JPL
526738	2006 WC_{99}	—	November 19, 2006	Kitt Peak	Spacewatch	·	760 m	MPC · JPL
526739	2006 WR_{102}	—	November 19, 2006	Kitt Peak	Spacewatch	·	2.1 km	MPC · JPL
526740	2006 WE_{105}	—	November 19, 2006	Kitt Peak	Spacewatch	·	910 m	MPC · JPL
526741	2006 WW_{121}	—	November 21, 2006	Mount Lemmon	Mount Lemmon Survey	·	750 m	MPC · JPL
526742	2006 WR_{127}	—	November 25, 2006	Mount Lemmon	Mount Lemmon Survey	ATE	290 m	MPC · JPL
526743	2006 WH_{139}	—	November 19, 2006	Kitt Peak	Spacewatch	·	1.1 km	MPC · JPL
526744	2006 WU_{139}	—	November 19, 2006	Kitt Peak	Spacewatch	THM	1.6 km	MPC · JPL
526745	2006 WG_{146}	—	November 16, 2006	Kitt Peak	Spacewatch	(5)	870 m	MPC · JPL
526746	2006 WM_{147}	—	November 16, 2006	Kitt Peak	Spacewatch	·	570 m	MPC · JPL
526747	2006 WG_{150}	—	November 11, 2006	Mount Lemmon	Mount Lemmon Survey	·	680 m	MPC · JPL
526748	2006 WE_{154}	—	October 3, 2006	Mount Lemmon	Mount Lemmon Survey	·	650 m	MPC · JPL
526749	2006 WC_{160}	—	November 22, 2006	Mount Lemmon	Mount Lemmon Survey	·	1.0 km	MPC · JPL
526750	2006 WT_{161}	—	November 15, 2006	Kitt Peak	Spacewatch	·	940 m	MPC · JPL
526751	2006 WE_{163}	—	October 19, 2006	Mount Lemmon	Mount Lemmon Survey	·	1.5 km	MPC · JPL
526752	2006 WG_{169}	—	November 11, 2006	Mount Lemmon	Mount Lemmon Survey	·	550 m	MPC · JPL
526753	2006 WX_{173}	—	November 11, 2006	Kitt Peak	Spacewatch	·	870 m	MPC · JPL
526754	2006 WZ_{179}	—	October 31, 2006	Mount Lemmon	Mount Lemmon Survey	CYB	3.2 km	MPC · JPL
526755	2006 WW_{200}	—	November 26, 2006	Kitt Peak	Spacewatch	·	840 m	MPC · JPL
526756	2006 WV_{201}	—	November 18, 2006	Mount Lemmon	Mount Lemmon Survey	(5)	1.0 km	MPC · JPL
526757	2006 WN_{203}	—	November 16, 2006	Kitt Peak	Spacewatch	·	3.0 km	MPC · JPL
526758	2006 WA_{205}	—	November 17, 2006	Kitt Peak	Spacewatch	·	940 m	MPC · JPL
526759	2006 WR_{207}	—	November 16, 2006	Mount Lemmon	Mount Lemmon Survey	·	3.2 km	MPC · JPL
526760	2006 WU_{207}	—	November 21, 2006	Mount Lemmon	Mount Lemmon Survey	·	3.7 km	MPC · JPL
526761	2006 WG_{208}	—	November 23, 2006	Mount Lemmon	Mount Lemmon Survey	(5)	1.1 km	MPC · JPL
526762	2006 WH_{208}	—	November 17, 2006	Mount Lemmon	Mount Lemmon Survey	MAS	820 m	MPC · JPL
526763	2006 WM_{208}	—	November 16, 2006	Mount Lemmon	Mount Lemmon Survey	·	2.6 km	MPC · JPL
526764	2006 WO_{208}	—	November 17, 2006	Mount Lemmon	Mount Lemmon Survey	·	2.3 km	MPC · JPL
526765	2006 WP_{208}	—	November 17, 2006	Catalina	CSS	T_{j} (2.97) · EUP	3.3 km	MPC · JPL
526766	2006 WQ_{208}	—	November 17, 2006	Mount Lemmon	Mount Lemmon Survey	·	2.7 km	MPC · JPL
526767	2006 WS_{208}	—	November 17, 2006	Mount Lemmon	Mount Lemmon Survey	·	2.7 km	MPC · JPL
526768	2006 WU_{208}	—	November 17, 2006	Mount Lemmon	Mount Lemmon Survey	(5)	1.1 km	MPC · JPL
526769	2006 WV_{208}	—	November 18, 2006	Mount Lemmon	Mount Lemmon Survey	·	2.4 km	MPC · JPL
526770	2006 WZ_{208}	—	October 16, 2006	Catalina	CSS	THB	2.4 km	MPC · JPL
526771	2006 WC_{209}	—	November 21, 2006	Mount Lemmon	Mount Lemmon Survey	·	2.2 km	MPC · JPL
526772	2006 WF_{209}	—	February 27, 1992	Kitt Peak	Spacewatch	·	1.4 km	MPC · JPL
526773	2006 XO	—	November 23, 2006	Mount Lemmon	Mount Lemmon Survey	·	1.2 km	MPC · JPL
526774	2006 XT_{3}	—	December 12, 2006	Socorro	LINEAR	·	490 m	MPC · JPL
526775	2006 XQ_{16}	—	December 10, 2006	Kitt Peak	Spacewatch	TIR	2.8 km	MPC · JPL
526776	2006 XA_{27}	—	December 12, 2006	Catalina	CSS	PHO	900 m	MPC · JPL
526777	2006 XM_{40}	—	November 28, 2006	Kitt Peak	Spacewatch	·	990 m	MPC · JPL
526778	2006 XT_{45}	—	November 27, 2006	Kitt Peak	Spacewatch	·	730 m	MPC · JPL
526779	2006 XG_{48}	—	December 13, 2006	Catalina	CSS	·	1.8 km	MPC · JPL
526780	2006 XT_{50}	—	November 27, 2006	Mount Lemmon	Mount Lemmon Survey	(5)	1.2 km	MPC · JPL
526781	2006 XY_{55}	—	November 15, 2006	Mount Lemmon	Mount Lemmon Survey	·	1.1 km	MPC · JPL
526782	2006 XA_{67}	—	December 14, 2006	Palomar	NEAT	·	1.4 km	MPC · JPL
526783	2006 XO_{69}	—	December 15, 2006	Kitt Peak	Spacewatch	·	1.1 km	MPC · JPL
526784	2006 XK_{73}	—	December 15, 2006	Kitt Peak	Spacewatch	(5)	880 m	MPC · JPL
526785	2006 XK_{74}	—	December 1, 2006	Mount Lemmon	Mount Lemmon Survey	NYS	1.1 km	MPC · JPL
526786	2006 XO_{74}	—	December 13, 2006	Mount Lemmon	Mount Lemmon Survey	·	2.9 km	MPC · JPL
526787	2006 XQ_{74}	—	December 15, 2006	Mount Lemmon	Mount Lemmon Survey	·	3.0 km	MPC · JPL
526788	2006 YZ_{1}	—	December 16, 2006	Mount Lemmon	Mount Lemmon Survey	·	1.4 km	MPC · JPL
526789	2006 YC_{4}	—	December 16, 2006	Mount Lemmon	Mount Lemmon Survey	·	1.1 km	MPC · JPL
526790	2006 YA_{9}	—	October 3, 2006	Mount Lemmon	Mount Lemmon Survey	·	1.1 km	MPC · JPL
526791	2006 YF_{12}	—	December 13, 2006	Mount Lemmon	Mount Lemmon Survey	(5)	1.1 km	MPC · JPL
526792	2006 YG_{28}	—	December 13, 2006	Kitt Peak	Spacewatch	(5)	900 m	MPC · JPL
526793	2006 YU_{36}	—	December 21, 2006	Kitt Peak	Spacewatch	·	870 m	MPC · JPL
526794	2006 YG_{48}	—	November 27, 2006	Mount Lemmon	Mount Lemmon Survey	·	1.1 km	MPC · JPL
526795	2006 YN_{52}	—	December 13, 2006	Kitt Peak	Spacewatch	·	2.1 km	MPC · JPL
526796	2006 YF_{57}	—	December 29, 2006	Mount Lemmon	Mount Lemmon Survey	·	3.3 km	MPC · JPL
526797	2007 AO	—	November 27, 2006	Mount Lemmon	Mount Lemmon Survey	(5)	880 m	MPC · JPL
526798	2007 AA_{9}	—	January 13, 2007	Socorro	LINEAR	ATE	110 m	MPC · JPL
526799	2007 AC_{10}	—	October 23, 2006	Mount Lemmon	Mount Lemmon Survey	·	1.0 km	MPC · JPL
526800	2007 AM_{12}	—	December 24, 2006	Kitt Peak	Spacewatch	·	1.3 km	MPC · JPL

== 526801–526900 ==
back to top

Designation			Discovery			Properties		Ref
Permanent	Provisional	Named after	Date	Site	Discoverer(s)	Category	Diam.	Ref
526801	2007 AC_{32}	—	January 10, 2007	Mount Lemmon	Mount Lemmon Survey	·	750 m	MPC · JPL
526802	2007 BC	—	January 16, 2007	Catalina	CSS	·	2.0 km	MPC · JPL
526803	2007 BL_{3}	—	December 23, 2006	Catalina	CSS	·	1.4 km	MPC · JPL
526804	2007 BO_{3}	—	November 27, 2006	Mount Lemmon	Mount Lemmon Survey	(5)	1.1 km	MPC · JPL
526805	2007 BA_{26}	—	December 21, 2006	Mount Lemmon	Mount Lemmon Survey	·	3.3 km	MPC · JPL
526806	2007 BD_{26}	—	December 26, 2006	Kitt Peak	Spacewatch	·	570 m	MPC · JPL
526807	2007 BW_{28}	—	November 27, 2006	Mount Lemmon	Mount Lemmon Survey	·	1.2 km	MPC · JPL
526808	2007 BW_{33}	—	January 24, 2007	Mount Lemmon	Mount Lemmon Survey	THM	1.9 km	MPC · JPL
526809	2007 BW_{34}	—	January 24, 2007	Kitt Peak	Spacewatch	H	370 m	MPC · JPL
526810	2007 BA_{35}	—	December 21, 2006	Kitt Peak	Spacewatch	·	3.2 km	MPC · JPL
526811	2007 BA_{36}	—	January 24, 2007	Mount Lemmon	Mount Lemmon Survey	·	1.0 km	MPC · JPL
526812	2007 BM_{38}	—	December 27, 2006	Mount Lemmon	Mount Lemmon Survey	·	820 m	MPC · JPL
526813	2007 BN_{38}	—	December 21, 2006	Mount Lemmon	Mount Lemmon Survey	EUN	1.1 km	MPC · JPL
526814	2007 BU_{38}	—	November 22, 2006	Mount Lemmon	Mount Lemmon Survey	·	1.1 km	MPC · JPL
526815	2007 BL_{51}	—	January 10, 2007	Kitt Peak	Spacewatch	·	2.1 km	MPC · JPL
526816	2007 BM_{55}	—	December 21, 2006	Mount Lemmon	Mount Lemmon Survey	·	1.5 km	MPC · JPL
526817	2007 BR_{75}	—	January 17, 2007	Palomar	NEAT	·	970 m	MPC · JPL
526818	2007 BF_{103}	—	January 28, 2007	Mount Lemmon	Mount Lemmon Survey	·	3.1 km	MPC · JPL
526819	2007 BH_{103}	—	January 17, 2007	Kitt Peak	Spacewatch	·	1.8 km	MPC · JPL
526820	2007 BQ_{103}	—	January 27, 2007	Mount Lemmon	Mount Lemmon Survey	·	2.5 km	MPC · JPL
526821	2007 BS_{103}	—	January 27, 2007	Mount Lemmon	Mount Lemmon Survey	MAS	690 m	MPC · JPL
526822	2007 CK_{1}	—	January 27, 2007	Kitt Peak	Spacewatch	·	1.3 km	MPC · JPL
526823	2007 CK_{9}	—	January 9, 2007	Kitt Peak	Spacewatch	·	1.3 km	MPC · JPL
526824	2007 CC_{15}	—	February 7, 2007	Mount Lemmon	Mount Lemmon Survey	·	1.4 km	MPC · JPL
526825	2007 CK_{26}	—	February 8, 2007	Palomar	NEAT	APO	560 m	MPC · JPL
526826	2007 CA_{27}	—	February 13, 2007	Catalina	CSS	ATE	200 m	MPC · JPL
526827	2007 CR_{30}	—	January 9, 2007	Kitt Peak	Spacewatch	(5)	1.0 km	MPC · JPL
526828	2007 CO_{32}	—	January 27, 2007	Mount Lemmon	Mount Lemmon Survey	NYS	800 m	MPC · JPL
526829	2007 CX_{32}	—	February 6, 2007	Mount Lemmon	Mount Lemmon Survey	EOS	1.6 km	MPC · JPL
526830	2007 CN_{42}	—	February 7, 2007	Mount Lemmon	Mount Lemmon Survey	T_{j} (2.99) · EUP	3.2 km	MPC · JPL
526831	2007 CD_{57}	—	November 28, 2006	Mount Lemmon	Mount Lemmon Survey	T_{j} (2.96)	3.6 km	MPC · JPL
526832	2007 CY_{78}	—	February 13, 2007	Mount Lemmon	Mount Lemmon Survey	·	2.4 km	MPC · JPL
526833	2007 CJ_{80}	—	February 6, 2007	Mount Lemmon	Mount Lemmon Survey	·	3.3 km	MPC · JPL
526834	2007 CO_{80}	—	February 8, 2007	Mount Lemmon	Mount Lemmon Survey	·	3.4 km	MPC · JPL
526835	2007 CW_{80}	—	February 13, 2007	Mount Lemmon	Mount Lemmon Survey	·	1.3 km	MPC · JPL
526836	2007 DN_{13}	—	February 8, 2007	Kitt Peak	Spacewatch	THB	3.0 km	MPC · JPL
526837	2007 DZ_{19}	—	January 28, 2007	Mount Lemmon	Mount Lemmon Survey	·	620 m	MPC · JPL
526838	2007 DO_{23}	—	January 27, 2007	Mount Lemmon	Mount Lemmon Survey	·	1.5 km	MPC · JPL
526839	2007 DJ_{24}	—	January 27, 2007	Mount Lemmon	Mount Lemmon Survey	EUN	1.1 km	MPC · JPL
526840	2007 DL_{38}	—	February 17, 2007	Kitt Peak	Spacewatch	·	890 m	MPC · JPL
526841	2007 DM_{67}	—	February 21, 2007	Kitt Peak	Spacewatch	·	1.7 km	MPC · JPL
526842	2007 DT_{68}	—	August 29, 2005	Kitt Peak	Spacewatch	·	1.1 km	MPC · JPL
526843	2007 DG_{72}	—	February 21, 2007	Kitt Peak	Spacewatch	MIS	1.9 km	MPC · JPL
526844	2007 DW_{73}	—	February 21, 2007	Kitt Peak	Spacewatch	THM	1.9 km	MPC · JPL
526845	2007 DX_{74}	—	February 21, 2007	Kitt Peak	Spacewatch	(5)	770 m	MPC · JPL
526846	2007 DY_{77}	—	December 21, 2006	Mount Lemmon	Mount Lemmon Survey	·	830 m	MPC · JPL
526847	2007 DM_{79}	—	January 28, 2007	Catalina	CSS	·	2.5 km	MPC · JPL
526848	2007 DR_{80}	—	January 28, 2007	Mount Lemmon	Mount Lemmon Survey	·	2.4 km	MPC · JPL
526849	2007 DR_{84}	—	February 18, 2007	Socorro	LINEAR	·	1.5 km	MPC · JPL
526850	2007 DP_{94}	—	February 23, 2007	Kitt Peak	Spacewatch	(5)	1.0 km	MPC · JPL
526851	2007 DS_{118}	—	February 21, 2007	Kitt Peak	Spacewatch	GEF	1.0 km	MPC · JPL
526852	2007 DC_{119}	—	February 21, 2007	Mount Lemmon	Mount Lemmon Survey	·	2.9 km	MPC · JPL
526853	2007 DK_{119}	—	February 21, 2007	Mount Lemmon	Mount Lemmon Survey	L5	9.8 km	MPC · JPL
526854	2007 DM_{119}	—	February 23, 2007	Mount Lemmon	Mount Lemmon Survey	·	3.0 km	MPC · JPL
526855	2007 DS_{119}	—	February 25, 2007	Mount Lemmon	Mount Lemmon Survey	·	1.2 km	MPC · JPL
526856	2007 DV_{119}	—	January 28, 2007	Kitt Peak	Spacewatch	·	580 m	MPC · JPL
526857	2007 EM_{8}	—	March 9, 2007	Mount Lemmon	Mount Lemmon Survey	THM	2.0 km	MPC · JPL
526858	2007 ED_{16}	—	February 21, 2007	Mount Lemmon	Mount Lemmon Survey	·	780 m	MPC · JPL
526859	2007 EU_{41}	—	March 9, 2007	Mount Lemmon	Mount Lemmon Survey	·	3.3 km	MPC · JPL
526860	2007 EU_{46}	—	March 9, 2007	Mount Lemmon	Mount Lemmon Survey	·	1.9 km	MPC · JPL
526861	2007 EY_{52}	—	February 21, 2007	Kitt Peak	Spacewatch	·	520 m	MPC · JPL
526862	2007 EN_{87}	—	March 13, 2007	Kitt Peak	Spacewatch	·	1.2 km	MPC · JPL
526863	2007 EL_{111}	—	March 11, 2007	Kitt Peak	Spacewatch	·	1.3 km	MPC · JPL
526864	2007 EQ_{129}	—	February 23, 2007	Mount Lemmon	Mount Lemmon Survey	ADE	1.6 km	MPC · JPL
526865	2007 EC_{133}	—	March 9, 2007	Mount Lemmon	Mount Lemmon Survey	JUN	1.0 km	MPC · JPL
526866	2007 EA_{136}	—	February 17, 2007	Kitt Peak	Spacewatch	·	1.2 km	MPC · JPL
526867	2007 EW_{145}	—	February 26, 2007	Mount Lemmon	Mount Lemmon Survey	·	940 m	MPC · JPL
526868	2007 EM_{147}	—	March 12, 2007	Mount Lemmon	Mount Lemmon Survey	·	960 m	MPC · JPL
526869	2007 EH_{176}	—	March 14, 2007	Kitt Peak	Spacewatch	·	1.7 km	MPC · JPL
526870	2007 EG_{202}	—	January 28, 2007	Mount Lemmon	Mount Lemmon Survey	·	1.3 km	MPC · JPL
526871	2007 EC_{215}	—	March 11, 2007	Catalina	CSS	·	1.6 km	MPC · JPL
526872	2007 EH_{222}	—	March 14, 2007	Kitt Peak	Spacewatch	L5	7.1 km	MPC · JPL
526873	2007 EZ_{225}	—	March 13, 2007	Mount Lemmon	Mount Lemmon Survey	·	1.9 km	MPC · JPL
526874	2007 EA_{226}	—	March 14, 2007	Mount Lemmon	Mount Lemmon Survey	·	2.0 km	MPC · JPL
526875	2007 ER_{226}	—	March 9, 2007	Mount Lemmon	Mount Lemmon Survey	·	990 m	MPC · JPL
526876	2007 EV_{226}	—	March 10, 2007	Mount Lemmon	Mount Lemmon Survey	·	1.2 km	MPC · JPL
526877	2007 EC_{227}	—	March 13, 2007	Mount Lemmon	Mount Lemmon Survey	·	780 m	MPC · JPL
526878	2007 FE	—	March 16, 2007	Catalina	CSS	APO · PHA	480 m	MPC · JPL
526879	2007 FG_{14}	—	March 19, 2007	Mount Lemmon	Mount Lemmon Survey	·	2.0 km	MPC · JPL
526880	2007 FR_{14}	—	March 19, 2007	Mount Lemmon	Mount Lemmon Survey	·	900 m	MPC · JPL
526881	2007 FT_{16}	—	March 9, 2007	Mount Lemmon	Mount Lemmon Survey	MRX	1.0 km	MPC · JPL
526882	2007 FP_{20}	—	March 20, 2007	Catalina	CSS	·	3.5 km	MPC · JPL
526883	2007 FV_{20}	—	March 26, 2003	Kitt Peak	Spacewatch	·	710 m	MPC · JPL
526884	2007 FE_{29}	—	March 10, 2007	Mount Lemmon	Mount Lemmon Survey	·	750 m	MPC · JPL
526885	2007 FC_{39}	—	March 28, 2007	Siding Spring	SSS	·	2.0 km	MPC · JPL
526886	2007 FX_{41}	—	March 26, 2007	Mount Lemmon	Mount Lemmon Survey	·	1.5 km	MPC · JPL
526887	2007 FR_{48}	—	March 26, 2007	Mount Lemmon	Mount Lemmon Survey	·	680 m	MPC · JPL
526888	2007 FT_{52}	—	March 20, 2007	Catalina	CSS	H	430 m	MPC · JPL
526889	2007 GH_{6}	—	April 10, 2007	Črni Vrh	Mikuž, H.	T_{j} (2.6) · unusual	8.0 km	MPC · JPL
526890	2007 GN_{28}	—	April 11, 2003	Kitt Peak	Spacewatch	MAR	1.1 km	MPC · JPL
526891	2007 GQ_{38}	—	April 14, 2007	Kitt Peak	Spacewatch	·	990 m	MPC · JPL
526892	2007 GM_{41}	—	April 14, 2007	Mount Lemmon	Mount Lemmon Survey	H	390 m	MPC · JPL
526893	2007 GJ_{52}	—	April 14, 2007	Kitt Peak	Spacewatch	·	490 m	MPC · JPL
526894	2007 GZ_{55}	—	April 15, 2007	Kitt Peak	Spacewatch	DOR	2.4 km	MPC · JPL
526895	2007 GZ_{57}	—	March 15, 2007	Mount Lemmon	Mount Lemmon Survey	EUN	1.4 km	MPC · JPL
526896	2007 GM_{76}	—	March 16, 2007	Mount Lemmon	Mount Lemmon Survey	(194)	1.0 km	MPC · JPL
526897	2007 GA_{78}	—	April 14, 2007	Mount Lemmon	Mount Lemmon Survey	KON	2.3 km	MPC · JPL
526898	2007 HR	—	April 16, 2007	Mount Lemmon	Mount Lemmon Survey	APO	260 m	MPC · JPL
526899	2007 HV_{1}	—	April 16, 2007	Mount Lemmon	Mount Lemmon Survey	·	2.0 km	MPC · JPL
526900	2007 HM_{2}	—	February 26, 2007	Mount Lemmon	Mount Lemmon Survey	L5	8.5 km	MPC · JPL

== 526901–527000 ==
back to top

Designation			Discovery			Properties		Ref
Permanent	Provisional	Named after	Date	Site	Discoverer(s)	Category	Diam.	Ref
526901	2007 HL_{21}	—	April 18, 2007	Kitt Peak	Spacewatch	EUN	890 m	MPC · JPL
526902	2007 HE_{35}	—	April 11, 2007	Kitt Peak	Spacewatch	·	1.4 km	MPC · JPL
526903	2007 HX_{43}	—	April 22, 2007	Mount Lemmon	Mount Lemmon Survey	JUN	980 m	MPC · JPL
526904	2007 HO_{49}	—	April 20, 2007	Kitt Peak	Spacewatch	DOR	2.4 km	MPC · JPL
526905	2007 HN_{61}	—	March 14, 2007	Kitt Peak	Spacewatch	H	400 m	MPC · JPL
526906	2007 HX_{62}	—	March 20, 2007	Kitt Peak	Spacewatch	·	950 m	MPC · JPL
526907	2007 HF_{72}	—	April 22, 2007	Kitt Peak	Spacewatch	H	470 m	MPC · JPL
526908	2007 HG_{74}	—	April 14, 2007	Kitt Peak	Spacewatch	·	960 m	MPC · JPL
526909	2007 HQ_{80}	—	April 25, 2007	Mount Lemmon	Mount Lemmon Survey	LEO	1.5 km	MPC · JPL
526910	2007 HT_{80}	—	April 14, 2007	Mount Lemmon	Mount Lemmon Survey	·	1.5 km	MPC · JPL
526911	2007 HX_{91}	—	March 26, 2007	Kitt Peak	Spacewatch	·	860 m	MPC · JPL
526912	2007 HE_{92}	—	March 15, 2007	Mount Lemmon	Mount Lemmon Survey	·	910 m	MPC · JPL
526913	2007 HT_{99}	—	April 24, 2007	Kitt Peak	Spacewatch	·	1.1 km	MPC · JPL
526914	2007 HJ_{100}	—	April 25, 2007	Mount Lemmon	Mount Lemmon Survey	·	770 m	MPC · JPL
526915	2007 JB_{2}	—	April 24, 2007	Mount Lemmon	Mount Lemmon Survey	·	1.2 km	MPC · JPL
526916	2007 JE_{2}	—	May 7, 2007	Mount Lemmon	Mount Lemmon Survey	·	1.1 km	MPC · JPL
526917	2007 JX_{3}	—	March 16, 2007	Mount Lemmon	Mount Lemmon Survey	·	1.4 km	MPC · JPL
526918	2007 JU_{15}	—	May 10, 2007	Mount Lemmon	Mount Lemmon Survey	·	1.2 km	MPC · JPL
526919	2007 JG_{18}	—	May 8, 2007	Kitt Peak	Spacewatch	·	2.5 km	MPC · JPL
526920	2007 JY_{26}	—	April 19, 2007	Mount Lemmon	Mount Lemmon Survey	(194)	1.1 km	MPC · JPL
526921	2007 JR_{36}	—	March 13, 2007	Kitt Peak	Spacewatch	·	1.5 km	MPC · JPL
526922	2007 JK_{38}	—	April 11, 2007	Mount Lemmon	Mount Lemmon Survey	·	1.6 km	MPC · JPL
526923	2007 JC_{47}	—	April 22, 2007	Siding Spring	SSS	·	1.4 km	MPC · JPL
526924	2007 JG_{47}	—	May 13, 2007	Mount Lemmon	Mount Lemmon Survey	EUN	1.3 km	MPC · JPL
526925	2007 KU_{9}	—	May 25, 2007	Mount Lemmon	Mount Lemmon Survey	GEF	1.1 km	MPC · JPL
526926	2007 KW_{9}	—	May 26, 2007	Mount Lemmon	Mount Lemmon Survey	·	1.8 km	MPC · JPL
526927	2007 LO_{13}	—	March 25, 2007	Mount Lemmon	Mount Lemmon Survey	·	1.2 km	MPC · JPL
526928	2007 LP_{13}	—	March 25, 2007	Mount Lemmon	Mount Lemmon Survey	BRA	1.6 km	MPC · JPL
526929	2007 LF_{15}	—	June 12, 2007	Reedy Creek	J. Broughton	·	2.5 km	MPC · JPL
526930	2007 LB_{17}	—	May 12, 2007	Kitt Peak	Spacewatch	·	910 m	MPC · JPL
526931	2007 LK_{27}	—	June 12, 2007	Kitt Peak	Spacewatch	·	1.2 km	MPC · JPL
526932	2007 LJ_{37}	—	June 14, 2007	Kitt Peak	Spacewatch	·	1.1 km	MPC · JPL
526933	2007 ML_{1}	—	June 16, 2007	Kitt Peak	Spacewatch	·	2.5 km	MPC · JPL
526934	2007 MA_{11}	—	June 21, 2007	Mount Lemmon	Mount Lemmon Survey	·	2.0 km	MPC · JPL
526935	2007 MW_{15}	—	June 20, 2007	Kitt Peak	Spacewatch	·	2.3 km	MPC · JPL
526936	2007 MZ_{23}	—	June 24, 2007	Catalina	CSS	·	1.9 km	MPC · JPL
526937	2007 OR	—	July 17, 2007	Eskridge	G. Hug	·	1.1 km	MPC · JPL
526938	2007 OJ_{11}	—	July 19, 2007	Mount Lemmon	Mount Lemmon Survey	AST	1.7 km	MPC · JPL
526939	2007 OM_{11}	—	July 18, 2007	Mount Lemmon	Mount Lemmon Survey	·	1.2 km	MPC · JPL
526940	2007 PR	—	August 5, 2007	Reedy Creek	J. Broughton	T_{j} (2.98)	2.2 km	MPC · JPL
526941	2007 PG_{17}	—	August 9, 2007	Dauban	Chante-Perdrix	·	1.0 km	MPC · JPL
526942	2007 PE_{21}	—	August 9, 2007	Socorro	LINEAR	H	550 m	MPC · JPL
526943	2007 PV_{31}	—	August 8, 2007	Socorro	LINEAR	·	730 m	MPC · JPL
526944	2007 PU_{40}	—	August 9, 2007	Socorro	LINEAR	·	890 m	MPC · JPL
526945	2007 PV_{43}	—	August 12, 2007	Socorro	LINEAR	·	1.3 km	MPC · JPL
526946	2007 PO_{46}	—	August 10, 2007	Kitt Peak	Spacewatch	·	750 m	MPC · JPL
526947	2007 PH_{49}	—	July 17, 2007	Catalina	CSS	·	1.0 km	MPC · JPL
526948	2007 PW_{50}	—	August 10, 2007	Kitt Peak	Spacewatch	·	2.5 km	MPC · JPL
526949	2007 PZ_{50}	—	August 10, 2007	Kitt Peak	Spacewatch	·	1.9 km	MPC · JPL
526950	2007 PE_{51}	—	March 24, 1995	Kitt Peak	Spacewatch	PHO	970 m	MPC · JPL
526951	2007 QG_{8}	—	August 22, 2007	Socorro	LINEAR	·	1.4 km	MPC · JPL
526952	2007 QF_{11}	—	August 23, 2007	Kitt Peak	Spacewatch	·	1.3 km	MPC · JPL
526953	2007 QC_{18}	—	August 23, 2007	Kitt Peak	Spacewatch	·	1.4 km	MPC · JPL
526954	2007 RK_{3}	—	September 3, 2007	Catalina	CSS	·	2.4 km	MPC · JPL
526955	2007 RM_{7}	—	August 23, 2007	Kitt Peak	Spacewatch	·	2.4 km	MPC · JPL
526956	2007 RM_{13}	—	September 3, 2007	Catalina	CSS	·	1.1 km	MPC · JPL
526957	2007 RK_{15}	—	September 12, 2007	Catalina	CSS	PHO	1.0 km	MPC · JPL
526958	2007 RA_{19}	—	September 11, 2007	Mount Lemmon	Mount Lemmon Survey	·	1.0 km	MPC · JPL
526959	2007 RX_{26}	—	August 22, 2007	Anderson Mesa	LONEOS	NYS	910 m	MPC · JPL
526960	2007 RO_{27}	—	August 10, 2007	Kitt Peak	Spacewatch	·	770 m	MPC · JPL
526961	2007 RT_{28}	—	September 4, 2007	Mount Lemmon	Mount Lemmon Survey	THM	2.0 km	MPC · JPL
526962	2007 RF_{29}	—	August 17, 2007	XuYi	PMO NEO Survey Program	TIR	2.9 km	MPC · JPL
526963	2007 RL_{30}	—	September 5, 2007	Anderson Mesa	LONEOS	·	1 km	MPC · JPL
526964	2007 RE_{33}	—	September 5, 2007	Anderson Mesa	LONEOS	·	1.4 km	MPC · JPL
526965	2007 RL_{35}	—	September 8, 2007	Bergisch Gladbach	W. Bickel	·	760 m	MPC · JPL
526966	2007 RA_{37}	—	September 8, 2007	Mount Lemmon	Mount Lemmon Survey	·	2.7 km	MPC · JPL
526967	2007 RN_{37}	—	September 8, 2007	Anderson Mesa	LONEOS	·	2.1 km	MPC · JPL
526968	2007 RR_{38}	—	September 8, 2007	Anderson Mesa	LONEOS	·	1.6 km	MPC · JPL
526969	2007 RG_{43}	—	September 9, 2007	Kitt Peak	Spacewatch	EOS	1.9 km	MPC · JPL
526970	2007 RL_{43}	—	September 9, 2007	Kitt Peak	Spacewatch	V	520 m	MPC · JPL
526971	2007 RR_{44}	—	September 9, 2007	Kitt Peak	Spacewatch	·	730 m	MPC · JPL
526972	2007 RF_{49}	—	September 9, 2007	Mount Lemmon	Mount Lemmon Survey	·	3.2 km	MPC · JPL
526973	2007 RY_{49}	—	September 9, 2007	Mount Lemmon	Mount Lemmon Survey	·	1.0 km	MPC · JPL
526974	2007 RU_{50}	—	September 9, 2007	Kitt Peak	Spacewatch	·	3.0 km	MPC · JPL
526975	2007 RP_{51}	—	September 9, 2007	Kitt Peak	Spacewatch	·	710 m	MPC · JPL
526976	2007 RX_{51}	—	September 9, 2007	Kitt Peak	Spacewatch	·	510 m	MPC · JPL
526977	2007 RY_{54}	—	September 9, 2007	Kitt Peak	Spacewatch	·	2.4 km	MPC · JPL
526978	2007 RM_{60}	—	September 10, 2007	Catalina	CSS	·	1.1 km	MPC · JPL
526979	2007 RK_{63}	—	August 10, 2007	Kitt Peak	Spacewatch	·	710 m	MPC · JPL
526980	2007 RD_{66}	—	September 10, 2007	Mount Lemmon	Mount Lemmon Survey	·	1.8 km	MPC · JPL
526981	2007 RB_{68}	—	September 10, 2007	Kitt Peak	Spacewatch	·	790 m	MPC · JPL
526982	2007 RR_{69}	—	September 10, 2007	Kitt Peak	Spacewatch	·	1.7 km	MPC · JPL
526983	2007 RT_{69}	—	September 10, 2007	Kitt Peak	Spacewatch	MIS	1.7 km	MPC · JPL
526984	2007 RB_{80}	—	September 10, 2007	Mount Lemmon	Mount Lemmon Survey	·	2.5 km	MPC · JPL
526985	2007 RE_{84}	—	September 3, 2007	Catalina	CSS	·	500 m	MPC · JPL
526986	2007 RB_{86}	—	September 10, 2007	Mount Lemmon	Mount Lemmon Survey	·	1.3 km	MPC · JPL
526987	2007 RS_{87}	—	April 8, 2006	Kitt Peak	Spacewatch	·	2.0 km	MPC · JPL
526988	2007 RN_{92}	—	September 10, 2007	Mount Lemmon	Mount Lemmon Survey	MAS	530 m	MPC · JPL
526989	2007 RA_{94}	—	September 10, 2007	Kitt Peak	Spacewatch	NYS	1.1 km	MPC · JPL
526990	2007 RJ_{99}	—	September 11, 2007	Kitt Peak	Spacewatch	·	710 m	MPC · JPL
526991	2007 RD_{113}	—	September 11, 2007	Kitt Peak	Spacewatch	·	1.8 km	MPC · JPL
526992	2007 RT_{115}	—	September 11, 2007	Kitt Peak	Spacewatch	·	620 m	MPC · JPL
526993	2007 RM_{117}	—	September 11, 2007	Kitt Peak	Spacewatch	·	2.1 km	MPC · JPL
526994	2007 RN_{117}	—	September 11, 2007	Kitt Peak	Spacewatch	EOS	1.7 km	MPC · JPL
526995	2007 RX_{117}	—	September 11, 2007	Kitt Peak	Spacewatch	·	4.1 km	MPC · JPL
526996	2007 RP_{118}	—	September 11, 2007	Mount Lemmon	Mount Lemmon Survey	·	830 m	MPC · JPL
526997 Hohai	2007 RP_{119}	Hohai	September 11, 2007	XuYi	PMO NEO Survey Program	EUN	1.2 km	MPC · JPL
526998	2007 RE_{122}	—	September 12, 2007	Catalina	CSS	EUN	1.2 km	MPC · JPL
526999	2007 RV_{131}	—	September 12, 2007	Mount Lemmon	Mount Lemmon Survey	·	2.5 km	MPC · JPL
527000	2007 RK_{135}	—	September 8, 2007	Anderson Mesa	LONEOS	NYS	1.1 km	MPC · JPL

back to top

== Meaning of names ==
As minor planet discoveries are confirmed, they are given a permanent number by the IAU's Minor Planet Center (MPC), and the discoverers can then submit names for them, following the IAU's naming conventions. The list below concerns those minor planets in the specified number-range that have received names, and explains the meanings of those names.

Official naming citations of newly named small Solar System bodies are approved and published in a bulletin by IAU's Working Group for Small Bodies Nomenclature (WGSBN). Before May 2021, citations were published in MPC's Minor Planet Circulars for many decades. Recent citations can also be found on the JPL Small-Body Database (SBDB). Until his death in 2016, German astronomer Lutz D. Schmadel compiled these citations into the Dictionary of Minor Planet Names (DMP) and regularly updated the collection.

Based on Paul Herget's The Names of the Minor Planets, Schmadel also researched the unclear origin of numerous asteroids, most of which had been named prior to World War II. This article incorporates text from this source, which is in the public domain: SBDB New namings may only be added to this list below after official publication as the preannouncement of names is condemned. The WGSBN publishes a comprehensive guideline for the naming rules of non-cometary small Solar System bodies.

Named minor planet	Provisional	This minor planet was named for...	Ref · Catalog
526460 Ceciliakoocen	2006 QY_{89}	The Dr. Cecilia Koo Botanic Conservation Center (KBCC) in Taiwan possesses the world's largest collection of approximately 34,000 taxa of tropical and subtropical living plants and provides researches around the globe with materials from their collection for free (Src).	IAU · 526460
526492 Theaket	2006 RQ_{109}	Amalthea Ketskarova Masiero (born 2021) is the daughter of the American astronomer Joseph Masiero, who discovered this minor planet.	IAU · 526492
526997 Hohai	2007 RP_{119}	Hohai University, a public university in Nanjing, Jiangsu, China. It is famed for its research in water resources, hydrology and hydraulic engineering.	IAU · 526997
