= Chester Koo =

Taiwanese business executive

- 辜啟允
- Born: 1952; Taipei, Taiwan
- Died: 24 December 2001 (aged 48–49); Taipei, Taiwan
- Education: Tunghai University (BA); University of Pennsylvania (MBA)
- Father: Koo Chen-fu
- Relatives: Leslie Koo (brother)

Chester Koo (Chinese: 辜啟允; pinyin: Gū Qǐyǔn; Wade–Giles: Ku Ch'i-yün; 1952–2001) was a Taiwanese business executive. He was a third-generation member of the Koo family, a prominent business family in Taiwan.

== Early life and education ==
Koo was born in 1952 in Taipei, Taiwan. After graduating from Taipei Municipal Chien Kuo High School, he earned a bachelor's degree in economics from Tunghai University. He then earned a Master of Business Administration (MBA) from the Wharton School of the University of Pennsylvania in 1979.

== Life and career ==
After his graduation and subsequent return to Taiwan, Koo managed a branch of Chinatrust Bank, and at age 35 was appointed president of the China Life Insurance Company.

Koo later led many other Koos Group (KGI) subsidiaries and was active in the media industry. He was responsible for KGI's 1997 acquisition of Chinese Television Network (CTN).

Koo eventually sold CTN in January 2000, having never turned a profit. In an attempt to increase the market share of China Network Systems (CNS), a cable company owned by KGI, Koo restructured CNS and sought investors to form a media conglomerate, becoming partners with Rupert Murdoch in the process. Though he was credited with helping Koos Group gain a foothold in new industries, many of Koo's investments were also regarded as risky, and multiple ventures lost money. He resigned his position at China Life in December 2001.

As a result, Koo became less involved with Koos Group business ventures, except for Hoshin Gigamedia Center Inc. which he had founded in October 1998. Under his leadership, GigaMedia reached an agreement with Microsoft and began working on a set-top box design suitable for broadband Internet via cable services. In November 1999, Microsoft bought a ten percent stake in GigaMedia. The next year, GigaMedia began work with Yahoo Inc. on building a website which offered multimedia entertainment to GigaMedia customers.

Shortly after leaving China Life, Koo died from gallbladder cancer on 24 December 2001, aged 49. Later, Leslie Koo split Koos Group holdings with cousin Jeffrey Koo. Together, the two returned KGI to profitability.

== Personal life ==
Chester Koo's father Koo Chen-fu and younger brother Leslie Koo were also businessmen. Chester Koo's only son was Koo Kung-yi.
