= KGI Life Insurance =

KGI Life Insurance Co., Ltd. 凱基人壽保險股份有限公司
- Company type: Privately owned company
- Industry: Life insurance
- Founded: 1963
- Headquarters: Taipei, Taiwan
- Parent: KGI Financial Holding
- Website: KGI Life

KGI Life Insurance, is a life insurance company in Taiwan. The company was founded in 1963 by Jeffrey Koo Sr., the Koo Family, as Overseas Life Insurance Corporation. Today, the company is chaired by Angelo Koo, the fourth-generation of the Koo Family.

== See also ==
- List of companies of Taiwan
