= Leslie Koo =

Taiwanese business executive and billionaire

Koo Cheng-yun
- 辜成允
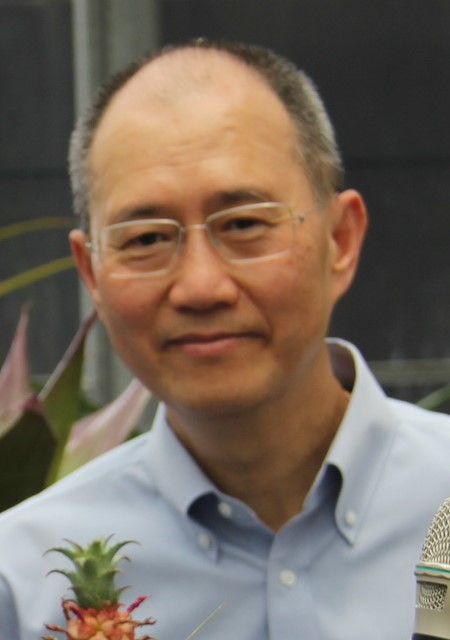
- Born: 28 November 1954; Taiwan
- Died: 23 January 2017 (aged 62); Taipei, Taiwan
- Other name: Gu Chengyun
- Education: University of Washington (BA); University of Pennsylvania (MBA)
- Occupation: Businessperson
- Parent: Koo Chen-fu
- Relatives: Chester Koo (brother)

Koo Cheng-yun (Chinese: 辜成允; pinyin: Gū Chéngyǔn; Wade–Giles: Ku Ch'eng-yün; 28 November 1954 – 23 January 2017), also known by his English name Leslie Koo, was a Taiwanese business executive and billionaire who served as Chairman of Taiwan Cement Corporation. He was the second son of the prominent businessman and diplomat Koo Chen-fu, and a member of the Lukang Koo clan, one of the five wealthiest families of Taiwan.

== Early life and education ==
Koo was born in Taiwan on 28 November 1954. He was educated in the United States, where he graduated from the University of Washington in 1977 with a Bachelor of Arts (B.A.) in accounting and earned a Master of Business Administration (M.B.A.) from the Wharton School of the University of Pennsylvania in 1981.

== Career ==
After the death of his elder brother Chester in late 2001, Leslie took over the management of Taiwan Cement Corporation (TCC) in 2003. The company was at the time mired in NT$25 billion of debt because several risky investments made by Chester in the previous ten years had gone bad.

Over the objection of some board members, Koo decided to invest in mainland Chinese cement businesses, which helped the company to turn around and double its revenue in thirteen years, making Taiwan Cement the world's twelfth largest cement company and the sixth biggest in China. He was credited with saving the business.

Koo's net worth was estimated at US$1.2 billion. Despite his wealth, he reportedly flew economy class and ate at night markets. Koo refused to retain bodyguards, believing their presence to be a snobbish, insulting admission that the wealthy could not be seen alongside others of lower socioeconomic status. After Li Chia-wei met Koo to discuss ideas for a plant shelter in 2006, Koo agreed to fund the project, operated by the Dr. Cecilia Koo Botanic Conservation Center (KBCC), on land in Gaoshu, Pingtung provided by Leslie Koo.

== Bribery scandal ==
In June 2003, Dayu Development Corporation, the Koo family's property subsidiary, was on the verge of insolvency and threatening the survival of the family business. To raise emergency funds, Leslie Koo needed to sell a parcel of land in Longtan District, Taoyuan owned by Dayu. He paid what he called a "commission" to an associate of the then first lady Wu Shu-chen, and in exchange President Chen Shui-bian arranged for the Hsinchu Science and Industrial Park to rent and then buy the parcel, which was incorporated into the Longtan Science Park.

In 2008, Koo met with prosecutors investigating corruption charges against Chen Shui-bian. Chen was convicted in 2010 and sentenced to 20 years in prison, including 11 years for taking a NT$400 million bribe from Koo in the Longtan land transaction. In a subsequent interview with the media, Koo said that "I don't have any special feelings about the case."

== Death ==
On 21 January 2017, Koo fell down a flight of stairs while attending a wedding banquet at the Regent Taipei Hotel. He was sent to Mackay Memorial Hospital and then transferred to Cheng Hsin General Hospital, where he died from cerebral haemorrhage on 23 January 2017. Taiwan Cement appointed Koo's brother-in-law Nelson Chang An-ping (張安平) as his successor.
