= Chinatrust Financial Building =

Office building in Xinyi District, Taipei, Taiwan

Chinatrust Financial Building 中國信託松壽大樓
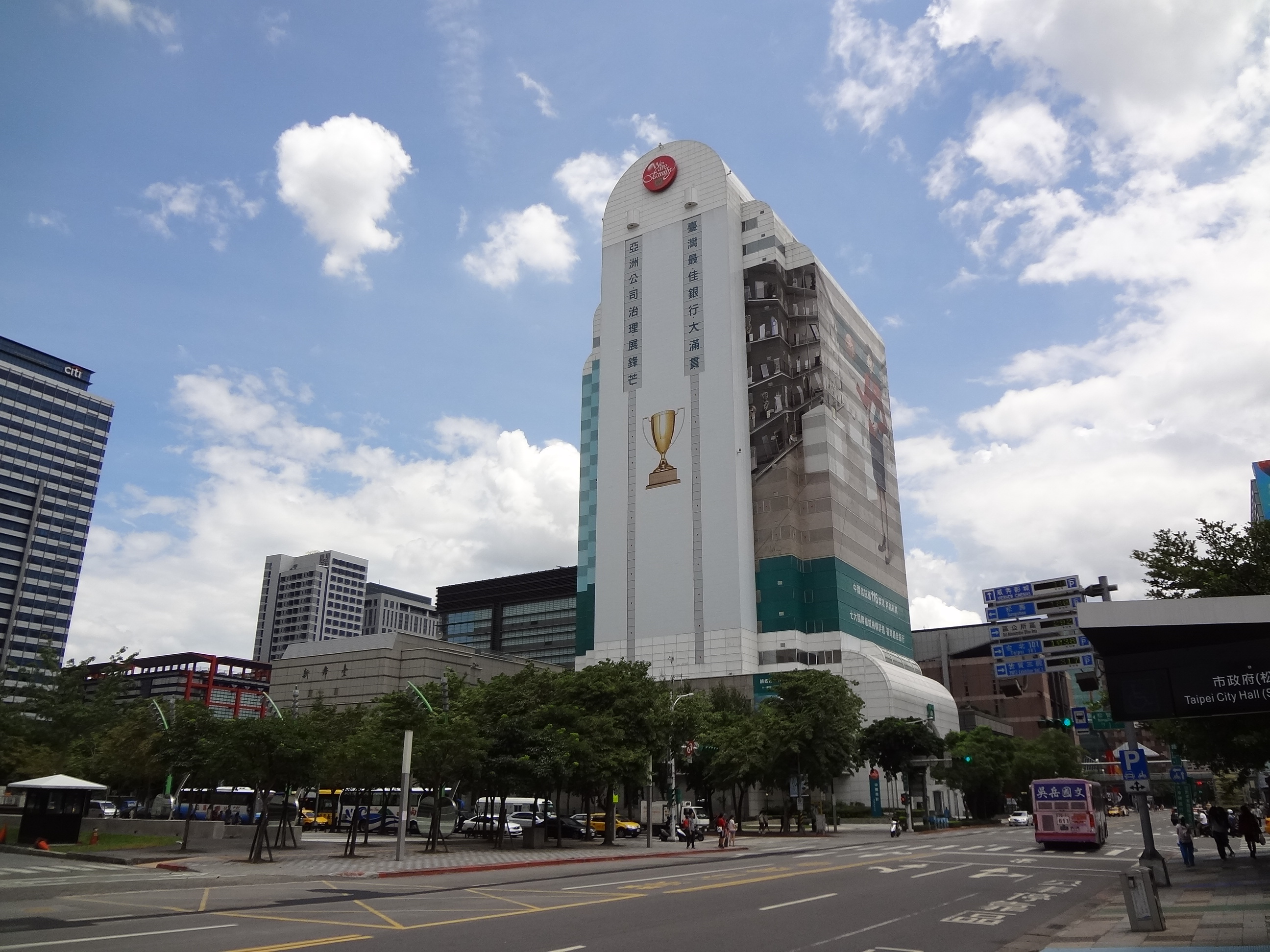
- Interactive map of the Chinatrust Financial Building 中國信託松壽大樓 area

General information
- Status: Demolished
- Type: Office building
- Classification: Office
- Location: No. 3, Songshou Road, Xinyi Special District, Taipei, Taiwan
- Coordinates: 25°2′11.4″N 121°33′57.8″E
- Completed: 1996
- Demolished: 2016

Height
- Roof: 279 ft (85 m)

Technical details
- Floor count: 22
- Floor area: 62,492 m^{2} (672,660 sq ft)

Design and construction
- Architect: Mitsui Realties

Chinatrust Financial Building, or Chinatrust Group Tower (Chinese: 中國信託松壽大樓), was a 22-storey, 279 ft (85 m) office building completed in 1996 and located in Xinyi Special District, Taipei, Taiwan. The building had a total floor area of 62,492 m^{2} (672,660 sq ft) with two basement levels. The building served as the corporate headquarters of the Taiwanese bank CTBC Financial Holding, before it was demolished in 2016 to make way for Taipei Sky Tower. CTBC Financial Holding's new corporate headquarters was then subsequently relocated to CTBC Financial Park in Nangang District.

== See also ==
- List of tallest buildings in Taiwan
- List of tallest buildings in Taipei
- CTBC Financial Park
- CTBC Financial Holding
- Taipei Sky Tower
