= The Sky Taipei =

Skyscraper under construction in Taipei, Taiwan

The Sky Taipei 台北天空塔
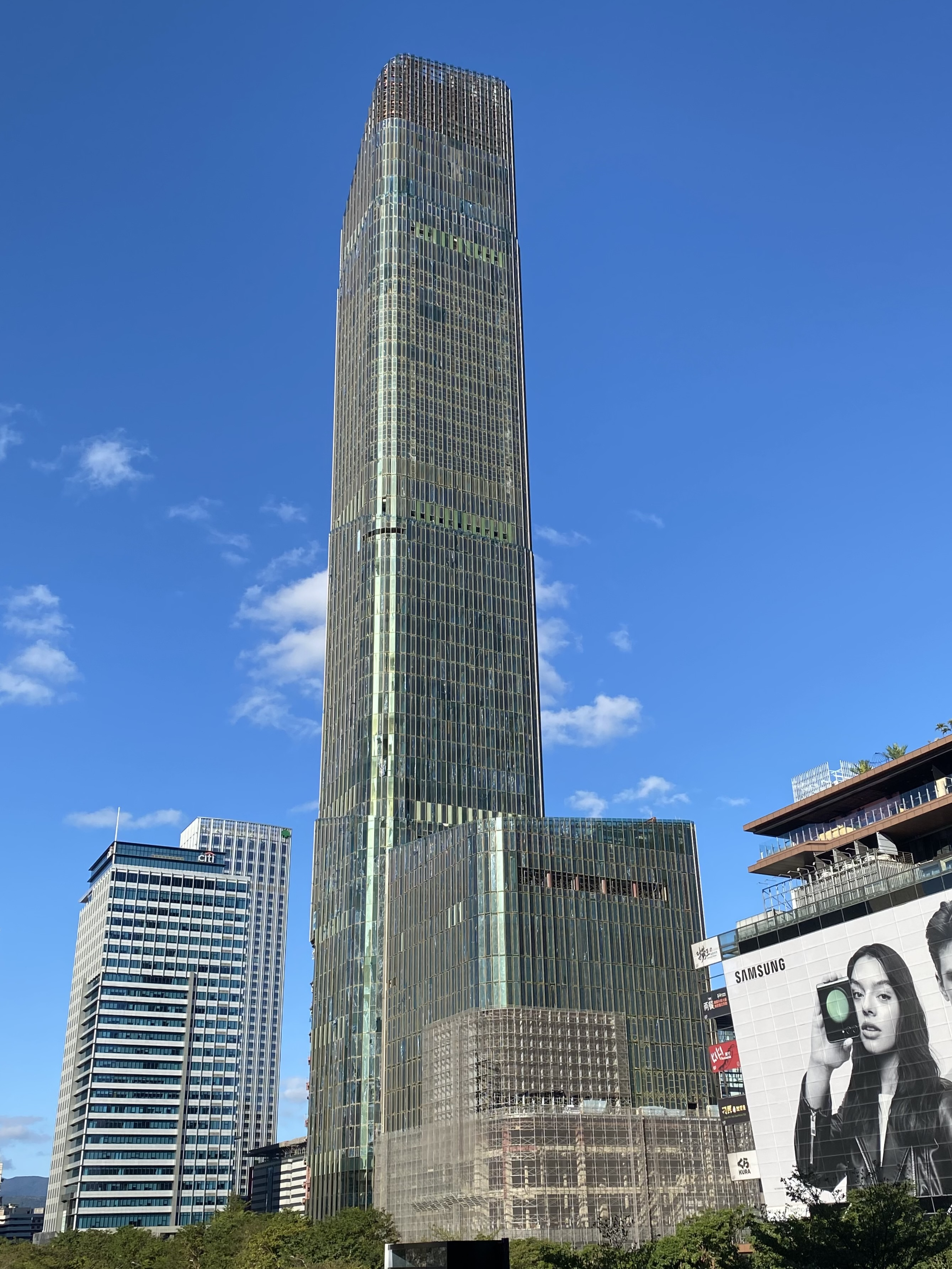
- The tower in January 2024
- Hotel chain: Andaz, Park Hyatt

General information
- Status: Topped-out
- Type: Hotel, Department store
- Location: Xinyi Special District, Xinyi, Taipei, Taiwan
- Coordinates: 25°2′11.4″N 121°33′57.8″E
- Construction started: 2019

Height
- Roof: 280 metres

Technical details
- Floor count: 56
- Floor area: 87,464.32m^{2}

Design and construction
- Architects: Antonio Citterio, Patricia Viel

Website
- theskytaipei.com

The Sky Taipei (Chinese: 台北天空塔) is a skyscraper under construction in Taipei, Taiwan. Upon completion, it will be the third-tallest building in Taiwan and the second-tallest in Xinyi Special District and Taipei. The height of the building will be 280 m (920 ft) with a floor area of 87,464.32 m^{2} (941,458.1 sq ft), comprising 56 floors above ground as well as 5 basement levels.

== History ==
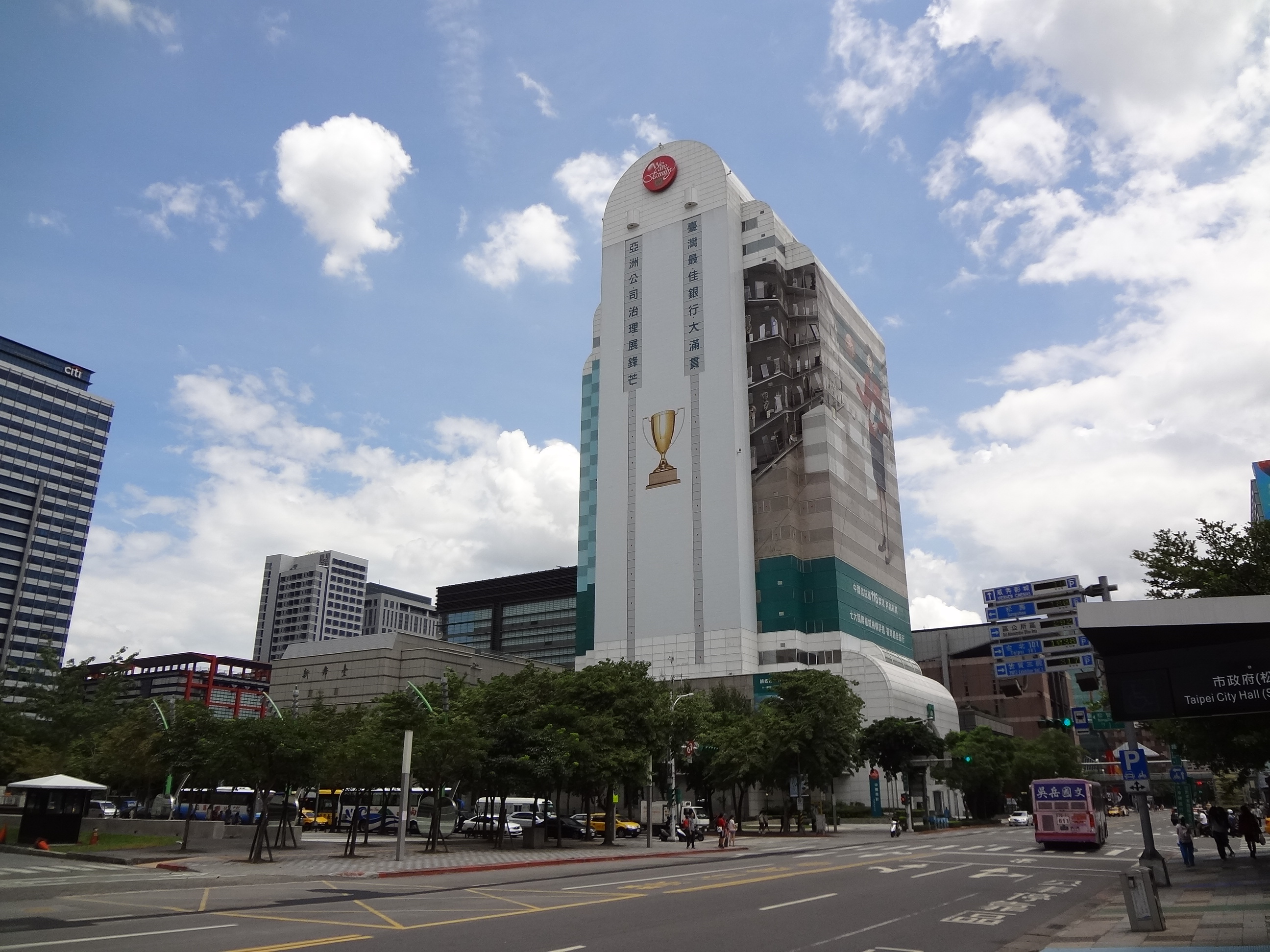
Chinatrust Financial Building

The Sky Taipei is located on the site of the former Chinatrust Financial Building, the headquarters of CTBC Financial Holding, which was built in 1996 and was demolished in 2016 to make way for the new building.

Construction started in 2019 with an anticipated completion date 2025. The building is still under construction.

The tower will house two luxury hotels by Hyatt: Andaz Taipei and Park Hyatt Taipei.

== Gallery ==
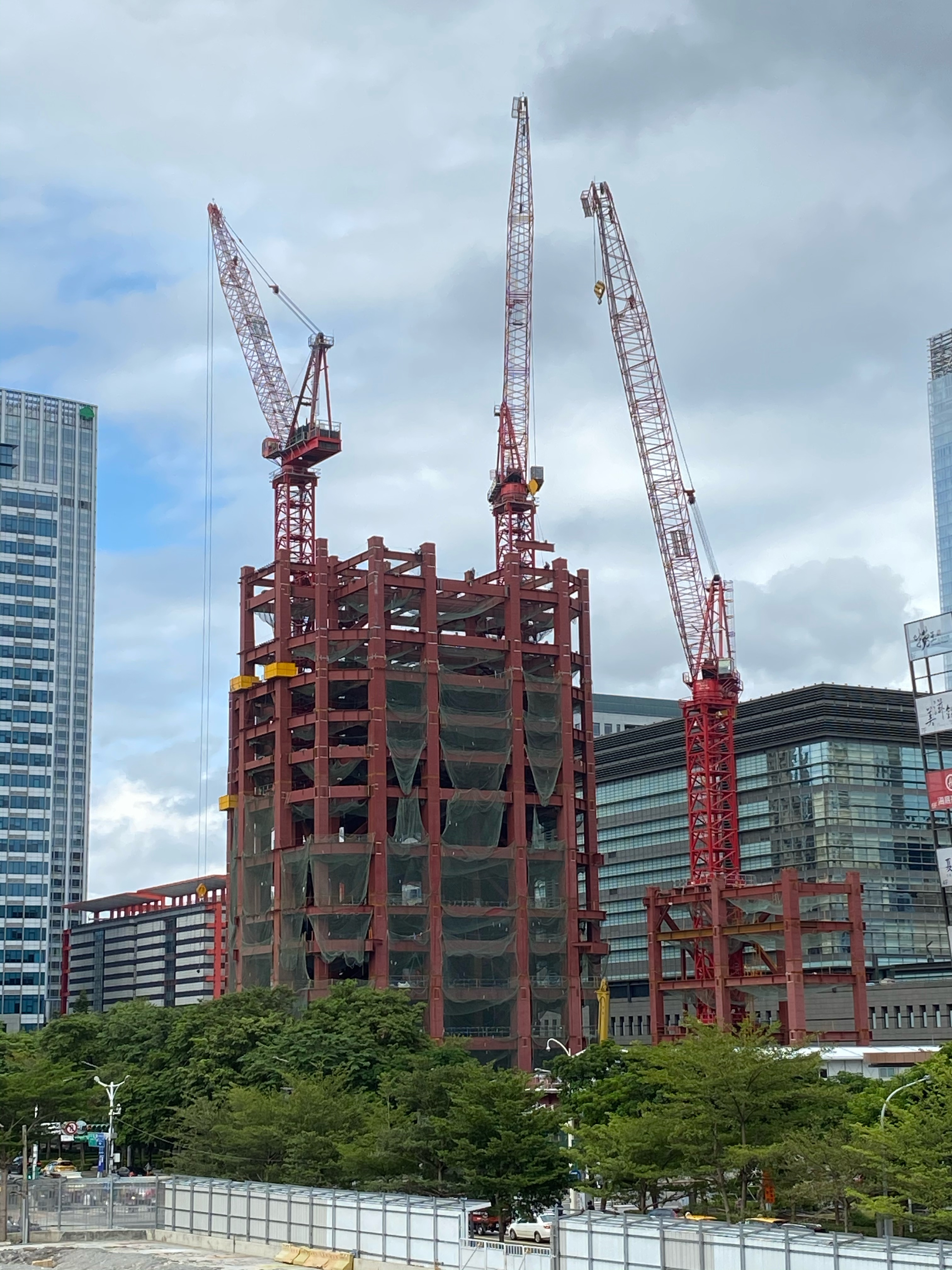
October 2021

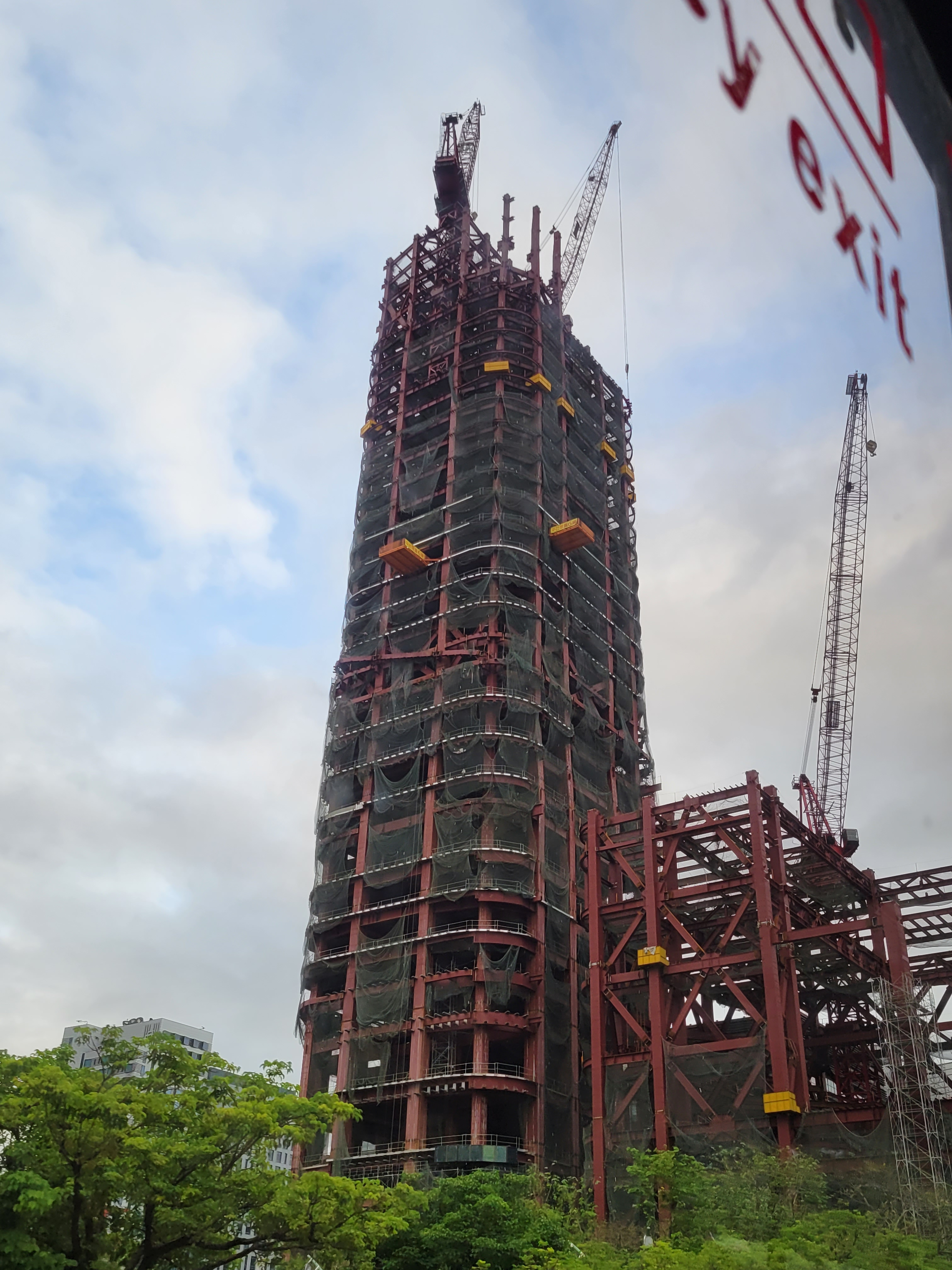
May 2022

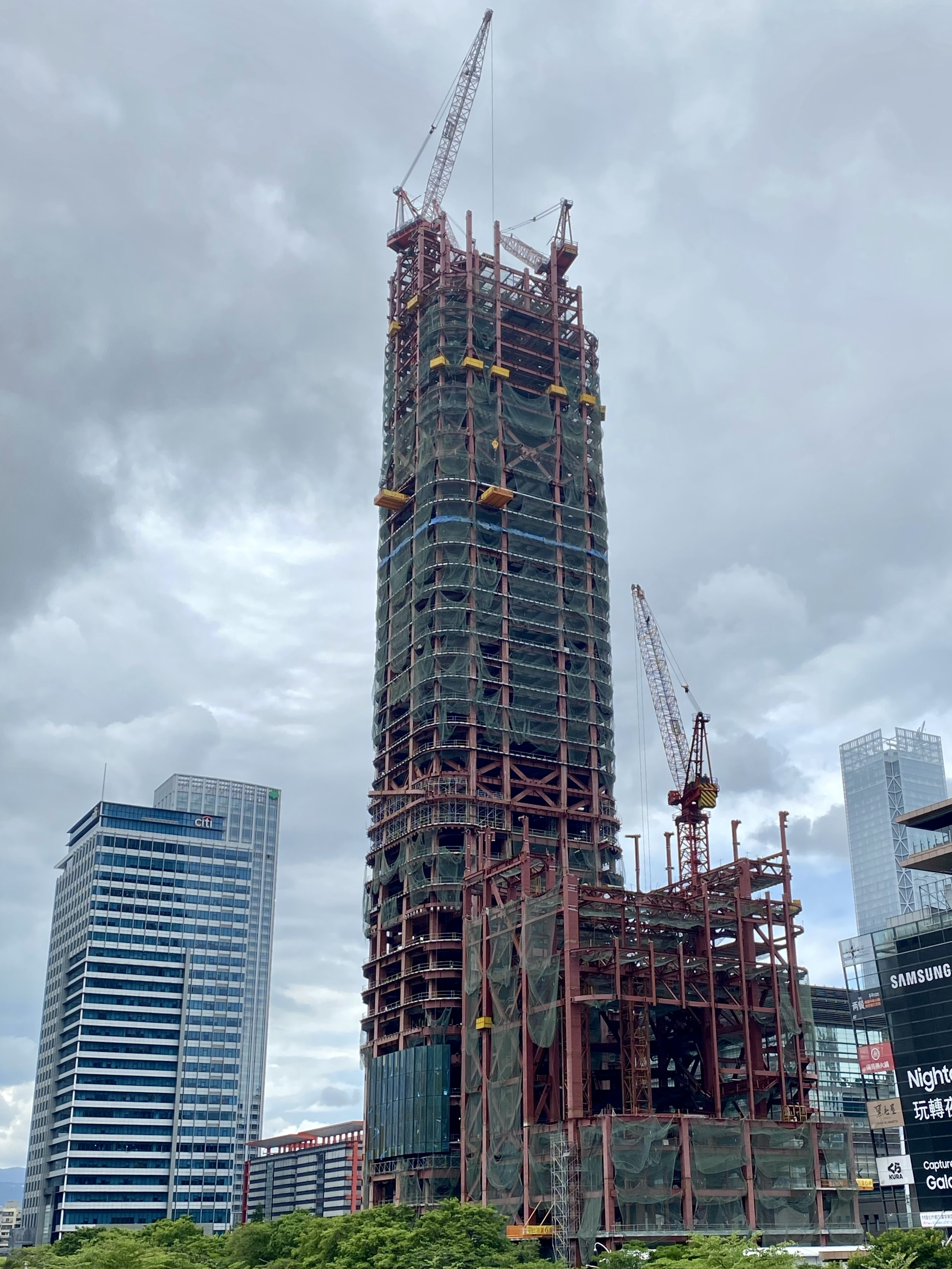
July 2022

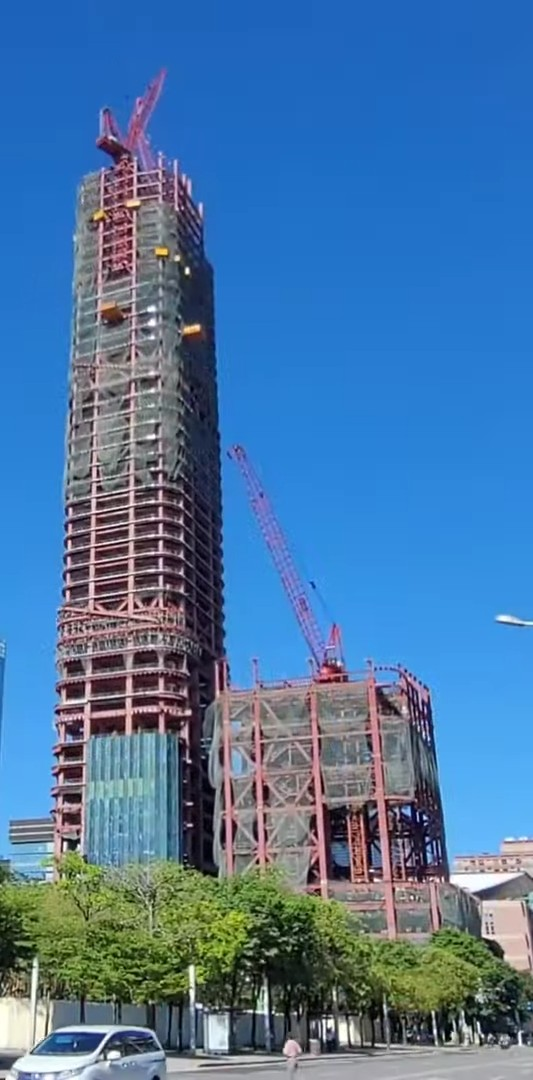
August 2022

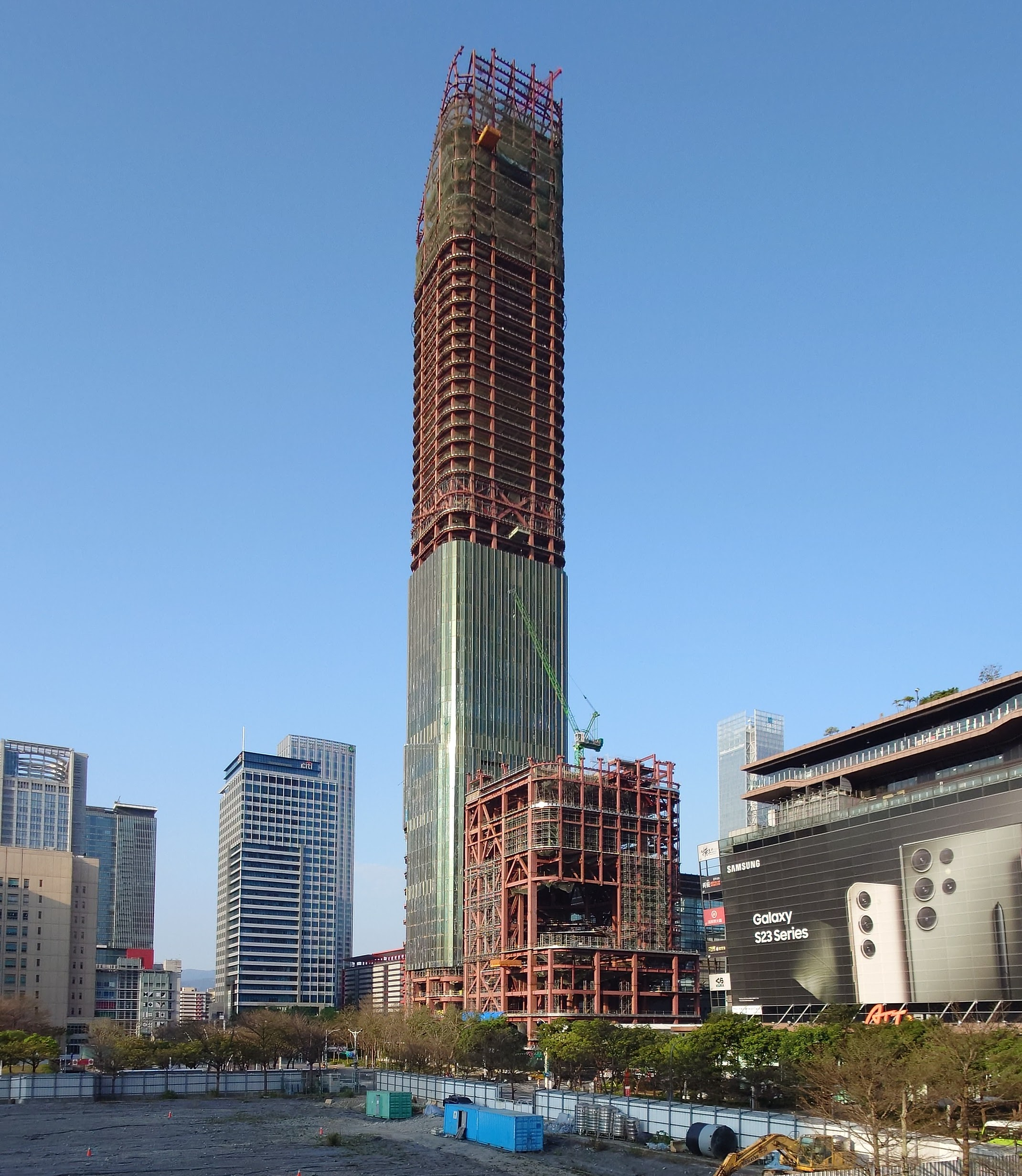
March 2023

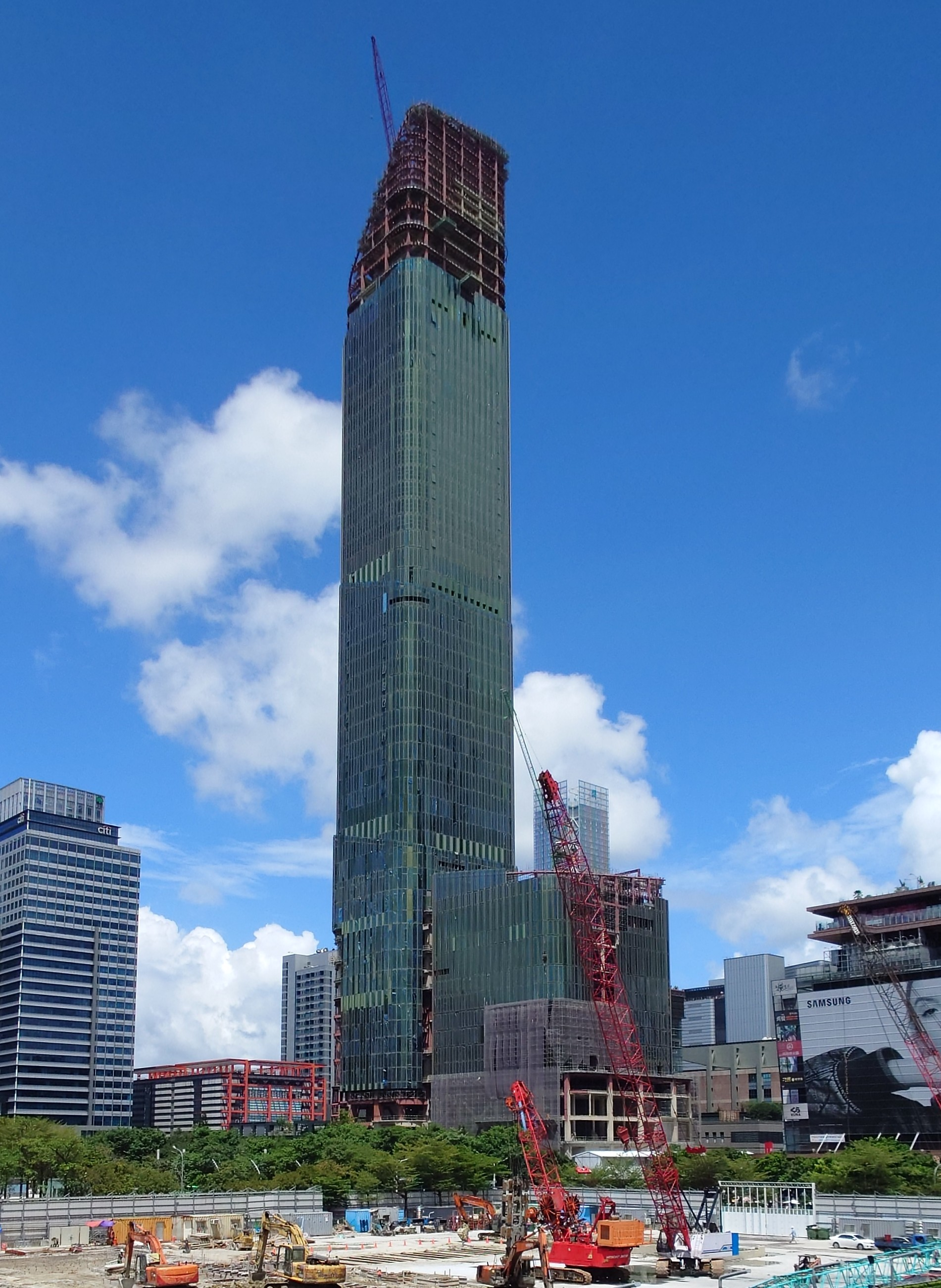
September 2023

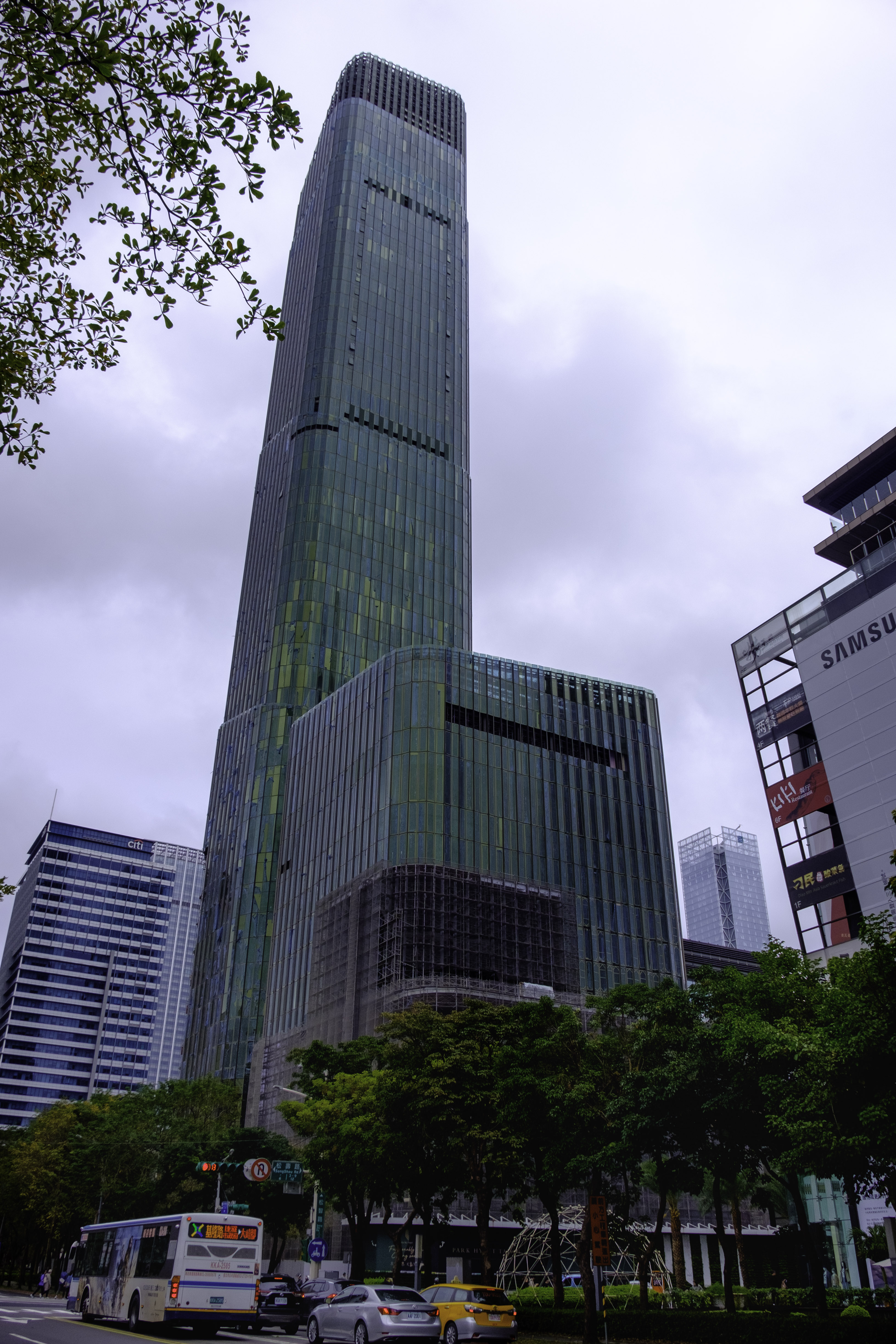
February 2024

== See also ==
- List of tallest buildings in Taipei
- List of tallest buildings in Taiwan
