= CTBC Taichung Headquarters =

Skyscraper office building in Xitun, Taichung, Taiwan

CTBC Taichung Headquarters 中信金控臺中金融大樓
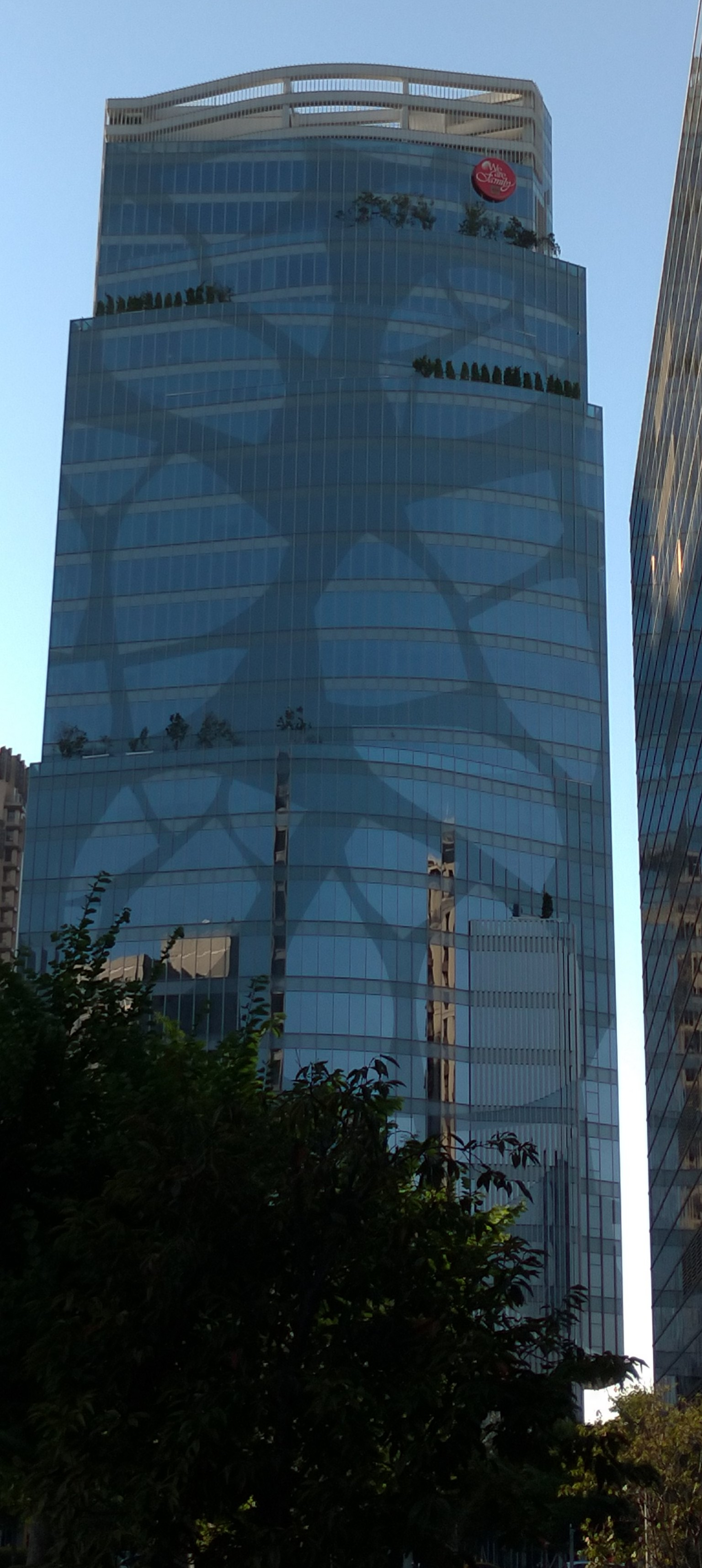
- Interactive map of the CTBC Taichung Headquarters 中信金控臺中金融大樓 area

General information
- Status: Completed
- Type: Office
- Location: No. 88, Huizhong Road, Xitun District, Taichung, Taiwan
- Coordinates: 24.175944104664985°N 120.6692842184155°E
- Construction started: 2014
- Completed: 2017

Height
- Architectural: 132.3 metres (434 ft)

Technical details
- Floor count: 28
- Floor area: 40,615 m^{2} (437,180 sq ft)

The CTBC Taichung Headquarters (Chinese: 中信金控臺中金融大樓; pinyin: Zhōngxìn jīn táizhōng jīnróng dàlóu), is a skyscraper office building located in Taichung's 7th Redevelopment Zone, Xitun District, Taichung, Taiwan. Construction of the building began in 2014 and it was completed in 2017. The height of the building is 132.2 m (434 ft), the floor area is 40,615 m^{2} (437,180 sq ft), and it comprises 28 floors above ground, as well as six basement levels. It houses the headquarters of CTBC Financial Holding as well as Taiwan Life Insurance.

== Design ==
The building was designed by the Spanish architectural team EMBT led by the architects Enric Miralles and Benedetta Tagliabue. The design adopts an open and curved form in contrast to the traditional rectangular urban landscape, allowing the building to communicate and establish connections with the surrounding vertical buildings, thus creating a recognizable landmark in Taichung.

== See also ==
- List of tallest buildings in Taiwan
- List of tallest buildings in Taichung
- Taichung's 7th Redevelopment Zone
- CTBC Financial Holding
- CTBC Financial Park
