= Noor Menai =

Pakistani-American banker

Noor Menai is a Pakistani-American banker. He has served as the president and CEO of Charles Schwab Bank (2006–07) and of CTBC Bank USA (2010–present).

== Background ==
Menai came to the US from Pakistan at the age of 19. He attended the University of Rochester in New York state from 1986 to 1989, receiving a bachelor's degree in economics. He received an MBA from the university the following year. Menai attended the Kellogg School of Management at Northwestern University in Illinois in 1994.

Menai's banking career began at JPMorgan Chase in 1990, where he worked in branch support and other retail banking positions. In 1997, he joined Citibank, where he remained for the next nine years in a variety of roles, eventually becoming a managing director in the Corporate and Investment bank.

== Charles Schwab and Fajr Capital ==
In 2006, Menai became president and CEO of Charles Schwab Bank, holding the position for 11 months. In this role, he oversaw a re-designed deposit platform for the bank, titled "World’s Best Checking." He worked to institute technological innovation at Charles Schwab, for example permitting employees to have multiple configurations on their computers for work and for personal use. In 2007, Menai helped to found Fajr Capital, a sovereign-backed private equity firm based in Dubai, United Arab Emirates.

== CTBC Bank ==
Menai was made the president and CEO of CTBC Bank (USA), headquartered in Los Angeles, in 2010. He worked to expand the bank's small business lending, arguing that small businesses were often more flexible in response to marketplace demands than large ones. An important part of CTBC's business is assisting with investment and immigration from China. Menai opposes "Cold War" thinking in US/Chinese relations, believing that it harms the economies of both nations and leads to "wasted treasure and a stalemate neither we nor the rest of the world can afford." After the turmoil in Chinese markets in late 2015/early 2016, Menai predicted to the Los Angeles Times that more Chinese investors would be moving money overseas, creating further business opportunities for banks like CTBC.
