= CTBC Bank =

Taiwanese commercial bank

CTBC Commercial Bank Co., Ltd. 中國信託商業銀行股份有限公司
- Company type: Private
- Industry: Banking
- Founded: March 14, 1966; 60 years ago
- Founder: Jeffrey Koo Sr.
- Headquarters: Taipei, Taiwan
- Area served: Worldwide
- Key people: Chairman: Morris Li; CEO: Larry Hsu; President: James Chen Chia-Wen (since 2011)
- Revenue: $13.2 billion (2024)
- Number of employees: 27,000+
- Parent: CTBC Financial Holding
- Website: www.ctbcbank.com

CTBC Bank
- Traditional Chinese: 中國信託銀行
- Simplified Chinese: 中国信托银行
- Literal meaning: China Trust Bank
Transcriptions
Standard Mandarin
- Hanyu Pinyin: Zhōngguó Xìntuō Yínháng
Southern Min
- Hokkien POJ: Tiong-kok Sìn-thok Gûn-hâng

Alternative Chinese name
- Traditional Chinese: 中信銀行
- Simplified Chinese: 中信银行
Transcriptions
Standard Mandarin
- Hanyu Pinyin: Zhōngxìn Yínháng
Southern Min
- Hokkien POJ: Tiong-sìn Gûn-hâng

CTBC Bank, (Note: previously and still known in Chinese as Chinatrust Bank.) a subsidiary of CTBC Financial Holding founded in 1966, is Taiwan's largest private bank and its second-largest commercial bank by equity.

== History ==
It was established in 1966 under the name China Securities and Investment Corporation. In 1971, its name was changed to Chinatrust Investment Company Limited. In 1992, it was transformed into Chinatrust Commercial Bank, shortened to Chinatrust Bank. In 2013, its English name was changed to CTBC Bank, which the company noted was "not an abbreviation" referring to Chinatrust Banking Corporation; the Chinese-language name meaning "Chinatrust Bank" was unchanged.

The bank has subsidiaries in the Philippines, the United States, Canada, Japan, Thailand and Indonesia, foreign branch offices in Singapore, Hong Kong, mainland China, India, Japan, and Vietnam, and foreign representative offices in London, Bangkok, Hanoi, Beijing, Manila, and Los Angeles.

CTBC Bank was awarded by international professional agencies as Best Bank in Taiwan in Asiamoney and The Asset magazines. In the area of corporate banking, CTBC Bank was recognized by Global Finance and Asiamoney as the Best Foreign Exchange Bank in Taiwan, while Global Finance, The Asset, The Asian Banker, The Corporate Treasurer, and Global Trade Review magazines named CTBC Bank Taiwan's Best Trade Finance Bank. CTBC Bank was awarded Best Retail Bank in Taiwan by The Asian Banker for the ninth time and was named Taiwan's Best Wealth Management Bank in Euromoney for the eleventh time.

== Philippine subsidiary ==
CTBC Bank (Philippines) Corp. is a subsidiary of Chinatrust Commercial Bank Corp. of Taiwan. It is listed on the Philippine Stock Exchange, but the majority of shares are held by Chinatrust Taiwan. In November 2000, Chinatrust Taiwan agreed to purchase 63,526,127 shares of Chinatrust Philippines at P19 per share from a group of shareholders led by then-President William Go, increasing its shareholding from 57.5% to 91%. However, there was some uncertainty surrounding this transaction, as with a public float of less than 10% of shares outstanding, Chinatrust Philippines would have to be delisted. In the end, Chinatrust Philippines was able to remain listed by declaring its intention to issue more shares through a secondary market offering, and paying fines to the exchange in the meantime. However, in 2012, CCB has been delisted from the Philippine Stock Exchange.

Chinatrust Philippines' president is currently Steve Tsai. Its 23 branches give it one of the most extensive branch networks among foreign-owned banks in the Philippines.

== United States subsidiary ==
CTBC Bank Corp. (USA) was one of the first Asian American banks to operate both in the Eastern and Western United States. Services provided include issuance of letters of credit as well as real estate and construction loans. In November 2012, Noor Menai was named President & CEO.

CTBC USA has its heaviest presence in Southern California with its main branch in Downtown Los Angeles, along with Industry, Arcadia, Irvine, Monterey Park, San Gabriel, San Marino, and Rowland Heights. Three locations are in the San Francisco Bay Area, including San Francisco's Embarcadero, Cupertino, and Milpitas, and the bank has three locations in Greater New York, including Sunset Park, Brooklyn, Flushing, and Edison, New Jersey. The bank uses Allpoint as its nationwide ATM network provider.

== Canadian subsidiary ==
CTBC Bank Corp. (Canada) is a Schedule II bank, mainly operating in Metro Vancouver through three branches in the Vancouver neighbourhood Fairview, Richmond, and Burnaby, along with a suburban Toronto branch in Markham.

== See also ==
- List of companies of Taiwan
- List of banks in Taiwan
