= Jeffrey Koo Sr. =

Taiwanese banker (1933–2012)

- 辜濂松
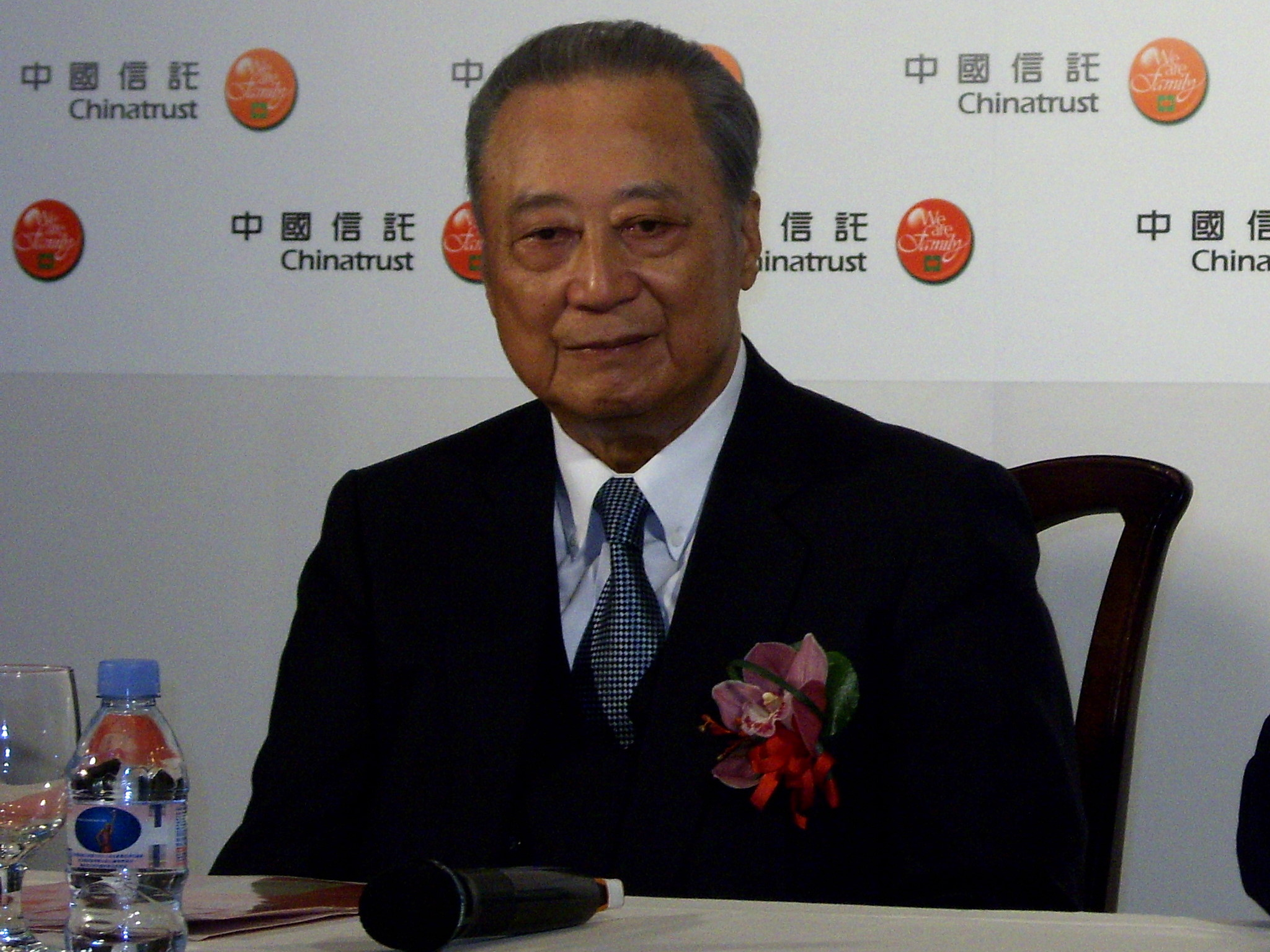
- Born: September 8, 1933; Taichū, Taiwan, Empire of Japan
- Died: December 6, 2012 (aged 79); New York City, U.S.
- Education: Soochow University (BA); New York University (MBA)
- Occupation: banker
- Spouse: Koo Lin Jui-hui (Mitzi Koo Hayashi)
- Children: Jeffrey Koo Jr. Angelo Koo Andre Koo Michelle Koo
- Relatives: Koo Chen-fu, Koo Kwang-ming (uncles)
- Awards: Eisenhower Fellowship

Jeffrey Koo Sr. (Chinese: 辜濂松; pinyin: Gū Líansōng; 8 September 1933 – 6 December 2012) was a Taiwanese billionaire banker and the third-generation of the Koo Family who served as honorary chairman and governor of CTBC Financial Holding, and co-founded the Koos Group.

== Early life and family ==
The rise of the Koo family dates back to the late nineteenth century in Lukang, which was the capital at the time. The first generation Koo ancestors held monopolistic investments in camphor, salt, sugar, and land. Today, the Koo Family has a bloodline of at least six generations and is often regarded as one of Taiwan’s “five great families” (臺灣五大家族), a term used in reference to several influential business dynasties in Taiwan’s economic development.

Koo was born in 1933 in Taichū Prefecture in Japanese Taiwan. He graduated from Soochow University in Taipei in 1957 with a B.A. in accounting, then completed graduate studies at in the United States, where he moved to New York City and lived in Brooklyn Heights to attend New York University. In 1962, he earned his Master of Business Administration (M.B.A.) from the New York University Stern School of Business.

== Personal life ==
Around the mid-20th century, Koo co-founded, with his uncle Koo Chen-fu, the Koos Group, a conglomerate of businesses including cement, insurance, financial services, leasing, and hospitality. Chinatrust Financial Holding is one of the largest privately owned commercial banks in Asia. Jeffrey Koo Sr. is the acclaimed "Father of Credit Cards" for introducing the first credit card system into Asia. Koo was also an Eisenhower Fellowship awardee and served as an ambassador-at-large representing Taiwan in cross-strait relations with China, and attended major international forums such as APEC (Asia-Pacific Economic Cooperation).。

Koo is survived by his wife, Koo Lin Jui Hui (Chinese: 辜林瑞慧; pinyin: Gū Lín Ruìhuì; also known as Mitzi Koo Hayashi), and their four children: Jeffrey Koo Jr. (Chinese: 辜仲諒; pinyin: Gū Zhòngliàng), Angelo Koo (Chinese: 辜仲瑩; pinyin: Gū Zhòngyíng), Andre Koo (Chinese: 辜仲立; pinyin: Gū Zhònglì), and Michelle Koo Hayashi (Chinese: 辜仲玉; pinyin: Gū Zhòngyù).

Jeffrey Koo Jr. has held senior leadership roles within CTBC Financial Holding and has been involved in the governance of the family’s financial enterprises. Angelo Koo is a finance executive who serves as chairman and chief executive officer of CDIB Capital Group, the private equity arm associated with the Koo family’s business interests. Andre Koo is associated with Chailease Holding, a major equipment leasing and financial services company operating across Asia, and has been involved in its leadership and international expansion. Michelle Koo Hayashi is a filmmaker and philanthropist involved in cultural and charitable initiatives, reflecting the family’s continued engagement in the arts and philanthropy.

== Family net worth ==
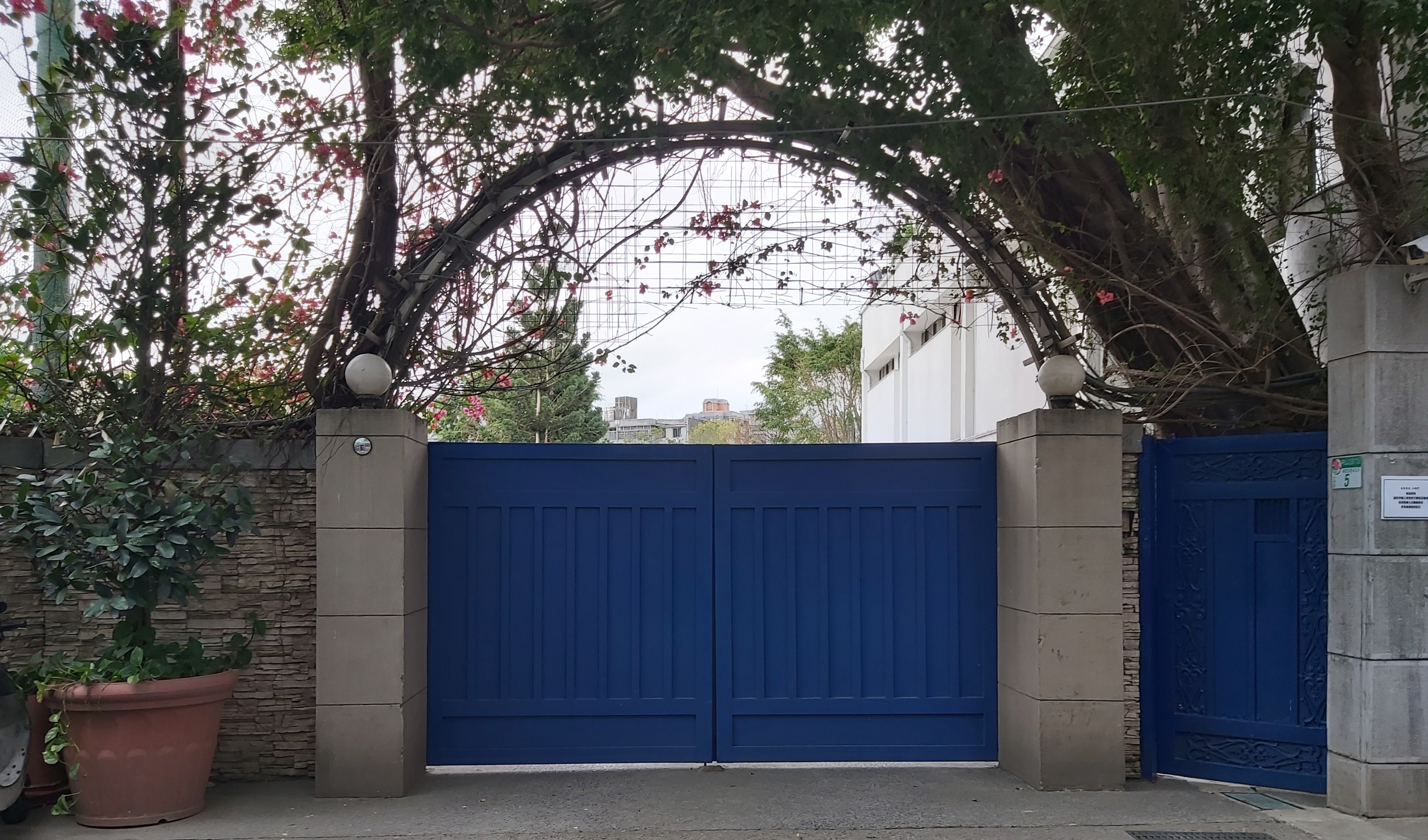
Jeffrey Koo Sr.'s Residence at Tianmu, Shilin District, Taipei

In 2001, The Wall Street Journal reported the total net worth of the Koos Group to be US$36 billion. Today, the total net worth of the Koo Family is estimated to be over US$250 billion.

== Career ==
Koo founded what is now Chinatrust Commercial Bank in 1966. It was established under the identity of China Securities and Investment Corporation. In 1971, its name was changed to Chinatrust Investment Company Limited. In 1992, it was transformed into Chinatrust Commercial Bank.

The bank has subsidiaries in the Philippines, the United States, Canada, and Indonesia, foreign branch offices in Singapore, Hong Kong, India, Japan, and Vietnam, and foreign representative offices in London, Bangkok, Hanoi, Beijing, Manila, and Los Angeles.

CTBC Bank was awarded by international professional agencies as Best Bank in Taiwan in Asiamoney and The Asset magazines. In the area of corporate banking, CTBC Bank was recognized by Global Finance and Asiamoney as the Best Foreign Exchange Bank in Taiwan, while Global Finance, The Asset, The Asian Banker, The Corporate Treasurer, and Global Trade Review magazines named CTBC Bank Taiwan's Best Trade Finance Bank. CTBC Bank was awarded Best Retail Bank in Taiwan by The Asian Banker for the ninth time and was named Taiwan's Best Wealth Management Bank in Euromoney for the eleventh time.

Koo was named Ambassador-at-large, representing Taiwan, mainly in Cross-strait relations.

In June 2008, Forbes ranked him as the sixth richest individual in Taiwan, with a net worth of US$ 2.8 billion.

Koo is also an alumnus of Eisenhower Fellowships and a member of the Board of Trustees and a member of the APEC (Asia-Pacific Economic Cooperation).

== Awards and honorary degrees ==
- Order of the Rising Sun, Gold and Silver Star from the Japanese government, 2012.
- Honorary PhD in Business from De La Salle University in the Philippines (1989)
- Honorary Doctorate from East China Normal University, Shanghai, China (2012)

== Death ==
Koo went to New York City for treatment for Parkinson's disease and died at the Memorial Sloan-Kettering Cancer Center on 6 December 2012.
