= Love, Love, Love (1974 film) =

Opening title of Love, Love, Love

Love, Love, Love (simplified Chinese: 纯纯的爱; traditional Chinese: 純純的愛; pinyin: chún chún de ài) is a Taiwanese film, released in 1974 by Central Motion Pictures Corporation (中央電影事業股份有限公司) and spoken in Mandarin. It stars Charlie Chin as Li Ai-fang (李愛芳) and Brigitte Lin as Lin Chuen-chuen (林純純). Chin Chuan (金川) is co-starring in this film. It was written, composed, and directed by Liu Chia-chang.

Crew

- Koo Chen-fu, supervisor
- Mei Chang-ling (梅長齡), producer
- Cheng Chia-hu (鄭家祜), acting producer
- George F. H. Chang (張法學), planning

== Partial soundtrack ==
Chun chun de ai (純純的愛) is a 1974 album by Chiang Lei (江蕾), released by Hai Shan Record Company, Ltd. (海山唱片). Few songs, like "Chun chun de ai" (纯纯的爱) and "Our Best" (我们最要好), have been later sung by other singers, like Feng Fei-fei and Liu Wen-cheng.

Side A

1. "Chun-Chun's Love" 纯纯的爱 — written by Liu Chia-chang
  Theme song of the film
2. "When We Are Together" 当我们在一起 (dang women zaiyiqi)
3. "Our Best" 我们最要好 (women zui yao hao) — lyrics by Sun Yi (孫儀), music by Liu Chia-chang
4. "Pure Heart" 纯情 (chunqing)
5. "To Make Life Sweet" 让生命芬芳 (rang shengming fenfang)
  Mandarin version of Japanese song, "Shiawaseno Ichiban Hoshi" (しあわせの一番星), by Miyoko Asada (浅田美代子)
6. "Chun-Chun's Love (Instrumental)" 纯纯的爱 (演奏版)

Side B

1. "Chun-Chun's Love" 纯纯的爱 (theme song of the film) — rendered by Liu Chia-chang in this track
2. "Beautiful Fantasy" 美的幻想 (mei de huanxiang)
3. "Beautiful Life" 美丽人生 (meili rensheng)
4. "Lovely Hands" 可爱的手 (ke'ai de shou)
5. "Mi meng" 迷朦
6. "Floral Room" 花香留人间 (huaxiang liu renjian)
