= Koo Chen-fu =

Taiwanese businessman and diplomat (1917–2005)

- 辜振甫
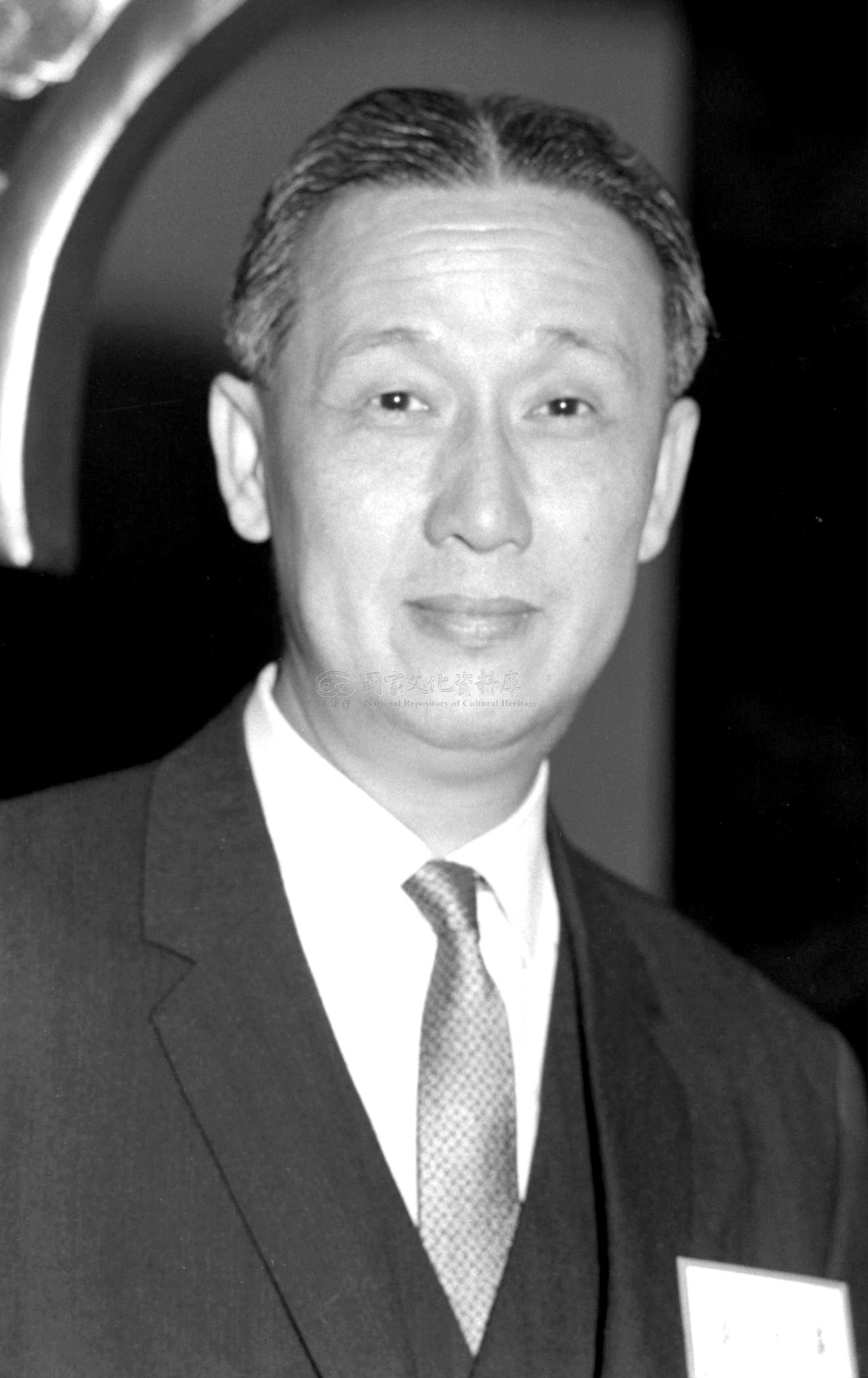
- Koo Chen-fu in 1969

Chairman of the Straits Exchange Foundation
- In office 21 November 1990 – 3 January 2005
- Deputy: Johnnason Liu
- Preceded by: Position established
- Succeeded by: Johnnason Liu (acting); Chang Chun-hsiung

Personal details
- Born: 6 January 1917 Taihoku Chō, Japanese Taiwan
- Died: 3 January 2005 (aged 87) Taipei, Taiwan
- Citizenship: Empire of Japan (before 1945); Republic of China (after 1945)
- Children: Chester; Leslie
- Parent: Koo Hsien-jung (father)
- Relatives: Jeffrey Koo Sr. (nephew); Yan Fu (Grandfather-in-law)
- Education: National Taiwan University (LLB); University of Tokyo (LLM)
- Occupation: Businessman; diplomat; film producer

Koo Chen-fu (Chinese: 辜振甫; pinyin: Gū Zhènfǔ; Wade–Giles: Ku Chen-fu; Pe̍h-ōe-jī: Ko͘ Chín-hú, 6 January 1917 – 3 January 2005), also known as C.F. Koo, was a Taiwanese businessman, diplomat, and film producer. He led the Koos Group of companies from 1940 until his death. As a chairman of the Straits Exchange Foundation (SEF), Koo arranged the first direct talks between Taiwan and the People’s Republic of China since 1949 and served as Taiwan's negotiator in both the 1993 and 1998 Wang-Koo summit.

He was also a film producer and produced a number of Taiwanese films between 1973 and 1982, such as Love, Love, Love (1974), Eight Hundred Heroes (1975), Heroes of the Eastern Skies (1977), The Coldest Winter in Peking (1981), and Attack Force Z (1982).

== Early life and education ==
Born in northern Taiwan into a wealthy business family headed by his father Koo Hsien-jung. Koo attended Taihoku Imperial University (now National Taiwan University). He inherited a substantial fortune upon his father’s death in 1937. Koo graduated in 1940 with a Bachelor of Laws (LL.B.) and pursued a graduate degree in Japan at Tokyo Imperial University.

Koo was jailed in 1946 for 19 months on treason charges for helping the Empire of Japan. After his release, he took refuge in Hong Kong and returned to Taiwan in 1949 to marry his wife, Cecilia Koo.

Koo, alongside his nephew Jeffrey Koo Sr., founded the Koos Group during the 20th century. He remained focused on running Koos Group as well as on his political career that led to his elevation to the central committee of Kuomintang.

== Political career ==
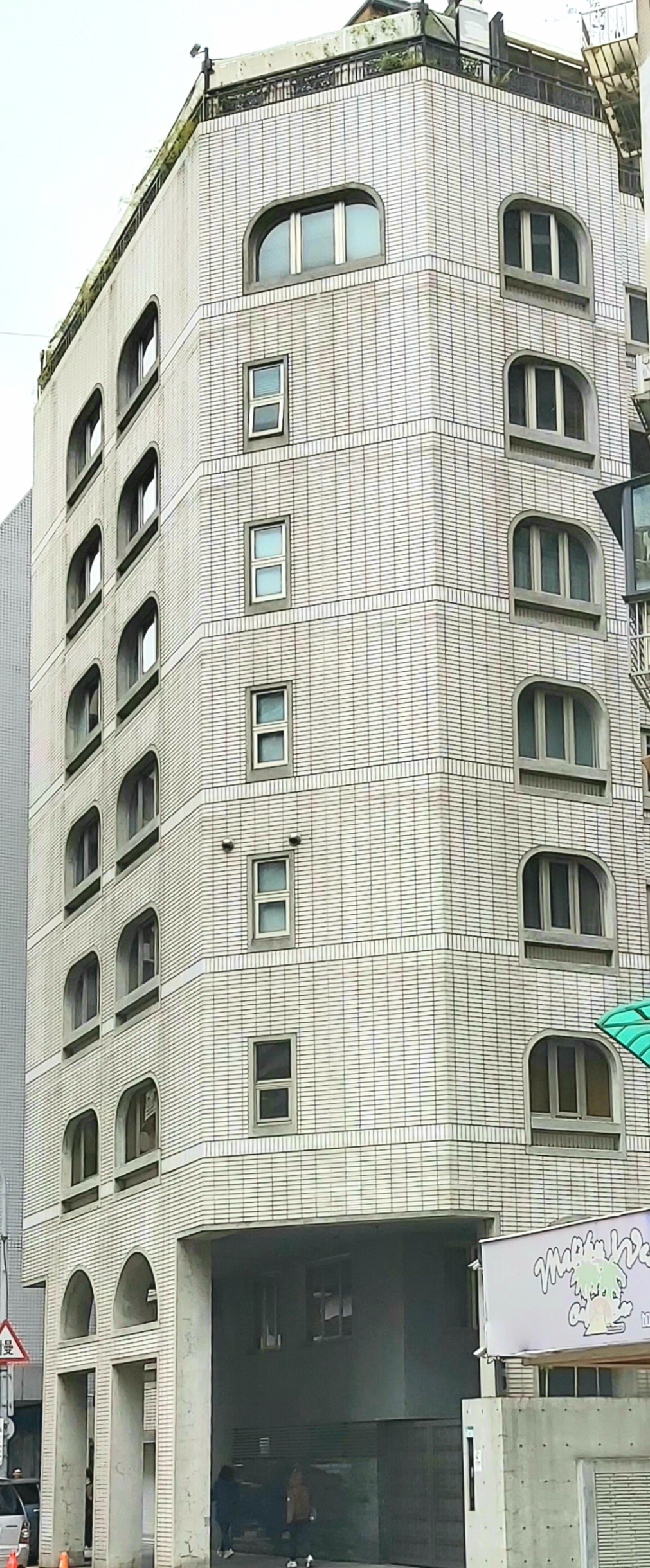
Koo's residence at Zhongshan District, Taipei.

Koo was a member of the Kuomintang (KMT) but had complex political connections. His half-brother, Koo Kwang-ming, was a leading figure in the Taiwan independence movement. Despite this, Koo maintained a strong relationship with the ROC government and served as Presidential Advisor from 1991 until his death in 2005.

== SEF chairmanship ==
Koo was the founding chairman of the Straits Exchange Foundation (SEF). On 16 December 1991, a little over ten months after the establishment of the SEF, the authorities of People's Republic of China (PRC) set up the Association for Relations Across the Taiwan Straits (ARATS), with Wang Daohan as its chairman. The following year Koo and Wang held preliminary talks in Hong Kong that resulted in the disputed 1992 Consensus and facilitated negotiations of practical matters. However, the content and the existence of this "1992 consensus" is widely disputed. In April 1993, Koo and Wang met in Singapore to hold the first formal discussions between Taipei and Beijing since 1949. The two met again in Shanghai in 1998. On 18 October 1998, Koo met Jiang Zemin, General Secretary of the Chinese Communist Party, in Beijing, in what was then the highest-level talks yet held between the two sides. The talks were called off by Beijing in 1999 after ROC President Lee Teng-hui proposed his two-states theory.

== Death ==
Koo Chen-fu died of renal cancer on the morning of 3 January 2005 at the age of 87.

== Legacy ==
The Koo family remains one of Taiwan’s most influential business dynasties. In recognition of his contributions, the National Taiwan University Social Sciences Library was renamed the Koo Chen-Fu Memorial Library.

Political offices
New title	President of the Straits Exchange Foundation; 1990–2005	Succeeded by Chang Chun-hsiung
