= CTBC Financial Park =

Skyscraper office complex in Xinyi, Taipei, Taiwan

CTBC Financial Park 中國信託金融園區

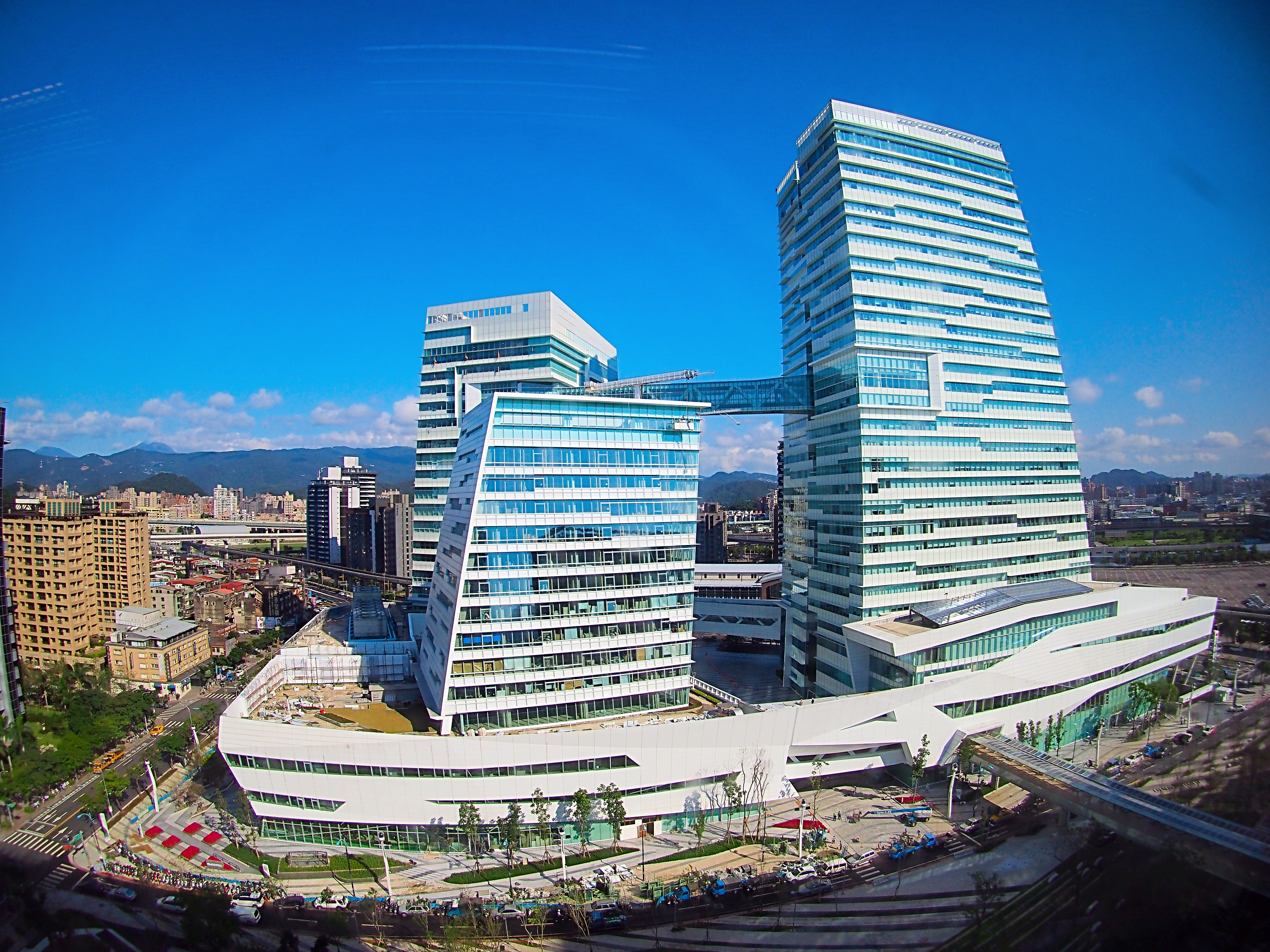
- Interactive map of the CTBC Financial Park 中國信託金融園區 area

General information
- Status: Completed
- Type: Office
- Location: No. 168, Jingmao 2nd Road, Nangang District, Taipei, Taiwan
- Coordinates: 25.059225851206413°N 121.61544451176596°E
- Construction started: 2010
- Completed: 2013

Height
- Architectural: Block A: 139 m (456 ft); Block B: 99.4 m (326 ft); Block C: 66.7 m (219 ft)

Technical details
- Floor count: Block A: 30; Block B: 20; Block C: 14
- Floor area: 266,290 m^{2} (2,866,300 sq ft)

Design and construction
- Architects: NBBJ + Fei & Cheng Associates

Website
- https://www.ctbcfinancialpark.com

The CTBC Financial Park, or Chinatrust Commercial Bank Headquarters (Chinese: 中國信託金融園區), is a skyscraper office complex located in Nangang District, Taipei, Taiwan. Construction of the complex began in 2010 and it was completed in 2013. The complex consists of three towers with a total floor area of 266,290 m^{2} (2,866,300 sq ft). The height of Block A is 139 m (456 ft), and it comprises 30 floors above ground, as well as five basement levels. The height of Block B is 99.4 m (326 ft), and it comprises 20 floors above ground, as well as five basement levels. The height of Block C is 66.7 m (219 ft), and it comprises 14 floors above ground, as well as five basement levels. It houses the headquarters of CTBC Financial Holding and is situated in close proximity to Nangang Software Park and Taipei Nangang Exhibition Center.

== Design ==
The building was designed jointly by the American architectural team NBBJ and the Taiwanese team Fei & Cheng Associates. The design adopts the concept of traditional Taiwanese residential courtyard buildings to modern high-rise buildings that combines tradition and modernity, and expresses three buildings connected by air bridges in a shape like the Chinese character for "mountain" (Chinese: 山). To save energy and electricity, a total of 695 m^{2} (7,480 sq ft) of solar panels were installed on the top floor of Tower A to illuminate public spaces. LED lights are used in the office space, lighting and air conditioning can be switched on and off in small areas, and electronic ballasts are planned to save electricity expenditure. The elevator power interruption adopts the emergency power supply automatic switching operation function. The water facilities in the building, including fountains and sprinklers around the park, all adopt rainwater recovery equipment, recycling systems and water-saving equipment. To cope with extreme weather, a detention pond with a water storage capacity of 2,000 tonnes is installed in the basement of the headquarters to effectively avoid flooding in case of heavy rain. The complex received the MIPIM Asia 2015 Silver Award for Best Mixed-Use Development.

== Gallery ==
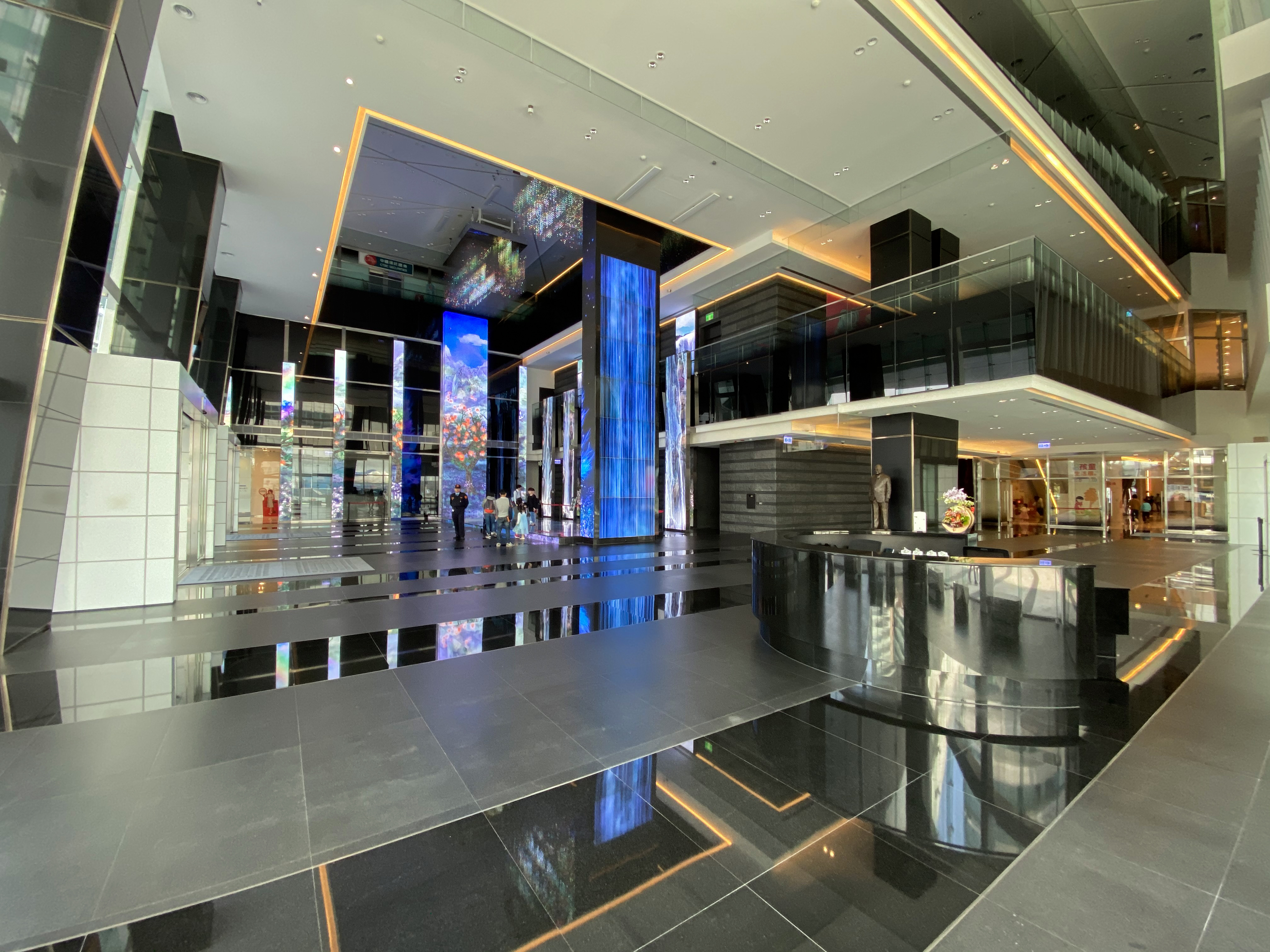
Block A Lobby

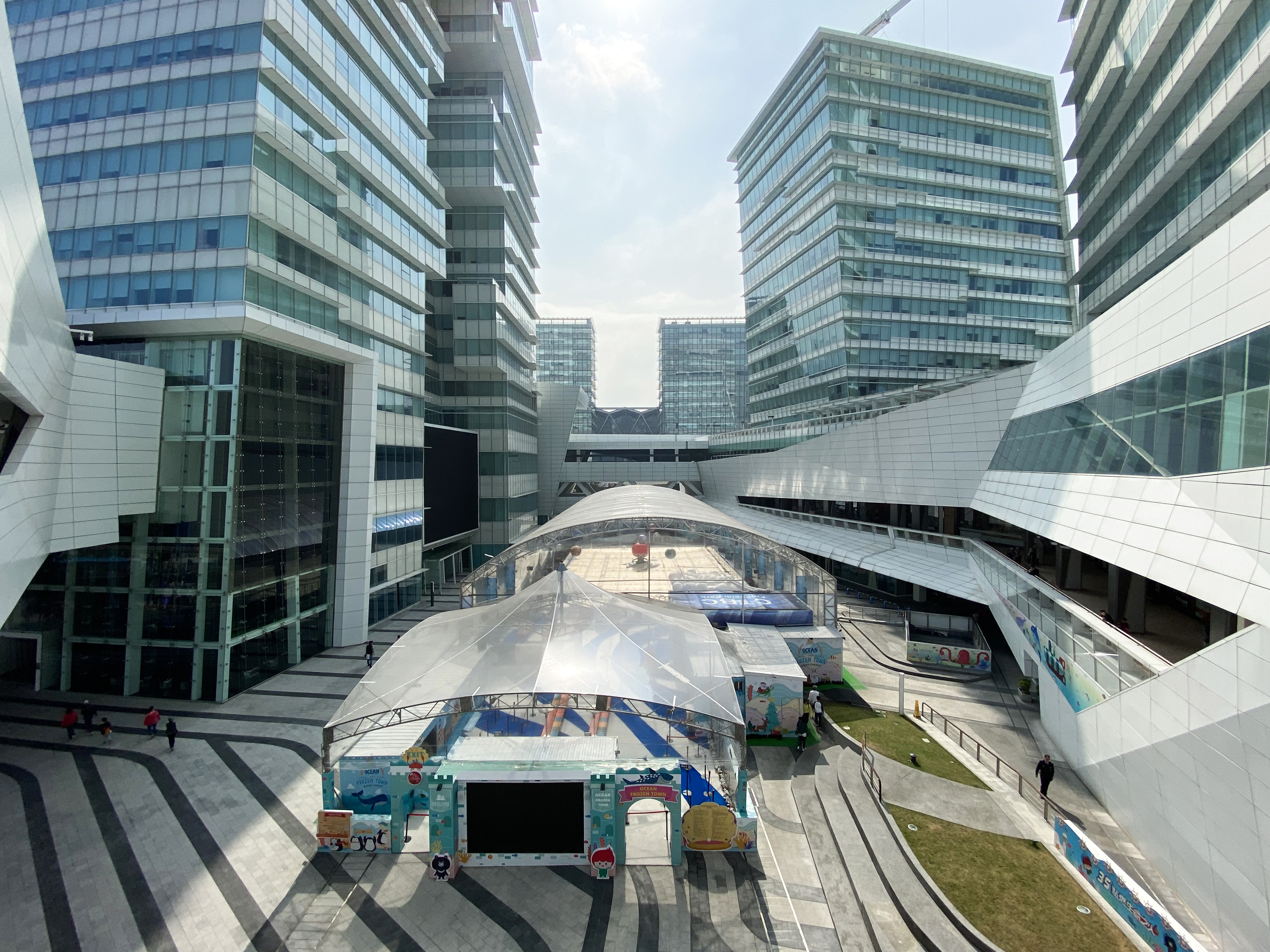
Public Space

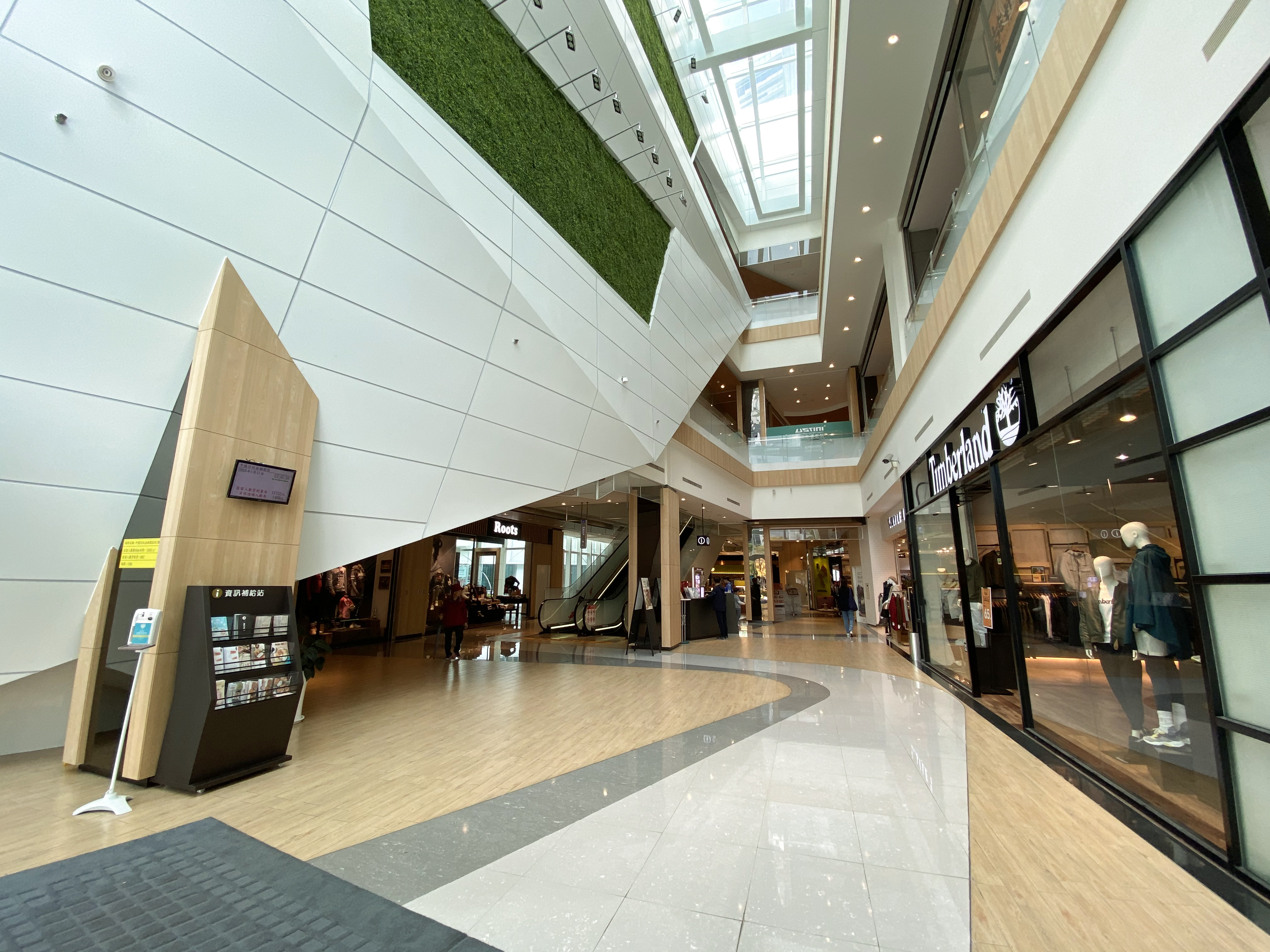
Block C Mall

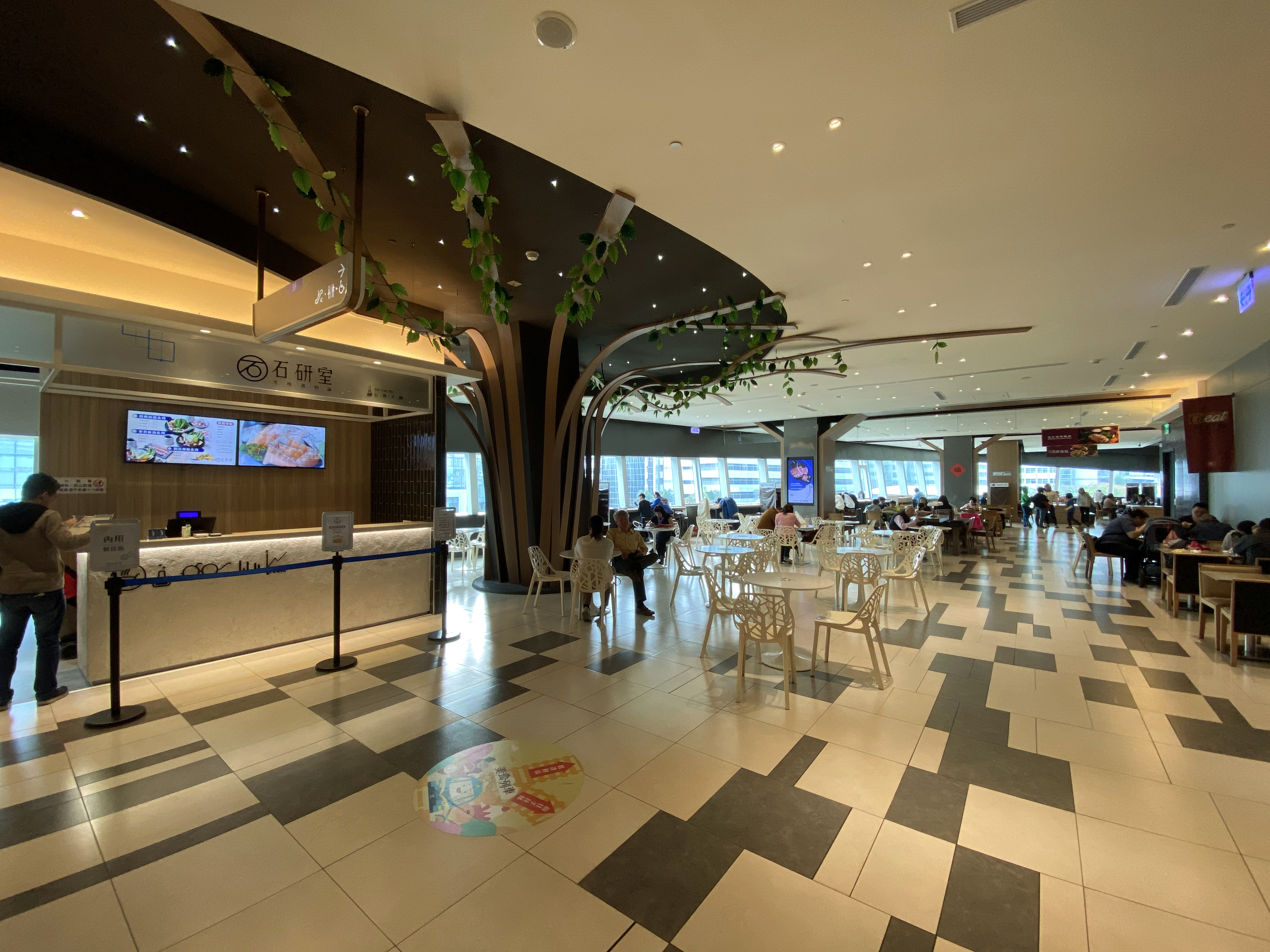
Level 3 Food Court

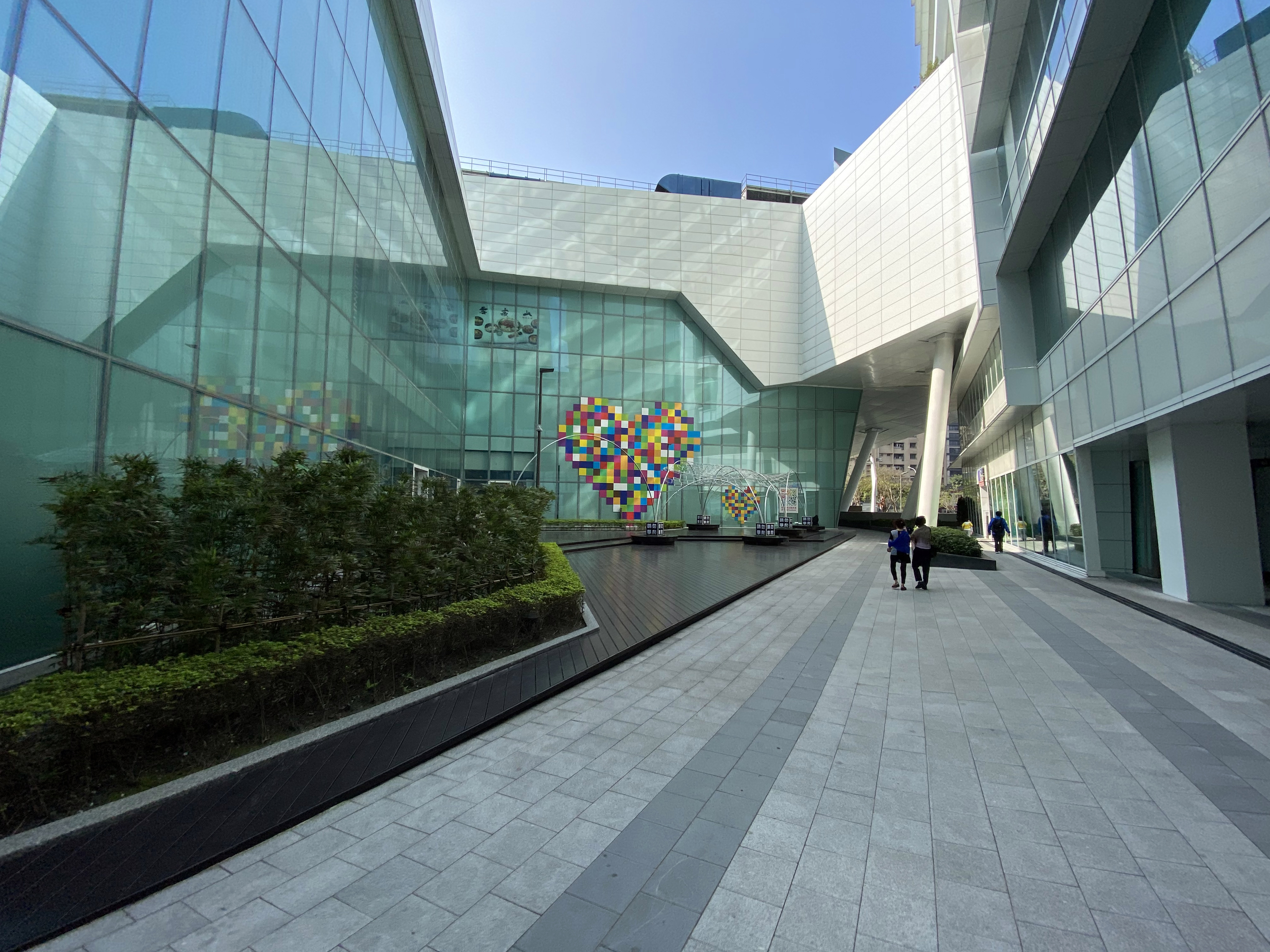
Outdoor garden

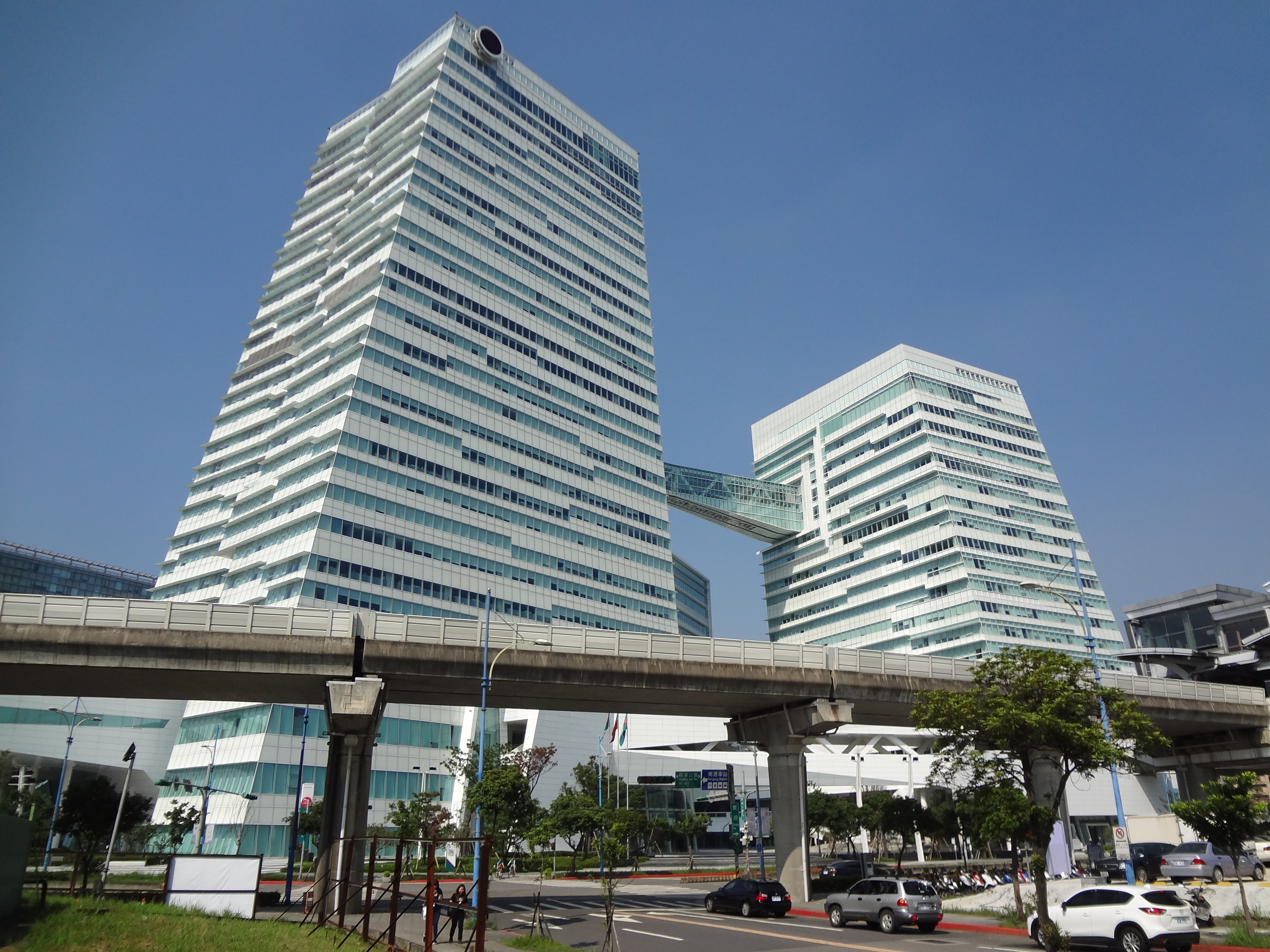

== See also ==
- List of tallest buildings in Taiwan
- List of tallest buildings in Taipei
- CTBC Taichung Headquarters
- CTBC Financial Holding
