= CTBC Financial Holding =

Taiwanese Financial Holding

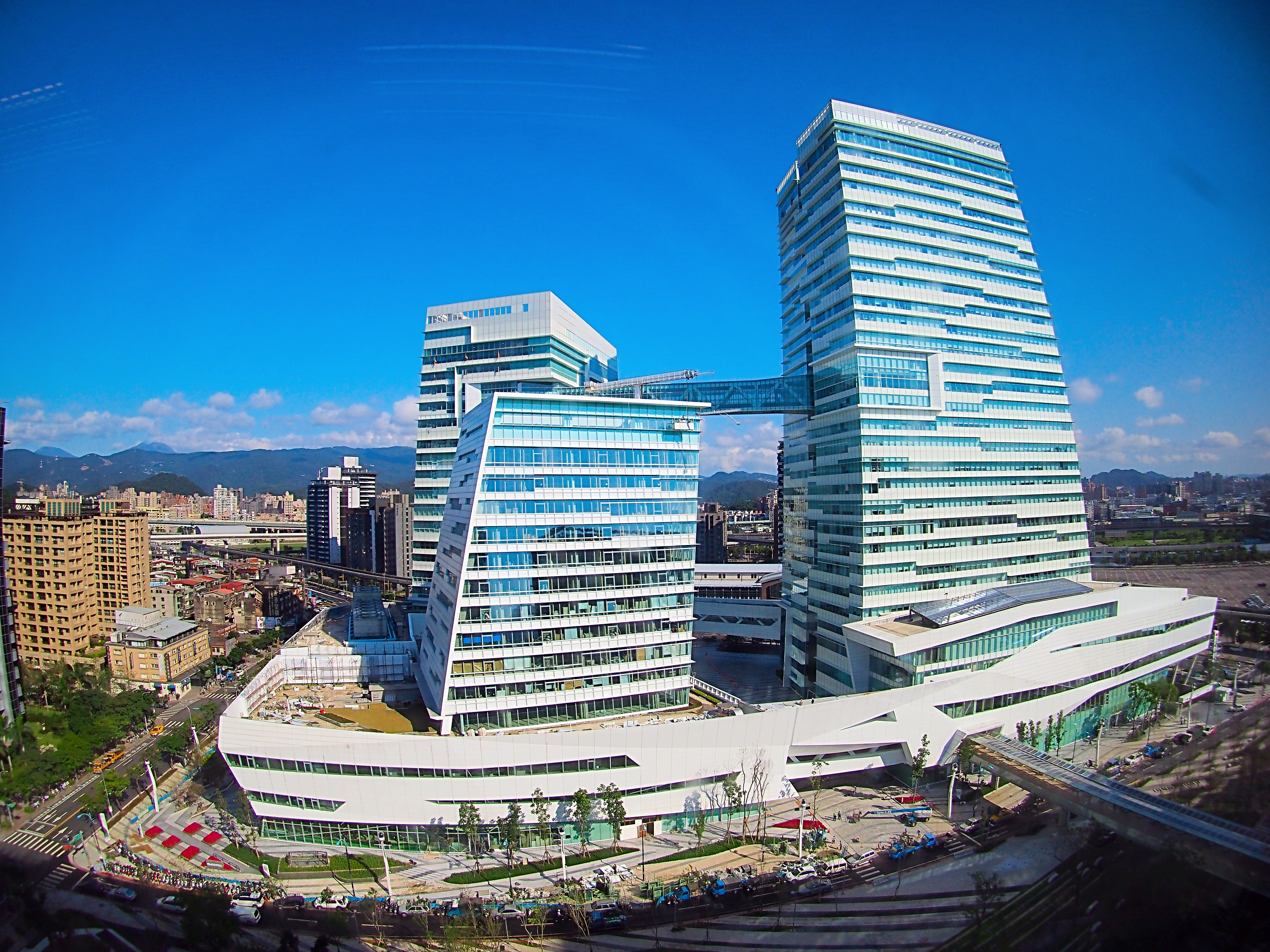
CTBC Financial Park

CTBC Financial Holding Co., Ltd. (Former: ChinaTrust Financial Holding Company Ltd., Chinese: 中國信託金融控股) founded by Jeffrey Koo Sr., the third-generation of the Koo Family. Originally under the Koos Group, CTBC Financial Holding is a holding company principally engaged in the finance industry through its eight major subsidiaries. As of 2024, the company reported total assets of $270 billion.

The holding company is based in CTBC Financial Park, Taipei, Taiwan. Today, the company is majority owned and chaired by Jeffrey Koo Jr. alongside the Koo Family.

== Services ==
The company's products and services are classified into eight categories: banking, including corporate banking, consumer finance and retail banking; securities, including securities brokerage, trading and underwriting services, as well as the securities-related futures business; bill and bond, including brokerage, trading, underwriting, certification, guarantee and advisory services; insurance brokerage, providing property and life insurance services; venture capital, focusing on the high technology industries, such as telecommunications semiconductor industries; asset management, including the acquisition, management and processing of financial debts from financial institutions; security services, such as stationing of security guards in office buildings, and lottery, including issuance, marketing, promotion, prize drawing, prize claiming, and management.

== Subsidiaries ==
- CTBC Bank (formerly Chinatrust Commercial Bank)
- Taiwan Life Insurance
- CTBC Securities Co.
- CTBC Investments
- CTBC Venture Capital Co.
- CTBC Asset Management Co.
- CTBC Finance Co.
- CTBC Security Co.
- Taiwan Lottery Corporation (台灣彩券)

== See also ==
- List of companies of Taiwan
- CTBC University of Technology
- CTBC Business School
- CTBC Brothers
- New Taipei CTBC DEA
- CTBC Flying Oyster
