= Compaq Portable series =

Laptop manufacturer

The Compaq logo as used on the first Compaq portables

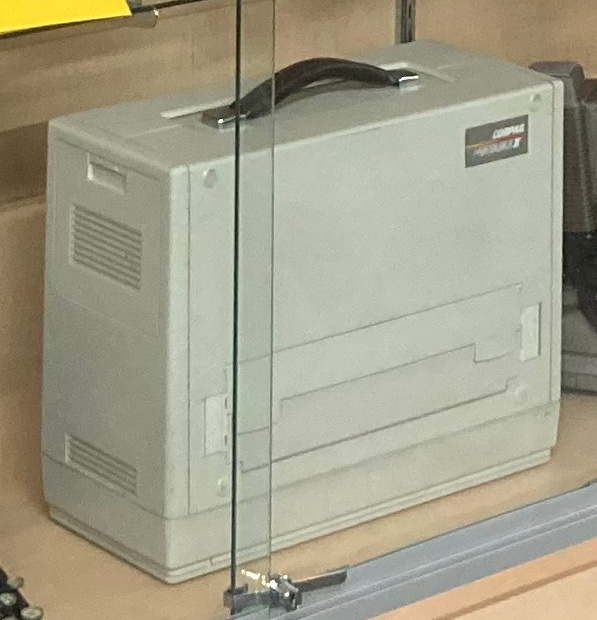
Compaq Portable II

The Compaq Portable series was a series of portable computers that comprised Compaq Computer Corporation's first products. Initial entries in the series sported the "luggable" form factor; late entries were smaller and were termed "lunchbox computers". These computers measured approximately 16 inches (410 mm) deep, 8 inches (200 mm) tall, and approximately 20 inches (510 mm) wide. As the products evolved, laptops and notebooks were created offering a new level of portability that caused the market to explode.

Some of the portables, such as the original Portable and the Portable II, had CRT monitors, while later the Portable III and the Portable 386) had flat, monochrome, usually amber, plasma displays. The portables came/could come with internal hard disk drives on 0.5" shock mount springs; diskette drives, usually 5-1/4" double- or quadruple-density drives; batteries; and/or a dual-ISA expansion chassis, about one full-drive-height wide. Note this was before the term "ISA" became a standard. The Compaq Portable 486 included mono and color LCD screens and were battery powered.

== Machines of the series ==
- Compaq Portable – Compaq's first computer; first 100% IBM PC compatible
  - Compaq Portable Plus – Compaq's version with built-in hard drive
  - Compaq Portable 286 – Compaq's version of the PC AT in the original Compaq Portable chassis; equipped with 6/8-MHz 286 and a high-speed 20-MB hard drive
- Compaq Portable II – smaller and lighter version of Compaq Portable 286; it was less expensive but with limited upgradability and a slower hard drive
- Compaq Portable III
  - Compaq Portable 386
- Compaq Portable 486 and Compaq Portable 486c

The Compaq Portable is an early portable computer which was one of the first 100% IBM PC compatible systems. It was Compaq Computer Corporation's first product, to be followed by others in the Compaq Portable series and later Compaq Deskpro series.

== Initial Production and Competition ==
The Compaq Portable was announced in November 1982 and first shipped in March 1983, priced at US$2,995 (equivalent to $9,700 in 2025) with a single half-height 5¼" 360 kB diskette drive or $3,590 for dual, full-height diskette drives. The 28 lb (13 kg) Compaq Portable folded up into a luggable case the size of a portable sewing machine. Compaq sold 53,000 units in the first year with a total of $111 million in revenue, an American Business record. In the second year revenue hit $329 million setting an industry record. Third year revenue was at $503.9 million, another US business record.

The computer was an early all-in-one, becoming available two years after the CP/M-based Osborne 1, one year after the Kaypro II, in the same year as the 8088 and MS-DOS-based (but not entirely IBM PC compatible) Dynalogic Hyperion, and a year before the Commodore SX-64. Its design was influenced by that of the Xerox NoteTaker, a prototype computer developed at Xerox PARC in 1976. Other portable "work-alikes", that were not PC compatible clones include the Seequa Chameleon, and Corona Data Systems' Model PPC-400, and Eagle Computer's Eagle Spirit Portable. They were all short-lived competitors.

IBM responded to the Compaq Portable with the IBM Portable PC, developed because its sales force needed a comparable computer to sell against Compaq.

== Design ==
The Compaq Portable has basically the same off-the-shelf hardware as an IBM PC, transplanted into a luggable case (specifically designed to fit as carry-on luggage on an airplane), with Compaq's BIOS instead of IBM's. All Portables shipped with 128k of RAM and 1-2 double-sided double-density 360 KB disk drives.

The machine's video card is a unique hybrid of the IBM MDA and CGA which supports the latter's graphics modes but contains both cards' text fonts in ROM. In text mode, the 9x14 font is used, and the 8x8 font is used in the graphics mode. (The user switches between the modes by pressing Ctrl+Alt+>.) The user can use both IBM video standards, for graphics capabilities and high-resolution text. In graphics mode the card can output to both the internal and an external display, but the text mode only works with the internal display. The same graphics hardware is also used in the original Compaq Deskpro desktop computer.

The internal CRT monitor has a low refresh rate and exhibits heavy ghosting; this was not a Compaq choice but a consequence of replicating the IBM MDA design, which uses a 50 Hz refresh rate and a long-persistence P39 green phosphor CRT (in the IBM 5151 video display). IBM chose this design to provide high vertical resolution—for sharp text—with low flicker for low eye strain over long (all-workday) periods of use.

Compaq used a “foam and foil” keyboard from Keytronics, with contact mylar pads that were also featured in the Tandy TRS-80, Apple Lisa 1 and 2, Compaq Deskpro 286 AT, some mainframe terminals, SUN Type 4, and some Wang keyboards. The foam pads the keyboards used to make contact with the circuit board when pressed disintegrate over time, due to both the wear of normal use and aging degradation.

== Software ==
Compaq's efforts were possible because IBM had used mostly off-the-shelf parts for the PC and published full technical documentation for it, and because Microsoft had kept the right to license MS-DOS to other computer manufacturers. The main difficulty was the BIOS, because it contained IBM's copyrighted code. Compaq solved this problem by producing a clean room workalike that performed all documented functions of the IBM PC BIOS, but was completely written from scratch.

Although numerous other companies soon also began selling PC compatibles, few matched Compaq's achievement of essentially-complete software compatibility with the IBM PC (typically reaching "95% compatibility" at best).Then Phoenix Technologies and others began selling similarly reverse-engineered BIOSs on the open market.

The first Portables used MS-DOS essentially identical to PC DOS 1.10 except for having a standalone BASIC that did not require the IBM PC's ROM Cassette BASIC, but this was superseded in a few months by MS-DOS 2.00 which added hard disk support and other advanced features. The initial Portables are similar to the 16K-64K models of the IBM PC in that the BIOS was limited to 544K of RAM and did not support expansion ROMs, thus making them unable to use EGA/VGA cards, hard disks, or similar hardware. After DOS 2.x and the IBM XT came out, Compaq upgraded the BIOS. Although the Portable was not offered with a factory hard disk, users commonly installed them. Starting in 1984, Compaq began offering a hard-disk equipped version in the Portable Plus. The original hard disks offered would be 10 or 21 megabytes, although bad sectors often reduced the space available for use.

== Reception ==
BYTE wrote, after testing a prototype, that the Compaq Portable "looks like a sure winner" because of its portability, cost, and high degree of compatibility with the IBM PC. Its reviewer tested IBM PC DOS, CP/M-86, WordStar, SuperCalc, and several other software packages, and found that all worked except one game. PC Magazine also rated the Compaq Portable very highly for compatibility, reporting that all tested applications ran. It praised the "rugged" hardware design and sharp display, and concluded that it was "certainly worth consideration by anyone seeking to run IBM PC software without an IBM PC".

== Later Models ==
The Compaq Portable Plus simply had a hard drive to replace one floppy disk drive, and logos and badges with gold backgrounds instead of silver. Independent computer stores were previously doing this upon request of users, and Compaq saw this as a lost revenue opportunity. In 1985, Compaq introduced the Portable 286, although it was replaced by the more compact Portable II in a redesigned case within a few months. The Portable 286 featured a full height hard disk, and the options of one half-height floppy drive, two half-height floppy drives, or a half-height floppy drive and a tape backup drive The Compaq Portable 286, Compaq's version of the PC AT was offered in the original Compaq Portable chassis; equipped with 6/8 MHz 286 and a high-speed 20 MB hard drive The Compaq Portable II – was smaller and lighter version of Compaq Portable 286; it was less expensive but with limited upgradability and a slower hard drive.

The Compaq Portable III was another AT-compatible computer released in 1987. It was advertised as being much smaller and lighter than the previous portable x86-PCs, however it was still quite large by today's standards. Three models were announced at release. The Model 1 had a list price of US$3,999 and was equipped with a 12 MHz Intel 80286, 640 KB RAM, 1.2 MB 5.25″ floppy, and a 10″ amber colored gas-plasma display. Other options included the Model 20 at US$4,999 which added a 20 MB hard disk, or US$5,799 for the Model 40 with the upgraded 40 MB hard disk. There was also an optional ISA Expansion chassis allowed for 2 full length 16-bit ISA add-in cards for US$199. Power is supplied using a mains electricity outlet, no battery exists.

The Compaq Portable III, Compaq Portable 386, Compaq Portable 486 and Compaq Portable 486c were later in the series.

== See also ==
- Compaq SLT laptop series
- Compaq LTE notebook series - initially co-developed with Citizen Watch Company
- Compaq Contura value notebook series
- Compaq Contura Aero subnotebook series
- Compaq Aero handheld series
- Compaq Concerto pen table convertible
