= Compaq Portable =

Early portable computer

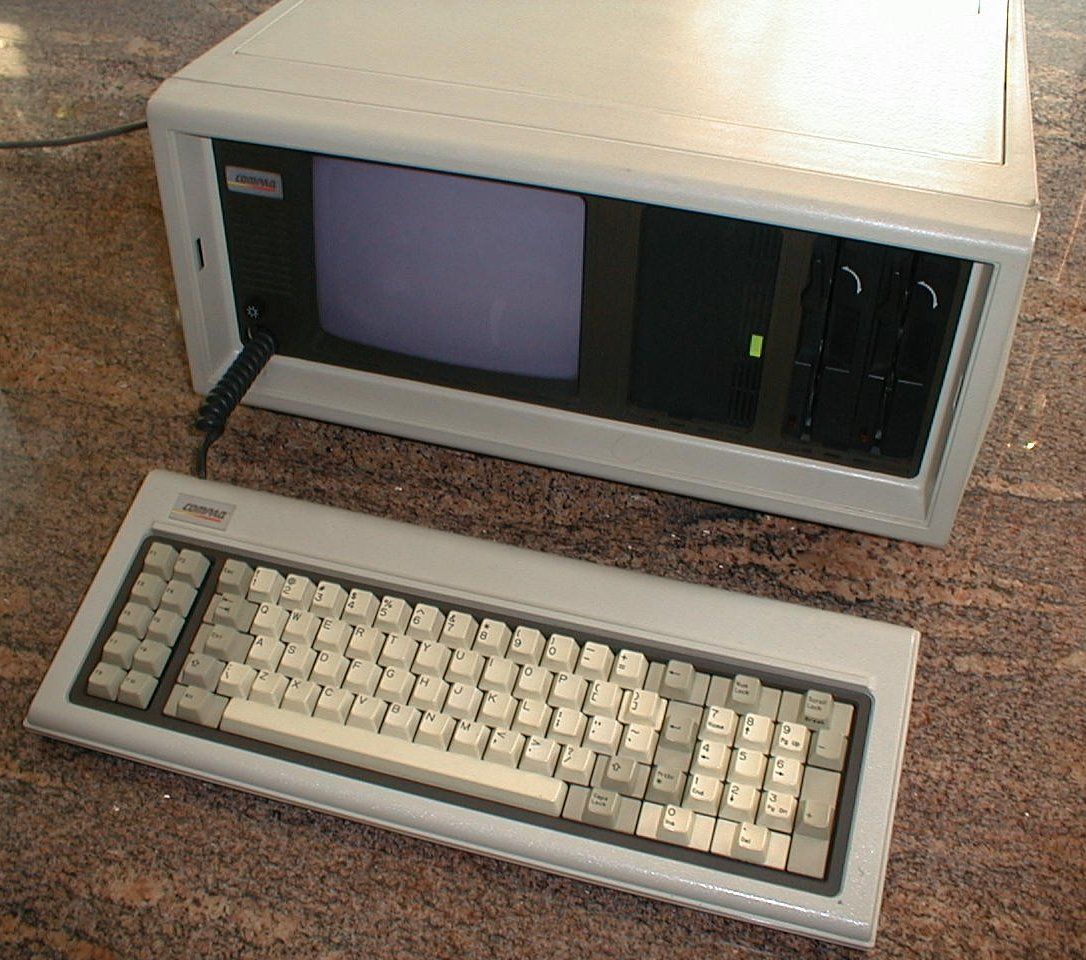
- A Compaq Portable with the keyboard detached ready for use. This machine has an aftermarket hard disk and floppy disk drives added.
- Manufacturer: Compaq Computer Corporation
- Product family: Compaq Portable series
- Type: Portable computer
- Released: March 1983; 43 years ago
- Introductory price: US$2,995 (equivalent to $9,680 in 2025)
- Operating system: MS-DOS
- CPU: Intel 8088, 4.77 MHz
- Memory: 128 KB (expandable to 640 KB)
- Storage: Two 5.25" floppy disk drives or, optionally, one floppy drive and a 10 MB hard drive
- Display: Built-in 9" green screen monitor
- Graphics: Unique CGA-compatible video card
- Weight: 28 lb (13 kg)
- Backward compatibility: IBM PC compatible
- Successor: Compaq Portable Plus; Compaq Portable 286; Compaq Portable II

The Compaq Portable is an early portable computer which was one of the first IBM PC–compatible systems. It was Compaq Computer Corporation's first product, to be followed by others in the Compaq Portable series and later Deskpro series. It is not simply an 8088-CPU computer that runs a Microsoft DOS as a PC "work-alike", but contains a reverse-engineered BIOS and Compaq DOS compatible with IBM's PC DOS. The computer is also an early variation on the idea of an "all-in-one".

The Compaq Portable was announced in November 1982 and first shipped in March 1983. It became available two years after the similar, but CP/M-based, Osborne 1 and Kaypro II. Columbia Data Products' MPC 1600 "Multi Personal Computer", the first IBM PC compatible system, had come out in June 1982.

== Production and sales ==
The Compaq Portable was announced in November 1982 and first shipped in March 1983, priced at US$2,995 (equivalent to $9,700 in 2025) with a single half-height 5 1/4" 360 KB diskette drive or US$3,590 for dual, full-height diskette drives. The 28 lb (13 kg) Compaq Portable folds up into a luggable case the size of a portable sewing machine.

IBM responded to the Compaq Portable with the IBM Portable PC, developed because its sales force needed a comparable computer to sell against Compaq.

Compaq sold 53,000 units in the first year with a total of US$111 million in revenue, an American Business record. In the second year revenue hit US$329 million setting an industry record. Third year revenue was at US$503.9 million, another US business record.

== Design ==
The Compaq Portable has basically the same hardware as an IBM PC, with Compaq's BIOS instead of IBM's, transplanted into a luggable case specifically designed to fit as carry-on luggage on an airplane. (An engineer said that the Portable fits under an airplane seat if no one too heavy sat above it.) All Portables shipped with 128KB of RAM and 1-2 double-sided double-density 360 KB disk drives. Like the non-portable IBM PC, the Compaq Portable runs on power from an AC outlet only; it has no battery.

The machine's video card is a hybrid of the IBM MDA and CGA which supports the latter's graphics modes, but uses the former's high-quality character set in 80x25 text mode. (When Mitch Kapor saw the Portable use both standards while demonstrating Lotus 1-2-3 to Sears Business Centers, he stopped the presentation to explain his amazement at Compaq's achievement.) In text mode the 9×14 font is used, and the 8×8 one is used in the graphics mode (the user switches between the modes by pressing Ctrl+Alt+>). In graphics mode the card can output to both the internal and an external display, but the text mode only works with the internal display. The graphics hardware is also used in the original Compaq Deskpro desktop computer.

Compaq used a "foam and foil" keyboard from Keytronics. The foam pads the keyboards use to make contact with the circuit board when pressed disintegrate over time, due to both the wear of normal use and natural wear. The CRT display also suffers from a low refresh rate and heavy ghosting.

Various views
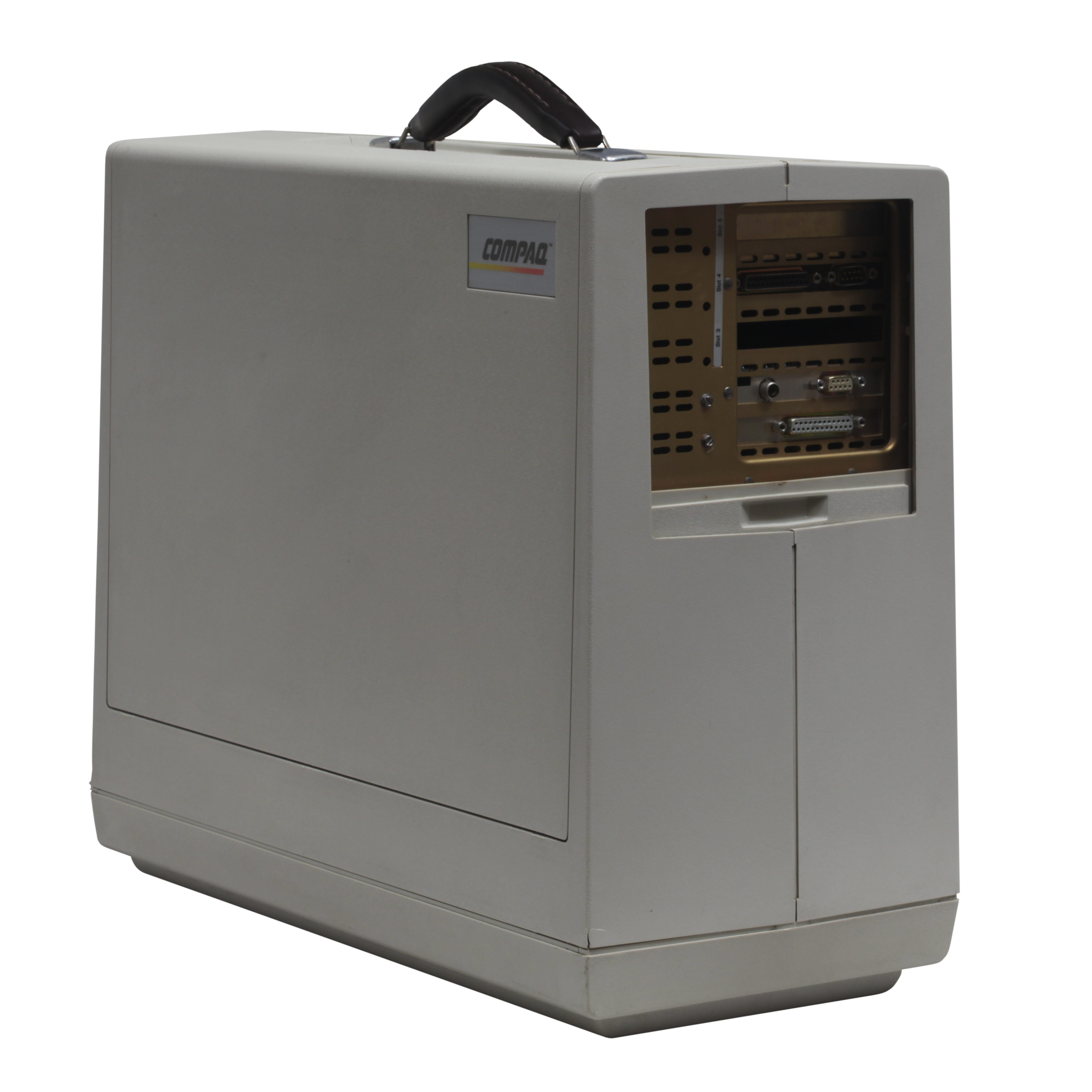
Front of the suitcase, with connectors for parallel and CGA port

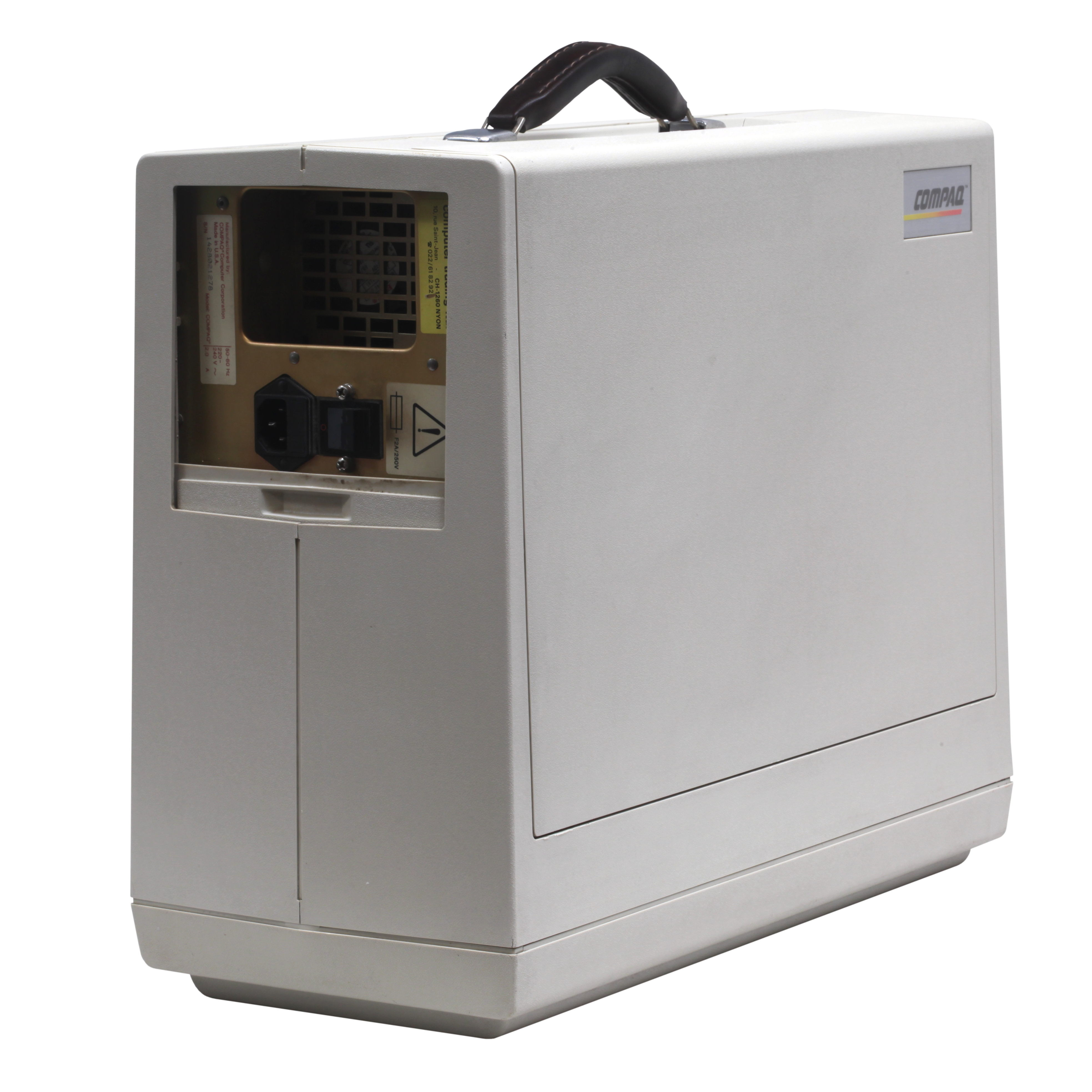
Rear of the suitcase, with AC power input

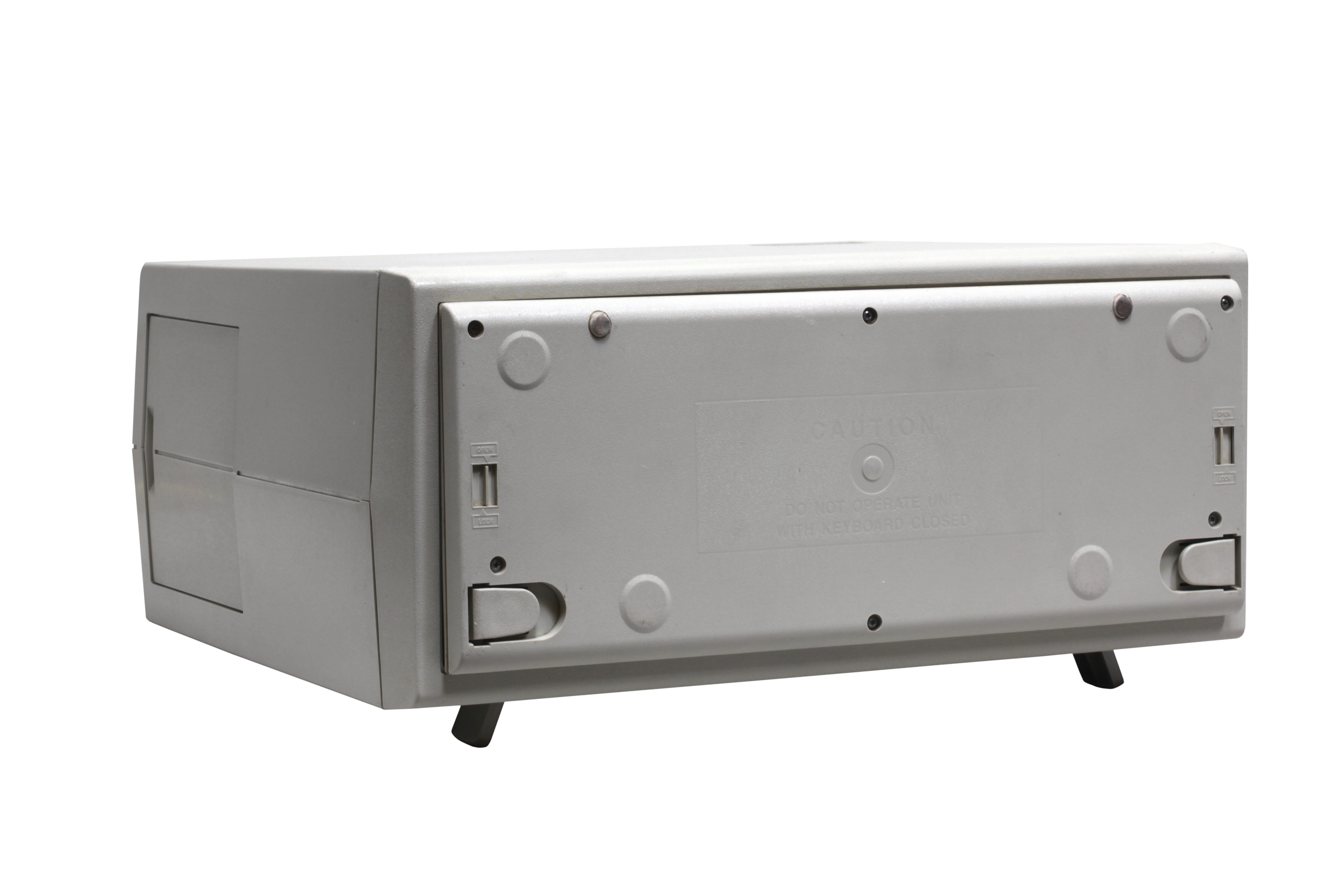
Bottom of the suitcase with removable keyboard; stand is deployed

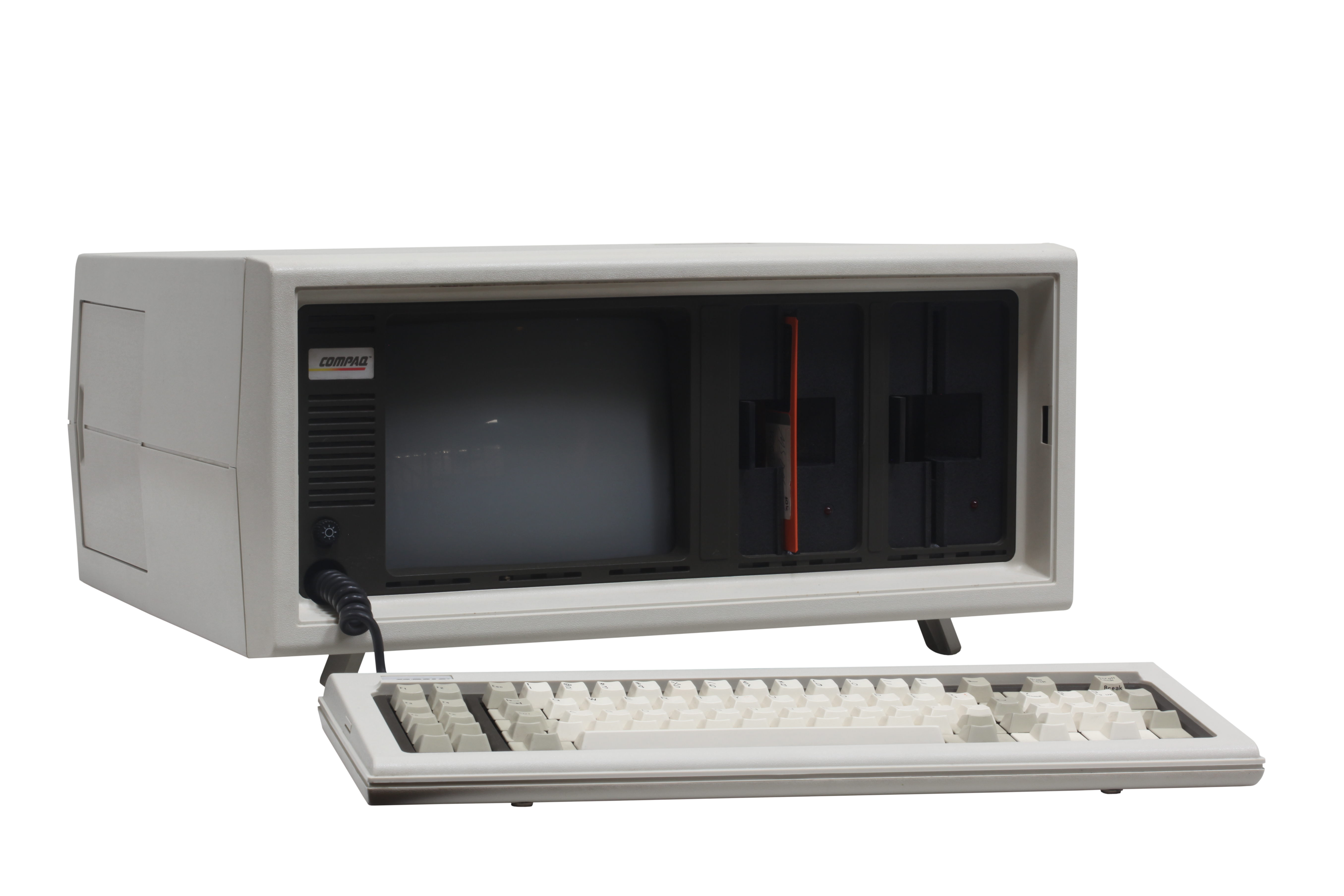
Keyboard removed, computer ready for use

=== Software ===
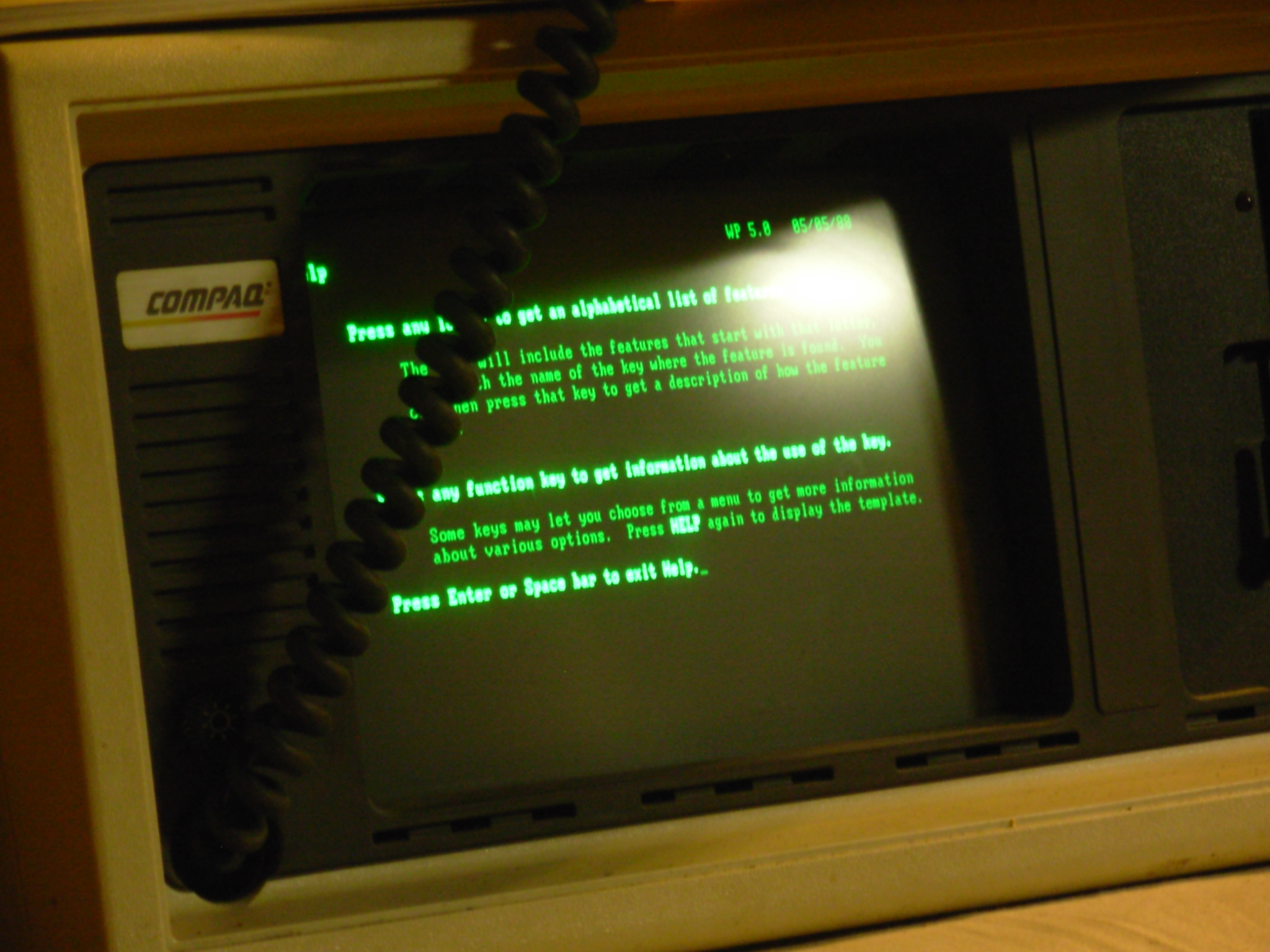
Running WordPerfect 5.0

Compaq's efforts were possible because IBM had used mostly off-the-shelf parts for the PC and published full technical documentation for it, and because Microsoft had kept the right to license MS-DOS to other computer manufacturers. The only difficulty was the BIOS, because it contained IBM's copyrighted code. Compaq solved this problem by producing a clean room workalike that performs all documented functions of the IBM PC BIOS, but was completely written from scratch.

Although numerous other companies soon also began selling PC compatibles, few matched Compaq's achievement of essentially-complete software compatibility with the IBM PC (typically reaching "95% compatibility" at best) until Phoenix Technologies and others began selling similarly reverse-engineered BIOSs on the open market.

Compaq shipped the Portable with Compaq DOS, its own version of MS-DOS. The first Portables use version 1.10, essentially identical to PC DOS 1.10 except for having a standalone BASIC that did not require the IBM PC's ROM Cassette BASIC, but this was superseded in a few months by DOS 2.00 which added hard disk support and other advanced features.

Aside from using DOS 1.x, the initial Portables are similar to the 16 KB – 64 KB models of the IBM PC in that the BIOS was limited to 544 KB of RAM and did not support expansion ROMs, thus making them unable to use EGA/VGA cards, hard disks, or similar hardware. After DOS 2.x and the IBM XT came out, Compaq upgraded the BIOS. Although the Portable was not offered with a factory hard disk, users commonly installed them. Starting in 1984, Compaq began offering a hard disk-equipped version, the Portable Plus, which also featured a single half-height floppy drive. The hard disk offered would be 10 to 21 megabytes, although bad sectors often reduced the space available for use.

In 1985, Compaq introduced the Portable 286, but it was replaced by the more compact Portable II in a redesigned case within a few months. The Portable 286 featured a full-height hard disk, and the options of one half-height floppy drive, two half-height floppy drives, or a half-height floppy drive and a tape backup drive.

== Competitors ==
Other IBM PC "work-alikes" included the MS-DOS and 8088-based, but not entirely IBM PC software compatible, Dynalogic Hyperion, Eagle Computer's Eagle 1600 series, including the Eagle Spirit portable, and the Corona personal computer. The latter two companies were threatened by IBM for BIOS copyright infringement, and settled out of court, agreeing to re-implement their BIOS.

There was also the Seequa Chameleon, which had both 8088 and Z80 CPUs to alternately run MS-DOS or CP/M. Unlike Compaq, many of these companies had previously released computers based on Zilog's Z80 and Digital Research's CP/M operating system. Like Compaq, they recognized the replicability of the IBM PC's off-the-shelf parts, and saw that Microsoft retained the right to license MS-DOS to other companies. Only Compaq was able to fully capitalize on this, by aiming for complete IBM PC and PC DOS software compatibility, while reverse-engineering the BIOS to head off copyright legal claims.

Other contemporary systems include the portable Commodore SX-64, also known as the Executive 64, or VIP-64 in Europe, a briefcase/suitcase-size "luggable" version of the popular Commodore 64 home computer built with an 8-bit MOS 6510 (6502-based) CPU microprocessor, and the first full-color portable computer. Like the Z80 and "work-alike" portables, its sales fell into insignificance in the face of the Compaq Portable series.

== Reception ==
BYTE wrote, after testing a prototype, that the Compaq Portable "looks like a sure winner" because of its portability, cost, and high degree of compatibility with the IBM PC. Its reviewer tested IBM PC DOS, CP/M-86, WordStar, SuperCalc, and several other software packages, and found that all worked except one game. "Compaq", InfoWorld said, "deserves the success it enjoys ... an excellent, convenient machine designed and priced for professional use". PC Magazine also rated the Compaq Portable very highly for compatibility, reporting that all tested applications ran. It praised the "rugged" hardware design and sharp display, and concluded that it was "certainly worth consideration by anyone seeking to run IBM PC software without an IBM PC".

== Successors ==
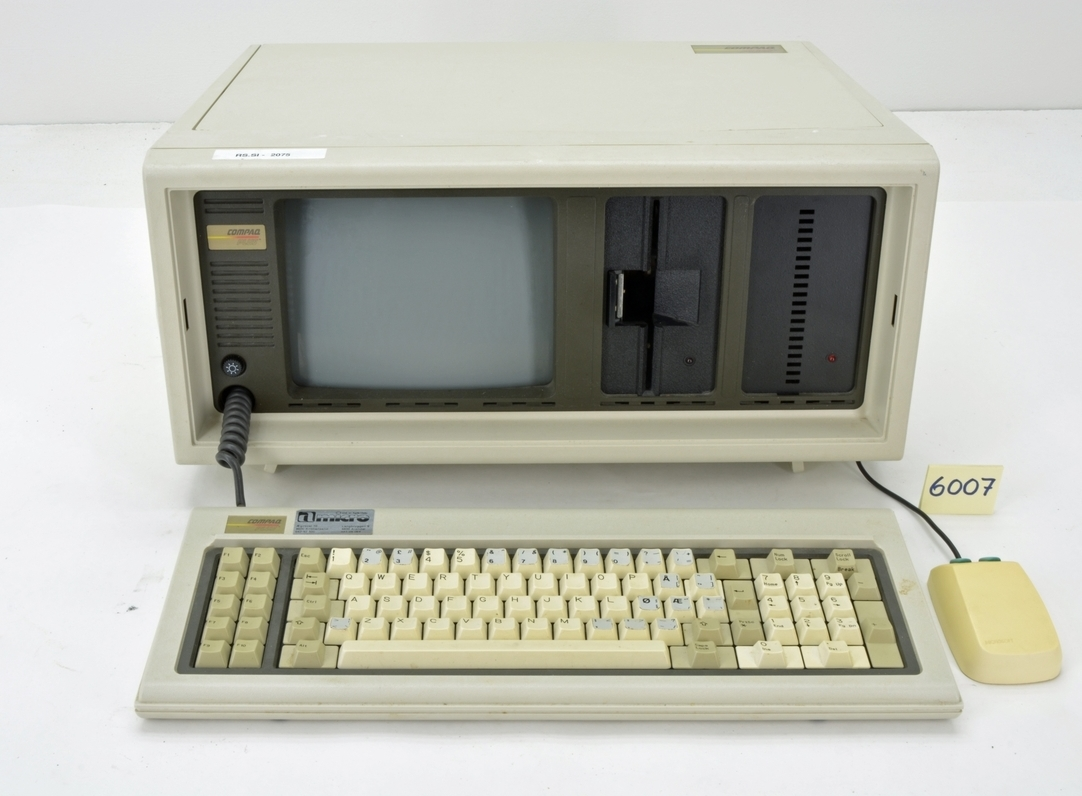
Compaq Portable Plus

=== Upgrades ===
==== Compaq Portable Plus ====
Released in 1983 upgraded version; The Compaq Portable Plus simply had a hard drive to replace one floppy disk drive, and logos and badges with gold backgrounds instead of silver. Independent computer stores were previously doing this upon request of users, and Compaq saw this as a lost revenue opportunity.

==== Compaq Portable 286 ====
The Compaq Portable 286, Compaq's version of the PC AT, was offered in the original Compaq Portable chassis; it was equipped with a 6/8 MHz 286 and a high-speed 20 MB hard drive.

=== Compaq Portable series ===
The Compaq Portable machine was the first of a series of Compaq Portable machines. The Compaq Portable II was a smaller and lighter version of Compaq Portable 286; it was less expensive but with limited upgradability and a slower hard drive, The Compaq Portable III, Compaq Portable 386, Compaq Portable 486 and Compaq Portable 486c were later in the series.
