= Columbia Data Products =

American computer tech company

Columbia Data Products, Inc.
- Logo used since 2013
- Type: Private
- Industry: Data security
- Founded: 1976; 50 years ago
- Founder: William Diaz
- Headquarters: Altamonte Springs, Florida, United States
- Website: www.cdpi.com

Columbia Data Products, Inc. (CDP) is a company which produced the first legally reverse-engineered IBM PC clones, starting with the MPC 1600 series in 1982. It faltered in that market after only a few years, and later reinvented itself as a software development company.

== History ==
=== 1976–1986: As a hardware company ===
First logo of Columbia Data Products

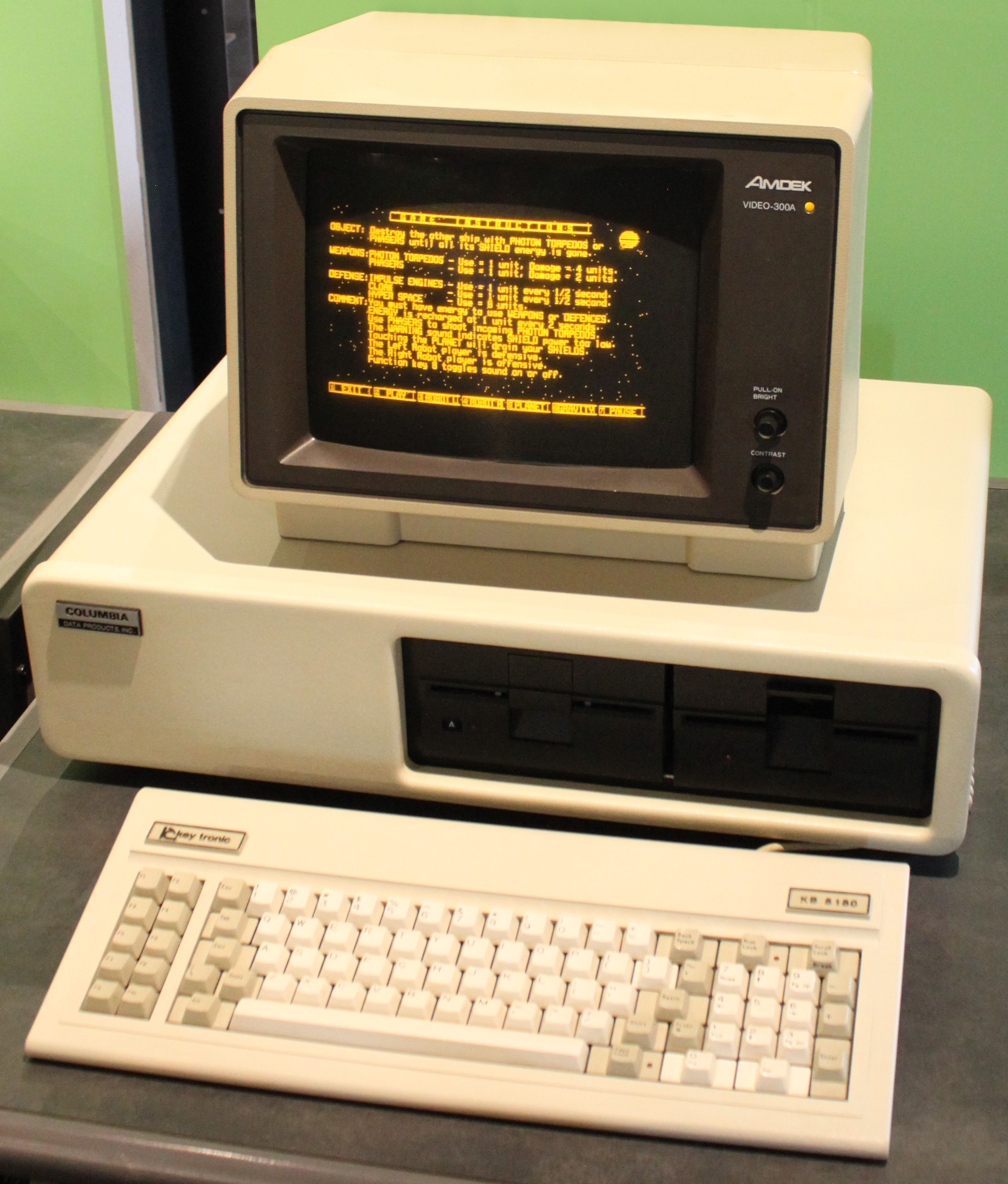
CDP's MPC 1600 (pictured) from 1982 was the first commercially released IBM PC clone.

Columbia Data Products was founded by William Diaz in 1976 in Columbia, Maryland. In 1980, Columbia Data Products made some Z80-based computers, most notably their Commander 900 series, which had several models, some of which were multiprocessors and had graphics capabilities.

CDP introduced the MPC 1600 "Multi Personal Computer", designed by David Howse, in June 1982. It was an exact functional copy of the IBM Personal Computer model 5150 except for the BIOS which was clean room designed. IBM had published the bus and BIOS specifications, wrongly assuming that this would not be enough to facilitate unlicensed copying of the design, but be enough to encourage the add-on market.

CDP advertisements stated that the MPC "can use software and hardware originally intended for the IBM Personal Computer". The "Multi" in its name hinted to the fact that it could also run the multi-user operating system MP/M-86. The MPC was the first IBM PC clone and was actually superior to the IBM original.

It came with 128 KB RAM standard, compared to the IBM's 64 KB maximum. The MPC had eight PC expansion slots, with one filled by its video card. Its floppy disk drive interface was built into the motherboard.

The IBM PC, in contrast, had only five expansion slots, with the video card and floppy disk controller taking two of them. The MPC also included two floppy disk drives, one parallel and two serial ports, which were all optional on the original IBM PC. The MPC was followed up with a portable PC, the 32 pound (15 kg) "luggable" Columbia VP in 1983.

In May 1983, Future Computing ranked Columbia and Compaq computers as "Best" in the category of "Operationally Compatible", its highest tier of PC compatibility. PC Magazine in June 1983 criticized the MPC's documentation, but reported that it had very good hardware and software compatibility with the IBM PC. BYTE in November 1984 approved of the portable MPC-VP's PC compatibility, reporting that it ran Microsoft Flight Simulator, WordStar, Lotus 1-2-3, dBASE II, and other popular applications without problems. It concluded that the computer was "one of the best overall bargains on the market today".

The success of the MPC and its successors built CDP revenue from US$9.4 million in 1982 to US$56 million in 1983, with an IPO at US$11 in January 1983.

In February 1984, IBM announced the introduction of their first portable PC, thus putting pressure on its competitors in this niche as well, which besides CDP already included Compaq as the market leader in this segment, as well as Kaypro, TeleVideo Corporation, and Eagle Computer.

Columbia also released upgraded desktop models in order to compete with the IBM PC XT. Their MPC 1600-4, briefly reviewed in PC Magazine of April 1984, was found a worthy competitor of the XT and without major compatibility problems, even though its hard drive controller was quite different from IBM XT's, being based on a Z80 microprocessor with 64 KB of RAM emulating the ASIC used by IBM.

In May 1984, Richard T. Gralton, formerly a vice-chairman of Savin Corporation, became the president and chief operating officer of CDP.

The competition in the PC market became more intense in June–July 1984 with several companies, including IBM, announcing price cuts, and with AT&T entering the PC market as well. Besides CDP, other PC clone companies like Eagle were also having a hard time as a result. Discussing the perspectives of the smaller PC firms like CDP, Eagle, or Corona Data Systems, one Morgan Stanley analyst was quoted in the June 9, 1984, issue of the New York Times saying "Some of them are operating at 5 percent pretax margins, and there is just no room for more price cuts." By August 1984 the CDP sales were faltering and CDP announced layoffs of 114 employees at its Maryland headquarters and 409 employees at a second factory in Gurabo, Puerto Rico. By April 1985 their stock had dropped to US$0.50 and was delisted. The company filed for Chapter 11 protection in May 1985.

=== 1986–present: As a software company ===
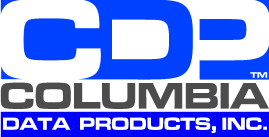
Logo used from 1986 to 2013

In April 1986, Godfather's Used Computer Syndicate, a long-time vendor of CDP's MPC line based in Forest City, Florida, acquired CDP's intellectual property and assets and revived the Columbia Data Products name, selling off the company's remaining unsold inventory while announcing new PC compatibles.

In 1987 CDP shifted emphasis from hardware to software. They developed and licensed Small Computer System Interface (SCSI) software to Western Digital (WD), a supplier of hard drive controllers. In 1991, WD sold their SCSI business to Future Domain, where it languished.

CDP is now headquartered in Altamonte Springs, Florida. The company currently specializes in data backup.

== See also ==
- Altos Computer Systems
- Compaq Portable
- Hyperion (computer)
- Seequa Chameleon
