= Corona Data Systems =

American personal computer company

- Industry: Computer hardware
- Founded: Westlake Village, California, United States (1982)
- Founder: Robert Harp
- Defunct: 1993
- Fate: Acquired
- Headquarters: Westlake Village, California, USA
- Area served: Worldwide
- Products: desktops portables
- Owner: Daewoo

Corona Data Systems, later renamed Cordata, was an American personal computer company. It was one of the earliest IBM PC compatible computer system companies. Manufacturing was primarily done by Daewoo of Korea, which became a major investor in the company and ultimately the owner.

== History ==
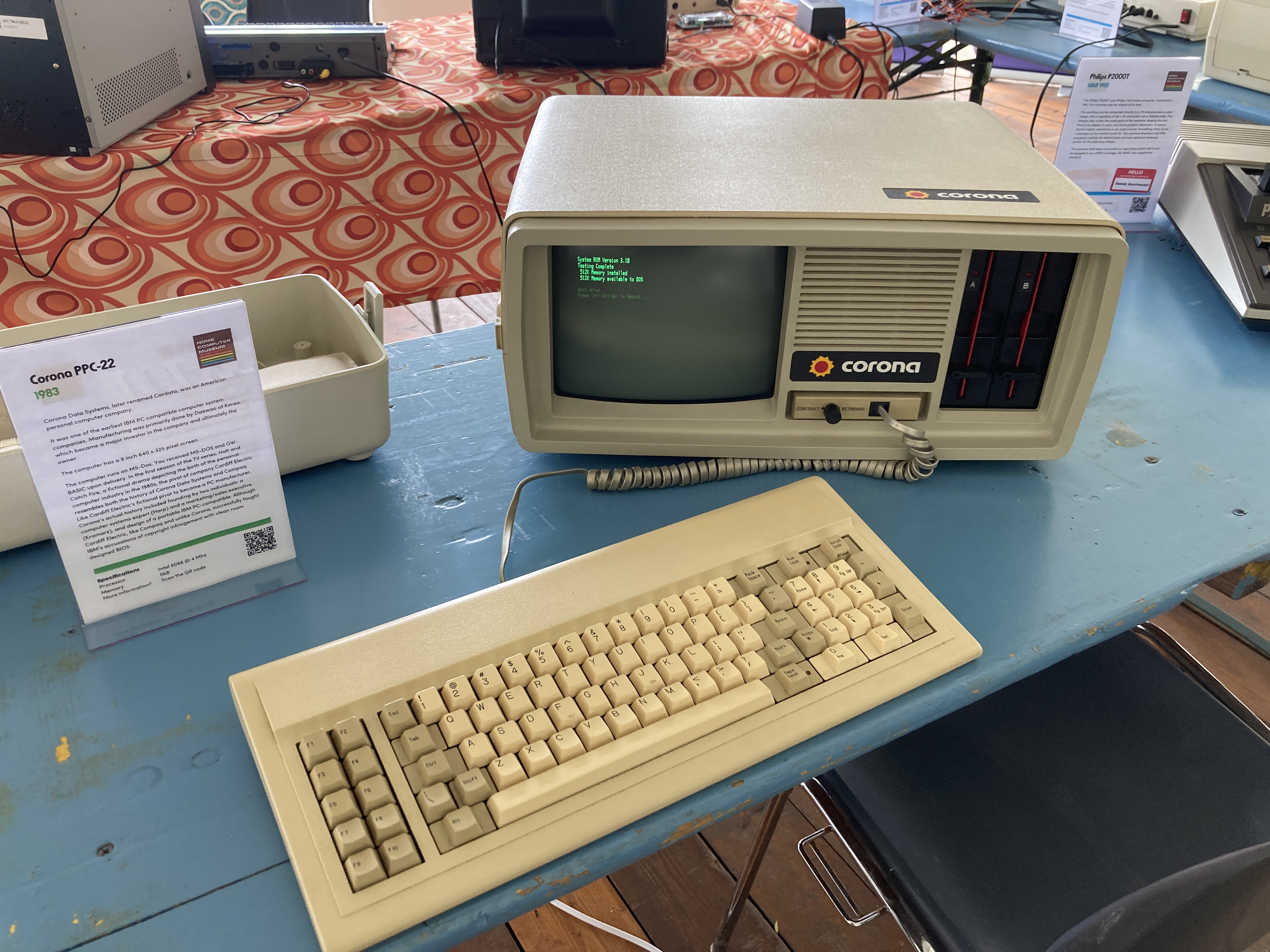
Corona PPC-22 by Corona Data Systems

Founded in mid-1981 by Robert Harp, who co-founded Vector Graphic. Along with Harp, the firm was co-founded by Robert Steven Kramarz who at age 31 was employee #1 and General Manager. Daniel R. Carter was named as CEO a year later. By 1984, Corona employed 280 people. In mid-1985 the firm received fresh capital from the Daewoo Group of South Korea who acquired a controlling interest.

Corona Data System's first products were 5MB and 10MB external hard drives with interface cards and software to connect them to the Apple II and the IBM PC. The drives were sold under the brand name Starfire (Starfire 5 and Starfire 10). The original Corona PC was later released in 1983. The company went on to develop and release additional desktop and portable PCs corresponding to the development of the Intel x86 architecture through the 80386, as well a laser printer (the LP300) and an integrated desktop publishing system known as Intellipress. The latter offered either Aldus PageMaker or Ventura Publisher as software bundles. The laser printer was based on the Canon CX engine, but unlike competing products from HP and Apple, the printer's raster image processor was on an interface card inside the PC, which partially used the PC's processor for image processing thus reducing product cost.

=== IBM Lawsuit ===
Corona claimed "Our systems run all software that conforms to IBM PC programming standards. And the most popular software does." In early 1984, IBM sued Corona and Eagle Computer for copyright violation of the IBM PC BIOS. Corona settled with IBM by agreeing to cease infringement.

=== Corona PPC-400 ===
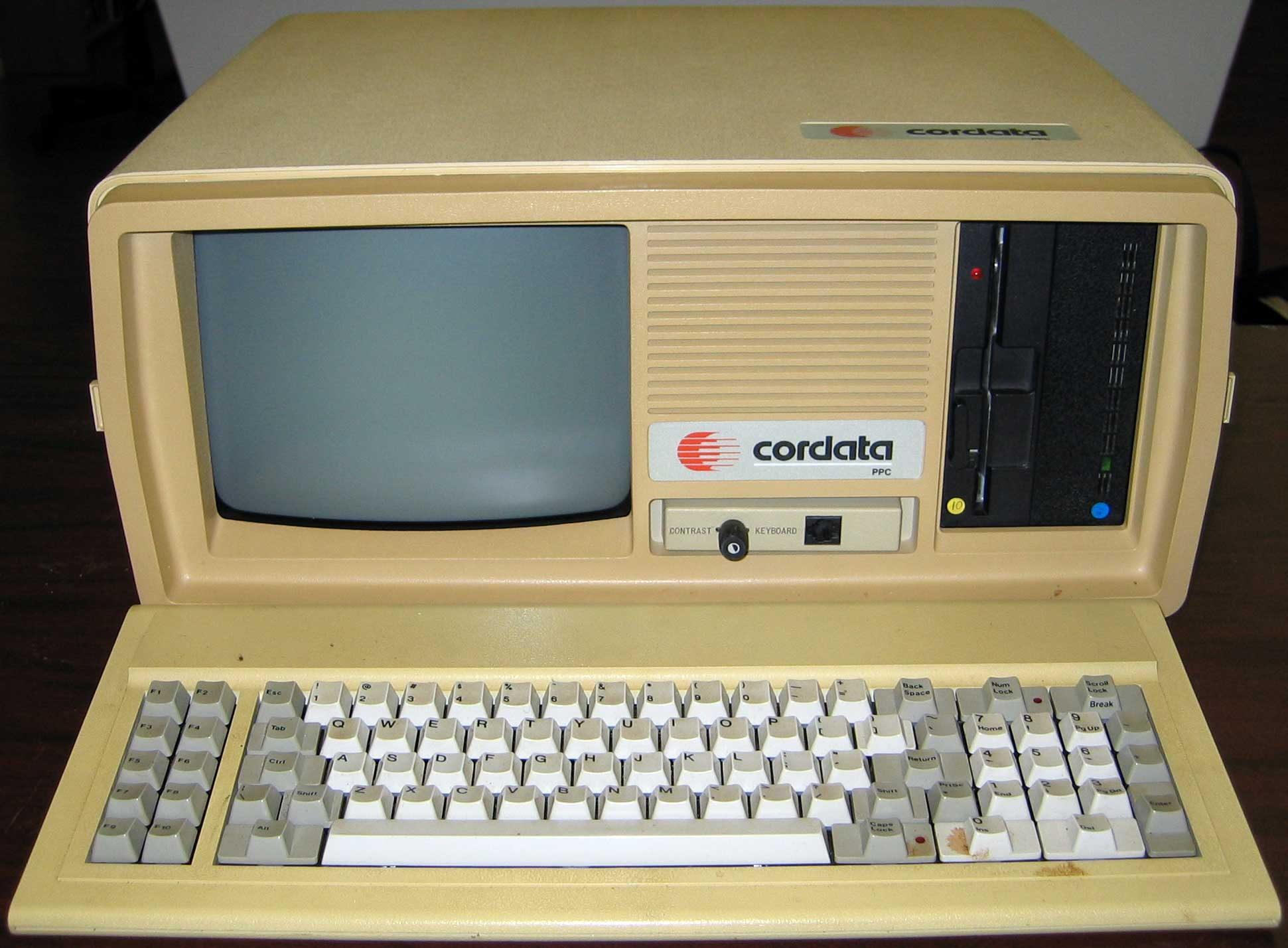
Cordata Portable PC PPC-400, image courtesy of Personal Computer Museum

Corona Portable PC Model PPC-400, arguably the most notable Corona computer, was introduced in 1984. The PPC-400 was remarkable for its elegant and clear screen fonts. The desktop version was the PC-400.

=== Cordata ===
Cordata logo

After Daewoo acquired a 70% share in the company, Corona Data Systems was renamed Cordata in 1986 in order to reflect diversification and to try to distance itself from identification as just a "PC clone" manufacturer. Harp resigned in 1987, accusing Daewoo of transforming the company into a paper-only entity for the purpose of loss write-off. According to Harp, Cordata had posted $20M losses in the previous year despite the $40M investment made by Daewoo since 1985. Daewoo phased out the Cordata name in 1993.

=== In popular culture ===
In the first season of the TV series, Halt and Catch Fire, a fictional drama depicting the birth of the personal computer industry in the 1980s, the pivot of company Cardiff Electric resembles both the history of Corona Data Systems and Compaq. Like Cardiff Electric's fictional pivot to become a PC manufacturer, Corona's actual history included founding by two individuals: a computer systems expert (Harp) and a marketing/sales executive (Kramarz), and design of a portable IBM PC-compatible. While Cardiff Electric and Compaq succeeded in fighting IBM's accusations of copyright infringement with clean room designed BIOS, Corona did not. Also like Cardiff, Corona Data Systems in 1985 sold a majority share to a conglomerate (Daewoo Group).

== Competitors ==
Early IBM PC compatible computer system companies:

- Compaq Portable
- Columbia Data Products
- Eagle Computer
- IBM Personal Computer
- Seequa Chameleon
- Hyperion (computer)
- Kaypro

== See also ==
- Leading Edge Hardware Products, another American computer company acquired by Daewoo
- List of computer system manufacturers
