= Eagle Computer =

Early personal computer manufacturer

Eagle Computer, Inc.
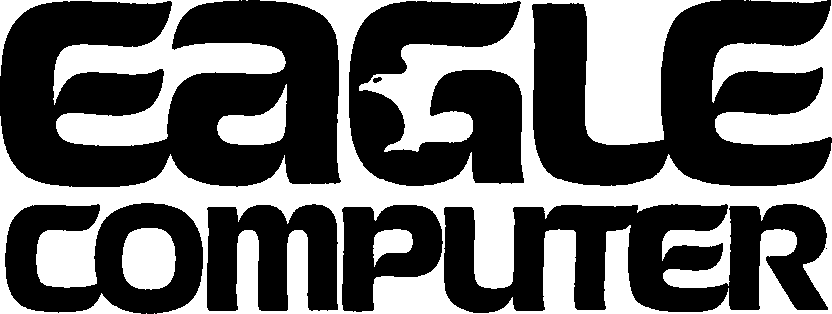

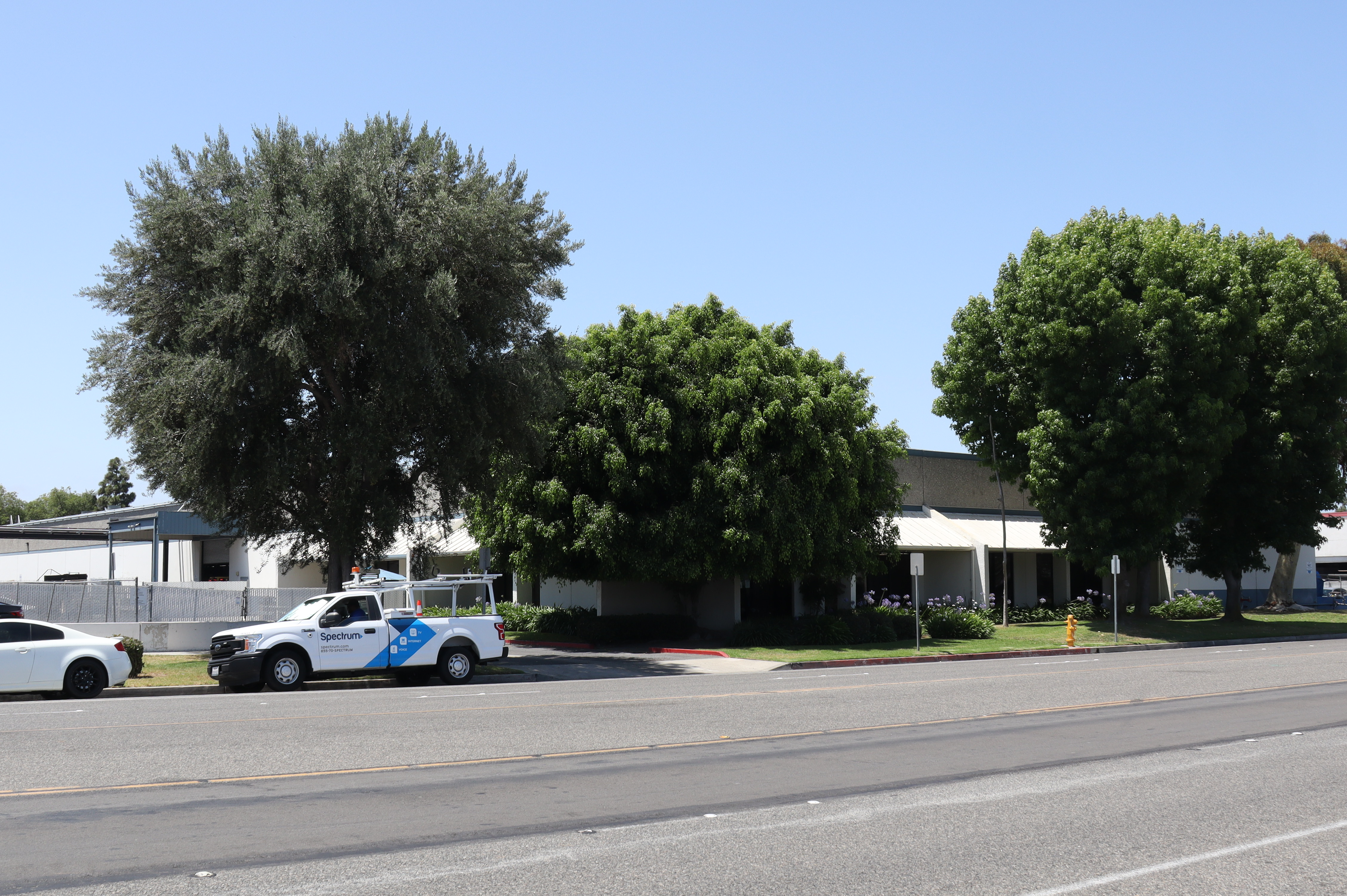
- 7100 Chapman Ave, site of former manufacturing plant in Garden Grove, California
- Type: Private
- Industry: Computer
- Founded: 1978
- Founder: Gary Kappenman
- Defunct: July 1986
- Fate: Chapter 7 bankruptcy liquidation
- Headquarters: Garden Grove, California, United States

Eagle Computer, Inc., was an early American computer company based in Los Gatos, California. Spun off from Audio-Visual Laboratories (AVL), it first sold a line of popular CP/M computers which were highly praised in the computer magazines of the day. After the IBM PC was launched, Eagle produced the Eagle 1600 series, which ran MS-DOS but were not true clones. When it became evident that the buying public wanted actual clones of the IBM PC, even if a non-clone had better features, Eagle responded with a line of clones, including a portable.

== CP/M models ==
=== Multi-image models ===
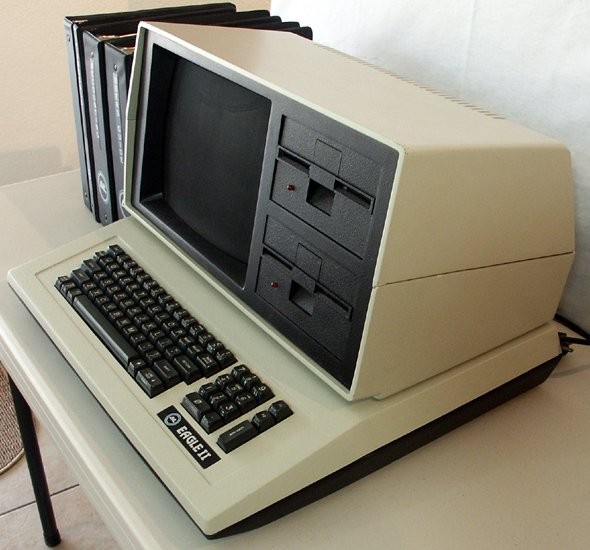
An AVL Eagle II computer

The AVL Eagle I and II had audio-visual connectors on the back. As a separate company, Eagle sold the Eagle I, II, III, IV, and V computer models and external SCSI/SASI hard-disk boxes called the File 10 and the File 40.

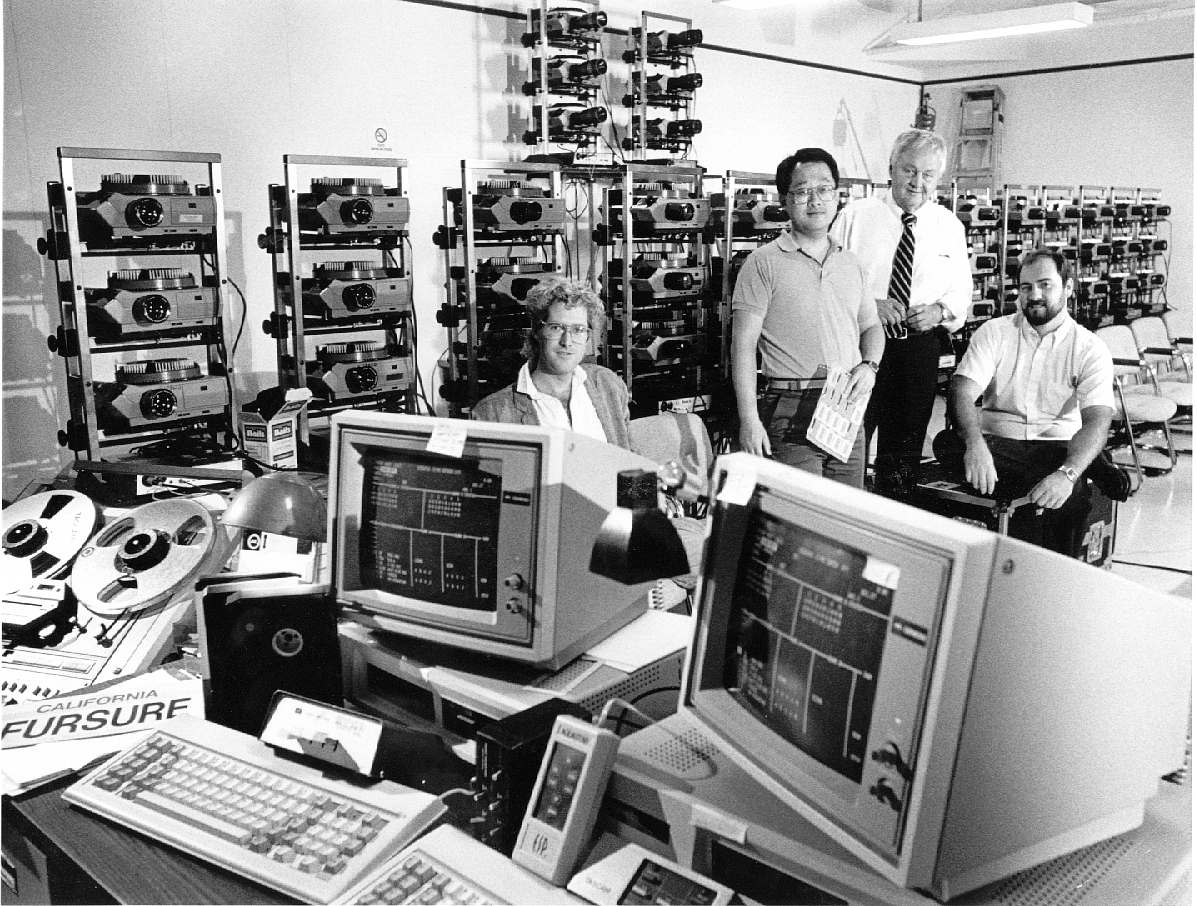
Technical setup for the 1988 Ford New Car Announcement Show, AVL Eagle computers in the foreground; background, from left: Brad Smith (art director), Sung Lee (producer/art director), Bob Kassal (executive producer), Paul Jackson (producer/programmer). 1987, Detroit, MI

The first Eagle computers were produced by Audio Visual Labs (AVL), a company founded by Gary Kappenman in New Jersey in the early 1970s to produce proprietary large-format equipment for multi-image presentations. Kappenman introduced the world's first microprocessor-controlled multi-image programming computers, the ShowPro III and V, which were dedicated controllers. In 1980, AVL introduced the first non-dedicated controller, the Eagle. This first Eagle computer used a 16 kHz processor and had a 5 1/4-inch disk drive for online storage.

The Eagle ran PROCALL (PROgrammable Computer Audio-visual Language Library) software for writing cues to control up to 30 Ektagraphic projectors, five 16 mm film projectors and 20 auxiliary control points. Digital control data was sourced via an RCA or XLR-type audio connector at the rear of the unit. AVL's proprietary "ClockTrak" (a biphase digital timecode similar to, but incompatible with SMPTE timecode) was sourced from the control channel of a multitrack analog audio tape deck. The timed list of events in the Eagle was synchronized to the ClockTrak. Later versions of PROCALL included the option of using SMPTE timecode. Most programmers abandoned ClockTrak for SMPTE, as more multi-image programs began to incorporate video.

Two separate digital data streams were output from the Eagle via RCA or XLR-type audio connectors. These two telemetry streams, called "PosiTrak", each controlled up to five external slide projector control devices manufactured by AVL, known as "Doves". The Dove units received biphase data from the Eagle via audio cables and interpreted the Eagle's data streams to control as many as three Kodak Ektagraphic projectors (for large screens, compatible xenon-lamped projectors) and two dry-closure contacts per Dove unit. So then, on its own, the AVL Eagle can drive a multi-image slideshow of up to 30 projectors. AVL also made the Raven, a device similar to the Dove, for comprehensive control of a single 16 mm film projector and numerous other external control devices for lighting, sound, video projectors, and sources, etc.

When properly set up and powered, AVL Eagles and associated products were extremely reliable. During the 1970s through the early 1990s, when its competitors' products were not as reliable nor readily available, AVL became the industry standard for multi-image control equipment. However, the development of large-screen electronic media and HDTV ushered out the era of film-based multi-image productions.

=== Basic design ===
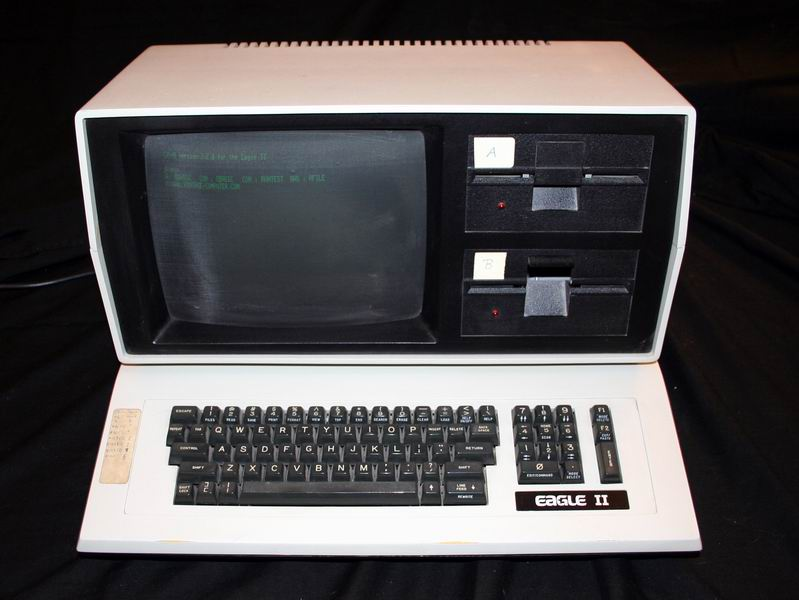
The one-piece Eagle II computer

All CP/M Eagles had the same basic design, except for the storage devices. The exception was a portable model, in which the keyboard formed a removable lid that could be snapped to the main unit for traveling. An attractive off-white case held the entire computer. The top section had a green monochrome monitor on the left and one or two full-height storage devices stacked above the other on the right. An anti-glare screen was held in place against the front of the monitor, and the front of the top section was shut by a black plastic bezel. This bezel snapped into place. The back of this section held a fan behind the drive enclosure and a silver label behind the monitor with the company logo, address, model number, serial number, voltage, frequency, and current.

The bottom section projected forward and had the keyboard and the system logo on its top. Inside this "clamshell" was the main circuit board, connected to the monitor, drives, keyboard, and ports by cables. A Xebec hard-disk controller card was underneath the main board and connected to it by cables. On the back of the clamshell was the reset button, two RS-232 serial ports labeled "Serial A" and "Serial B", a Centronics parallel port labeled "Parallel A", a SASI port labeled "Parallel B", the brightness knob for the monitor, and the on/off switch.

The keyboard was well-designed. The keys were black with white lettering. Besides a full typewriter keyboard, there was a complete ten-key number pad on the right, uncommon at that time. Labels on the front of the number keys of the typewriter keyboard, and all the keys of the number pad, denoted what function those keys performed in the command mode of the bundled Spellbinder software.

The CPU of the whole line was a 4 MHz Zilog Z80A, the standard microprocessor of the day. Memory was 64K, which was all the RAM that the standard CP/M 2.2 operating system could address with an 8-bit chip.

=== Storage options ===
| Model | 5.25" Floppy-disk drives | Hard disk | Additional | Price in 1982 |
|---|---|---|---|---|
| I | 1 SSQD 382K | None | None | $1000 |
| II | 2 SSQD 382K | None | None | $1200 |
| III | 2 DSQD 784K | None | None | $1600 |
| IV | 1 DSQD 784K | 10 MB | SASI board, second power supply | $2600 |
| V | 1 DSQD 784K | 32 MB | SASI board, second power supply | $3000 |

Also available were external hard-disk units called the File 10 and File 40. These were metal Corvus boxes with a fan and power switch on the back. Inside a File 10 was the same hard disk as an Eagle IV had, the same Eagle SASI card, and a power supply. The File 40 had the same 32 MB hard disk as an Eagle V.

To upgrade an Eagle III, for instance, the user could buy a File 40, connect it to the "Parallel B" port on the back of the Eagle with the ribbon cable that came with it, turn on the File 40, and turn on the Eagle. If a File 10 or File 40 was attached and turned on when an Eagle I, II, or III was turned on, the computer booted from the hard disk in the external box, even if a bootable floppy disk was in a floppy-disk drive.

An Eagle III with a File 10 attached had the same hard-disk storage as an Eagle IV, but two floppy-disk drives instead of one. Similarly, with a File 40 attached, it was functionally the same as an Eagle V with an extra floppy-disk drive.

=== Upgrades and modifications ===
==== Hardware changes ====
The original AVL Eagle was an S-100 8080 computer with separate boards for the AVL multi-image interface, the Intel 8080 CPU, floppy drive interface and 16Kb memory cards of which the standard machines only had one. Extra 16Kb memory boards were available if a user could afford one. The boot floppy did not offer to run anything other than Procall unless a user paid for one to run the Electric Pencil word processor.

Eagles were easy to open and easy to upgrade. The only difference between an Eagle I and an Eagle II, for instance, was the number of floppy-disk drives. By adding the right drives, and a hard disk, SASI card, and extra power supply, a I could be upgraded to a II, III, IV, or V; a III could become a IV or V; a IV could become a V.

When half-height floppy-disk drives and hard disks became available, Eagle drives that had worn out could be replaced with ones that took up less space and drew less power. The Eagle BIOS supported up to two double-sided floppy-disk drives and up to four 8 MB hard-disk partitions. Systems could be built with two half-height floppies and a 10, 20, or 32 MB hard disk. (A system with two floppies and a 10 MB hard disk was jokingly called a "IV plus", while one with a 20 MB hard disk was called a "4 and a half" however many floppies it had.)

Just to see whether it would work, Eagle Computer Users Group members mounted two half-height 10-MB hard disks in an Eagle, each attached to its own SASI card, both cards connected to the same Xebec controller. This "IV by two" worked perfectly, but it was a waste of resources; the Eagle SASI card was the rarest and hardest-to-find part in the computer, since only Eagle made them and not all Eagles had them to begin with.

==== Software changes ====
Computer hobbyists continued to improve CP/M in various ways even after Digital Research was no longer in business. A computer was said to be running the Z-System, rather than CP/M, if the CP/M CCP had been replaced by ZCPR or a similar command processor, the BDOS had been replaced by ZRDOS or Z3DOS, or both. This could be done manually, if the source code for the BIOS were available, or automatically with various packages.

One long-term concern with Eagles was how loud the hard disks were, and how they seemed to hunt over and over whenever reading or writing data. NZ-COM from Alpha Systems Corporation allowed the hard disk of the Eagle IV to run more quickly and quietly. This observation was confirmed whenever an Eagle had the Z-System installed.

=== Software ===
The software for the CP/M Eagles came on 5.25" floppy disks:

| Disk label | Contents | On booting, displays |
|---|---|---|
| System | CP/M, Eagle utilities, CBASIC | A:> prompt |
| Spellbinder | wordprocessor | Menu |
| Ultracalc | spreadsheet | Menu |

For customers who bought an Eagle IV, Eagle V, File 10, or File 40, all of the software was already installed.

==== CP/M operating system ====
BIOS: CP/M consisted of three parts, two of which were machine independent and were copyrighted by Digital Research. The third part, the BIOS, was the interface between the operating system and the hardware, and varied between the systems of different computer manufacturers, and sometimes between different models from the same company. The BIOS was written by the manufacturer and copyrighted by that company. There were three Eagle BIOSes:

- The Eagle II BIOS supported 2 single-sided floppy-disk drives. It was used by the Eagle I and II.
- The Eagle III BIOS supported 2 double-sided floppy-disk drives. It was used by the Eagle III.
- The Eagle V BIOS supported 2 double-sided floppy-disk drives and 4 hard-disk partitions. It was used by the Eagle IV and V.

Disk formats: The format for floppy disks and hard disks is defined in the BIOS, and every manufacturer of a CP/M computer had its own. Eagle kept it simple.

There was a single-sided floppy-disk format, and a double-sided one. Furthermore, they were identical on one side. The double-sided format filled up the whole first side just like the single-sided format, then continued on the second side. This was not as efficient as first writing one track to one side of the disk, and then one track to the other, before moving the drive head to the next track, but it was done deliberately to make the two formats as alike as possible. A customer who upgraded from a I or II to a III, IV, or V did not need to copy his old disks to the format of his new machine.

There was only one hard-disk format. The format program required a hard disk with the right number of heads, platters, and cylinders. There were numerous makes and models of 10, 20, and 32 MB hard disks that met that requirement. The program formatted the hard disk 8 megabytes at a time (CP/M's limit for a logical disk drive) until it had successfully finished four partitions and quit, or suddenly ran out of hard disk. Thus a 10 MB hard disk had an 8 MB partition and a 2 MB partition; a 20 MB hard disk had two 8 MB partitions and one 4 MB partition; and a 32 MB hard disk had four 8 MB partitions. (The "IV by 2" mentioned above had four partitions, 8 MB, 2 MB, 8 MB, and 2 MB.)

Drive letters: In CP/M, the drive booted from is drive A, whether it's a floppy disk or a hard disk. In addition, double-sided Eagles addressed single-sided floppies as drive I or J. Which drive letter applied to which device did not change on a given system, but modifying systems could be confusing:

| Model | Floppy-disk drives | Hard-disk partitions |
|---|---|---|
| I | Top: A (single-sided) | None |
| II | Top: A (single-sided) Bottom: B (single-sided) | None |
| III | Top: A (double-sided), I (single-sided) Bottom: B (double-sided), J (single-sided) | None |
| IV | Top: E (double-sided), I (single-sided) Bottom: F (double-sided), J (single-sided) | A (8 MB), B (2 MB) |
| V | Top: E (double-sided), I (single-sided) Bottom: F (double-sided), J (single-sided) | A, B, C, and D (8 MB each) |

If an Eagle booted from a File 10, File 40, or "File 20" (a File 10 or File 40 box with a 20-Mb hard disk inside), the drive-letter assignments of the hard-disk BIOS prevailed. The external hard disk's partitions would be A and B for a File 10; A, B, and C for a "File 20", and A, B, C, and D for a File 40. The top floppy would be E and I and the bottom one F and J, unless they were single-sided floppies, which could only be I and J.

Since the hard-disk BIOS only addressed four hard-disk partitions, an Eagle IV with a File 10 attached would address the two partitions of the File 10 as A and B, and the two in the Eagle as C and D. With a "File 20" attached, the external partitions would be A, B, and C, the 8 MB internal partition would be D, and the other internal partition couldn't be used at all. Similarly, with a File 40 attached, no partitions of a hard disk in the Eagle could be read from or written to, because all available hard-disk partitions were assigned to the File 40.

Utilities: All the standard CP/M utilities were included: PIP to copy files, etc. DRI's sophisticated compiled BASIC programming language, CBASIC, was also included.

==== Eagle utilities ====
Every CP/M computer manufacturer supplied additional software utilities, in much the same way that Linux distributions add their own installer, etc. to the standard kernel and libraries. On Eagles, they were:

1. HELLO: In CP/M there is a memory address which holds 8 bytes, normally blank. If this location is patched with a word like "HELLO ", then the operating system, after booting will look for a HELLO.COM or HELLO.BAT, and if it finds one, will run it. All the Eagle software disks except the system disk, and all Eagle hard-disk systems, ran a menu program on booting. The bundled software appears on this menu, so the user doesn't have to type the names of the programs at all, just type a number from the menu. A utilities sub-menu even includes things like "Copy from the top floppy to the bottom floppy" and "Turn off the computer safely" so that the customer doesn't have to learn PIP or remember to park the hard disk. More experienced users could exit from the menu program, rename HELLO.COM to something else to prevent it running, or even patch CP/M to remove the "HELLO " entry.
2. FORMAT and HDFORMAT: These are the floppy-disk and hard-disk formatting programs, described above under the CP/M BIOS.
3. BACKUP: This program let the user specify what files he wanted to back up from a hard disk and save on floppies; and he could save the specification list in a file. With a floppy-disk format of about 3/4 of a megabyte, it only took 12 or 13 floppies to back up an Eagle IV, even if the hard disk was full. When the user ran BACKUP, it asked for a name for the set and a comment to identify it; this information was stored on each floppy disk of the set. It didn't matter what size the files were because of BACKUP's intelligent design. If it ran out of disk space in the middle of a file, BACKUP asked its owner to insert the next disk, and continued backing up the file onto the next disk.
4. RESTORE: Like BACKUP, RESTORE allowed an Eagle user to specify the file(s) to work on, in a specification file. If a file to be restored had been divided across two or more disks, RESTORE would ask for disks as it needed them, and tell its user if he put in the wrong disk. Of course, if a file weren't divided, and the user knew what disk it was on, he could also restore it with PIP or some regular copy program.
5. PWRDWN: When Eagles were made, hard-disk read/write heads would come down on the platter when turned off, and data could be lost unless they were first moved to a special location. The PWRDWN command parked the head so an Eagle with a hard disk could be turned off safely.

==== Spellbinder word processor ====
Spellbinder, from Lexisoft, was a powerful word processor which was highly configurable and even had a built-in programming language for automating tasks. Eagle computers came with a version of Spellbinder already configured, with many functions already assigned to keys (the keys had labels on their fronts to show their Spellbinder functions). The only configuration needed, then, was to set it up for a given printer; and for most printers, that just meant choosing the printer off a list.

==== Accounting Plus or Ultracalc ====
Eagles were marketed as business machines, so financial software had to be part of the package. Originally this was Accounting Plus, a professional bookkeeping system so large that it took six Eagle double-sided 784 kB floppy disks to hold it all, and required constant disk swapping on an Eagle without a hard disk.

Constant protests, questions, and requests for customer support led Eagle to stop bundling Accounting Plus with its computers. Most users simply didn't need all that. Ultracalc, a spreadsheet program from Lattice, was substituted in later machines.

=== Manuals ===
Eagles early enough to come with Accounting Plus, whether made by AVL or Eagle, had two black binders of documentation. One, labeled "Accounting", was the Accounting Plus manual. The binder labeled "Users Guide" contained everything else.

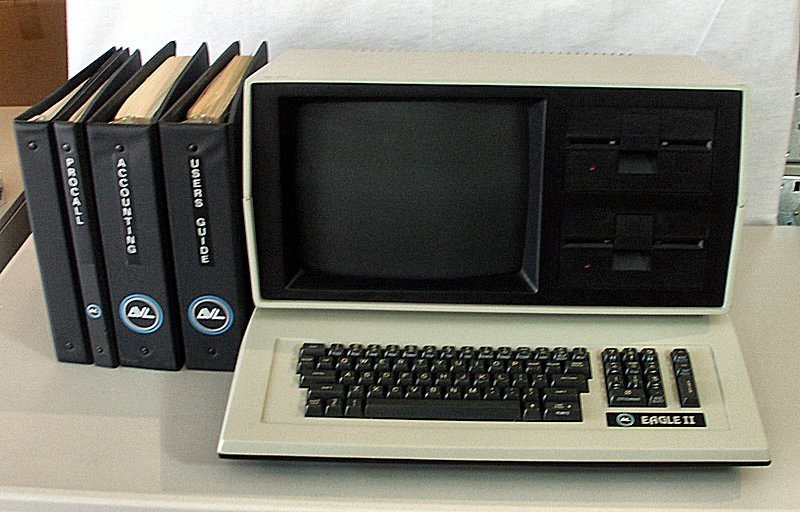
AVL Eagle with documentation

PROCALL (PROgrammable Computer Audio-visual Language Library) - see the description of this software earlier in this article.

Later Eagles had a single white binder with the Eagle logo across the top of the spine and "Eagle Software Manual" down along it. This was a manual written by Eagle which told how to use the computer, including Spellbinder and Ultracalc, without distinguishing Eagle's software from Lexisoft's or Lattice's. Mentors at Eagle Computer User Group meetings would often have to explain, in fact, that there were separate programs on the computer, written by separate companies; between the manual and the menu system, it looked like one big program to the new computer user.

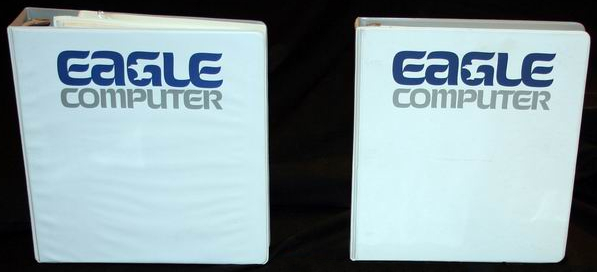
Eagle binders and some extras

The only other thing in the documentation binder was a thin spiral-bound book called "CP/M Primer," which gave a very superficial idea of what an operating system was, why you had to format disks before using them, and so forth. Vendors would often throw in the Digital Research "CP/M 2.2 User Guide," the "CBASIC User Guide", or a good book on CP/M such as "Mastering CP/M" or "The CP/M Handbook with MP/M." But they weren't part of the standard Eagle documentation.

=== IIE or not IIE ===
The Eagle II and IIE keyboard labels

In a confusing marketing move, Eagle renamed its 8-bit CP/M line at about the same time that it introduced its first 16-bit computers. Prior to the change, the logo on the keyboard announced the computer's model as Eagle I, II, III, IV, or V.

However, Eagle consolidated the entire line as the "Eagle IIE" series, which resulted in the labels indicating no differentiation between the five 8-bit models:

The silver label on the back of each machine then specified the individual model as IIE-1, IIE-2, IIE-3, IIE-4, or IIE-5, corresponding to the previously named Eagle I, II, III, IV, and V.

=== Old Eagles today ===
Some causes of failure may be expected in any computer built the same way. If chips are attached to the boards in sockets rather than soldered on, they may be loose because they expanded from heat whenever the computer was on for a long time, then contracted whenever the computer was turned off. A computer used a great deal and for a long time may require a new owner to open it up and gently press the chips down before it runs.

Another problem sometimes found in old Eagles with hard disks is stiction. Hard disk read/write heads from that era rested on the platter when turned off and may adhere to where they have been sitting with greater force than the drive motor can exert on starting. An experienced technician may coax the head free without destroying the hard disk or losing data.

The most common problem peculiar to CP/M Eagles involves the character generator chip on the main board. It tends to fail with age so that a line of text will have the dots of its letters scattered unreadably all over the screen. When this problem became apparent, the chip was no longer made, but they were still available in parts warehouses.

== 1600 series ==
The Eagle 1600 series of computers runs MS-DOS but are not fully PC compatible. They were the first PCs to be based on the fully 16-bit Intel 8086 processor, rather than the Intel 8088, which uses 16 bits internally, but only has an 8-bit external interface. Eagle attempted to create a niche for itself in the brand-new "16-bit" market by building machines that are as easy to use as their CP/M models, but with an Intel CPU and 640 kB of RAM (which is more memory than almost any other PC at that time had to offer).

These computers came with MS-DOS, the PC version of Spellbinder, a PC spreadsheet program, and documentation. They run many PC programs including Lotus 1-2-3, but not Concurrent CP/M-86. At the time most PC programs were recent ports from CP/M and there was little agreement about standards. The fact that the 1600s are not IBM clones means that games that expect exactly the same video hardware as an IBM PC, or that call PC hardware or the PC ROM BIOS directly for the sake of speed, do not run or ran very poorly.

The 1600 line are also the first computers with MS-DOS to have hard disks. Eagle achieved this by using the same hard-disk subsystem (Xebec hard-disk controller card, Eagle SASI card, and hard disk) as in the CP/M models. Subdirectories are not supported in the MS-DOS version that the Eagles used, just as in CP/M. MS-DOS does not offer CP/M's 16 numbered "user zones" either, which limits the usefulness of the hard disks.

== Eagle PCs and IPO ==
Eagle was also one of the first manufacturers of clones of the IBM PC. The Eagle PC was introduced in 1982. It had enhanced 752 × 352 graphics compared to the IBM PC's 640 × 200 graphics resolution, and it was quieter because it did not need a cooling fan. The PC 2 followed, but the screen resolution was downgraded to match that of the IBM PC. Later, the Eagle Spirit portable came out, and the Eagle Turbo.

This transportable Spirit computer weighed 33 pounds (15 kg), and was fully compatible with the IBM PC-XT. It had a built-in 9-inch (23 cm) monochrome monitor, one or two 5 1/4" disk-drives (320k) and a 10 Mb hard-disk for the "1-disk model". This hard-disk was half thinner than "classic" hard-disks of that time (Slimline technology). It also had a color graphic board but the built-in monitor was monochrome (no color model was available). The Eagle Spirit could be booted with the original IBM PC boot disks. The disks capacity and format procedure were the same. The graphic resolution was the same as the IBM PC: 320 x 200. The Eagle PC, launched one year earlier, had a high resolution of 720 x 352.

Spellbinder was renamed Eaglewriter on the Eagle PCs, and the spreadsheet program was called Eaglecalc. No functional changes were made to either program.

On June 8, 1983, the day Eagle's initial public offering made him a multimillionaire, president and CEO Dennis Barnhart died in the crash of his Ferrari as he was heading home. With him in the car was another businessman who was considering buying either the Ferrari or Barnhart's Porsche; who was driving was initially unknown. Ronald Mickwee became president and CEO of Eagle. Because of the death, the underwriters reversed the IPO, refunding the money that investors had paid for the stock, and held another IPO a few months later, which was unprecedented in the PC industry. The dramatic timing has led to speculation that this event caused the end of Eagle.

The company continued to lead PC sales until IBM launched a lawsuit against some PC clone manufactures like Eagle, Corona Data Systems, and Handwell Corporation claiming copyright infringement of their BIOS code. All the companies named settled out of court, agreeing to re-implement their BIOS in a way that did not violate IBM's copyrights. (This led to companies like Phoenix Technologies offering PC clone manufacturers BIOSes that were written using clean room design.) Concomitantly with the lawsuits, IBM slashed prices for its own products; discussing the perspectives of the smaller PC firms like Eagle, one Morgan Stanley analyst was quoted in the June 9, 1984, edition of the New York Times saying "Some of them are operating at 5 percent pretax margins, and there is just no room for more price cuts."

Eagle rewrote its BIOS, but it never regained its lost sales. In what was a pioneering effort at the time, an initiative was launched to create a new market selling Eagle systems to China. This effort eventually fell through and the company, like many others affected by the BIOS copyright restrictions, was ultimately unable to recover; Eagle was out of business by 1986.

== User groups ==
The Eagle Computer User Group in San Jose, California, was the primary Eagle user group. It drew attendees from all over the San Francisco Bay Area for its monthly meetings, and Eagle users all over the United States paid dues and got its newsletter. Meetings generally consisted of more experienced Eagle owners showing others how to use the advanced features of the bundled software, or configuring printers. Actual presentations were rare but welcome.

Another user group was called The Screaming Eagles, and the two groups sent each other their newsletters every month.

== See also ==
- Altos Computer Systems
- Columbia Data Products
- Compaq Portable series
- Corona Data Systems
- Halt and Catch Fire, TV series set in the personal computer revolution
- Hyperion (computer)
- Kaypro II
- List of computers running CP/M
- Osborne 1
- Seequa Chameleon
