= Compaq Portable II =

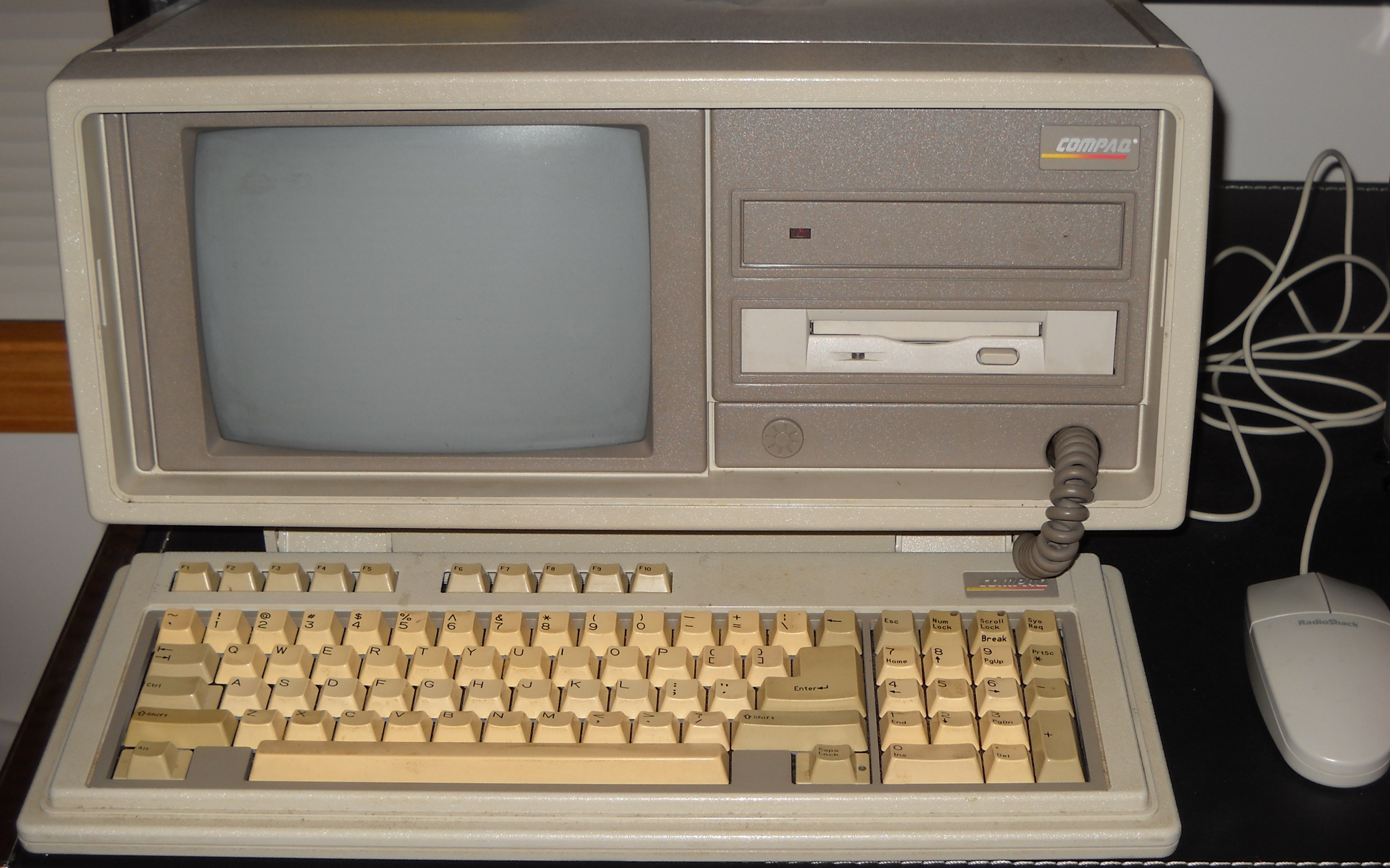
- A Compaq Portable II with an aftermarket 3.5" floppy drive replacing the 5.25" floppy drive and cover over the drive it came with.
- Manufacturer: Compaq Computer Corporation, United States
- Type: Portable computer
- Released: February 20, 1986; 40 years ago
- Introductory price: US$3,499 (equivalent to $10,280 in 2025)
- Operating system: MS-DOS 3.1
- CPU: Intel 80286 @ 6 or 8MHz (dual-speed)
- Memory: 256 KB – 640 KB
- Storage: 360 KB 5.25" floppy drive optional 10-20MB hard drive
- Display: 9" Monochrome monitor
- Graphics: 720×350 (text mode), 640×200 (graphics mode)
- Sound: PC speaker
- Input: Serial mouse, 84-key keyboard, light pen
- Connectivity: CGA, composite, serial, parallel
- Dimensions: 7.5" × 13.9" × 17.7" (19.1cm × 35.3cm × 45cm)
- Weight: 23.6 lbs (10.7 kg)
- Predecessor: Compaq Portable 286
- Successor: Compaq Portable III

The Compaq Portable II is the fourth product in the Compaq Portable series to be released by the Compaq Computer Corporation. Released in 1986 at a price of US$3499, the Portable II much improved upon its predecessor, the Compaq 286, which had been Compaq's version of the PC AT in the original Compaq Portable chassis; Portable 286 came equipped with 6/8-MHz Intel 286 and a high-speed 10 or 20 MB hard drive, while the Portable II included an 8 MHz processor, and was lighter and smaller than the previous Compaq Portables. There were four models of the Compaq Portable II. The basic Model 1 shipped one 5.25" floppy drive and 256 KB of RAM. The Model 2 added a second 5.25" floppy drive and sold for $3599. The Model 3 shipped with a 10 MB hard disk in addition to one 5.25" floppy drive and 640 KB of RAM for $4799 at launch. The Model 4 would upgrade the Model 3 with a 20 MB hard drive and sold for $4999. There also may have been 4.1 MB of RAM included at one point. The Compaq Portable II was significantly lighter than its predecessors, the Model 1 weighed just 23.6 pounds compared to the 30.5 pounds the Compaq Portable 286 weighed. Compaq only shipped the system with a small demo disk, MS-DOS 3.1 had to be purchased separately.

There are at least two reported cases of improperly serviced computers exploding when the non-rechargeable lithium battery on the motherboard was connected to the power supply. There were no recorded injuries. The Compaq Portable II was succeeded by the Compaq Portable III in 1987.

== Hardware ==
The Compaq Portable II had room for additional after-market upgrades. Compaq manufactured four memory expansion boards, 512 KB and 2048 KB ISA memory cards and 512 KB and 1536 KB memory boards that attached to the back of the motherboard. With 640 KB installed on the motherboard and both the ISA card and the expansion board, the computer could be upgraded with up to a maximum of 4.125 MB of RAM. The motherboard also had space for an optional 80287 math coprocessor. There were two revisions of the motherboard, they were functionally identical although the earlier version was larger. The motherboard had four ISA slots for expansion cards, two 8-bit and two 16-bit. However, the first 16-bit ISA slot was occupied by a Multi I/O board with serial, parallel, PATA and Floppy interfaces, and the second 8-bit ISA slot was used by the CGA graphics card, leaving two available slots. The keyboard is hardwired in, but it uses standard PS/2 signaling, so a DIN or PS/2 socket can be retrofitted to allow use of common PS/2 keyboards (but not USB ones).
