= Compaq Portable III =

1986 computer

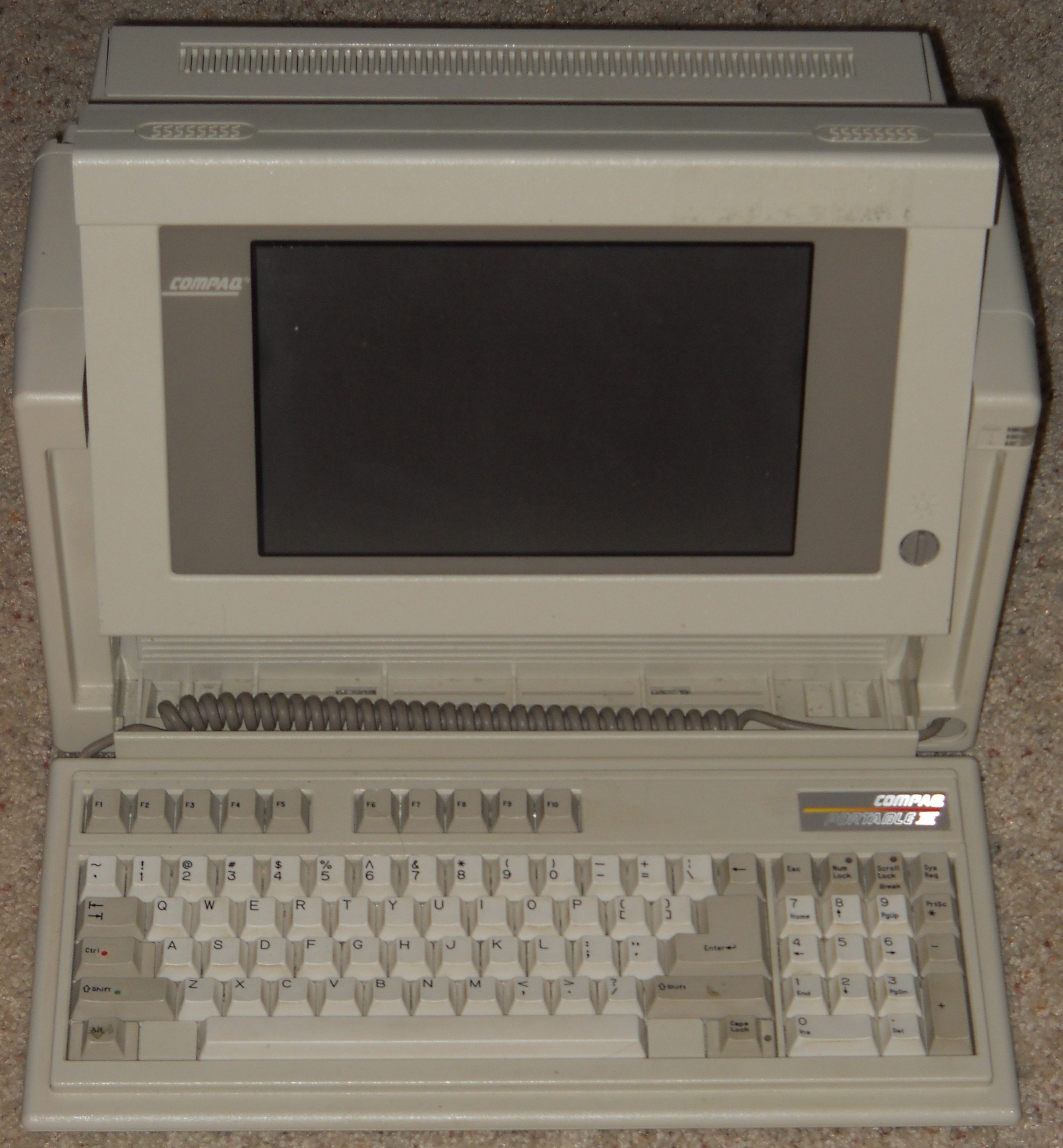
- Manufacturer: Compaq Computer Corporation, United States
- Type: Portable computer
- Released: 1987; 39 years ago
- Introductory price: US$3,999 (equivalent to $11,300 in 2025)
- Discontinued: 1995; 31 years ago
- Operating system: MS-DOS 3.1
- CPU: Intel 80286 @ 12 MHz, Intel 80287 (FPU) option
- Memory: 640 KB – 8192 KB
- Display: 10" amber gas-plasma display
- Graphics: 640 × 400 resolution, 80 × 25 text
- Sound: PIT using a mini speaker
- Connectivity: CGA, serial, parallel
- Dimensions: 41 (width) x 19.2 (depth) x 24.8 (height) cm (16.1 x 7.5 x 9.7 inches)
- Weight: 9.1 kg (20 lb)
- Predecessor: Compaq Portable II
- Successor: Compaq Portable 386

The Compaq Portable III (Model 2660) is a PC/AT-compatible computer released by Compaq Computer Corporation in 1987. It was advertised as being much smaller and lighter than the previous portable x86-PCs; however it was still quite large by today's standards. Three models were announced at release. The Model 1 had a list price of $3999 USD and was equipped with a 12 MHz Intel 80286, 640 KB of RAM, 1.2 MB 5.25" floppy drive, and a 10" amber colored gas-plasma display. Other models included the Model 20 at $4999 USD which added a 20 MB hard disk, or $5799 for the Model 40 with the upgraded 40 MB hard disk.

When Compaq launched its Portable III, the launch was timed to occur simultaneously in twelve countries around the world, in keeping with Compaq's showmanship style. The Portable III was designed to be the smallest, lightest and fastest 386 machine, since Compaq was under the pressure from Toshiba with its T1100 and T3100 and Zenith Data Systems with its Z-181. Compaq only had 286 motherboards ready for mass production, so the 386 version, the Compaq Portable 386, would follow about one year later.

The design of the Portable III had been deeply modified over the earlier Compaq portable series of machines. It was half the size and its footprint occupied half the space of the first Compaq Portable. The most remarkable feature was its gas plasma display which lifted up and swiveled so that it could be placed in a good position for reading. It also has a proprietary graphics mode that allows it to run at true 640 x 400 mode. Windows 2.11 had a Compaq Portable display driver for 640 x 400 mode.

The optional 80287 coprocessor ran at 8 MHz regardless of the speed of the 80286, and the 640 KB of RAM were made up of 100-ns 256K-bit chips. The Portable III lacked the internal expansion ports of previous Portables and desktop PCs of the time, but Compaq offered an optional external expansion unit (model 2662A), that provided two full length, 16-bit ISA add-in cards for $199. The external expansion unit was electrically connected to the computer by a 96-pin port. This unit was a more flexible option than the completely detached expansion units made for other portables. Because it gets its power from the computer via this port, it could be securely attached it to the Portable III, and carried as if it were part of the machine. More than one expansion unit could be configured for different needs, allowing it considerable versatility for its time. Power is supplied using a mains electricity outlet, it was not designed to run on batteries.

== See also ==
- Rabbit 286, a clone by Chicony Electronics
