= Compaq Portable 486 =

Portable computer by Compaq

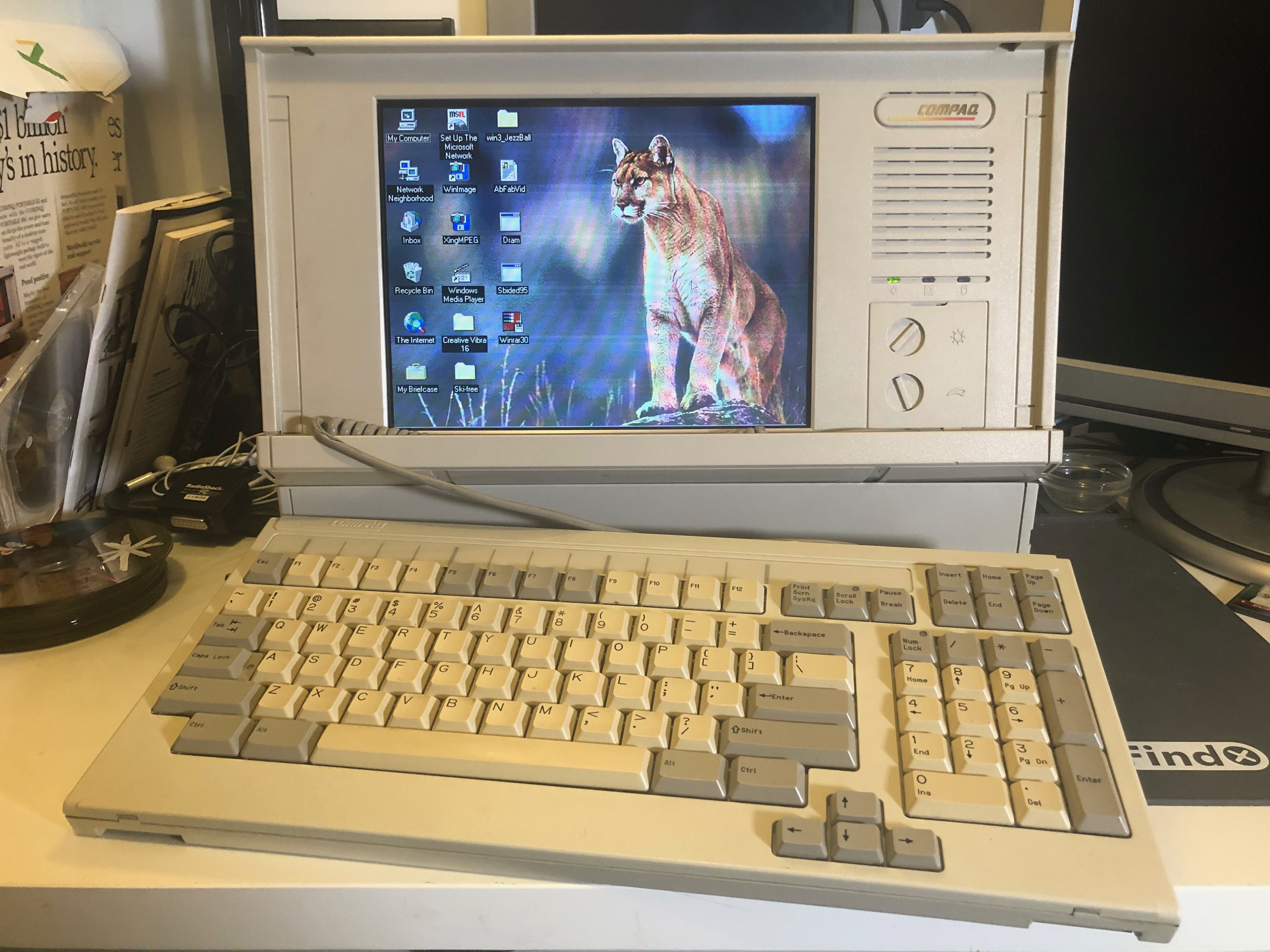
- Color version, the Compaq Portable 486c
- Manufacturer: Compaq Computer Corporation, United States
- Product family: Compaq Portable series
- Type: Portable computer
- Released: 1991; 35 years ago
- CPU: Intel 80486DX @ 33 MHz
- Memory: 4–32 MB RAM (72-pin SIMM)
- Display: Active TFT monochrome
- Graphics: 640 X 480 resolution 8-bit VGA, 80 X 25 text
- Sound: PIT using a mini speaker
- Connectivity: SCSI 2x EISA expansion bus
- Dimensions: 39.6 (width) × 13.9 (depth) × 27.9 (height) cm
- Weight: 7.9 kg (17 lb)
- Predecessor: Compaq Portable 386

The Compaq Portable 486 is a computer released by Compaq Computer Corporation in 1991. It was the last portable computer/"luggable" released under the Compaq Portable series of computers.

The computer was released in several models with different hard disk configurations and in two screen types, a cheaper monochrome version and a more expensive active matrix color version, known as the Compaq Portable 486c. The street price with a 120 MB hard disk was US$5,899 (equivalent to $13,900 in 2025) for the monochrome version and US$9,999 (equivalent to $23,600 in 2025) for the active matrix color version. For a model with a 210 MB hard disk, the price was US$6,899 for the monochrome version and US$10,999 for the active matrix color version, available after May 1992.

Both versions are equipped with a socketed 33 MHz Intel 80486DX CPU, 4 MB DRAM (72-pin SIMM), 1.44 MB 3.5" floppy, 120 - 1000 MB hard disk drive (P-ATA), and SCSI port for CD-ROM or tape. On the front of the unit there two dials underneath the PC-speaker to adjust the brightness of the screen and the volume of the PC-speaker. The PC-speaker in the Compaq Portable 486 is unique in that there is a 3.5 mm audio input jack on the side of the unit to allow a third party ISA sound card to pass through its audio output to the PC speaker.

Compaq released two versions of the Compaq Portable 486 with a faster, 66 MHz Intel 80486DX2 CPU, named the Compaq Portable 486/66 for the monochrome version and the Compaq Portable 486/66c for the color version.

Compaq worked with Network General which released branded versions of the Compaq Portable 486 as "Network Sniffers".

A case-modified version of the colour screen variant with replaced internals was used as a prop in the 1995 film Hackers. With its internals replaced by those of a Macintosh laptop, it served as the character Dade Murphy's (Aliases: Zero Cool and Crash Override) primary computer for the first half of the film.

Environmental limits are:

- Temperature operating 10–40 °C, nonoperating −30–60 °C
- Relative humidity (noncondensing) Operating 20%–80%, Nonoperating 5%–90%
- Maximum unpressurized altitude operating 3050 m, nonoperating 9150 m
- Shock 40 g, 11 ms, half sine (nonoperating Vibration, Operating 0.25 g, 5–500 Hz, 1/2 octave/min sweep Nonoperating 1.0 g, 5–500 Hz, 1/2 octave/min sweep
