= IBM Portable Personal Computer =

1984 computer developed by IBM

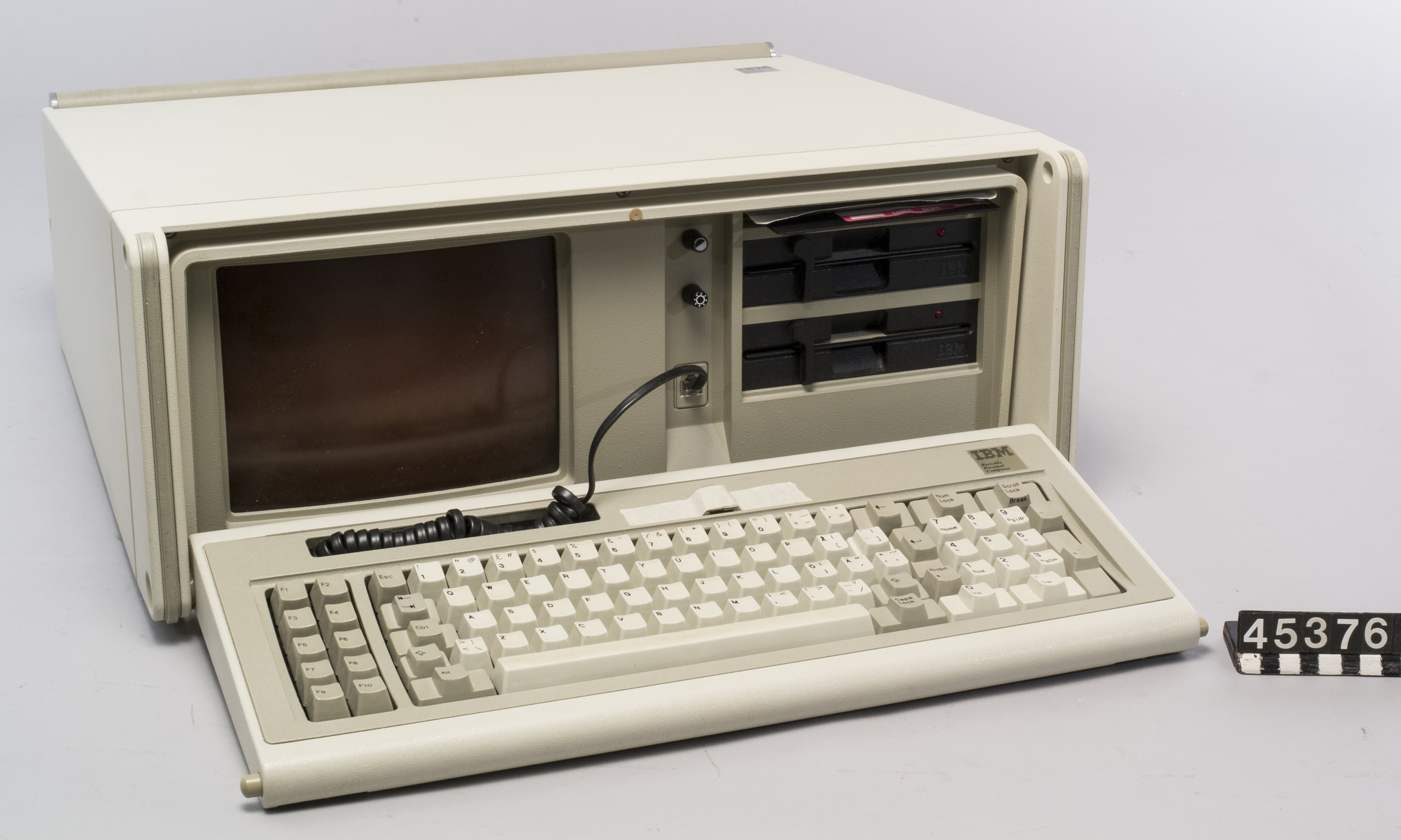
- An IBM Portable PC with two 5.25-inch floppy diskette drives installed
- Developer: IBM
- Type: Portable computer
- Released: February 1984; 42 years ago
- Introductory price: US$4,225 (equivalent to $13,090 in 2025)
- Discontinued: April 1986
- Operating system: IBM PC DOS Version 2.10 (disk)
- CPU: Intel 8088 @ 4.77 MHz
- Memory: 256 KB (expandable to 640 KB)
- Storage: One or two half-height 5 1/4-inch 360 KB floppy disk drives
- Display: CGA card connected to an internal 9-inch monochrome (amber) composite monitor
- Weight: 30 pounds (13.6 kg)
- Predecessor: IBM Personal Computer
- Successor: IBM PC Convertible

The IBM Portable Personal Computer (5155 model 68, often shortened to IBM Portable PC) is an early portable computer developed by IBM after the success of the suitcase-size Compaq Portable. It was released in February 1984 and was quickly replaced by the IBM Convertible, only roughly two years after its debut.

== Design ==
The Portable was basically a PC/XT motherboard, transplanted into a Compaq Portable-style luggable case. The system featured 256 kilobytes of memory (expandable to 640 KB), an added CGA card connected to an internal monochrome amber composite monitor, and one or two half-height 5 1/4-inch 360 KB floppy disk drives, manufactured by Qume. Unlike the Compaq Portable, which used a dual-mode monitor and special display card, IBM used a stock CGA card and a 9-inch amber monochrome composite monitor, which had lower resolution. It could, however, display color if connected to an external monitor or television. A separate 83-key keyboard and cable was provided, which uses a front panel mounted phone jack styled connector RJ11. The cable from the connector then went to the back of the machine, where the original XT keyboard jack was.

Experts stated that IBM developed the Portable in part because its sales force needed a computer that would compete against the Compaq Portable. Because it was based on the IBM PC XT, the IBM product is slightly less IBM compatible with the original IBM PC than the Compaq Portable. If less sophisticated than the Compaq, the IBM had the advantage of a lower price tag. The motherboard had eight expansion slots. The power supply was rated 114 watts and was suitable for operation on either 115 or 230 VAC. Hard disks were a very common third-party add-on as IBM did not offer them from the factory. Typically in a two-drive context, floppy drive A: ran the operating system, and drive B: would be used for application and data diskettes.

Its selling point as a "portable" was that it combined the monitor into a base unit approximating a medium-sized suitcase that could be simply set on its flat side, the back panel slid away to reveal the power connector, plugged in, the keyboard folded down or detached. At thirty pounds, it may have been difficult to carry for some, and was often referred to as "luggable".

== Timeline ==
Timeline of the IBM Personal Computer

Asterisk (*) denotes a model released in Japan only
