= Clean-room design =

Reverse-engineering without infringing copyright

Clean-room design (also known as the Chinese wall technique) is the method of copying a design by reverse engineering and then recreating it without infringing any of the copyrights associated with the original design. Clean-room design is useful as a defense against copyright infringement because it relies on independent creation. However, because independent invention is not a defense against patents, clean-room designs typically cannot be used to circumvent patent restrictions.

The term implies that the design team works in an environment that is "clean" or demonstrably uncontaminated by any knowledge of the proprietary techniques used by the competitor.

Typically, a clean-room design is done by having someone examine the system to be reimplemented and having this person write a specification. This specification is then reviewed by a lawyer to ensure that no copyrighted material is included. The specification is then implemented by a team with no connection to the original examiners.

== Examples ==
Phoenix Technologies and American Megatrends both sold their clean-room implementation of the IBM-compatible BIOS to various PC clone manufacturers.

Several other PC clone companies, including Corona Data Systems, Eagle Computer, and Handwell Corporation, were litigated by IBM for copyright infringement, and were forced to re-implement their BIOS in a way which did not infringe IBM's copyrights. The legal precedent for firmware being protected by copyright, however, hadn't been established until Apple Computer, Inc. v. Franklin Computer Corp., 714 F.2d 1240 (3rd Circuit Court 1983). The three settlements by IBM, and the legal clean-room PC BIOS designs of Compaq and Columbia Data Products, happened before Phoenix announced, in July 1984, that they were licensing their own BIOS code. Phoenix expressly emphasized the clean-room process through which their BIOS code had been written by a programmer who did not even have prior exposure to Intel microprocessors, himself having been a TMS9900 programmer beforehand. As late as the early 1990s, IBM was winning millions of dollars from settling BIOS copyright infringement lawsuits against some other PC clone manufacturers like Matsushita/Panasonic (1987) and Kyocera (1993–1994), although the latter suit was for infringements between 1985 and 1990.

Another clean-room design example is VTech's successful clones of the Apple II ROMs for the Laser 128, the only computer model, among dozens of Apple II compatibles, which survived litigation brought by Apple Computer. The "Laser 128 story" is in contrast to the Franklin Ace 1000, which lost in the 1983 decision, Apple Computer, Inc. v. Franklin Computer Corporation. The previous PC "clone" examples are notable for not daring to fight IBM in court, even before the legal precedent for copyrighting firmware had been made.

Other examples include ReactOS, an open-source operating system made from clean-room reverse-engineered components of Windows, ArtCraft, a suite of creative and office applications modeled after the Adobe Creative Cloud and Microsoft Office, and Coherent operating system, a clean-room re-implementation of version 7 Unix. In the early years of its existence, Coherent's developer Mark Williams Company received a visit from an AT&T delegation looking to determine whether MWC was infringing on AT&T Unix property. It has been released as open source.

== Case law ==
Clean-room design is usually employed as best practice, but not strictly required by law. In NEC Corp. v Intel Corp. (1990), NEC sought declaratory judgment against Intel's charges that NEC's engineers simply copied the microcode of the 8086 processor in their NEC V20 clone. A US judge ruled that while the early, internal revisions of NEC's microcode were indeed a copyright violation, the later one, which actually went into NEC's product, although derived from the former, were sufficiently different from the Intel microcode it could be considered free of copyright violations. While NEC themselves did not follow a strict clean-room approach in the development of their clone's microcode, during the trial, they hired an independent contractor who was only given access to specifications but ended up writing code that had certain similarities to both NEC's and Intel's code. From this evidence, the judge concluded that similarity in certain routines was a matter of functional constraints resulting from the compatibility requirements, and thus were likely free of a creative element. Although the clean-room approach had been used as preventative measure in view of possible litigation before (e.g. in the Phoenix BIOS case), the NEC v. Intel case was the first time that the clean-room argument was accepted in a US court trial. A related aspect worth mentioning here is that NEC did have a license for Intel's patents governing the 8086 processor.

Sony Computer Entertainment, Inc. v. Connectix Corp. was a 1999 lawsuit which established an important precedent in regard to reverse engineering. Sony sought damages for copyright infringement over Connectix's Virtual Game Station emulator, alleging that its proprietary BIOS code had been copied into Connectix's product without permission. Sony won the initial judgment, but the ruling was overturned on appeal. Sony eventually purchased the rights to Virtual Game Station to prevent its further sale and development. This established a precedent addressing the legal implications of commercial reverse engineering efforts.

During production, Connectix unsuccessfully attempted a Chinese wall approach to reverse engineer the BIOS, so its engineers disassembled the object code directly. Connectix's successful appeal maintained that the direct disassembly and observation of proprietary code was necessary because there was no other way to determine its behavior. From the ruling:

Some works are closer to the core of intended copyright protection than others. Sony's BIOS lay at a distance from the core because it contains unprotected aspects that cannot be examined without copying. The court of appeal therefore accorded it a lower degree of protection than more traditional literary works.

== In popular culture ==
- In the first season of the 2014 TV show Halt and Catch Fire, a key plot point from the second episode is how the fictional Cardiff Electric computer company placed an engineer in a clean room to implement a BIOS for its PC clone, to provide cover and protection from IBM lawsuits for a previous probably-illegal reverse engineering of the BIOS code others at the company had performed. It reminded many critics of Compaq's million dollar clean-room engineering, but a contemporary, but far less successful company, Columbia Data Products, also used such an approach. The reaction of IBM's legal department, like other plot points, echoed the experiences of Corona Data Systems more closely.

== See also ==
- Code morphing
