= Compaq Portable 386 =

1987 computer by Compaq

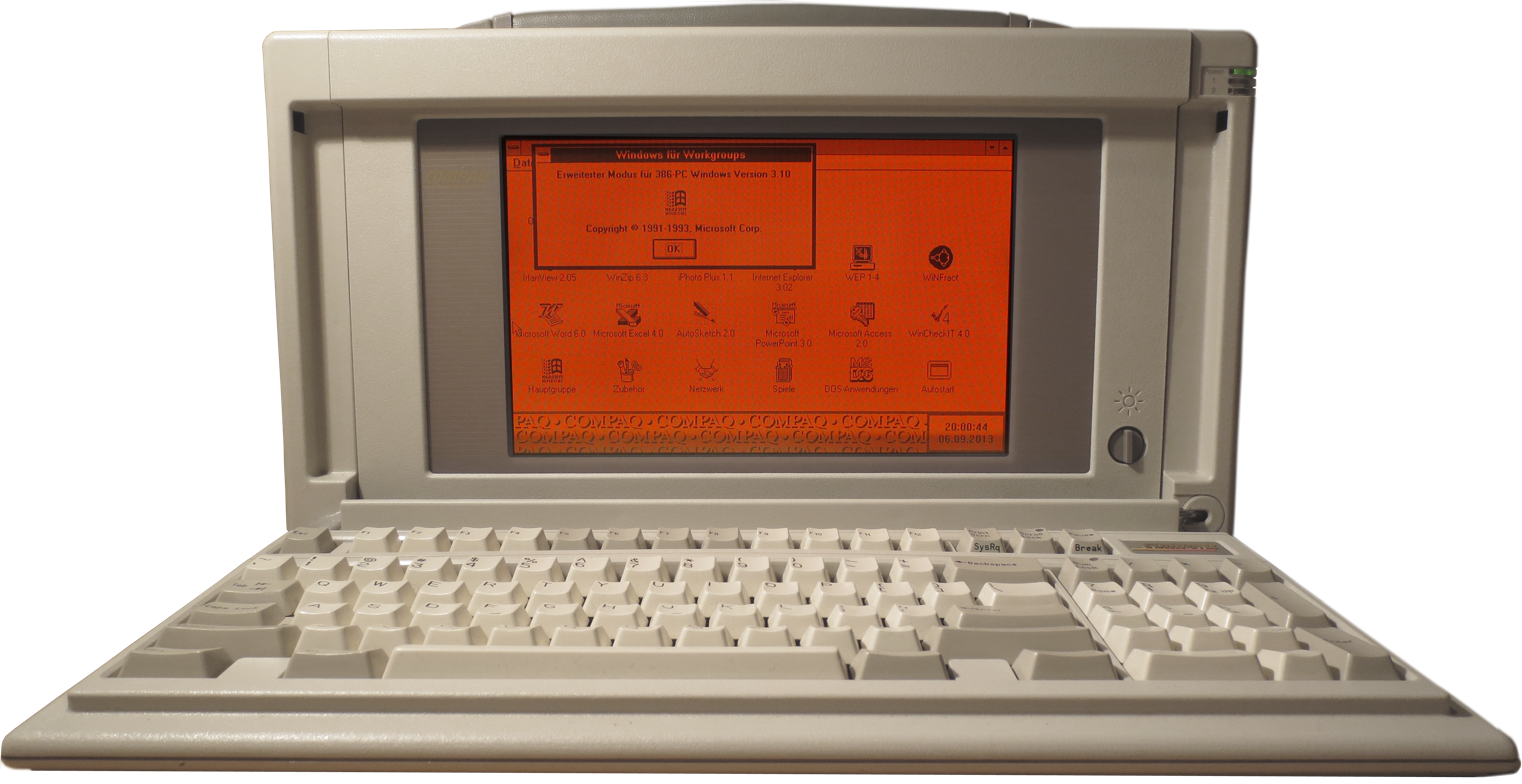
- Manufacturer: Compaq Computer Corporation, United States
- Type: Portable computer
- Released: October 1987; 38 years ago
- Introductory price: US$7,999 (equivalent to $22,700 in 2025)
- Operating system: MS-DOS 3.3, upgradable to 6.1. Also supports Windows 3.1.
- CPU: Intel 80386 @ 20 MHz, Intel 80387 (FPU) option
- Memory: 1–10 MB RAM
- Storage: 1.2 MB 5¼-inch floppy 40 or 100 MB hard disk drive
- Display: 10" amber gas-plasma display
- Graphics: 640 × 400 resolution CGA, 80/40 × 25 text
- Sound: PIT using a mini speaker
- Connectivity: CGA, serial, parallel, PCMCIA, ISA expansion bus
- Dimensions: 41 (width) × 19.2 (depth) × 24.8 (height) cm (16.1 × 7.5 × 9.7 inches)
- Weight: 11 kg (24 lb)
- Predecessor: Compaq Portable III
- Successor: Compaq Portable 486

The Compaq Portable 386 is a computer released by Compaq Computer Corporation in 1987. It was equipped with a 20 MHz Intel 80386 CPU, 1 MB RAM, 16 KB ROM, 1.2 MB 5¼-inch floppy, 40 or 100 MB hard disk drive, priced at US$7,999 or 9,999 respectively, and a 10" amber gas-plasma display.

Early versions of the Compaq Portable 386 were sold with the Compaq Portable III case and badges. A differing screen bezel stating "386/20" was the only externally visible change.

Network General resold a customized version of the Compaq Portable 386 as the "Sniffer" Network Analyzer.

== Technical data in detail ==
=== CPU and FPU ===
The Portable 386 got its name due to the socketed Intel 386DX CPU with 20 MHz. There is also an additional socket for a 20 MHz 387 FPU option, which was not included in the basic configuration of the Portable. Since the whole system bus runs with CPU frequency, there is no way to improve the CPU performance by installing a 386DX CPU with more than 20 MHz other than the rare Cyrix 486DRx2 20/40 which has a multiplicator of 2 for the frequency while being still pinout compatible with the 386 socket.

=== Memory ===
The mainboard can take up to four proprietary 512KB SIMMs which were called SC-RAM in the Portable manual. Additionally, there was an expansion slot inside the Portable which allowed to expand the memory by another 8MB alongside the 2MB on the mainboard by:

Installing the so-called 32bit Memory-/Modem board expansion offers a socket for another expansion card which has 4MB (8×512 KB 80 ns) of memory and another expansion socket installed on which the user can install a 3rd expansion card with another 4MB (again 8×512 KB 80 ns) of RAM. These RAM expansion cards were available through Compaq or third-party manufacturers, such as Kingston Technology.

=== Graphics card ===
The graphics card can be configured between CGA and MDA emulation mode whereas the CGA mode is mandatory for using Microsoft Windows' Compaq Plasma Driver and graphic capabilities in general. The internal CGA graphics card is able to display a resolution up to 640x400 pixels with a color depth of 2 bits (monochrome), which was first seen in the AT&T 6300 built by Olivetti, surpassing the original IBM standard by 200 pixels in height while remaining fully CGA compatible elsewhere.

The internal gas plasma display is able to display 640x400 pixels with up to 16 shades of gray and is connected to the graphics card via a proprietary connector. Users can install a better graphics card via the Compaq Expansion Unit (See below), but the factory-installed monitor was unable to take advantage of it.

=== Hard disk ===
The Portable offers two drive bays for 5.25" half-height drives where one is reserved for the hard disk and the other one for the internal floppy disk drive. Compaq originally offered a 40MB and 100MB hard disk option. Quite common back in the days, the BIOS of the Compaq only offers to select preconfigured hard disk configurations like Type 17 for 40MB or 42 for 504MB. There is no detailed information about the underlying CHS configuration of these types, but some basic information on the drive numbers and their specs is available (See table). The device suffers from the widespread CHS barrier, not allowing hard disk drives greater than 504MB.

COMPAQ PORTABLE 386 HARD DRIVE TYPES

Type  Cyl.    Head    Sect.  Write    Land
                              p-comp   Zone
 ------------------------------------------
  1     306     4      17      128      305
  2     615     4      17      128      638
  3     615     6      17      128      615
  4    1024     8      17      512     1023
  5     940     6      17      512      939
  6     697     5      17      128      696
  7     462     8      17      256      511
  8     925     5      17      128      924
  9     900    15      17       -1      899
 10     980     5      17       -1      980
 11     925     7      17      128      924
 12     925     9      17      128      924
 13     612     8      17      256      611
 14     980     4      17      128      980
 15—reserved—16     612     4      17        0      612
 17     980     5      17      128      980
 18     966     6      17      128      966
 19    1023     8      17       -1     1023
 20     733     5      17      256      732
 21     733     7      17      256      732
 22     805     6      17       -1      805
 23     924     8      17       -1      924
 24     966    14      17       -1      966
 25     966    16      17       -1      966
 26    1023    14      17       -1     1023
 27     966    10      17       -1      966
 28     748    16      17       -1      748
 29     805     6      26       -1      805
 30     615     4      25      128      615
 31     615     8      25      128      615
 32     905     9      25      128      905
 33     748     8      34       -1      748
 34     966     7      34       -1      966
 35     966     8      34       -1      966
 36     966     9      34       -1      966
 37     966     5      34       -1      966
 38     611    16      63       -1      611
 39    1023    11      33       -1     1023
 40    1023    15      34       -1     1023
 41    1023    15      33       -1     1023
 42    1023    16      63       -1     1023
 43     805     4      26       -1      805
 44     805     2      26       -1      805
 45     748     8      33       -1      748
 46     748     6      33       -1      748
 47     966     5      25      128      966

=== Floppy Disk Drive ===
In its basic configuration, Compaq offered only a single 5.25" 1.2MB floppy disk drive aside of the 40MB hard disk drive, but there was also a cheaper option for a secondary 5.25" 360KB floppy disk drive instead of the hard disk. Giving the fact that the Portable uses a standard floppy drive connector and has built-in support in the BIOS, one can easily replace the 5.25" with a 3.5" 1.44MB drive.

=== External expansion options ===
In order to better position the Portable as a professional office computer, Compaq also offered multiple external expansion which can be installed on the back of the Portable while the device is turned off.

Compaq Expansion Unit
As mentioned before, there is an expansion unit available which extends the Portable by two full-size 16bit ISA slots. Compaq advertised ISA cards like the COMPAQ-VG-Controller card to be used with the expansion unit. This card allows to display (for back-then standards) groundbreaking 720×400 pixels for text and 640×480 pixels for graphics with up to 256 colors (palette of 256.000 colors) at the same time on an external Compaq VG display.
Compaq Expansion Unit with a 40MB tape drive
There was also an expansion unit for a 40MB tape drive offered, which looks identical to the ISA expansion unit from outside, except for offering only a slot for the tape drive.

=== Internal expansion options ===
Compaq offered multiple expansion cards for the Portable 386, which can be installed inside the main housing. Similar to the external expansions, these internal expansion cards cannot be exchanged while the device is turned on.

32bit Memory-/Modem board expansion (carrier board)
This expansion card is mandatory for installing additional expansion cards. It is not only a carrier board for other expansions, but also offers a 2400 baud modem.
1-2MB memory expansion
The 1-2MB memory expansion must be installed on the 32bit carrier board and comes with 1MB of RAM preinstalled and offers two more SC-RAM slots for 1MB SC-RAM memory modules each. It cannot be used together with the other 4MB memory expansions due to a missing connector.
4MB memory expansion
This expansion also requires the carrier board to be installed and offers 4MB of preinstalled memory.
4MB additional memory expansion
This extension board for the 4MB memory expansion card just offers another 4MB of preinstalled memory and is installed on top of the 4MB memory expansion. It maxes out the supported memory of 10MB.
Asynchronous connection extension
This expansion card offers only an RS232 connector. It cannot be used together with the carrier board.
1200 resp. 2400 Baud Modem
This expansion was only available in form of a set including a 1200 or 2400 baud Hayes-compatible modem, an own carrier board, a housing cover with a modem connector and a telephone cable for the American and Canadian markets.

== BIOS ==
The BIOS setup utility is not preinstalled in an EPROM chip, but comes on a single floppy disk. If needed, an archived disk image can found at archive.org/details/CompaqPortableDiagnosticDisk

- 3.5" 720 KB version: SP0308.EXE / SP0308.ZIP
- 5.25" 360 KB version: SP0316.EXE / SP0316.ZIP

== Software ==
Compaq bundled Compaq DOS in version 3.31 with the Portable 386, a variant of MS-DOS 3.2 which already offered support for FAT16 and hard disk partitions with more than 32 MB. A Windows 2.01 OEM version was also available which makes use of the 386 memory management. There was also a User Programs disk bundled with the Portable which offers tools for memory management and adapting the CPU speed (between 6, 8 and 20 MHz):

- ADAPT.COM (Advanced Display Attribute Programming Tool), a TSR application to configure the CGA/MDA charsets on the fly
- CACHE.EXE (Compaq Disk Cache) works similarly to the commonly known SmartDrive in later MS-DOS versions.
- CEMM.EXE (386 CPU) / CEMMP.EXE (286 CPU), Compaq Expanded Memory Manager, a memory manager which is incompatible with Windows 3.x
- CHARSET.COM installs an alternative character set and font (called THINUS) to improve the text display on the internal gas plasma display.
- CLOCK.SYS, a driver for the real time clock of the Portable 386
- MODE.COM replaces the default MODE.COM application of MS-DOS and allows additional commands like "MODE SEL MDA", "MODE SEL CGA", "MODE SPEED HIGH", "MODE SPEED LOW" to switch between the Portable 386's graphics and CPU frequency modes.
- VDISK.SYS is a virtual disk driver which makes use of the RAM.
