= Hyperion (computer) =

Early portable computer

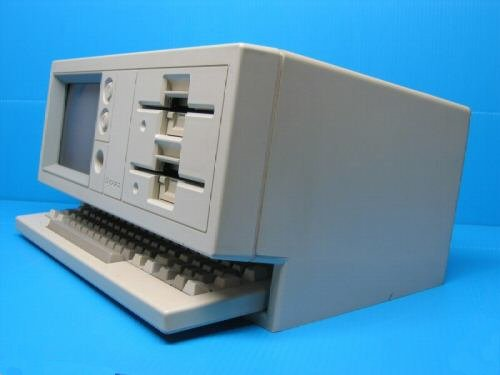
- Hyperion PC
- Developer: Dynalogic Corporation
- Manufacturer: Dynalogic Corporation
- Type: Portable computer
- Released: January 1983; 43 years ago
- Introductory price: CA$4,995 (equivalent to $14,100 in 2025)
- Discontinued: Approximately 1985
- Operating system: H-DOS
- CPU: Intel 8088 @ 4.77MHz
- Memory: 256 KB RAM
- Storage: 2 x 360 KB 5.25" floppy disk drives
- Display: built-in 7-inch amber CRT
- Graphics: CGA and HGC compatible
- Weight: 18 pounds (8.2 kg)

The Hyperion is an early portable computer that vied with the Compaq Portable to be the first portable IBM PC compatible. It was marketed by Infotech Cie of Ottawa, a subsidiary of Bytec Management Corp., who acquired the designer and manufacturer Dynalogic Corporation, in January 1983. In 1984, the design was licensed by Commodore International in a move that was forecast as a "radical shift of position" and a signal that Commodore would soon dominate the PC compatible market. Despite computers being "hand-assembled from kits" provided by Bytec and displayed alongside the Commodore 900 at a German trade show as their forthcoming first portable computer, it was never sold by Commodore and some analysts downplayed the pact. The Hyperion was shipped in January 1983 at C$4995, two months ahead of the Compaq Portable.

== Brand name ==
The name "Hyperion" was invented by Taylor-Sprules Corporation in Toronto. They also designed the retail packaging, all marketing materials and the tradeshow exhibit at Comdex in Atlantic City where Hyperion was first introduced in 1982. Two prototypes were shown. The amber graphics screens, and a built-in modem, were notable features that attracted comment at the show.

== Design ==
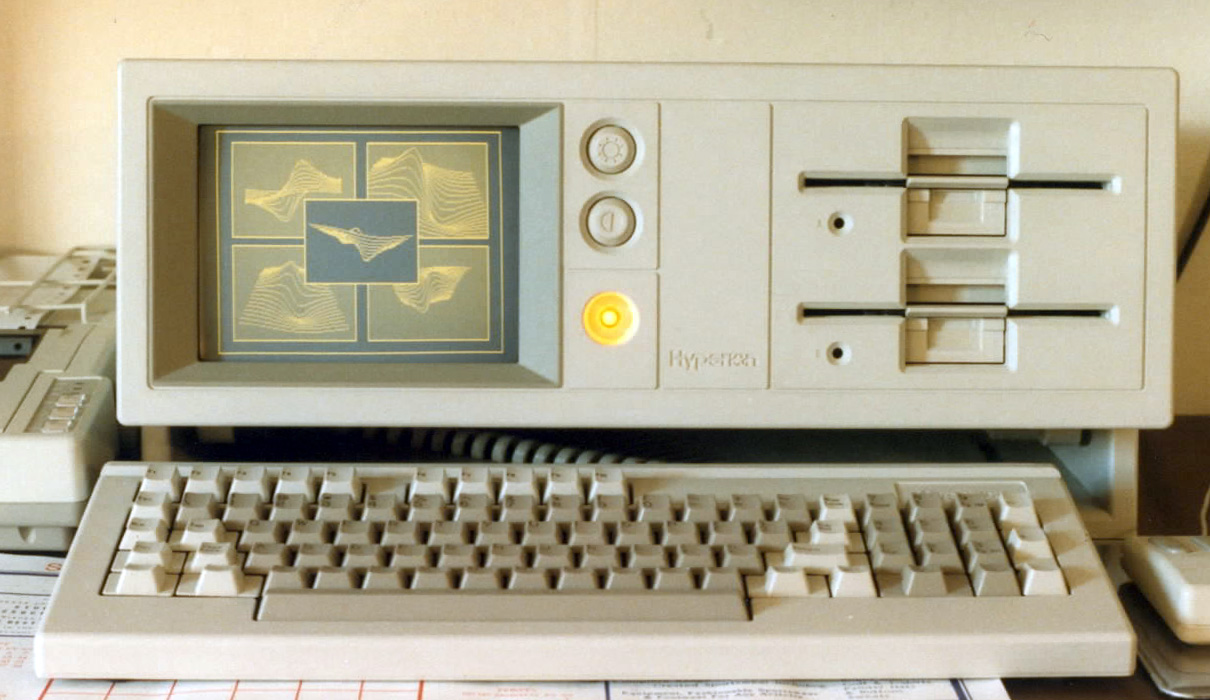
Hyperion (front)

The machine featured 256 KB RAM, dual 360 KB 5.25" floppy disk drives, a graphics card compatible with both CGA and HGC, a video-out jack, a built-in 7-inch amber CRT, 300-bit/s modem, and an acoustic coupler. It included a version of MS-DOS called H-DOS and bundled word processor, database, and modem software. While the Hyperion weighed just eighteen pounds (8.2 kg), or about 2/3 the weight of the Compaq, it was not as reliable or as IBM compatible and was discontinued within two years. One significant difference from the IBM system was the use of a Zilog Z80-SIO chip instead of a National Semiconductor 8250 for serial communications.

== Interface ==
The F1 through F5 keys beneath the 7" screen corresponded to five menu items displayed at the bottom of the screen. This menu was context sensitive and greatly facilitated entering DOS commands. All but the least frequently used commands were available as F-key menu selections greatly reducing the amount of typing required.. This user interface was comparable to the many DOS shell programs available at the time with the addition of soft keys in an effort to streamline the user experience.

The soft keys were also used in the word processor, database, and modem software that came bundled with the Hyperion, where they were used to select application commands from context-sensitive menus..

== Demise ==
The initial interest in the Hyperion was high. An order backlog worth US$25 million had built up, and plans were made to manufacture most units in the United States. However, incompatibility with the IBM PC was a concern for buyers, since many programs of the time made direct calls to the system ROM, and the video display and serial port used different integrated circuits than the IBM PC. The Dynalogic company was absorbed by Bytec in early 1983. Bytec in turn was merged into Comterm in later 1983. Faulty disk drives created warranty claims for computers built at the Huntsville, Alabama plant. The computer was withdrawn from marketing in late 1984, at a loss of $48 million to the company.
