= Seequa Chameleon =

Early portable computer

- Seequa Chameleon at VCF MW 2026
- Developer: Robert Mix and David Jenkins
- Manufacturer: Seequa Computer Corporation
- Product family: Seequa Chameleon series
- Type: Portable computer
- Released: April 1983; 43 years ago
- Introductory price: US$1,995 (equivalent to $6,450 in 2025)
- Operating system: MS-DOS
- CPU: Intel 8088, 4.77 MHz & Zilog Z80, 4MHz
- Memory: 128 KB (expandable to 256 KB without an expansion chassis)
- Storage: Two 5.25" floppy disk drives at 160K single sided double density, later being offered with a singular double sided double density 320K disk drive with an optional second drive available
- Display: Built-in 9" green screen monitor
- Graphics: Unique CGA-compatible
- Weight: 28 lb (13 kg)
- Backward compatibility: IBM PC compatible & CP/M compatible
- Successor: Seequa Chameleon Plus

The Seequa Chameleon was an early 1980s luggable personal computer released by the Seequa Computer Corporation in 1983. It was capable of running both the MS-DOS and CP/M operating systems. It did so by having both Zilog Z80 and Intel 8088 microprocessors. The Chameleon was able to run nearly every IBM "booter" game at launch, including Sublogic's Flight Simulator, and was guaranteed compatible with any existing CP/M software.

One of the selling points of the Chameleon was the fact the unit came with everything it needed to operate right outside of the box. The custom CGA card and floppy drive controller were built directly into the main logic board, meaning that all that was needed for operation was to plug in a power cable. Seequa opted to not include expansion slots because of this decision, locking the Chameleon at a maximum 256K onboard until the release of the internal RAM Plus card upgrade in 1985. The Chameleon also utilized a TUI for hardware configuration management within MS-DOS that could be saved to an EEROM for persistent store/recall of user defined configurations.

Seequa Computer Corporation was founded in Annapolis, Maryland in 1980 as Computer Corporation of America (renamed to Seequa in 1981 after Massachusetts-based Computer Corporation of America requested the name to be changed), and moved to a larger manufacturing facility in Odenton, Maryland in 1984. It was founded by David Gardner (President) and Dave Egli (CEO), one of David's business professors at the University of Maryland. Seequa was the child company of Computers, Etc., a Maryland-based computer retail storefront also founded by Gardner and Egli. Seequa operated from 1981-1985, producing six computer models (Chameleon, Chameleon Plus, PC, XT, Color Chameleon, Chameleon XL) before filing for bankruptcy in October 1985.

== See also ==
- Tabor Drivette - a non-standard 3.25-inch diskette drive used in the limited production Seequa 325 portable
