= Zorba =

Zorba (Greek: Ζορμπά) may refer to:

== Arts and entertainment ==
- Zorba (comics), a fictional character from Marvel Comics
- Zorba the Greek, a 1946 novel by the Greek author Nikos Kazantzakis
  - Syrtaki, a Greek dance commonly called the Zorba
  - Zorba the Greek (film), a 1964 movie based on the novel
  - Zorba (musical), a musical based on the novel and film
  - "Zorba's Dance", a song by Mikis Theodorakis featured in the film
- Zorba the Hutt, a Star Wars Legends character
- The Zorba family, main characters from the 1960 horror film 13 Ghosts
- Zorba (music group), a psy-trance side project of GMS

== Other uses ==
- Zorba the Buddha, a Rajneesh concept owing in part to the Kazantzakis novel character
- Zorba (Mastiff), world's largest dog, now deceased
- Zorba Paster, physician and public radio personality
- Zorba (XQuery processor), an open source implementation of the XQuery query/programming language
- Süleyman Zorba (born 1995), Turkish-born Austrian politician
- Sorik, a town in Armenia formerly called Zorba
- A nickname of Peter Metropolis (born 1944), an Australian rules football player and administrator
- Zorba (computer), a 1983 CP/M-based portable computer
- Zorba (scrap), the collective term for shredded and pre-treated non-ferrous scrap metals
