= Actrix =

Actrix is an archaic synonym for actress. It may also mean:

- Actrix (computer), a personal computer
- Actrix (moth), a genus of moths
