= Actrix (computer) =

Early personal computer

Actrix computer
- Developer: Actrix Computer Corporation
- Type: transportable personal computer
- Released: 1983; 43 years ago
- Introductory price: US$2,495 (equivalent to $8,065 in 2025)
- Operating system: CP/M-80 V2.2
- CPU: NEC D780C-1 @ 4 MHz

The Actrix computer, released in 1983 by Actrix Computer Corporation, was a Zilog Z80-based transportable personal computer running CP/M-80 V2.2. It was initially released as the Access Computer, made by Access Matrix Computer Corporation (later Actrix Computer Corporation), but both the company and its product changed names after trademark disputes.

== Access Computer ==
Access Computer was the common name for the Access Matrix, a transportable personal computer introduced in 1982 by a United States computer company, Access Matrix Corp (AM CORP on FCC documentation). The company was owned by Porter Hurt, a Silicon Valley based American entrepreneur. Mr. Hurt appeared on Good Morning America to demonstrate the computer.

=== Hardware ===
The Access Computer had dual 5.25-inch floppy drives (either 320k-DS or 168k-SS) a detachable keyboard, a 7" built-in amber CRT display, and a built-in 80 CPS Epson MX80 dot matrix printer with GRAFTRAX-80 chipset. It used the CP/M operating system, and also included a Bell-103 300 baud modem with both acoustic-coupled and direct connections. Additional connectors for IEEE-488 (external hard disk), composite monitor, RS-232 serial and Centronics parallel were provided. The mainboard has a 50-pin header designed to support 8-inch disk drives (4 heads on two double-sided disks - drive letters C:/D: and E:/F:)

=== Software ===
Access Matrix came bundled with MBASIC, CBASIC, the Perfect-series office software, Personal Pearl database and Fancy Font markup/formatting system. Custom-written software included a disk format/verify/duplication utility (DISKU.COM) that worked with both the internal A:/B: drives as well as optional external 8" disks (C:/D: and E:/F:). A custom-written Telecommunications utility (TELCOMU.COM) offered dialup address book, basic terminal emulation, XMODEM/Modem7 file transfer and other features for connection to BBS and other online systems or to operate as a drone to receive files uploaded from other computers.

=== Market ===
Although not truly portable the all-in-one design did allow for quick setup and shut-down. It was rugged and although weighing 15 kg, it was reasonably easy to transport in a car or in an aircraft's coat- locker. The Access Matrix had option of a padded cloth bag with shoulder-strap or a heavier-duty leather/cloth bound protective case with carry handle and shoulder-strap.

Apparently the system was popular with journalists who could use the inbuilt "OFFLINE" type-writer mode to create and print simple ad hoc single-page documents ready for immediate faxing to HQ from their hotel lobby. Another option was to combine the word processing and telecommunications features to create a document using the word processing software and immediately upload the document directly to either an online service such as CompuServe or indeed to another 'waiting' Access Matrix at their head office.

== Actrix computer ==
The rebadged Actrix DS was presented at the Las Vegas Comdex in November 1983. There was another model called the Actrix SS with a 170k 5.25-inch disk drive.

=== Specifications ===
Hardware:

- NEC D780C-1 (clone of Zilog Z80B) CPU @ 4 MHz
- 64 KB RAM
- Two 320 KB DS-DD floppy disk drives (Actrix-DS model)
- or Two 170 KB SS-DD floppy disk drives (Actrix-SS model)
- 7" amber CRT display
- Epson MX-80 dot-matrix printer with GRAFTRAX-80 chipset
- Bell 103 modem and acoustic coupler
- Detachable keyboard

==== Options ====
The void to the right of the two floppy drives could either be open, for convenient storage of a handful of floppy diskettes, or blanked to conceal one of two options:

- Intel 8088 co-processor board with 256 KB RAM and MS-DOS 1.25
- Internal uninterruptible power supply (UPS)

Another option was a 50-pin connector at the rear of the void, for 8" disk drives

If either UPS or 8088 options were present the rear or the void was blanked off with a screw-on plate. If the 50-pin 8" disk cable option is present the rear of the void is changed to a clip-on panel securing the 50-pin cable connector. If no options were fitted the rear of the floppy void was a blank clip-on panel. If only the 50-pin option is present the floppy void was modified internally with a plastic jacket to prevent stored diskettes from interfering with the rear of the 50-pin header/cable assembly

==== Connectors ====
- keyboard
- 2 X D25F RS-232 serial (AUX terminal/console or printer)
- 1 X Centronics parallel port (printer)
- 1 x IEEE-488 / GP-IB (hard disk)
- 1 x composite video (larger/second monitor)
- 50-pin header on mainboard to optional external 50-pin male IDC connector for external 8" disk drives
- IEC power (115 V/220 V dealer-switchable)

==== Disk assignments ====
- A: first 5.25" floppy to load OS
- B: 'other' 5.25" floppy
- C: first side of first 8" disk
- D: second side of first 8" disk
- E: first side of second 8" disk
- F: second side of second 8" disk
- M: 256 kB RAM disk utilising 256 kB RAM from the 8088 co-processor

==== Software ====
- Digital Research CP/M-80 2.2 operating system
- Microsoft MS-DOS 1.25 (only with optional 8088 co-processor board)
- M: Drive utility (to utilise 256KB RAM on optional 8088 co-pro board as M: RAM disk under CP/M)
- Personal Pearl database system
- FancyFont text markup and layout software
- Perfect Series office suite (Filer (database), Calc (spreadsheet), Writer (word processor))
- Digital Research CBASIC compiler
- Microsoft MBASIC interpreter

==== Included bespoke utilities ====
- TELCOMU – comms software with phonebook, modem dialing and X-modem file transfer capabilities, useful for connecting to online services such as CompuServe and RCP/M BBS systems. Also TELCOM and TELCOM+ variants (1.05/1.16/x.yy)
- DISKU – utility for copying, duplicating, formatting and verifying 5.25" and 8" floppy disks (2.26)
- CONFIGU – allowed customisation of various attributes such as monitor, cursor, printer, console redirection, RS-232 and Centronics parameters. Once customised settings were saved and could be reloaded manually or used by the WAKEUP program to allow customisations to be set at boot time (1.03)
- WAKEUP – used at boot to set date and time and apply configuration profiles created using CONFIGU (1.03)
- AMD – Set CP/M to use the 256KB RAM of optional 8088 co-processor board as M: 'ram-drive'
- INSTALL – Actrix auto-command installation utility - allowed specification of a .COM file to auto-execute at cold-boot time (1.00)
- DAC-DS – Dealer Acceptance Test – a diagnostic utility for dealers to quickly tests memory/clock, floppy disk, video, printer and keyboard (1.01)

== International distribution ==
In Australia, one official distributor of the Actrix Computer range was Richard Carpenter, based in Little Mountain, Queensland. It is believed that Carpenter imported two or three Access Computers as sales tools and demonstrators, but shipped less than a dozen Actrix Computers. In 1986, two demonstrator Actrix machines were repossessed by the financier, NatWest Australia Bank.

== Failure ==
Expensive TV advertising and constant lawsuits concerning the product and company-naming rights were drains on capital that speeded the decline and ultimate stop of sales of Actrix machines. Existing orders were filled by one remaining technician, who built the last remaining machines from spare parts.
