= Portable computer =

Lightweight, compact computer with built-in peripherals

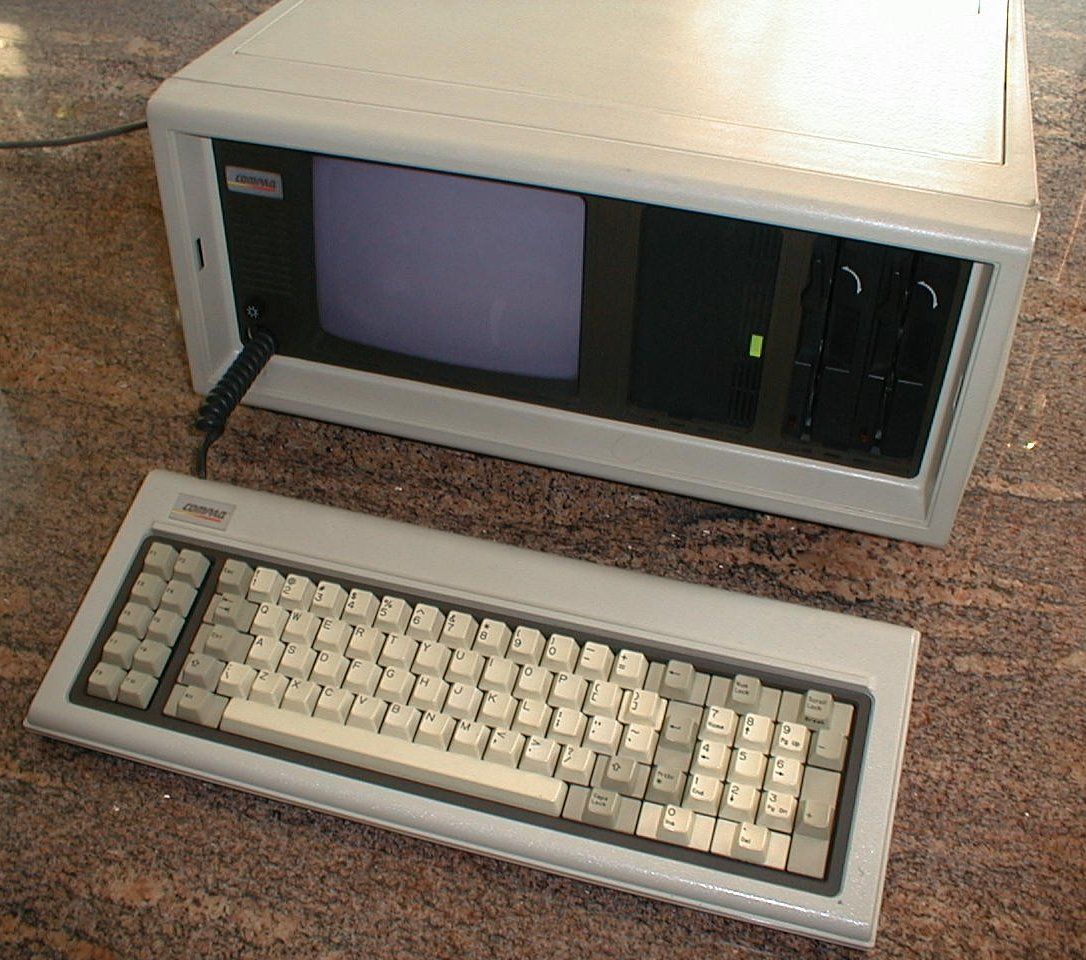
The Compaq Portable, one of the first IBM PC compatible system

A portable computer is a computer designed to be easily moved from one place to another, as opposed to those designed to remain stationary at a single location such as desktops and workstations. These computers usually include a display and keyboard that are directly connected to the main case, all sharing a single power plug together, much like later desktop computers called all-in-ones (AIO) that integrate the system's internal components into the same case as the display. In modern usage, a portable computer usually refers to a very light and compact personal computer such as a laptop, subnotebook or handheld PC, while touchscreen-based handheld ("palmtop") devices such as tablets, phablets and smartphones are called mobile devices instead.

Early major portables included the 50-pound (23 kg) IBM 5100 (1975), Osborne's 24-pound (11 kg) CP/M-based Osborne 1 (1981) and Compaq's 28-pound (13 kg), advertised as 100% IBM PC compatible Compaq Portable (1983). These luggable computers still required a continuous connection to an external power source; Laptop computers later overcame this limitation. Laptops were followed by lighter models such as netbooks, so that in the 2000s mobile devices and by 2007 smartphones made the term portable rather meaningless. The 2010s introduced wearable computers such as smartwatches.

Portable computers, more narrowly defined, are distinct from desktop replacement computers in that they usually were constructed from full-specification desktop components, and often do not incorporate features associated with laptops or mobile devices. A portable computer in this usage, versus a laptop or other mobile computing device, has a standard motherboard or backplane providing plug-in slots for add-in cards. This allows mission-specific cards, such as test, A/D, or communication protocol (IEEE-488, 1553) to be installed. Portable computers also provide for more disk storage by using standard disk drives and provide for multiple drives.

== Early history ==
=== Berkeley's Simon ===
The Simon, developed by Edmund Berkeley with help from a young Ivan Sutherland, was the first digital computer kit introduced to the public in 1951. Between 1949 and 1951, a series of instruction guides published in Radio-Electronics guided the reader in building a Simon at home for about $300, or about $3,810 in 2026. Despite an intention for portability, with assembly instructions suggesting the addition of a handle, the computer used electromechanical relays, and therefore was not an electronic computer in the modern sense.

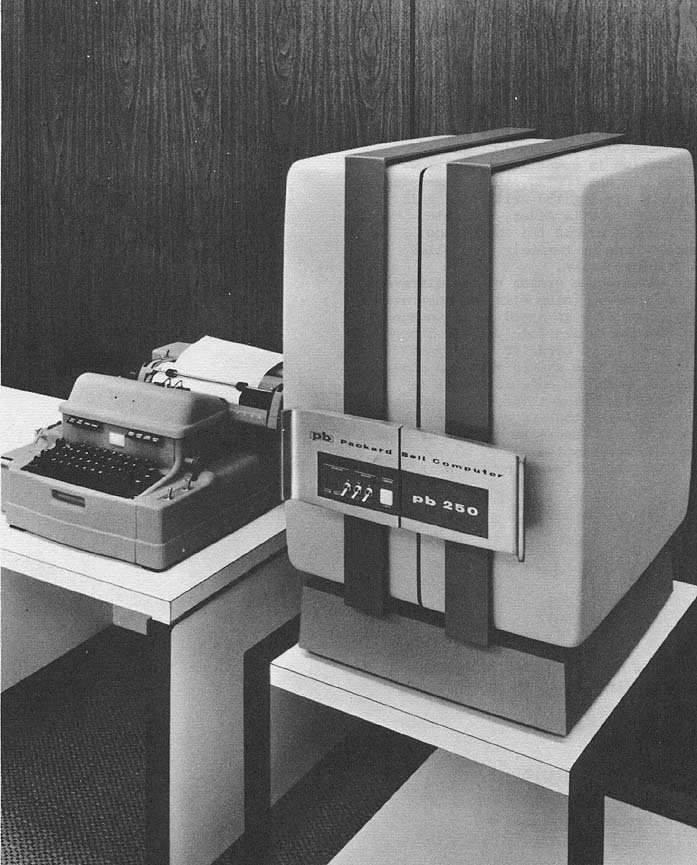
A 1960 PB-250 computer in a standalone desktop configuration.

=== Packard-Bell PB-250 ===
The Packard Bell PB-250 was a very early minicomputer, with the ability to fit on top of a desk and similar dimensions to the 1965 DEC PDP-8, despite preceding the PDP-8 to the commercial market by 5 years. Often used for engineering work and industrial control systems, a pioneering feature of the PB-250 was its ability to run entirely off batteries for several hours, considered a first in the computer industry at the time. The PB-250 was also one of the lightest computers of the early 1960s, weighing in at only 110 pounds, less than half of the PDP-8's weight. By 1962, several van services had been established to provide mobile industrial control and quality assurance, using a PB-250 and accompanying analog computer, as well as various paper tape and punch inputs, to form an entirely functional, and rather mobile multi-purpose computer system in the back of a small van. A July 1962 article claimed that: "Even when the van is moving, the computer can be operated from a standard battery at peak performance."

=== Semiconductor Network Computer ===
A very early experimental transistorized system, termed the Semiconductor Network Computer, was developed at Texas Instruments for use by the United States Air Force in the early 1960s. By 1961, they had shrunk down an entire digital computer to the size of a 10-oz, 6.3-in^{3} palm-sized package. However, this did not include any form of storage or I/O, and was intended for very specific military aerospace applications.

=== Hewlett-Packard 9830A ===
One of the earliest contenders for a portable computer in the modern sense is Hewlett Packard's HP-9830A series of systems, introduced in late 1972. Despite often being referred to as "calculators," the December 1972 issue of the Hewlett Packard Journal states "It can be used as a desktop computer or a remote computer terminal, yet it maintains the convenience and user interaction of a programmable calculator," directly suggesting its use as a desktop computer. The unit included a one-line alphanumeric LED display, alphanumeric keyboard, up to 8k of RAM, and a built-in cassette drive. Each system also included BASIC resident in ROM, and an optional $25 carrying handle, facilitating portability. The base 4k RAM model cost $5,795 at launch, or about $11,300 in 2026.

=== MCM/70 ===
After about 3 years of development, Micro Computer Machines of Ontario, Canada released the MCM/70 microcomputer in November 1974, just ahead of the Altair 8800. Despite its weight of only 20 pounds and convenient size compared to other machines of the era, there is no indication it was primarily meant as a portable, unlike the HP-9830A and similar systems which were specifically marketed as such (and included carrying handles).

=== SCAMP ===
In 1973, the IBM Los Gatos Scientific Center developed a portable computer prototype called SCAMP (Special Computer APL Machine Portable) based on the IBM PALM processor with a Philips compact cassette drive, small CRT and full-function keyboard. SCAMP emulated an IBM 1130 minicomputer in order to run APL\1130. In 1973, APL was generally available only on mainframe computers, and most desktop-sized microcomputers such as the Wang 2200 or HP 9800 offered only BASIC. Because SCAMP was the first to emulate APL\1130 performance on a portable, single user computer, PC Magazine in 1983 designated SCAMP a "revolutionary concept" and "the world's first personal computer". The engineering prototype is in the Smithsonian Institution.

=== Xerox NoteTaker ===
Xerox NoteTaker, developed in 1976 at Xerox PARC, was a precursor to later portable computers from Osborne Computer Corporation and Compaq, though it remained a prototype and did not enter production.

=== IBM 5100 ===
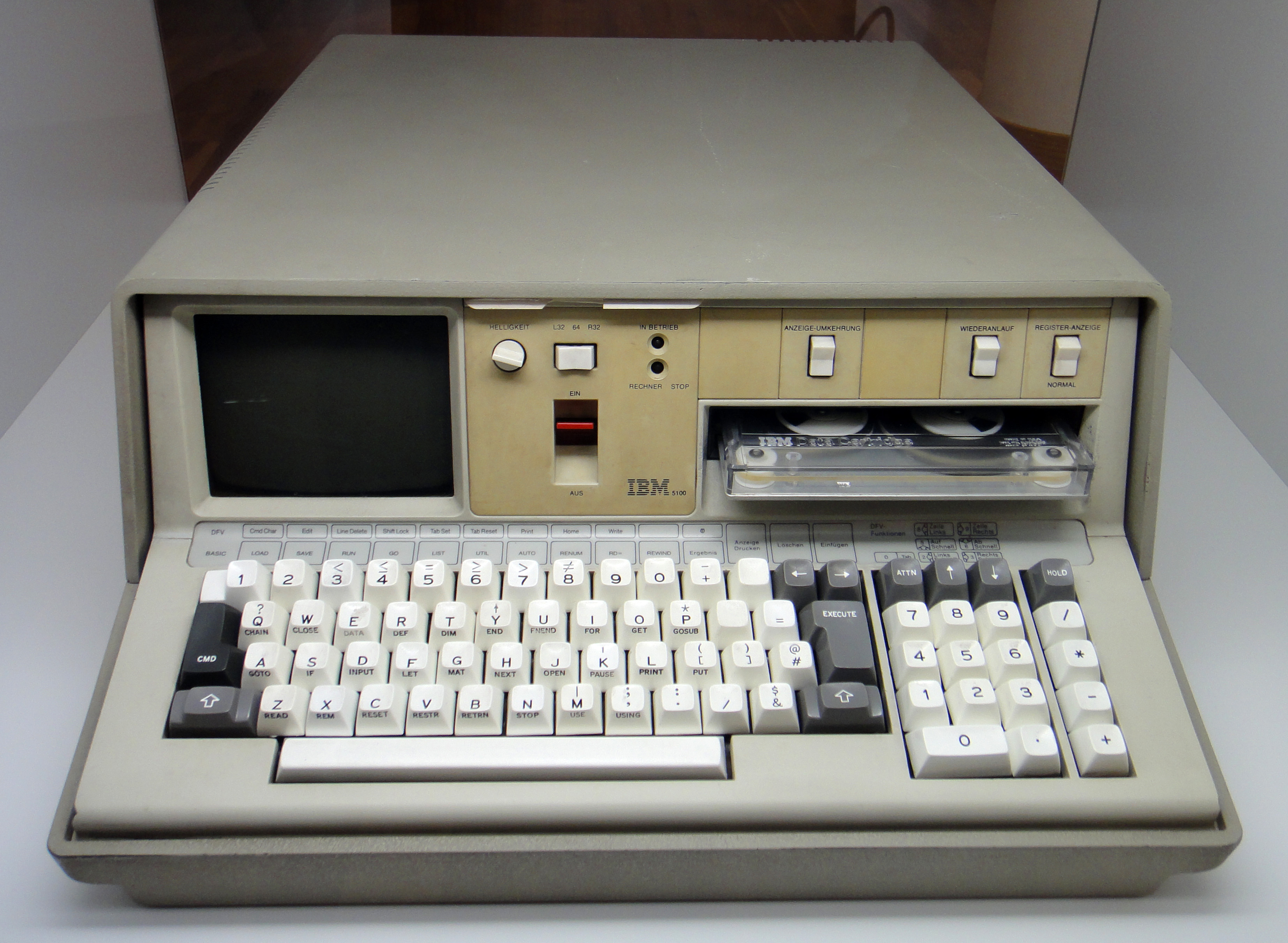
IBM 5100 (1975)

Successful demonstrations of the 1973 SCAMP prototype led to the first commercial IBM 5100 portable microcomputer launched in 1975. The product incorporated an IBM PALM processor, 5-inch (130 mm) CRT, full-function keyboard and the ability to be programmed in both APL and BASIC for engineers, analysts, statisticians and other business problem-solvers. (IBM provided different models of the 5100 supporting only BASIC, only APL, or both selectable by a physical switch on the front panel.) IBM referred to its PALM processor as a microprocessor, though they used that term to mean a processor that executes microcode to implement a higher-level instruction set, rather than its conventional definition of a complete processor on a single silicon integrated circuit; the PALM processor was a large circuit board populated with over a dozen chips. In the late 1960s, such a machine would have been nearly as large as two desks and would have weighed about half a ton (0.45 t). In comparison, the IBM 5100 weighed about 53 lb (24 kg), and was very portable for that time.

=== MIT Suitcase Computer ===
The MIT Suitcase Computer, constructed in 1975, was the first known microprocessor-based portable computer. It was based on the Motorola 6800. Constructed in a Samsonite suitcase approximately 20 by 30 by 8 inches (510 mm × 760 mm × 200 mm) and weighing approximately 20 lb (9.1 kg), it had 4K of SRAM, a serial port to accept downloaded software and connect to a modem, a keyboard and a 40-column thermal printer taken from a cash register. Built by student David Emberson in the MIT Digital Systems Laboratory as a thesis project, it never entered production. It is currently in the collection of Dr. Hoo-Min D. Toong.

=== R2E Micral V ===
The French company R2E, often regarded as one of the first microcomputer manufacturers due to its 1973 i8008-based Micral N system, introduced an early portable computer system long before their 1980 Portal CCMC. The Micral V, introduced in 1978, combined an Intel 8080 CPU, up to 64K of RAM, a small alphanumeric printer, a full keyboard, floppy drive, and 480-character Panaplex plasma display into a single suitcase weighing about 40 pounds. Despite its lukewarm market success, the Micral V served as a blueprint for R2E's much more successful CCMC Portal two years later.

=== Findex ===
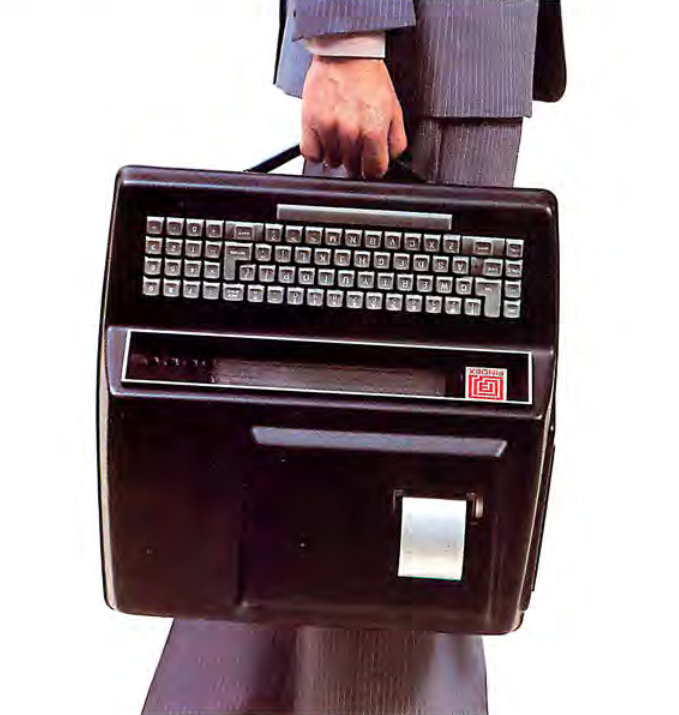
A Findex system being carried by a businessman, circa 1979.

The Findex, produced by Findex, Inc., was a luggable computer system introduced in January 1979. Similar to the Micral V, and unlike many other luggables of the 1980s, the Findex incorporated a multi-line plasma display, as well as a full alphanumeric printer and keyboard, floppy drive, and a rechargeable battery, another unusual feature for portables of the time. This was all packaged in a custom built all-in-one enclosure with a handle, which altogether weighed only 20 pounds, significantly less than later luggables like the Osborne and Compaq. Another unusual capability of the Findex was its support for optional bubble memory, an obsolete form of non-volatile memory storage also used by other early high-end microcomputers such as the 1977 Q1/Lite. Another similarity to the Q1/Lite was a Findex system's capability to network with other units to form a system of terminals. However, a drawback of these advanced features was its high cost, which was $4,980 for the base System 100, and $8,230 for the System 128 with bubble memory.

=== Micro Star or Small One ===
An early portable computer was introduced in July 1979 by GM Research, a small company in Santa Monica, California. The machine was designed and patented by James Murez. It was called the Micro Star and later the name was changed to The Small One. Although Xerox claims to have designed the first such system, the machine by Murez predated anything on the market or that had been documented in any publication at the time – hence the patent was issued. As early as 1979, the U.S. Government was contracting to purchase these machines. Other major customers included Sandia Labs, General Dynamics, BBN (featured on the cover of their annual report in 1980 as the C.A.T. system) and several dozen private individuals and companies around the world. In 1979, Adam Osborne viewed the machine along with several hundred other visitors at the first computer show that was sponsored by the IEEE Westec in Los Angeles. Later that year, the machine was also shown at the first COMDEX show.

=== Portal R2E CCMC ===
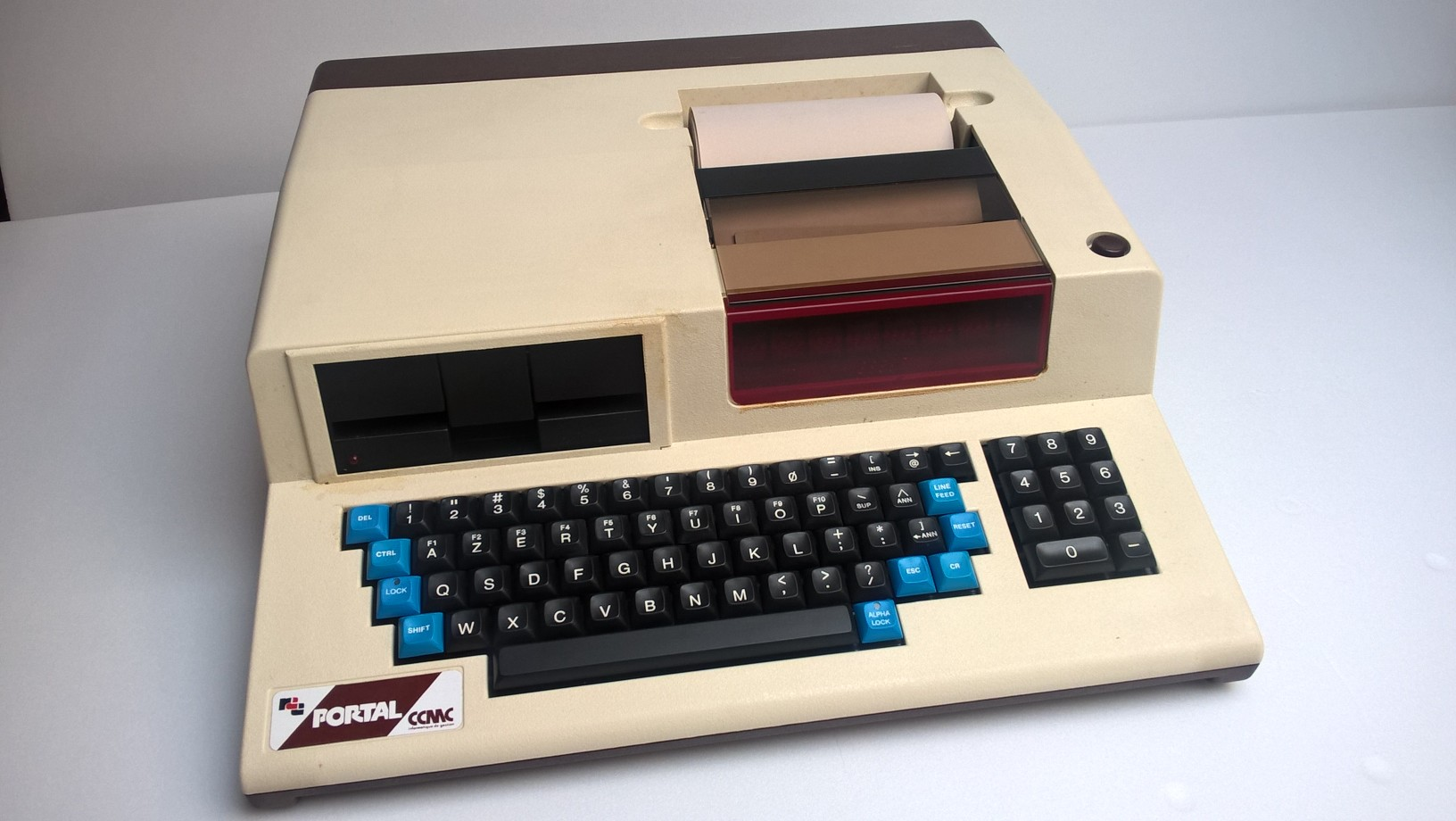
R2E CCMC Portal laptop in September 1980 at the SICOB show in PARIS

The portable micro computer; the "Portal" of the French company R2E Micral CCMC, officially appeared in September 1980 at the Sicob show in Paris. The Portal was a portable microcomputer designed and marketed by the studies and developments department of the French firm R2E Micral in 1980 at the request of the company CCMC, specializing in payroll and accounting. The Portal was based on an Intel 8085 processor, 8-bit, clocked at 2 MHz. It was equipped with a central 64 KB RAM, a keyboard with 58 alpha numeric keys and 11 numeric keys (separate blocks), a 32-character screen, a floppy disk: capacity = 140 000 characters, of a thermal printer: speed = 28 characters/sec, an asynchronous channel, a synchronous channel, a 220 V power supply. Designed for an operating temperature of 15–35 °C (59–95 °F), it weighed 12 kilograms (26 lb) and its dimensions were 45 cm × 45 cm × 15 cm (17.7 in × 17.7 in × 5.9 in). It provided total mobility. Its operating system was Prolog. A few hundred were sold between 1980 and 1983.

=== Osborne 1 ===
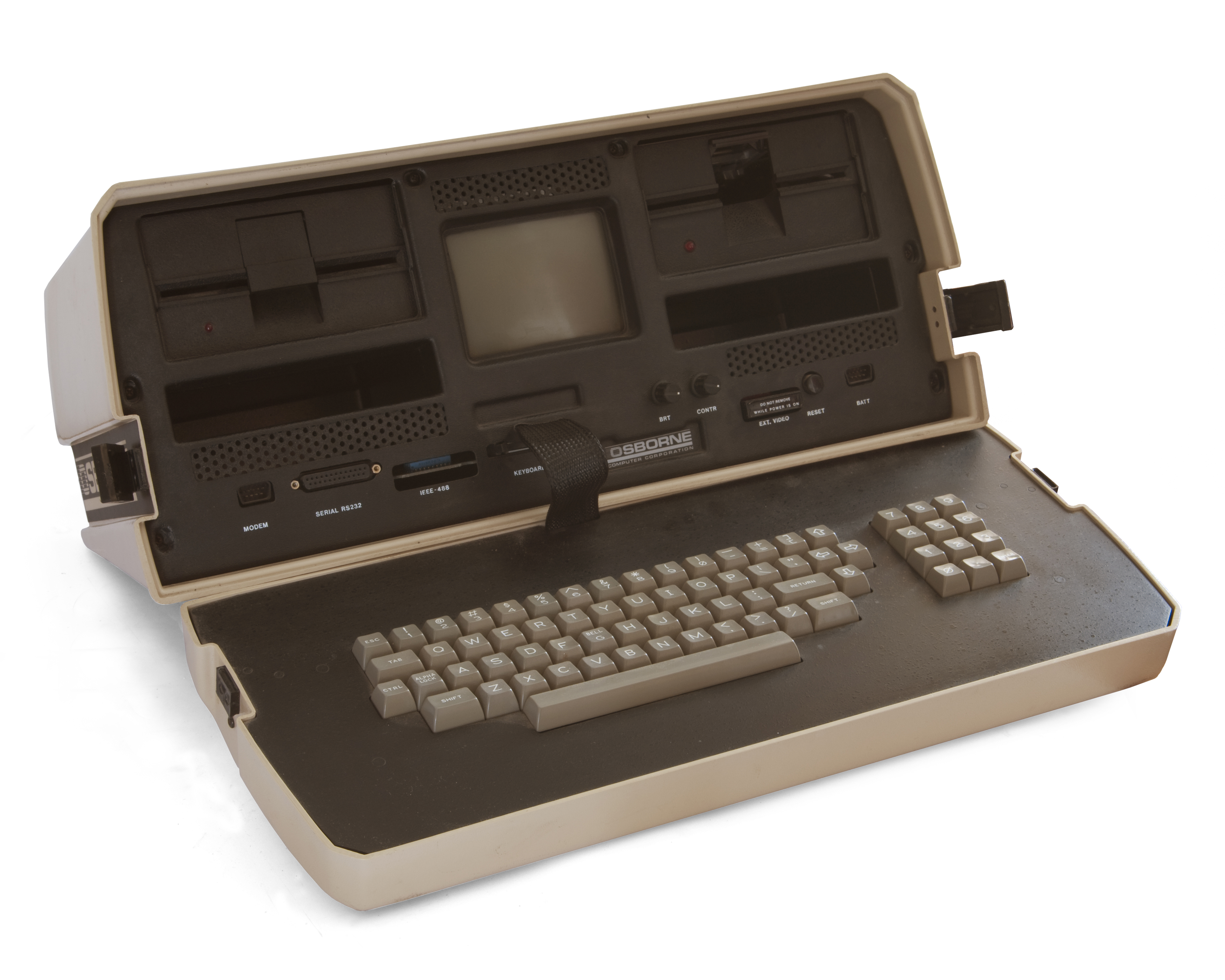
Osborne 1 (1981)

The first mass-produced microprocessor-based portable computer released in 1981 was the Osborne 1, developed by Osborne, which owed much to the NoteTaker's design. The company had early success with the design and went public, but later, due to small screen sizes and other devices being released, it found trouble selling the Osborne. The Osborne 1 is about the size and weight of a sewing machine, and was advertised as the only computer that would fit underneath an airline seat.

=== Kaypro ===
Another early portable computer released in 1982 was named the Kaypro II, although it was the company's first commercially available product. Some of the press mocked its design—one magazine described Kaypro Corporation as "producing computers packaged in tin cans". Others raved about its value, as the company advertised the Kaypro II as "the $1,595 computer that sells for $1,595", some noting that the included software bundle had a retail value over $1,000 by itself, and by mid-1983 the company was selling more than 10,000 units a month, briefly making it the fifth-largest computer maker in the world. It managed to correct most of the Osborne 1's deficiencies: the screen was larger and showed more characters at once, the floppy drives stored over twice as much data, the case was more attractive-looking, and it was also much better-built and more reliable.

=== Grid Compass ===
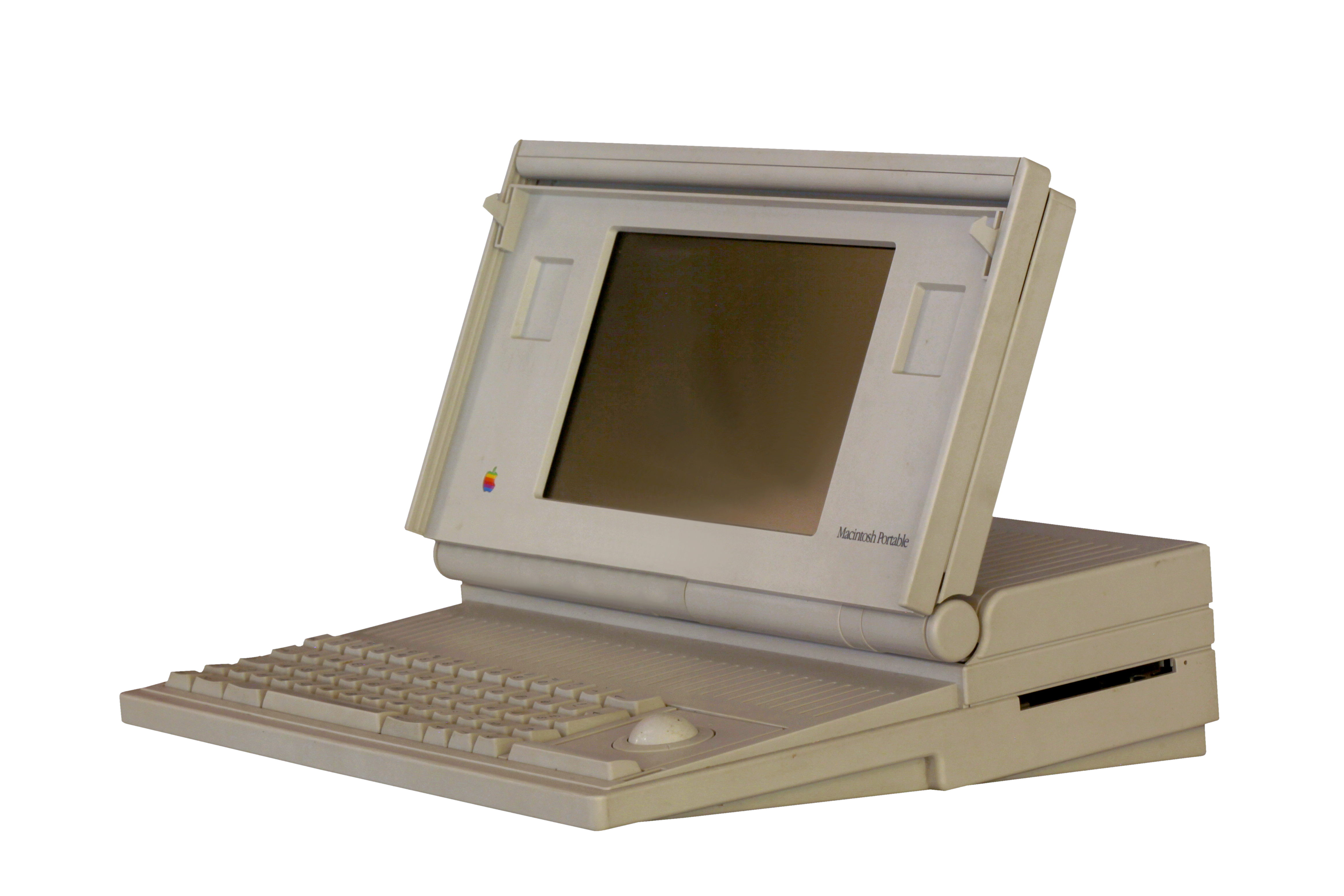
Macintosh Portable (1989)

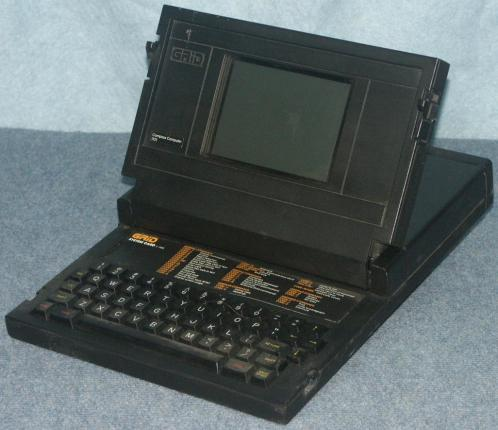
Grid Compass (1982)

The Grid Compass ran its own operating system, GRiD-OS. Its specialized software and high price (US$8,000–10,000) meant that it was limited to specialized applications. The main buyer was the U.S. government. NASA used it on the Space Shuttle during the early 1980s, as it was powerful, lightweight, and compact. The military Special Forces also purchased the machine, as it could be used by paratroopers in combat.

== Post-IBM PC portables ==
=== Compaq Portable and competitors ===
Although Columbia Data Products' MPC 1600, "Multi Personal Computer" came out in the summer of 1982, one of the first extensively IBM PC compatible computers was the Compaq Portable. Eagle Computer then came out with their offering. and Corona Data Systems's PPC-400., the "portable" Hyperion Computer System. Both Eagle Computer and Columbia were sued by IBM for copyright infringement of its BIOS. They settled and were forced to halt production. Neither the Columbia nor the Eagle were nearly as IBM PC DOS compatible as Compaq's offerings.

=== Commodore SX-64 ===
The first full-color portable computer was the Commodore SX-64 in January 1984.

=== Atari STacy ===
Originally announced in 1987, the Atari STacy was released to the public in December 1989 and was one of the first laptop-like portables.

=== Apple Macintosh Portable ===
Apple Inc. introduced and released the Macintosh Portable in 1989, though this device came with a battery, which added to its substantial weight. The Portable has features similar to the Atari STacy, including an integrated trackball and a clamshell case.

=== IBM PS/2 Portable ===
After release of IBM PC Convertible in 1986, IBM still produced classic portable computers, include released in 1989 PS/2 P70 (with upgrade in 1990 to P75), and IBM produce portables for up to release of PS/2 Note and PS/55note notebook lines.

== Modern portables ==
Freelance journalist David Kline wrote in 1983 that portable computers like his Osborne 1 had "radically transformed my work [and] begun to radically reshape the entire field of journalism", but predicted that such luggables ("Like Neanderthal man ... a species without a future") would be replaced by laptops. Corey Sandler of PC agreed, stating in his review of the Compaq Portable "I will reserve awarding a certificate of full mobility to any computer until it fits in my briefcase". In today's world of laptops, smart phones, and tablets, portable computers have evolved and are now mostly used for industrial, commercial or military applications.

== Timeline ==
Year	Price	CPU	CPU clock rate (MHz)	Computer name	Comment
1951	$300 (equivalent to about $3,810 in 2026)	Electromechanical relays	? (2-bit ALU, 2-bit register)	Simon (The Tiny Giant Electric Brain)	First ever computer kit. Sold in the form of schematics which would build a fully working programmable digital computer.
1954		Vacuum tube: Diode gates, tube amplifiers and electrical delay lines	1	DYSEAC	For the military, movable by truck.
1955	~US$86,074 (equivalent to $1,034,492 in 2025)	Custom vacuum tube CPU	0.01	Monrobot V	For the military, movable by truck. Used for surveying and mapmaking.
1957	~US$70,500 (equivalent to $808,161 in 2025) RECOMP II	Transistorized: Printed circuit cards	?	RECOMP I CP-266	For the military, movable by two men.
1959	~US$1,600,000 (equivalent to $17,671,233 in 2025) MOBIDIC A	Custom transistor CPU (inverter logic)	1 MOBIDIC B	MOBIDIC	Truck-based for the military, five were built and deployed. Sylvania later offered a commercial version as the S 9400. Clock speed is unknown but ADD instructions are documented as taking 16μs, i.e., ~62k ADD/s.
1960	~US$6,900,000 (equivalent to $75,092,801 in 2025) (development)	Modular circuit boards	0.448	FADAC	For the military, movable by two men.
1960	~US$125,600 (equivalent to $1,353,207 in 2025)	Standard Modular System with complementary diode–transistor logic	0.087	IBM 1401	Truck-based for military, also touring Datamobile for demos.
1960	~US$40,500 (equivalent to $436,345 in 2025)	Plug-in circuit modules	2	PB 250	Portable as the control computer for commercial mobile (by van) data systems. Can operate entirely from a battery.
1961	~US$500,000 (equivalent to $5,386,971 in 2025)	Custom transistor CPU	1	BASICPAC	For the military, movable by truck.
1962	~US$40,000 (equivalent to $425,743 in 2025)	Circuit modules (micromodular)	?	L-2010	For the military.
1967		Integrated circuit	?	CDC 449	For the military.
1972	$5,975	Custom TTL CPU	8	Hewlett-PackardHP-9830A	Advertised as an advanced "calculator," despite having BASIC resident.
1975	US$8,975	IBM PALM processor	1.9	IBM 5100 Portable Computer	64K = US$17,975.
1975	US$4,000	Motorola 6800	1	MIT Suitcase Computer	4K SRAM, approx. 20 lbs. Built by David Emberson in the MIT Digital Systems Laboratory as a thesis project. Currently in the collection of Dr. Hoo-Min D. Toong.
1976	US$50,000	Intel 8080	1	Xerox NoteTaker	Integrated GUI, mouse, and touchscreen.
1977	US$2,495	Z80	?	Versatile 2	
1978		Intel 8080	2	R2E Micral V	Plasma display and printer.
1978	US$10,225	IBM PALM processor	1.9	IBM 5110	
1979	$4,980	Z80	2.5	Findex	Multi-line plasma display, printer, and optional bubble memory built in.
1979	US$375	6502, 1K	1	Rockwell AIM-65	20-character alphanumeric display.
1979	US$3,250	Custom HP 8-bit	0.613	Hewlett-Packard Model 85	
1980		?	?	PA512	Made in Serbia.
1980	US$230	SC43177, SC43178	TRS-80 Pocket Computer		
1980		Intel 8085	2.0	Portal R2E CCMC	
1981	US$1,795	Z80	4.0	Osborne 1	
1981	US$795	2× Hitachi 6301	0.614	Epson HX-20	
1981		Z80 compatible	?	Husky (computer)	
1982		8088	4.77	Columbia Data Products	
1982		Z80A	4	Grundy NewBrain	
1982		Z80	2.5	Kaypro	
1982	US$8,000	8086	?	Grid Compass 1100	NASA laptop
1982		Z80	4.0	Osborne Executive	
1983		x86	?	Hyperion (computer)	
1983		x86	?	Compaq Portable	
1983	US$1,099	80C85	2.4	TRS-80 Model 100	40 × 8 LCD
1983		Z80A, 8086, 128K	?	Seequa Chameleon	
1983		Z80A	3.4	Sord IS-11	
1983	US$1,595	Z80A	4	Zorba	
1984	US$4,225	8088	4.77	IBM 5155	
1984		Z80	?	Actrix (computer)	
~1984		8088	4.77	Bondwell-8	
1984	US$995	Z80	2.45	Epson PX-8 Geneva	
1984		6502	1.02	Commodore SX-64	First portable with color display
1984	US$2,895	Harris 80C86	4	Data General-One	First true IBM PC-compatible (mostly) laptop; CGA (640x200) monochrome LCD
1984		Z80	4.0	Osborne Vixen	
1984		80C88	?	ZP-150	
1984	US$595	?	?	HP-71B	Calculator programmable in BASIC
1984	US$2,995	Harris 80C86	5.33	HP 110	80 × 16 LCD, 300-baud modem
1984	£1,965	8086	4.77	Apricot Portable	First portable computer with 25-line LCD. Included speech recognition, wireless keyboard, and optional wireless mouse
1985	US$995	Z80	4	Bondwell-2	
1985		Harris 80C86	5.33	HP 110 Plus	80 × 25 LCD, 1200-baud modem
1985	US$1,899	Toshiba T1100 80C88	4.77	Toshiba T1100	80 × 25 LCD
1986		8088	4.77	IBM 5140	
1986		Intel 80286	8	Compaq Portable II	
1986		?	?	LPA512	
1987		Z80	?	Cambridge Z88	
1988		Intel 8088	?	NEC UltraLite	
1988	US$2,299	68HC000	8	Atari STacy	
1989		Intel 8088	4.9152	Atari Portfolio	
1989	US$2,000	Intel 80C88	7	Poqet PC (Classic)	
1989		8086	9.55	Compaq LTE	
1989		Motorola 68000	16	Macintosh Portable	
1989		Motorola 68000	15	Outbound Laptop	
1991		Motorola 68000	8	ST BOOK	
1991		NEC V20	5.37	HP 95LX	
1991	US$2,300	Motorola 68000	16	Apple PowerBook 100	
1992		IBM 486SLC	25	IBM ThinkPad 700	The first ThinkPad
1992		Z80, 64K	?	Amstrad NC100	
1992	US$4,950	CY601 + CY604	25	SPARCbook1	Unix with SunOS
1993		Intel "Hornet" 80186	7.91	HP 100LX	
1993		?	?	AlphaSmart	
1994		Intel "Hornet" 80186	7.91	HP 200LX	
1995		Intel 80486DX4	75	IBM ThinkPad Butterfly keyboard	IBM ThinkPad 701c and 701Cs, famous for their "Butterfly Keyboard" which slides into place when opening the lid
1996		Intel Pentium	133	Panasonic Toughbook CF-25	The first Toughbook, an example of a ruggedized laptop
1997		Intel Pentium	150	IBM ThinkPad 380	An average late-1990s notebook
2001		SA-1110	206	SIMpad	
2001		Intel Mobile Pentium III-M	1200	Dell Precision M40	One of the world's first mobile workstation notebooks
2002		Intel Pentium 4	2400	Alienware Area 51-M	An early example of a gaming laptop: high performance desktop components in a notebook
2003		Intel Pentium M	1700	IBM ThinkPad R50p	Notable for its ultra high resolution 2048x1536 (QXGA) display option

== See also ==
- Bobst Graphic Scrib Portable
- DYSEAC, 1954, housed in a truck
- Handheld PC (palmtop)
- Laptop
- Mobile computing
- Mobile device
- Netbook
- Personal computer
- Personal digital assistant (PDA)
- Portal laptop computer
