= Zorba (computer) =

1980s portable computer

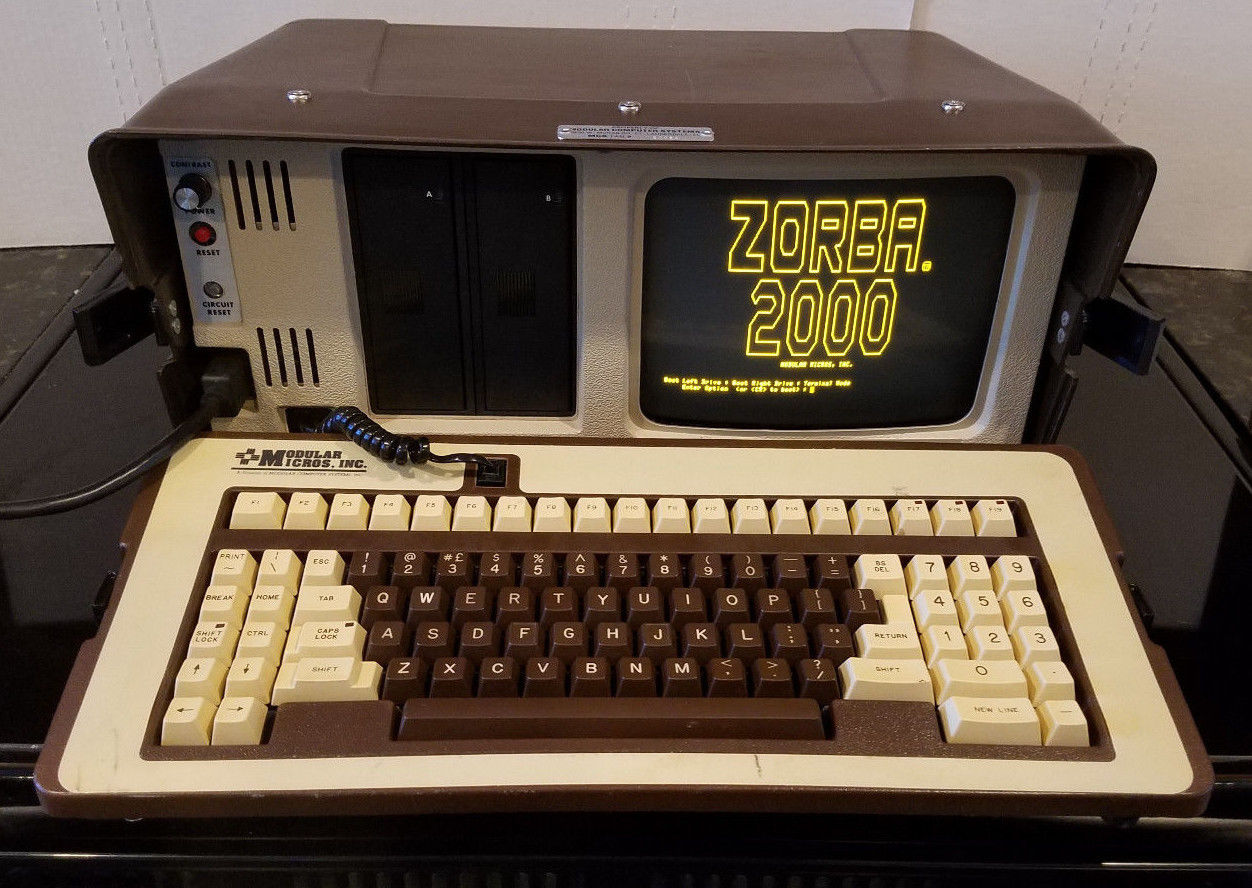
- Modular Micros Zorba 2000 Computer
- Manufacturer: Telcon Industries
- Type: Portable computer
- Released: 1983
- Introductory price: US$1,595 (equivalent to $5,160 in 2025)
- Operating system: CP/M
- CPU: Zilog Z80
- Memory: 64 KB

The Zorba was a portable computer running the CP/M operating system manufactured in 1983 and 1984. It was originally manufactured by Telcon Industries, Inc., of Fort Lauderdale, Florida (USA), a company specialized in telecommunication equipment manufacturing.

The Zorba was one of the last CP/M computers on the market. By the time it was introduced, the Kaypro and Osborne machines already dominated that market. The introduction of the Compaq Portable, compatible with the IBM PC and running MS-DOS, sealed the fate of the CP/M machines.

== History ==
The Zorba was one of the last 8-bit portable computers running the CP/M operating system. It had features very similar to the Kaypro II. The original sale price was $1,595.

The rights for the Zorba were sold by Telcon for $5 million to MODCOMP (Modular Computer Systems, Inc), a company which specialized in mini-computer manufacturing. Modular Micro Group was created specifically to market the Zorba. The Zorba 7 was sold as the Modular Micros GC-200.

Modular Micro Group sold two different models. The Zorba 7 sold for $1,595. It had a 7" green CRT screen and two 410K floppies. The Zorba 2000 sold for $2,000. It had a 9" green or yellow screen, two 820K floppies, and an available 10 MB hard drive.

Sales were very poor. Within a year, the Zorba computer stock was sold to Gemini Electronics, a company which specialized in selling surplus stocks. The remaining inventory was sold at a price of about $799 per unit.

In all, only about 6,000 Zorba computers were manufactured and sold.

== Available software ==
The Zorba computer came with several video emulations, including Heathkit 19/89, Zenith 19/89, and DEC VT52. This allowed them to run virtually any existing CP/M software.

A "Perfect Software Package" was available for $190. This included the Perfect Writer word processor, the "Perfect Speller" spell checker, the "Perfect Filer" database manager, and the "Perfect Calc" program for spreadsheets.

It could also run the MicroPro Software Package (WordStar, Mailmerge, SpellStar, CalcStar, and DataStar).

== Features ==
The Zorba had a detachable 95-key keyboard with 19 function keys and numeric keypad. It had a Z80A CPU, running at 4Mhz. It came with 64 KB of RAM and 4 KB of ROM (expandable to 16 KB).

The text-only screen had 80 characters × 25 lines.

It came with two serial ports, a parallel port, and an IEEE-488 port.

== See also ==
- Personal computer
- Timeline of portable computers
