= Xerox NoteTaker =

Portable computer by Xerox

- Developer: Xerox PARC
- Type: Portable computer
- Released: 1978
- Introductory price: US$ 50,000 (today $241000)
- Units shipped: 10 prototypes only
- Operating system: Smalltalk
- CPU: Intel 8086 @ 5 MHz
- Memory: 256 KB RAM
- Storage: Floppy disk drive
- Display: 7 inch (18 cm) built-in touch-sensitive monochrome display monitor
- Sound: Stereo speakers
- Input: Folded out keyboard, Microphone
- Controller input: Mouse
- Connectivity: Ethernet board
- Power: Rechargeable battery
- Dimensions: 2 1/2 x 21 1/2 x 7 1/2 in
- Weight: 22 kg (49 lb)
- Predecessor: Dynabook

The Xerox NoteTaker is a portable computer developed at Xerox PARC in Palo Alto, California, in 1978. Although it did not enter production, and only around ten prototypes were built, it strongly influenced the design of the later Osborne 1 and Compaq Portable computers.

== Development ==
The NoteTaker was developed by a team that included Adele Goldberg, Douglas Fairbairn, and Larry Tesler. It drew heavily on earlier research by Alan Kay, who had previously developed the Dynabook project. While the Dynabook was a concept for a transportable computer that was impossible to implement with available technology, the NoteTaker was intended to show what could be done.

== Description ==
The computer employed what was then highly advanced technology, including a built-in monochrome display monitor, a floppy disk drive and a mouse. It had 256 KB of RAM, then a very large amount, and used a 5 MHz Intel 8086 CPU. It used a version of the Smalltalk operating system that was originally written for the Xerox Alto computer, which pioneered the graphical user interface.

The NoteTaker fitted into a case similar in form to that of a portable sewing machine; the keyboard folded out from the bottom to reveal the monitor and floppy drive. The form factor was later used on the highly successful "luggable" computers, including the Osborne 1 and Compaq Portable. However, these later models were about half as heavy as the NoteTaker, which weighed 22 kg (49 lb).

== See also ==
- IBM 5100
- Osborne 1
- Kaypro
- Compaq Portable
- Portable computer
