= Personal computer =

Computer intended for use by an individual person

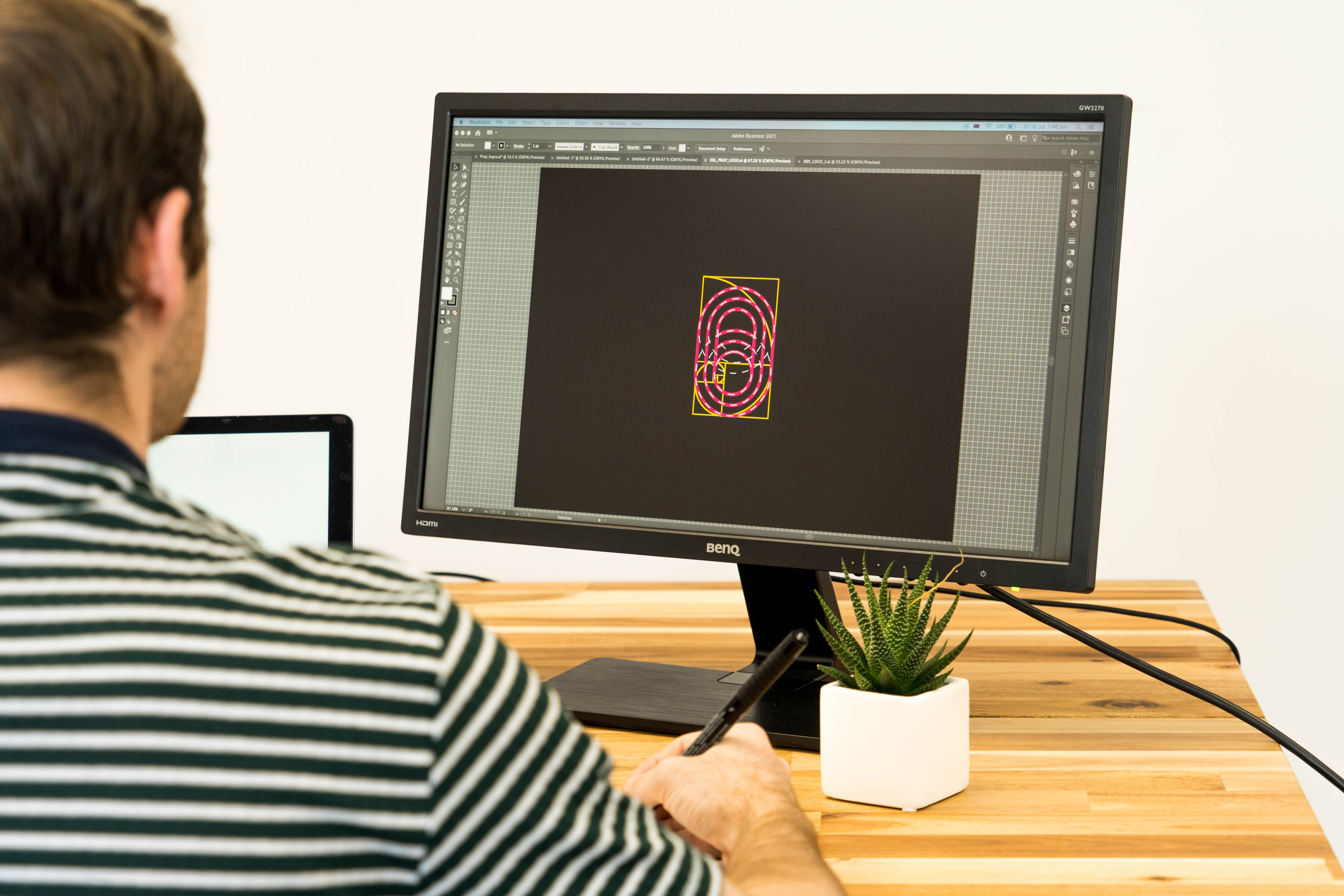
A man using a desktop computer, a type of personal computer.

A person using a laptop computer.

A personal computer (PC) is a computer designed for personal use. It is typically used for tasks such as word processing, web browsing, email, file management, spreadsheets, gaming, and video calling. Unlike large, costly minicomputers and mainframes, time-sharing by many people at the same time is not used with personal computers. Personal computers are designed to be operated directly by an end user, instead of a computer expert, administrator, company or technician.

The term "home computer" was used in the late 1970s and 1980s for a class of microcomputers that were intended for the use of a single, non-technical user as opposed to the business, scientific, or engineering-oriented computers at the time. Examples include the Apple II, TRS-80, and Commodore 64. In 1981, the IBM Personal Computer was released, and IBM PC compatibles soon followed. The advent of personal computers and the concurrent Digital Revolution have significantly affected the lives of people.

Since the early 1990s, IBM PC compatibles running the "Wintel" software–hardware platform stack (a Microsoft operating system, initially MS-DOS and later Windows, on a CPU based on Intel's x86 architecture) came to dominate the personal computer market. Alternatives to Wintel occupy a minority share of the market; they are predominantly Unix-based or Unix-like operating systems, such as macOS on Apple's Mac platform, and Linux, including the Linux-derived ChromeOS and Googlebook OS, though most distributions are free and open-source. Other notable platforms until the 1990s were the Amiga, Atari ST, and the PC-98 line.

== Terminology ==
The term 'PC' is an initialism for 'personal computer'. While the IBM Personal Computer incorporated the designation into its model name, the term originally described personal computers of any brand. The term is often used specifically for computers running Windows in contrast to Apple's Mac computers or Chromebooks by media and industry.

In 1995, a CBS segment on the growing popularity of personal computing reported: "For many newcomers PC stands for Pain and Confusion."

== History ==
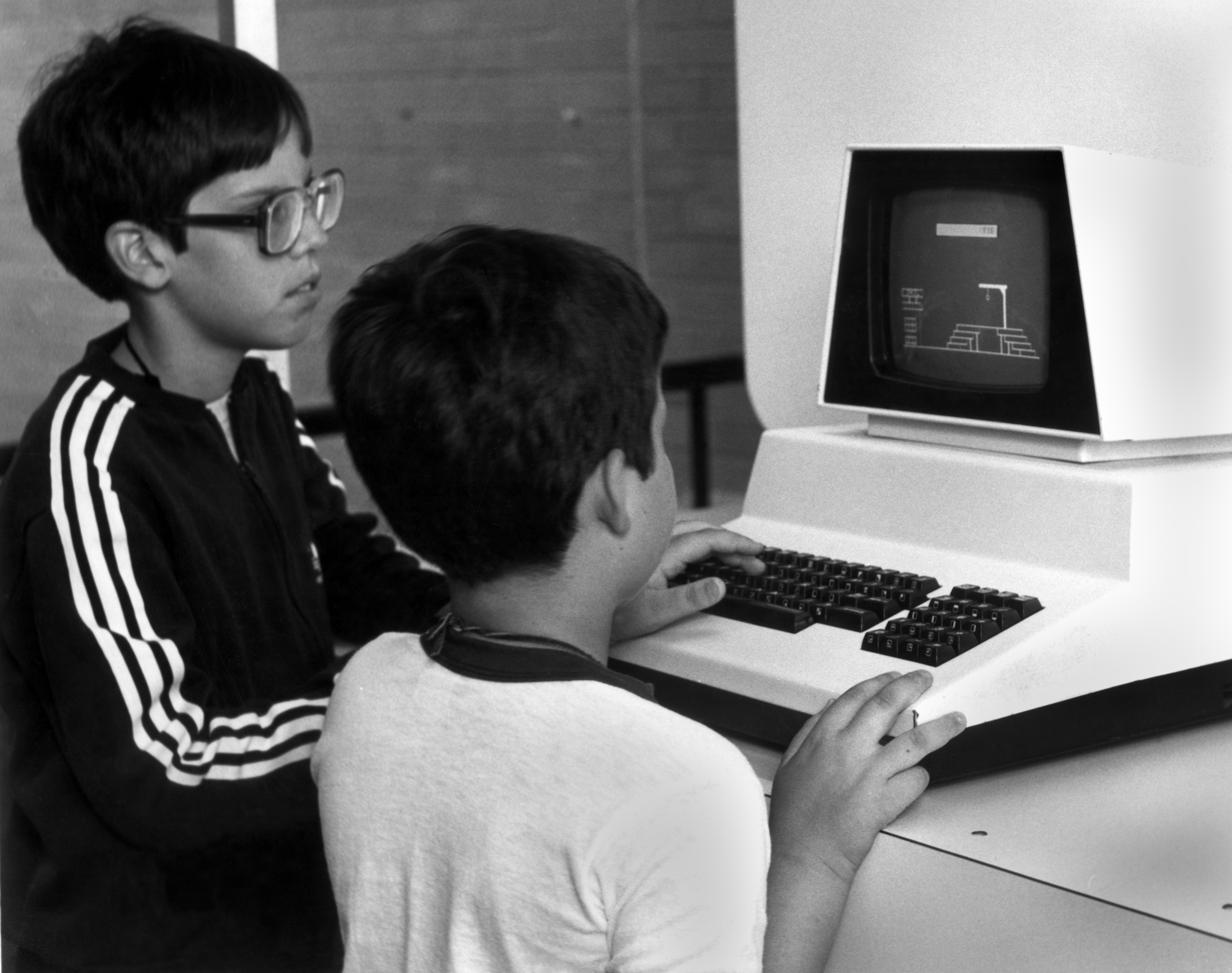
Commodore PET in 1983 (at the American Museum of Science and Energy), an early example of a personal computer

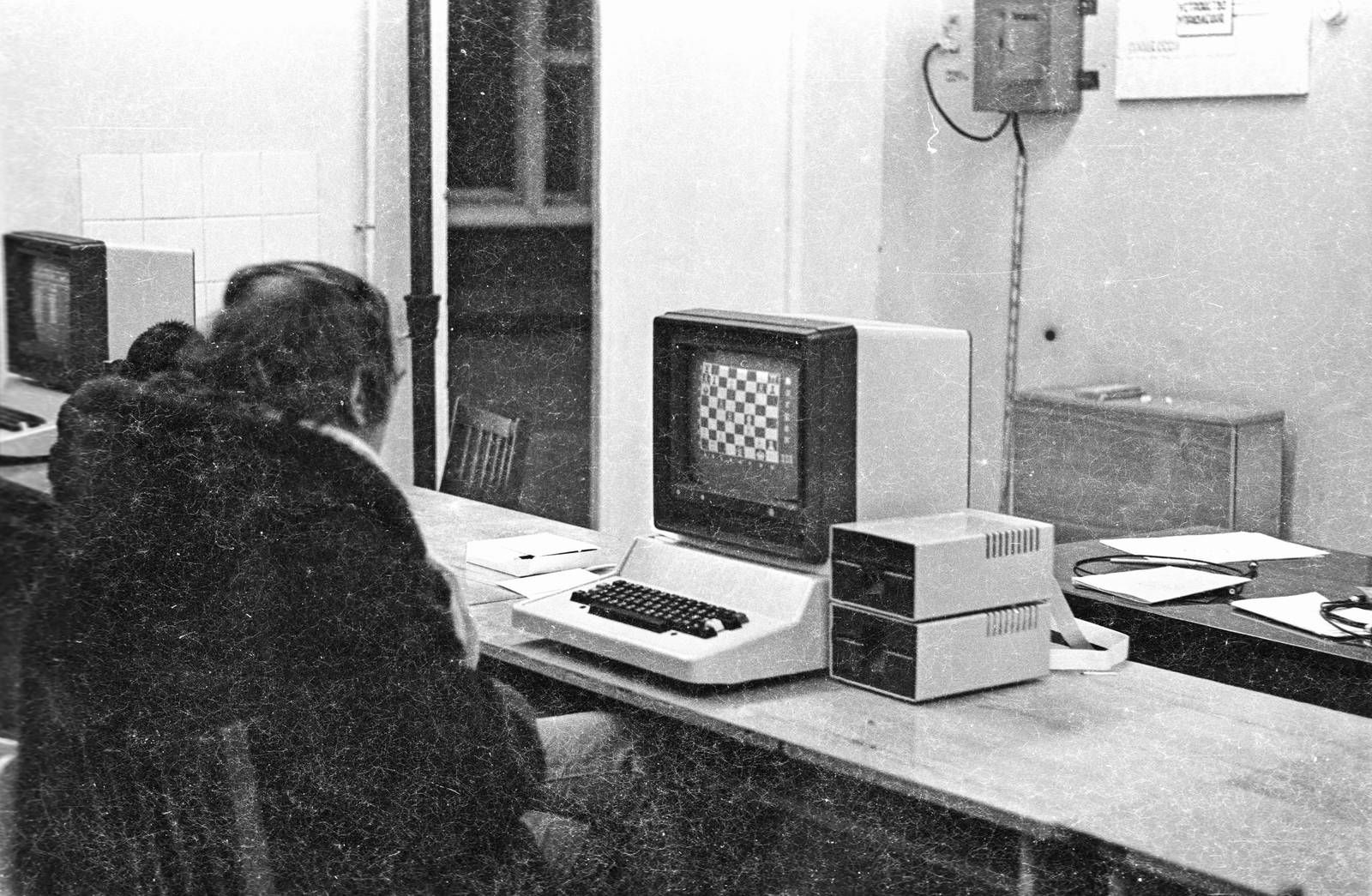
The 8-bit architecture Pravetz 82 computer produced in Bulgaria from 1982, in a classroom in the Soviet Union

The "brain" [computer] may one day come down to our level [of the common people] and help with our income-tax and book-keeping calculations. But this is speculation and there is no sign of it so far.

— British newspaper The Star in a June 1949 news article about the EDSAC computer, long before the era of the personal computers.

=== Origins ===
In the history of computing, early experimental machines could be operated by a single attendant. For example, ENIAC which became operational in 1946 could be run by a single, albeit highly trained, person. This mode pre-dated the batch programming, or time-sharing modes with multiple users connected through terminals to mainframe computers. Computers intended for laboratory, instrumentation, or engineering purposes were built, and could be operated by one person in an interactive fashion. Examples include such systems as the Bendix G15 and LGP-30 of 1956, and the Soviet MIR series of computers developed from 1965 to 1969. By the early 1970s, people in academic or research institutions had the opportunity for single-person use of a computer system in interactive mode for extended durations, although these systems would still have been too expensive to be owned by a single person.

=== 1960s ===
The personal computer was made possible by major advances in semiconductor technology. In 1959, the silicon integrated circuit (IC) chip was developed by Robert Noyce at Fairchild Semiconductor, and the metal–oxide–semiconductor (MOS) transistor was developed by Mohamed Atalla and Dawon Kahng at Bell Labs. The MOS integrated circuit was commercialized by RCA in 1964, and then the silicon-gate MOS integrated circuit was developed by Federico Faggin at Fairchild in 1968. Faggin later used silicon-gate MOS technology to develop the first single-chip microprocessor, the Intel 4004, in 1971. The first microcomputers, based on microprocessors, were developed during the early 1970s. Widespread commercial availability of microprocessors, from the mid-1970s onwards, made computers cheap enough for small businesses and individuals to own.

In what was later to be called the Mother of All Demos, SRI researcher Douglas Engelbart in 1968 gave a preview of features that would later become staples of personal computers: e-mail, hypertext, word processing, video conferencing, and the mouse. The demonstration required technical support staff and a mainframe time-sharing computer that were far too costly for individual business use at the time.

=== 1970s ===
Early personal computers were very expensive. Many of these were built in TTL logic, so technically not microcomputers in many cases. However, by the mid-1970s, some microprocessor-based personal computers started to be sold in kit form, albeit in limited volumes, and of interest mostly to hobbyists and technicians. Programming could be done via toggle switches to enter instructions, and output was provided by front panel lamps. More practical use required adding a serial computer terminal or internal expansion cards for a keyboard and a computer display, as well as for peripherals such as disk drives and printers.

Micral N was the earliest commercial, non-kit microcomputer based on a microprocessor, the Intel 8008. It was built starting in 1972, and a few hundred units were sold. This had been preceded by the Datapoint 2200 in 1970, for which the Intel 8008 had been commissioned, though not accepted for use. The CPU design implemented in the Datapoint 2200 became the basis for x86 architecture used in the original IBM PC and its descendants.

In 1973, the IBM Los Gatos Scientific Center developed a portable computer prototype called SCAMP (Special Computer APL Machine Portable) based on the IBM PALM processor with a Philips compact cassette drive, small CRT, and full function keyboard. SCAMP emulated an IBM 1130 minicomputer in order to run APL/1130. In 1973, APL was generally available only on mainframe computers, and most desktop sized microcomputers such as the Wang 2200 or HP 9800 offered only BASIC. Because SCAMP was the first to emulate APL/1130 performance on a portable, single user computer, PC Magazine in 1983 designated SCAMP a "revolutionary concept" and "the world's first personal computer". This seminal, single user portable computer now resides in the Smithsonian Institution, Washington, D.C.. Successful demonstrations of the 1973 SCAMP prototype led to the IBM 5100 portable microcomputer launched in 1975 with the ability to be programmed in both APL and BASIC for engineers, analysts, statisticians, and other business problem-solvers. In the late 1960s such a machine would have been nearly as large as two desks and would have weighed about half a ton.

Another desktop portable APL machine, the MCM/70, created by Mers Kutt's company Micro Computer Machines Inc., was demonstrated in 1973 and shipped in 1974. Priced between $3,500 and $9,800 depending on the configuration, the MCM/70 was the first personal desktop microcomputer. It used the Intel 8008 processor, and featured a 51-key keyboard and a Burroughs Self-Scan plasma display panel that could display 32 characters per line. It ran the AVS/EASY operating system, and had the capacity for 8 kilobytes of RAM and 14 kilobytes of ROM. Users could optionally add cassette drives that provided more than 100 kilobytes of external storage.

A seminal step in personal computing was the 1973 Xerox Alto, developed at Xerox's Palo Alto Research Center (PARC). It had a graphical user interface (GUI) which later served as inspiration for Apple's Macintosh, and Microsoft's Windows operating system. The Alto was a demonstration project, not commercialized, as the parts were too expensive to be affordable.

Also in 1973 Hewlett Packard 9100A introduced fully BASIC programmable microcomputers that fit entirely on top of a desk, including a keyboard, a small one-line display, and printer. The Wang 2200 microcomputer of 1973 had a full-size cathode ray tube (CRT) and cassette tape storage. These were generally expensive specialized computers sold for business or scientific uses.

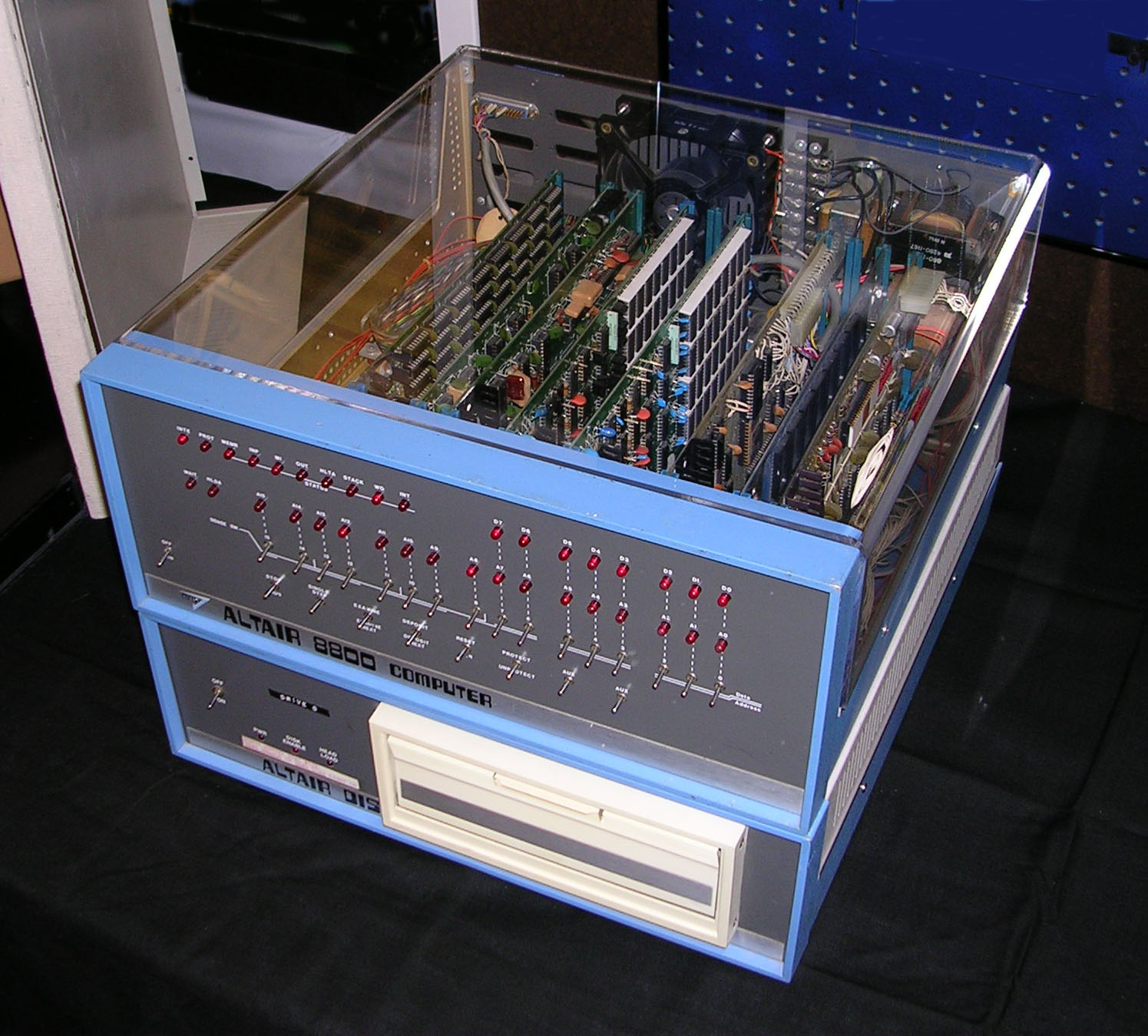
Altair 8800, one of the first personal computers

1974 saw the introduction of what is considered by many to be the first true personal computer, the Altair 8800 created by Micro Instrumentation and Telemetry Systems (MITS). Based on the 8-bit Intel 8080 Microprocessor, the Altair is widely recognized as the spark that ignited the microcomputer revolution as the first commercially successful personal computer. The computer bus designed for the Altair was to become a de facto standard in the form of the S-100 bus, and the first programming language for the machine was Microsoft's founding product, Altair BASIC.

In 1976, Steve Jobs and Steve Wozniak sold the Apple I computer circuit board, which was fully prepared and contained about 30 chips. The Apple I computer differed from the other kit-style hobby computers of the era. At the request of Paul Terrell, owner of the Byte Shop, Jobs and Wozniak were given their first purchase order, for 50 Apple I computers, only if the computers were assembled and tested and not a kit computer. Terrell wanted to have computers to sell to a wide range of users, not just experienced electronics hobbyists who had the soldering skills to assemble a computer kit. The Apple I as delivered was still technically a kit computer, as it did not have a power supply, case, or keyboard when it was delivered to the Byte Shop.

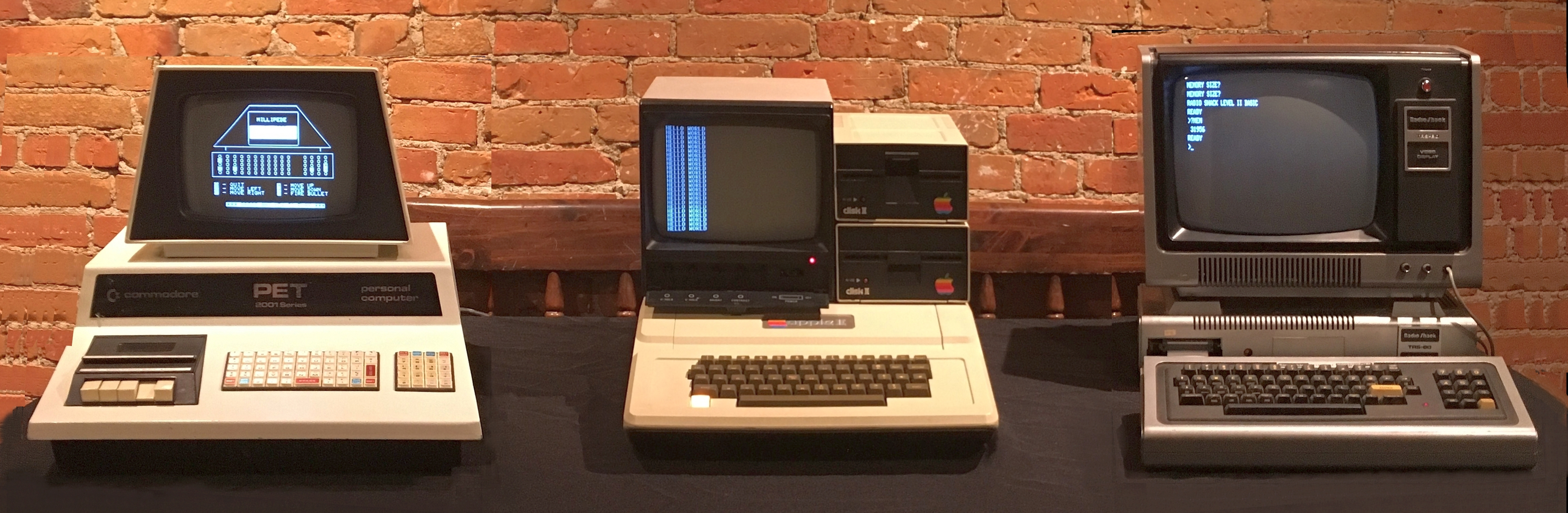
The three personal computers referred to by Byte Magazine as the "1977 Trinity" of home computing: The Commodore PET, the Apple II, and the TRS-80 Model I.

The first successfully mass-marketed personal computer to be announced was the Commodore PET after being revealed in January 1977. However, it was back-ordered and not available until later that year. Three months later (April), the Apple II (usually referred to as the Apple) was announced with the first units being shipped 10 June 1977, and the TRS-80 from Tandy Corporation / Tandy Radio Shack following in August 1977, which sold over 100,000 units during its lifetime. Together, especially in the North American market, these 3 machines were referred to as the "1977 trinity". Mass-market, ready-assembled computers had arrived, and allowed a wider range of people to use computers, focusing more on software applications and less on development of the processor hardware.

In 1977 the Heath company introduced personal computer kits known as Heathkits, starting with the Heathkit H8, followed by the Heathkit H89 in late 1979. With the purchase of the Heathkit H8 you would obtain the chassis and CPU card to assemble yourself, additional hardware such as the H8-1 memory board that contained 4k of RAM could also be purchased in order to run software. The Heathkit H11 model was released in 1978 and was one of the first 16-bit personal computers; however, due to its high retail cost of $1,295 was discontinued in 1982.

=== 1980s ===
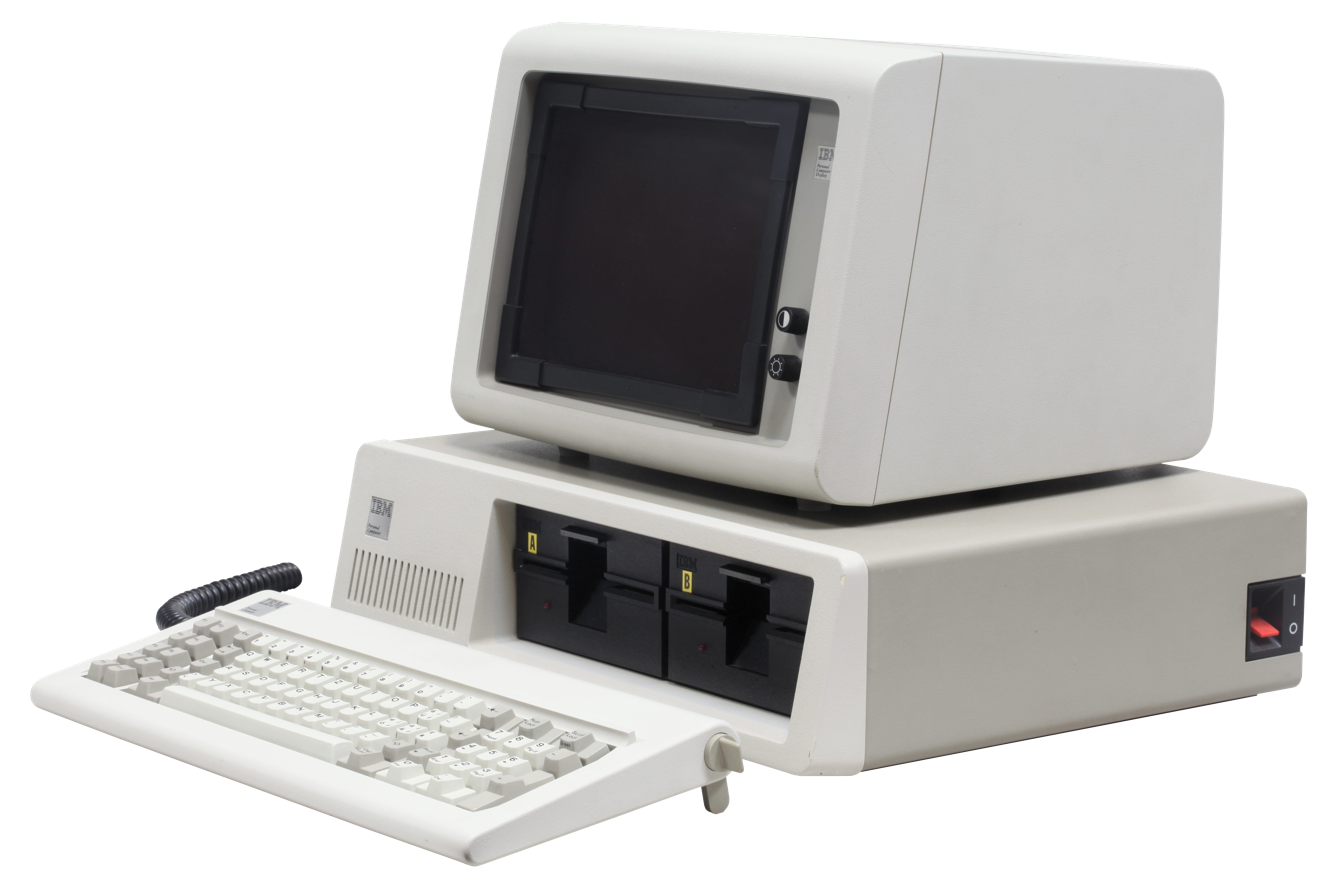
IBM 5150, released in 1981

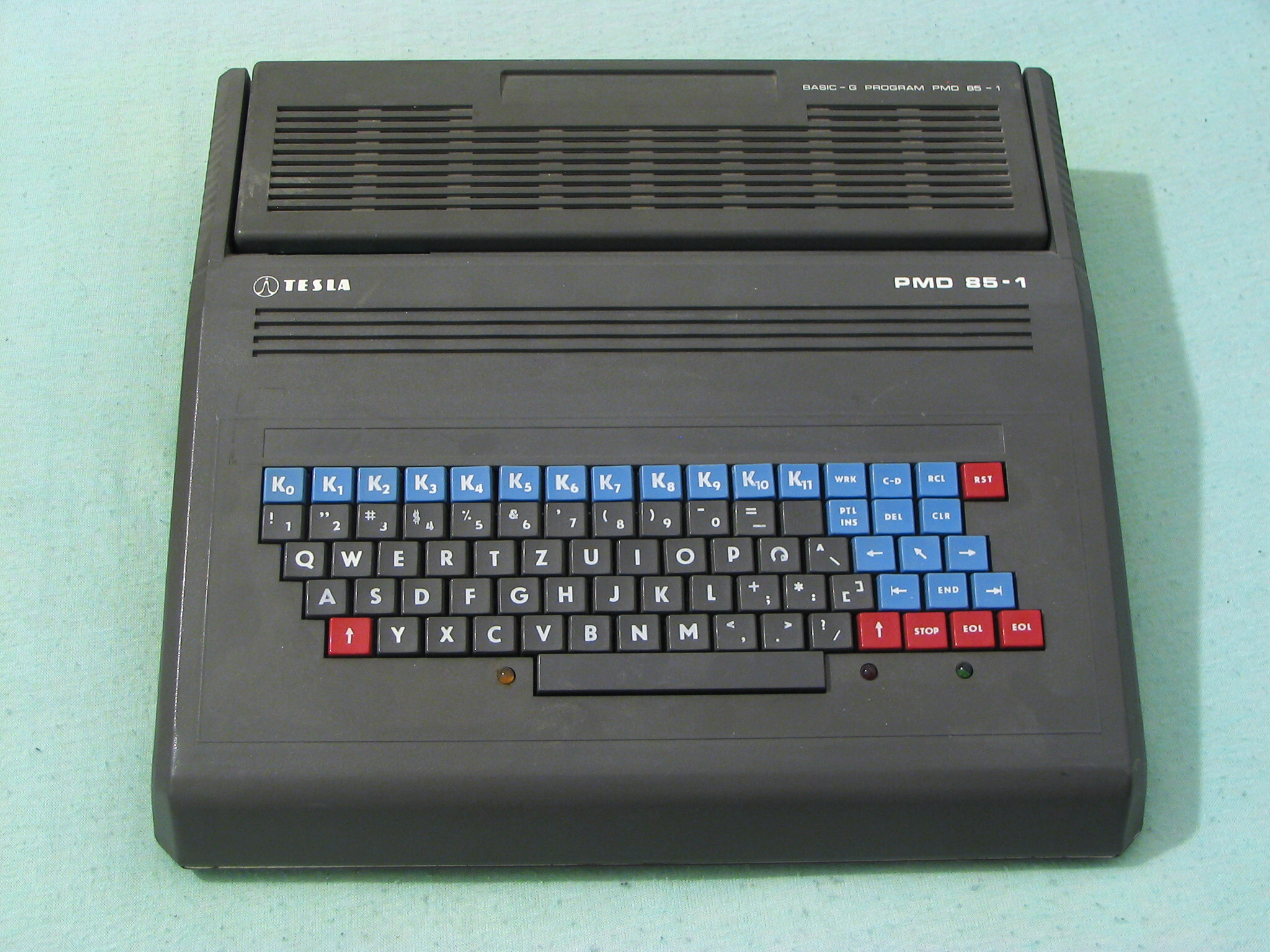
The 8-bit PMD 85 personal computer produced in 1985–1990 by the Tesla company in the former Socialist Czechoslovakia

During the early 1980s, home computers were further developed for household use, with software for personal productivity, programming and games. They typically could be used with a television already in the home as the computer display, with low-detail blocky graphics and a limited color range, and text about 40 characters wide by 25 characters tall. Sinclair Research, a UK company, produced the ZX Series‍—‌the ZX80 (1980), ZX81 (1981), and the ZX Spectrum; the latter was introduced in 1982, and totaled 8 million unit sold. Following came the Commodore 64, totaled 17 million units sold, the Galaksija (1983) introduced in Yugoslavia and the Amstrad CPC series (464–6128).

In the same year, the NEC PC-98 was introduced, which was a very popular personal computer that sold more than 18 million units. Another famous personal computer, the revolutionary Amiga 1000, was unveiled by Commodore on 23 July 1985. The Amiga 1000 featured a multitasking, windowing operating system, color graphics with a 4096-color palette, stereo sound, Motorola 68000 CPU, 256 KB RAM, and 880 KB 3.5-inch disk drive, for US$1,295.

IBM's first PC, the IBM 5150, was introduced on 12 August 1981 at a price of US$1,565. It operated with the 5 megahertz (later 16 megahertz) Intel 8088 chip. What was later dubbed MS-DOS was the computer's Microsoft-produced operating system. A word processor EasyWriter and a spreadsheet client VisiCalc were preinstalled. Customers could pay an additional $3,000 to add a printer, a display and two diskette drives. The 5150's open architecture (IBM encouraged the development of third-party software and peripherals for the computer) set a mass market standard for PC design.

In 1982 the personal computer, dubbed The Computer, was named Machine of the Year by Time magazine.

Somewhat larger and more expensive systems were aimed at office and small business use. These often featured 80-column text displays but might not have had graphics or sound capabilities. These microprocessor-based systems were still less costly than time-shared mainframes or minicomputers.

Workstations were characterized by high-performance processors and graphics displays, with large-capacity local disk storage, networking capability, and running under a multitasking operating system. Eventually, due to the influence of the IBM PC on the personal computer market, personal computers and home computers lost any technical distinction. Business computers acquired color graphics capability and sound, and home computers and game systems users used the same processors and operating systems as office workers. Mass-market computers had graphics capabilities and memory comparable to dedicated workstations of a few years before. Even local area networking, originally a way to allow business computers to share expensive mass storage and peripherals, became a standard feature of personal computers used at home.

An increasingly important set of uses for personal computers relied on the ability of the computer to communicate with other computer systems, allowing interchange of information. Experimental public access to a shared mainframe computer system was demonstrated as early as 1973 in the Community Memory project, but bulletin board systems and online service providers became more commonly available after 1978. Commercial Internet service providers emerged in the late 1980s, giving public access to the rapidly growing network.

In 1984, Apple Computer launched the Macintosh, with an advertisement during the Super Bowl. The Macintosh was the first successful mass-market mouse-driven computer with a graphical user interface or 'WIMP' (Windows, Icons, Menus, and Pointers). Based on the Motorola 68000 microprocessor, the Macintosh included many of the Lisa's features at a price of US$2,495. The Macintosh was introduced with 128 KB of RAM and later that year a 512 KB RAM model became available. To reduce costs compared to the Lisa, the year-younger Macintosh had a simplified motherboard design, no internal hard drive, and a single 3.5-inch floppy drive. Applications that came with the Macintosh included MacPaint, a bit-mapped graphics program, and MacWrite, which demonstrated WYSIWYG word processing.

The Macintosh was a successful personal computer for years to come. This is particularly due to the introduction of desktop publishing in 1985 through Apple's partnership with Adobe. This partnership introduced the LaserWriter printer and Aldus PageMaker to users of the personal computer. During Steve Jobs's hiatus from Apple, a number of different models of Macintosh, including the Macintosh Plus and Macintosh II, were released to a great degree of success. The entire Macintosh line of computers was IBM's major competition up until the early 1990s.

=== 1990s ===
In 1991, the World Wide Web was made available for public use. The combination of powerful personal computers with high-resolution graphics and sound, with the infrastructure provided by the Internet, and the standardization of access methods of the Web browsers, established the foundation for a significant fraction of modern life, from bus time tables through unlimited distribution of free videos through to online user-edited encyclopedias.

== Types ==
=== Desktop ===
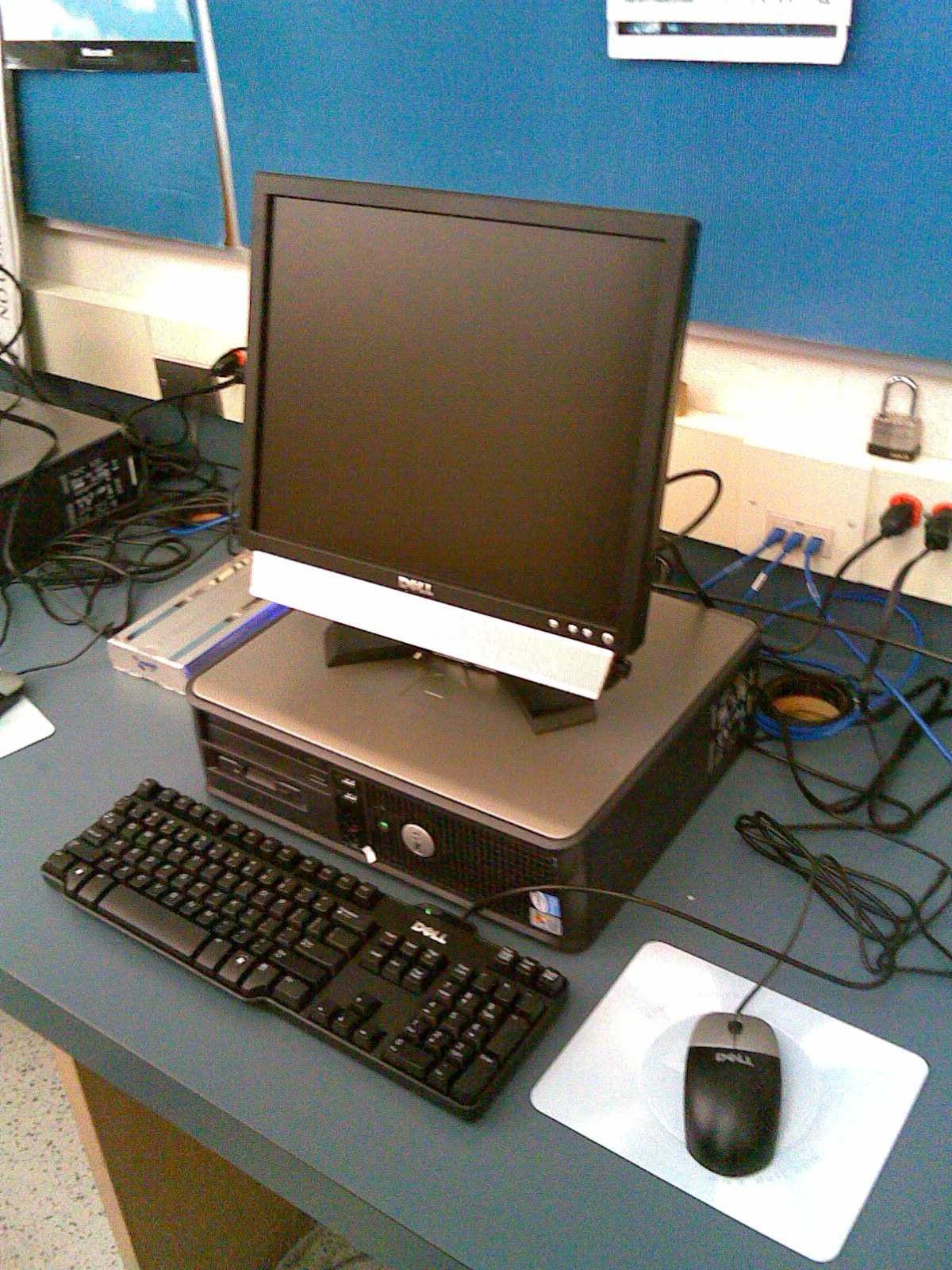
A Dell OptiPlex desktop computer (2006)

Before the widespread use of PCs, a computer that could fit on a desk was remarkably small, leading to the desktop nomenclature. More recently, the phrase usually indicates a particular style of computer case. Desktop computers come in a variety of styles ranging from large vertical tower cases to small models which can be tucked behind or rest directly beneath (and support) LCD monitors.

While the term desktop often refers to a computer with a vertically aligned computer tower case, these varieties often rest on the ground or underneath desks. Despite this seeming contradiction, the term desktop does typically refer to these vertical tower cases as well as the horizontally aligned models which are designed to literally rest on top of desks and are therefore more appropriate to the desktop term, although both types qualify for this desktop label in most practical situations aside from certain physical arrangement differences. Both styles of these computer cases hold the systems hardware components such as the motherboard, processor chip and other internal operating parts. Desktop computers have an external monitor with a display screen and an external keyboard, which are plugged into ports on the back of the computer case. Desktop computers are popular for home and business computing applications as they leave space on the desk for multiple monitors.

A nettop was introduced by Intel in February 2008, characterized by low cost and lean functionality. These were intended to be used with an Internet connection to run Web browsers and Internet applications.

A home theater PC (HTPC) combines the functions of a personal computer and a digital video recorder. It is connected to a TV set or an appropriately sized computer display, and is often used as a digital photo viewer, music and video player, TV receiver, and digital video recorder. HTPCs are also referred to as media center systems or media servers. The goal is to combine many or all components of a home theater setup into one box. HTPCs can also connect to services providing on-demand movies and TV shows. HTPCs can be purchased pre-configured with the required hardware and software needed to add television programming to the PC, or can be assembled from components.

=== Workstation ===
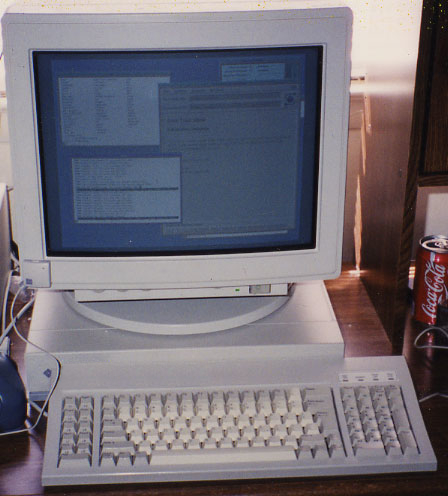
A Sun SPARCstation 1+ from the early 1990s, with a 25 MHz RISC processor

A workstation is a high-end computer designed for technical, mathematical, or scientific applications. Intended primarily to be used by one person at a time, they are commonly connected to a local area network and run multi-user operating systems. Workstations are used for tasks such as computer-aided design, drafting and modeling, computation-intensive scientific and engineering calculations, image processing, architectural modeling, and computer graphics for animation and motion picture visual effects.

=== All-in-one ===
An all-in-one computer (AIO) combines the computer monitor and systems hardware components within a single unit. A separate keyboard and mouse are standard input devices, with some monitors including touchscreen capability. The processor and other working components are typically reduced in size relative to standard desktops, located behind the monitor, and configured similarly to laptops.

Keyboard computers are computers inside of keyboards, generally designed to be connected to an external monitor or television. Examples include the Atari ST, Amstrad CPC, BBC Micro, Commodore 64, MSX, Raspberry Pi 400, and the ZX Spectrum.

=== Portable ===
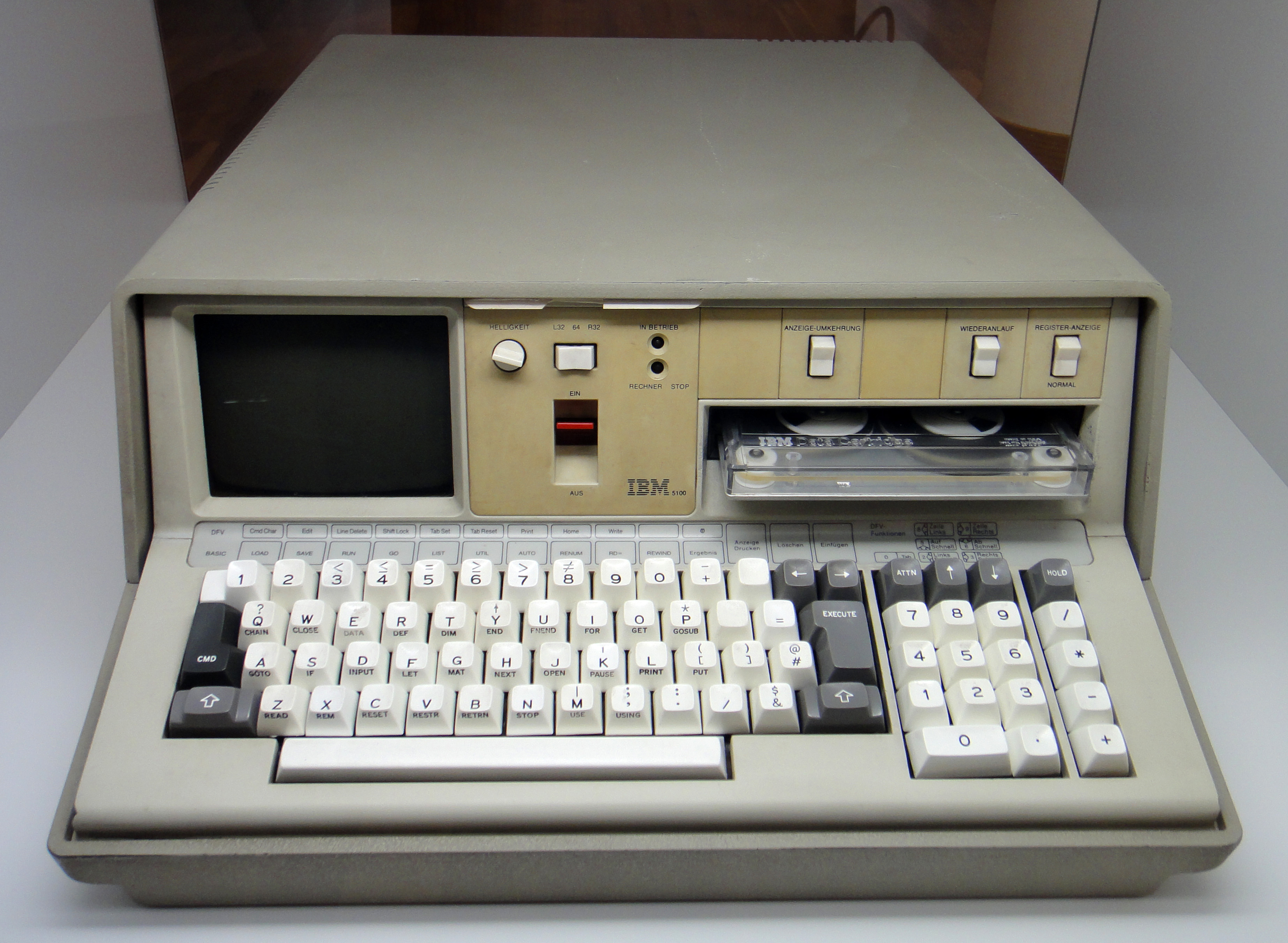
The IBM 5100 from 1975, one of the first portable computers

The potential utility of portable computers was apparent early on. Alan Kay described the Dynabook in 1972, but no hardware was developed. The Xerox NoteTaker was produced in a very small experimental batch around 1978. In 1975, the IBM 5100 could be fit into a transport case, making it a portable computer, but it weighed about 50 pounds. Such early portable computers were termed luggables by journalists owing to their heft.

Before the introduction of the IBM PC, portable computers consisting of a processor, display, disk drives and keyboard, in a suit-case style portable housing, allowed users to bring a computer home from the office or to take notes at a classroom. Examples include the Osborne 1 and Kaypro; and the Commodore SX-64. These machines were AC-powered and included a small CRT display screen. The form factor was intended to allow these systems to be taken on board an airplane as carry-on baggage, though their high power demand meant that they could not be used in flight. The integrated CRT display made for a relatively heavy package, but these machines were more portable than their contemporary desktop equals. Some models had standard or optional connections to drive an external video monitor, allowing a larger screen or use with video projectors.

IBM PC-compatible suitcase format computers became available soon after the introduction of the PC, with the Compaq Portable being a leading example of the type. Later models included a hard drive to give roughly equivalent performance to contemporary desktop computers.

The development of thin plasma display and LCD screens permitted a somewhat smaller form factor, called the lunchbox computer. The screen formed one side of the enclosure, with a detachable keyboard and one or two half-height floppy disk drives, mounted facing the ends of the computer. Some variations included a battery, allowing operation away from AC outlets.

=== Laptop ===
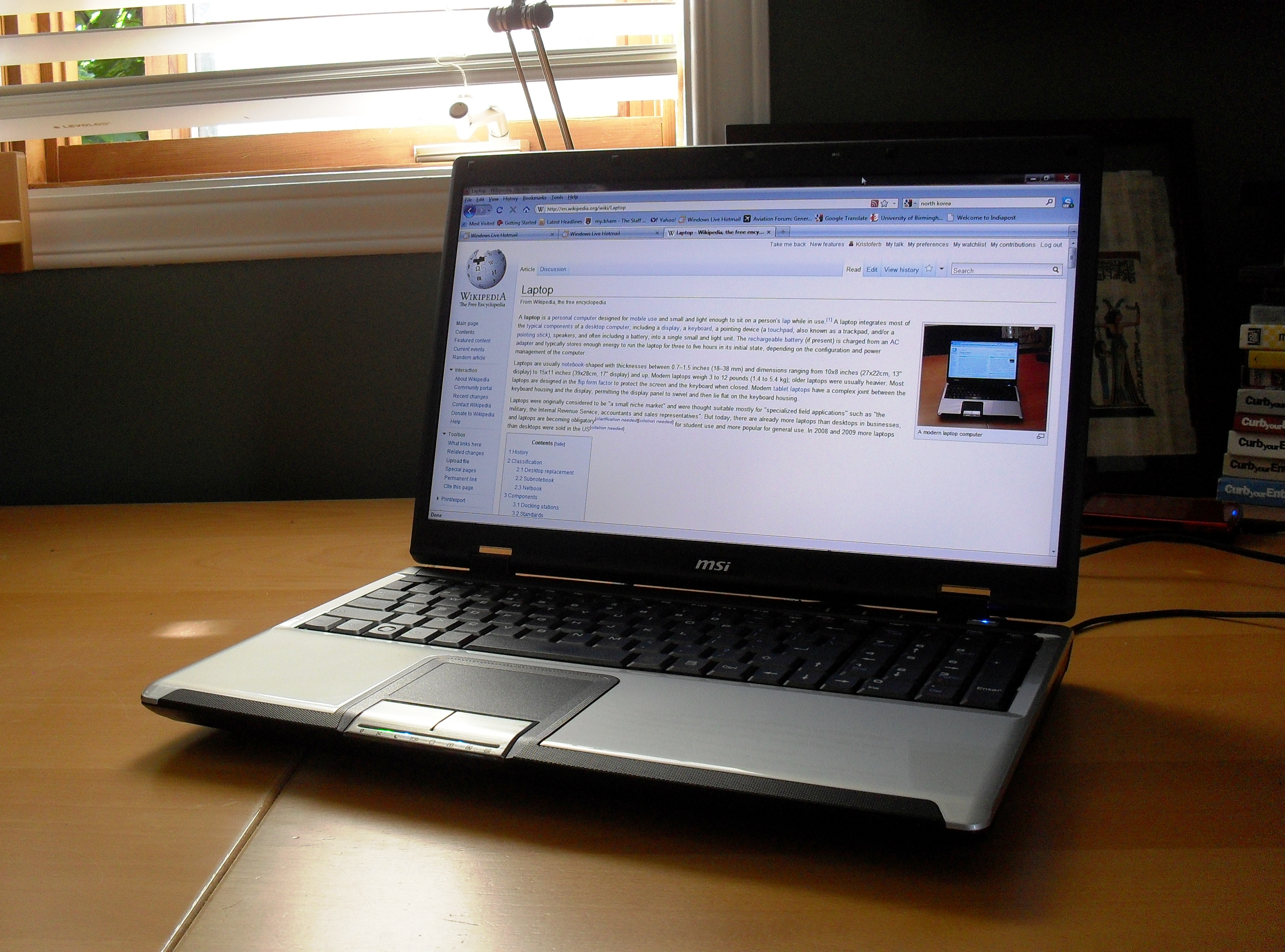
An MSI laptop

A laptop is a type of personal computer designed for portability via its clamshell design, where the keyboard and computer components are on one panel, with a hinged second panel containing a flat display screen. Closing the laptop protects the screen and keyboard during transportation. Laptops generally have a rechargeable battery, enhancing their portability. To save power, weight and space, laptop graphics chips are in many cases integrated into the CPU or chipset and use system RAM, resulting in reduced graphics performance when compared to desktop machines, that more typically have a graphics card installed.

Unlike desktop computers, only minor internal upgrades (such as memory and hard disk drive) are feasible owing to the limited space and power available. Laptops have fewer input and output ports as desktops for connecting to external displays, mice, cameras, storage devices and keyboards. Laptops are also a little more expensive compared to desktops, as the miniaturized components for laptops themselves are expensive.

Notebook computers such as the TRS-80 Model 100 and Epson HX-20 had roughly the plan dimensions of a sheet of typing paper (ANSI A or ISO A4). These machines had a keyboard with slightly reduced dimensions compared to a desktop system, and a fixed LCD screen coplanar with the keyboard. These displays were usually small, with 8 to 16 lines of text, sometimes only 40 columns line length. However, these machines could operate for extended times on disposable or rechargeable batteries. Although they did not usually include internal disk drives, this form factor often included a modem for telephone communication and often had provisions for external cassette or disk storage. Later, clamshell format laptop computers with similar small plan dimensions were also called notebooks.

A mobile workstation provides the full capabilities of a desktop computer, and it usually includes more powerful components and a larger display than generally found in smaller laptops, and may have limited battery capacity or no battery.

Netbooks are a subgroup of laptops suited for general computing tasks and accessing web-based applications. Initially, the primary defining characteristic of netbooks was the lack of an optical disc drive, smaller size, and lower performance than full-size laptops. By mid-2009 netbooks had been offered to users "free of charge", with an extended service contract purchase of a cellular data plan. Netbooks fell out of popularity as a category of laptops by the early 2010s for several reasons, such as poor performance, the rise of tablets and smartphones, and how standard laptops became more powerful and lightweight for daily, portable use. Chromebooks have since filled the gap left by netbooks.

=== 2-in-1 laptop ===
Microsoft's Surface Pro 11 running Windows 11, an example of a detachable laptop.

A 2-in-1 laptop is a hybrid or combination of laptop and tablet computers that has features of both, an example of technological convergence. All 2-in-1 laptops have physical keyboards, but they can be either detached from the chassis ("detachable") or concealed by folding them back and under the touchscreen ("convertible"). They can also display a virtual keyboard on their touchscreens when their physical keyboards are concealed or detached.

Some 2-in-1s have processors and operating systems like those of laptops, such as Windows, while having the flexibility of operation as a tablet. Further, 2-in-1s may have typical laptop I/O ports, such as USB 3 and DisplayPort, and may connect to traditional peripheral devices and external displays. Simple tablets are mainly used as media consumption devices, while 2-in-1s have capacity for both media consumption and content creation.

=== Handheld PC ===
Palmtop PCs were miniature pocket-sized computers running MS-DOS that first came about in the late 1980s, typically in a clamshell form factor with a keyboard. Non-x86 based devices were often called palmtop computers, examples being Psion Series 3. In later years a hardware specification called Handheld PC was later released by Microsoft that run the Windows CE operating system.

Ultra-mobile PC (UMPC) is an obsolete class of personal computers developed by Microsoft, Intel and Samsung, among others. UMPCs typically featured the Windows XP, Windows Vista, Windows 7, or Linux operating system, and low-voltage Intel Atom or VIA C7-M processors. After largely being supplanted by tablet computers and smartphones, production of ultra-mobile PCs was discontinued in the early 2010s.

=== Gaming PC ===
A gaming PC is a specialized personal computer designed to improve the speed and responsiveness of demanding video games and other demanding tasks like video editing. It generally comprises a high-performance video card, processor and RAM. While often in desktop form, gaming PCs may also be laptops or handhelds.

=== Pocket PC ===
A pocket PC is an obsolete hardware specification for a handheld-sized computer (personal digital assistant, PDA) that runs the Microsoft Windows Mobile operating system. It had the capability to run an alternative operating system like NetBSD or Linux. Pocket PCs had many of the capabilities of desktop PCs. Numerous applications were available for handhelds adhering to the Microsoft Pocket PC specification, many of which were freeware. Microsoft-compliant Pocket PCs could also be used with many other add-ons like GPS receivers, barcode readers, RFID readers and cameras.

In 2007, with the release of Windows Mobile 6, Microsoft dropped the name Pocket PC in favor of a new naming scheme: devices without an integrated phone were called Windows Mobile Classic instead of Pocket PC, while devices with an integrated phone and a touch screen were called Windows Mobile Professional.

== Hardware ==
An exploded view of a desktop computer and peripherals (some of which are optional): 1. Scanner; 2. CPU (microprocessor); 3. Memory (RAM); 4. Expansion cards (graphics cards, etc.); 5. Power supply; 6. Optical disc drive; 7. Storage (hard disk or SSD); 8. Motherboard; 9. Speakers; 10. Monitor; 11. System software; 12. Application software; 13. Keyboard; 14. Mouse; 15. External hard disk; 16. Printer

Computer hardware is a comprehensive term for all physical and tangible parts of a computer, as distinguished from the data it contains or operates on, and the software that provides instructions for the hardware to accomplish tasks. Some sub-systems of a personal computer may contain processors that run a fixed program, or firmware, such as a keyboard controller. Firmware usually is not changed by the end user of the personal computer.

Most 2010s and 2020s-era personal computers require users only to plug in the power supply, monitor, and other cables. A typical desktop computer consists of a computer case (or tower), a metal chassis that holds the power supply, motherboard, a storage device such as a hard disk drive (HDD) or solid-state drive (SSD), and previously an optical disc drive. Most towers have empty space where users can add additional components. External devices such as a computer monitor, keyboard, and a pointing device (mouse) are usually found in a desktop computer.

The motherboard connects all processor, memory and peripheral devices together. The RAM, graphics card and processor are in most cases mounted directly onto the motherboard. The central processing unit (microprocessor chip) plugs into a CPU socket, while the ram modules plug into corresponding ram sockets. Some motherboards have the video display adapter, sound and other peripherals integrated onto the motherboard, while others use expansion slots for graphics cards, network cards, or other input/output devices. The graphics card or sound card may employ a break out box to keep the analog parts away from the electromagnetic radiation inside the computer case. Disk drives, which provide mass storage, are connected to the motherboard with one cable, and to the power supply through another cable. Usually, disk drives are mounted in the same case as the motherboard; expansion chassis are also made for additional disk storage.

For large amounts of data, a tape drive can be used or extra hard disks can be put together in an external case. The keyboard and the mouse are external devices plugged into the computer through connectors on an I/O panel on the back of the computer case. The monitor is also connected to the input/output (I/O) panel, either through an onboard port on the motherboard, or a port on the graphics card. Capabilities of the personal computer's hardware can sometimes be extended by the addition of expansion cards connected via an expansion bus. Standard peripheral buses often used for adding expansion cards in personal computers include PCI, PCI Express (PCIe), and AGP (a high-speed PCI bus dedicated to graphics adapters, found in older computers). Most modern personal computers have multiple physical PCI Express expansion slots, with some having PCI slots as well.

A peripheral is a device connected to a computer to provide communication (such as input and output) or auxiliary functions (such as additional storage). Peripherals generally connect to the computer through the use of USB ports or inputs located on the I/O panel. USB flash drives provide portable storage using flash memory which allows users to access the files stored on the drive on any computer. Memory cards also provide portable storage for users, commonly used on other electronics such as mobile phones and digital cameras, the information stored on these cards can be accessed using a memory card reader to transfer data between devices. Webcams, which are either built into computer hardware or connected via USB, are video cameras that record video in real time to either be saved to the computer or streamed somewhere else over the internet. Game controllers can be plugged in via USB and can be used as an input device for video games as an alternative to using keyboard and mouse. Headphones and speakers can be connected via USB or through an auxiliary port (found on I/O panel) and allow users to listen to audio accessed on their computer; however, speakers may also require an additional power source to operate. Microphones can be connected through an audio input port on the I/O panel and allow the computer to convert sound into an electrical signal to be used or transmitted by the computer.

== Software ==
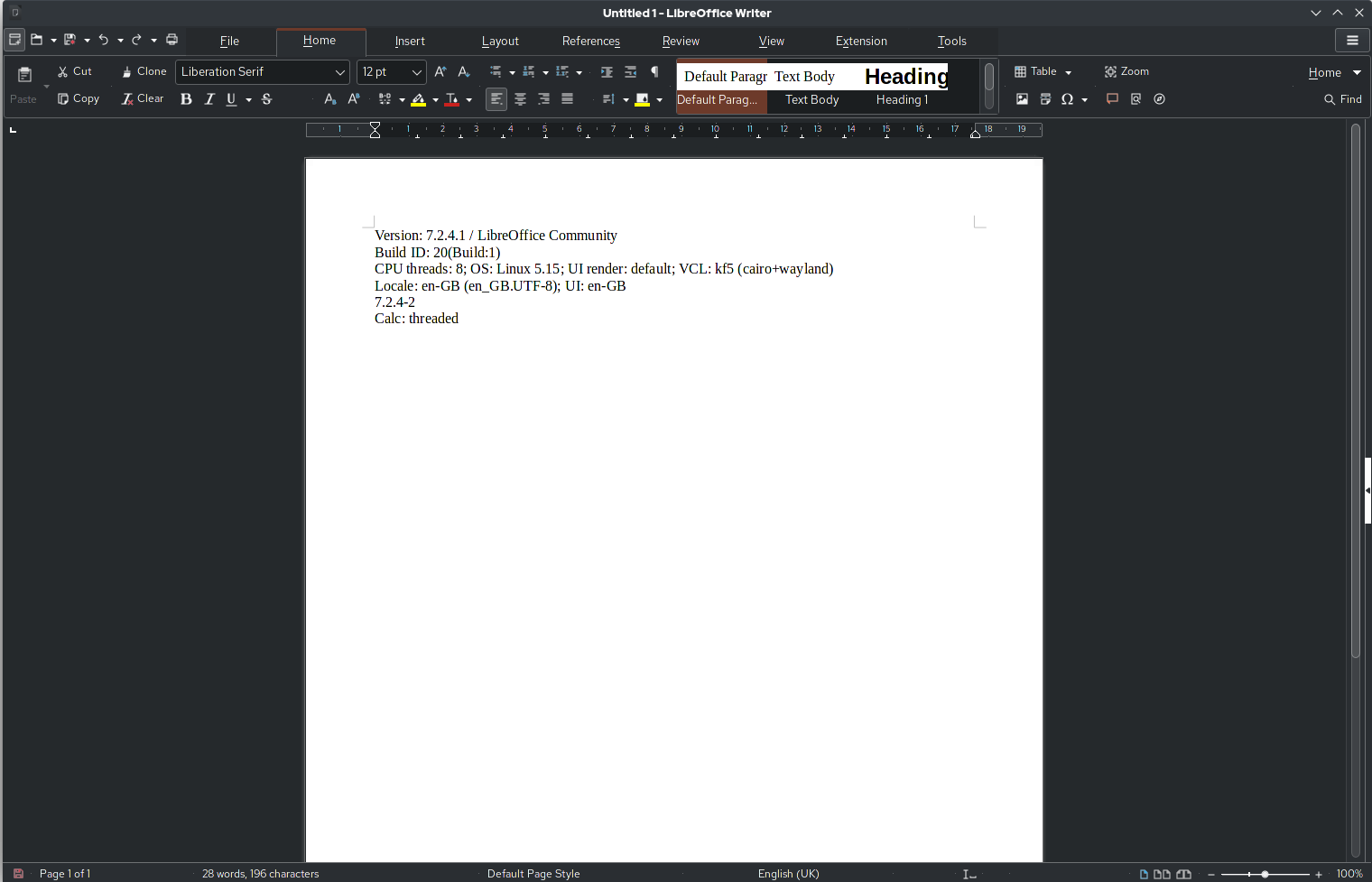
A screenshot of the LibreOffice Writer software

Computer software is any kind of computer program, procedure, or documentation that performs some task on a computer system. The term includes application software such as word processors that perform productive tasks for users, system software such as operating systems that interface with computer hardware to provide the necessary services for application software, and middleware that controls and co-ordinates distributed systems.

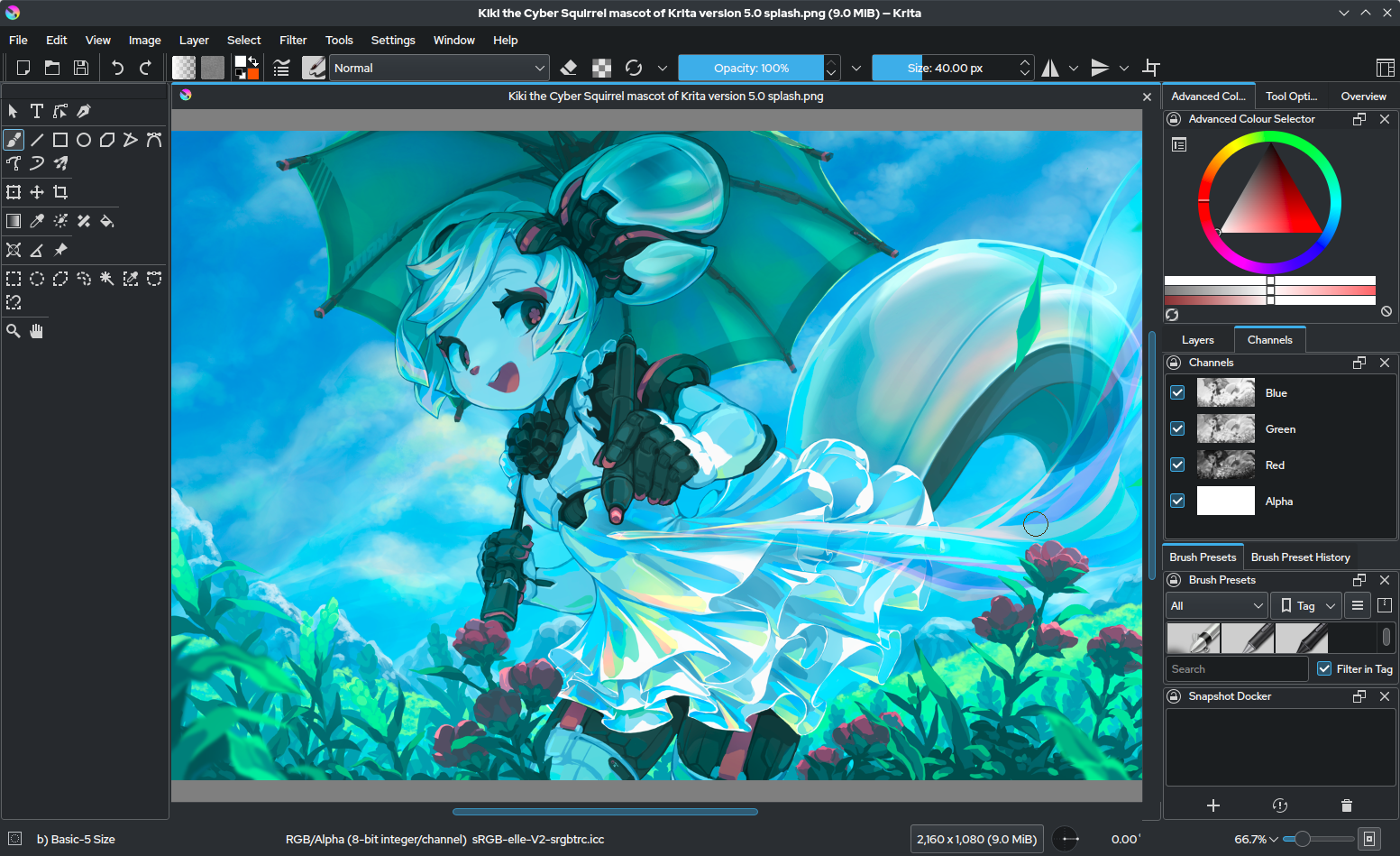
A screenshot of Krita, which is a raster graphics editor

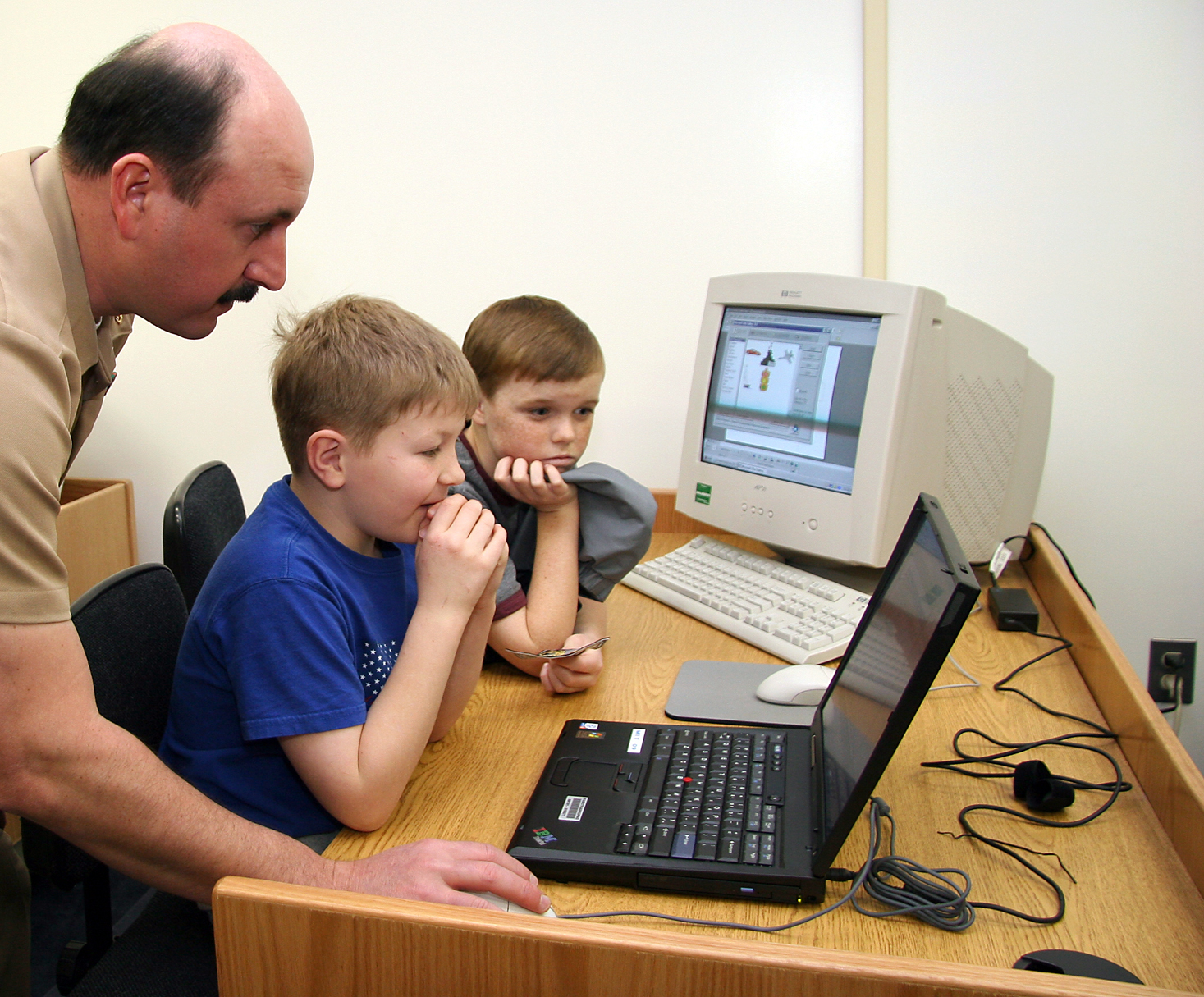
Children being taught how to use a laptop computer in 2005. An older (1990s-era) desktop personal computer's CRT monitor is visible in the background.

Software applications are common for word processing, Internet browsing, Internet faxing, e-mail and other digital messaging, multimedia playback, playing of computer game, and computer programming. The user may have significant knowledge of the operating environment and application programs, but is not necessarily interested in programming nor even able to write programs for the computer. Therefore, most software written primarily for personal computers tends to be designed with simplicity of use, or user-friendliness in mind. However, the software industry continuously provide a wide range of new products for use in personal computers, targeted at both the expert and the non-expert user.

Institutional or corporate computer owners in the 1960s had to write their own programs to do any useful work with computers. While personal computer users may develop their own applications, these systems most frequently run commercial or free-of-charge software ("freeware"), which commonly has closed source (proprietary) codebases; or free and open-source software, where the source code is made freely available. Software for end-users is typically provided in binary (ready-to-run) form. Software for personal computers is typically developed and distributed independently from the hardware or operating system manufacturers. Practically all personal computer users no longer need to create programs themselves to make any use of a personal computer, although end-user programming is still feasible. This contrasts with mobile systems, where software is often available only through a manufacturer-supported channel and end-user program development may be discouraged by lack of support by the manufacturer.

=== Operating system ===
An operating system (OS) manages computer resources and provides programmers with an interface used to access those resources. An operating system processes system data and user input, and responds by allocating and managing tasks and internal system resources as a service to users and programs of the system. An operating system performs basic tasks such as controlling and allocating memory, prioritizing system requests, controlling input/output devices, facilitating computer networking, and managing files.

Common contemporary desktop operating systems are Microsoft Windows, macOS, Linux (including ChromeOS and Googlebook OS), Solaris and FreeBSD. Windows, macOS, and Linux all have server and personal variants. With the exception of Microsoft Windows, the designs of each of them were inspired by or directly inherited from the Unix operating system.

Early personal computers used operating systems that supported command line interaction, using an alphanumeric display and keyboard. The user had to remember a large range of commands to, for example, open a file for editing or to move text from one place to another. Starting in the early 1960s, the advantages of a graphical user interface began to be explored, but widespread adoption required lower-cost graphical display equipment. By 1984, mass-market computer systems using graphical user interfaces were available; by the turn of the 21st century, text-mode operating systems were no longer a significant fraction of the personal computer market.

=== Applications ===
Generally, a computer user uses application software to carry out a specific task. System software supports applications and provides common services such as memory management, network connectivity and device drivers, all of which may be used by applications but are not directly of interest to the end user. A simplified analogy in the world of hardware would be the relationship of an electric light bulb (an application) to an electric power generation plant (a system): the power plant merely generates electricity, not itself of any real use until harnessed to an application like the electric light that performs a service that benefits the user.

Typical examples of software applications are word processors, spreadsheets, and media players. Multiple applications bundled together as a package are sometimes referred to as an application suite. Microsoft Office and LibreOffice, which bundle together a word processor, a spreadsheet, and several other discrete applications, are typical examples. The separate applications in a suite usually have a user interface that has some commonality making it easier for the user to learn and use each application. Often, they may have some capability to interact with each other in ways beneficial to the user; for example, a spreadsheet might be able to be embedded in a word processor document even though it had been created in the separate spreadsheet application.

End-user development tailors systems to meet the user's specific needs. User-written software include spreadsheet templates, word processor macros, scientific simulations, graphics and animation scripts; even email filters are a kind of user software. Users create this software themselves and often overlook how important it is.

=== Gaming ===
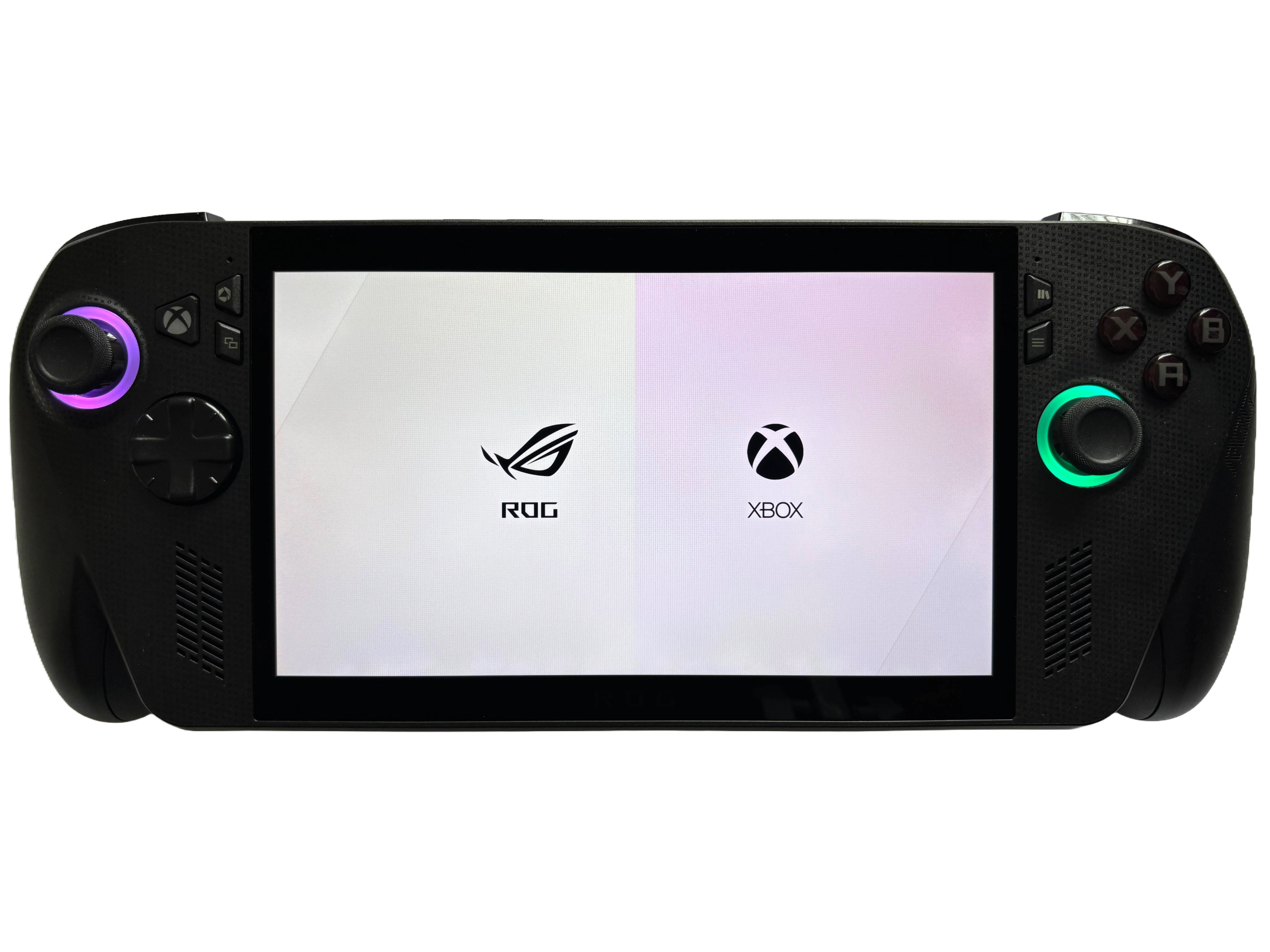
ROG Xbox Ally, a handheld gaming computer co-developed by Microsoft and Asus.

PC gaming is popular among the high-end PC market. PC gaming is at the forefront of competitive gaming, known as esports, with games such as League of Legends, Dota 2 and Counter-Strike: Global Offensive leading the industry that is suspected to surpass a billion dollars in revenue in 2019. According to an April 2018 market analysis done by Newzoo, PC gaming was the third largest gaming sector behind console and mobile gaming in terms of market share sitting at a 24% share of the entire market. The market for PC gaming continues to grow and is expected to generate $32.3 billion in revenue in the year 2021. According to a December 2023 market analysis done by Visual Capitalist, the PC gaming sector was the second-largest category across all platforms as of 2022, valued at US$45 billion, surpassing console market revenue by 2020.

There are multiple different game distributors; players are able to purchase games in-person at retail stores and digitally. Some large names for digital game distributors are Epic Games, Valve Corporation, Electronic Arts, and Ubisoft. Distributors such as the ones listed allow many games to be purchasable and accessible to users. Though some distributors may only sell games that have been created by their own company, many games and franchises are available on multiple distributor platforms. Some multiplayer pc games can also be cross-platform, allowing players the ability the play with other platforms, such as pc and different consoles. There are games on distributor platforms that may allow players to play other known games using the game application as an emulator; these games originally may not be supported by the player's current device, whether it be platform locked or no longer supported by the operating system of the pc. The number of different video game genres can range across each distributor platform, first-person shooters, MMO games, adventure games, etc. Many games, frequently free-to-play games, have microtransactions available for players. These transactions can help enhance gameplay or to personalize their characters. There are games such as The Sims that allow players to purchase additional game packs in order to gain access to additional new gameplay.

== Sales ==
=== Market share ===
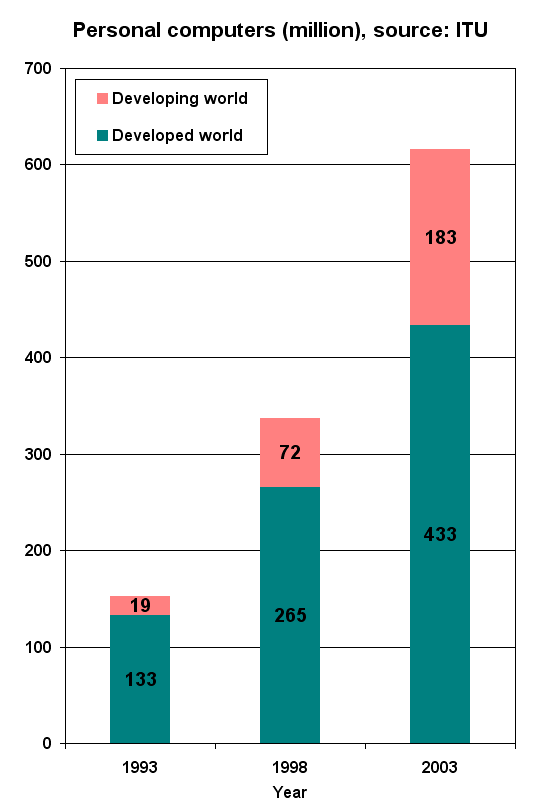
Personal computers worldwide in million distinguished by developed and developing world

In 2001, 125 million personal computers were shipped in comparison to 48,002 in 1977. More than 500 million personal computers were in use in 2002 and one billion personal computers had been sold worldwide from the mid-1970s up to this time (year 2002). Of the latter figure, 75% were professional or work related, while the rest were sold for personal or home use. About 81.5% of personal computers shipped had been desktop computers, 16.4% laptops and 2.1% servers. The United States had received 38.8% (394 million) of the computers shipped, Europe 25% and 11.7% had gone to the Asia-Pacific region, the fastest-growing market as of 2002. The second billion was expected to be sold by 2008. Almost half of all households in Western Europe had a personal computer and a computer could be found in 40% of homes in United Kingdom, compared with only 13% in 1985.

The global personal computer shipments were 350.9 million units in 2010, 308.3 million units in 2009 and 302.2 million units in 2008. The shipments were 264 million units in the year 2007, according to iSuppli, up 11.2% from 239 million in 2006. In 2004, the global shipments were 183 million units, an 11.6% increase over 2003. In 2003, 152.6 million computers were shipped, at an estimated value of $175 billion. In 2002, 136.7 million PCs were shipped, at an estimated value of $175 billion. In 2000, 140.2 million personal computers were shipped, at an estimated value of $226 billion. Worldwide shipments of personal computers surpassed the 100-million mark in 1999, growing to 113.5 million units from 93.3 million units in 1998. In 1999, Asia had 14.1 million units shipped.

As of June 2008, the number of personal computers in use worldwide hit one billion, while another billion is expected to be reached by 2014. Mature markets like the United States, Western Europe and Japan accounted for 58% of the worldwide installed PCs. The emerging markets were expected to double their installed PCs by 2012 and to take 70% of the second billion PCs. About 180 million computers (16% of the existing installed base) were expected to be replaced and 35 million to be dumped into landfill in 2008. The whole installed base grew 12% annually.

Based on International Data Corporation (IDC) data for Q2 2011, for the first time China surpassed US in PC shipments by 18.5 million and 17.7 million respectively. This trend reflects the rising of emerging markets as well as the relative stagnation of mature regions.

Besides the regular computer manufacturers, companies making especially rugged versions of computers have sprung up, offering alternatives for people operating their machines in extreme weather or environments.

In 2011, Deloitte consulting firm predicted that, smartphones and tablet computers as computing devices would surpass the PCs sales (as has happened since 2012). As of 2013, worldwide sales of PCs had begun to fall as many consumers moved to tablets and smartphones. Sales of 90.3 million units in the fourth quarter of 2012 represented a 4.9% decline from sales in the fourth quarter of 2011. Global PC sales fell sharply in the first quarter of 2013, according to IDC data. The 14% year-over-year decline was the largest on record since the firm began tracking in 1994, and double what analysts had been expecting. The decline of Q2 2013 PC shipments marked the fifth straight quarter of falling sales. "This is horrific news for PCs", remarked an analyst. "It's all about mobile computing now. We have definitely reached the tipping point." Data from Gartner showed a similar decline for the same time period. China's Lenovo Group bucked the general trend as strong sales to first-time buyers in the developing world allowed the company's sales to stay flat overall. Windows 8, which was designed to look similar to tablet/smartphone software, was cited as a contributing factor in the decline of new PC sales. "Unfortunately, it seems clear that the Windows 8 launch not only didn't provide a positive boost to the PC market, but appears to have slowed the market," said IDC Vice President Bob O'Donnell.

In August 2013, Credit Suisse published research findings that attributed around 75% of the operating profit share of the PC industry to Microsoft (operating system) and Intel (semiconductors). According to IDC, in 2013 PC shipments dropped by 9.8% as the greatest drop-ever in line with consumers trends to use mobile devices.

In the second quarter of 2018, PC sales grew for the first time since the first quarter of 2012. According to research firm Gartner, the growth mainly came from the business market while the consumer market experienced decline.

In 2020, as the result of the COVID-19 pandemic with more people working at home and learning remotely, PC sales grew by 26.1% compared to previous years according to IDC. According to Canalys, 2020 was the highest growth rate for the PC market since 2011.

This upward trend continued into 2021, with global PC shipments reaching over 340 million units, the highest since 2012, representing a 14.6% year-over-year growth. Notebooks and mobile workstations led the charge, with shipments growing 16% to reach 275 million units, while desktops and desktop workstations increased 7% to reach 66 million units. Major vendors such as Lenovo, HP, Dell, and Apple all saw significant increases in sales.

The market saw increased demand not only from consumers and students but also from businesses investing in hybrid work infrastructure. However, by late 2022, the market began to stabilize as demand cooled down and supply chain challenges, including chip shortages, began to ease. Worldwide shipments of desktop and laptop computers fell by 19.5% in the third quarter of 2022 compared with the year-ago period, marking the steepest decline Gartner has documented in more than two decades of tracking the market.

After a period of volatility, the global PC market began to stabilize in 2023. According to IDC, worldwide PC shipments during the fourth quarter of 2024 grew 1.8% year-over-year, reaching 68.9 million units. Canalys reported a 3.2% annual growth in the first quarter of 2024, totaling 57.2 million units, with notebook shipments increasing by 4.2%.

In the first quarter of 2025, global PC shipments experienced a significant uptick, growing 9.4% year-over-year to 62.7 million units. This surge was partly attributed to manufacturers accelerating shipments to the U.S. ahead of newly implemented tariffs under President Donald Trump's trade policies. Lenovo maintained its lead in the global PC market, shipping 15.2 million units with an 11% growth, followed by HP with 12.8 million units (6% growth), Dell with 9.5 million units (3% growth), and Apple with 6.5 million units, marking a 22% increase. The integration of artificial intelligence (AI) capabilities into PCs emerged as a significant trend during this period.

=== Average selling price ===
Selling prices of personal computers steadily declined due to lower costs of production and manufacture, while the capabilities of computers increased. In 1975, an Altair kit sold for around only US$400, but required customers to solder components into circuit boards; peripherals required to interact with the system in alphanumeric form instead of blinking lights would add another $2,000, and the resultant system was of use only to hobbyists.

At their introduction in 1981, the US$1,795 price of the Osborne 1 and its competitor Kaypro was considered an attractive price point; these systems had text-only displays and only floppy disks for storage. By 1982, Michael Dell observed that a personal computer system selling at retail for about US$3,000 was made of components that cost the dealer about $600; typical gross margin on a computer unit was around $1,000. The total value of personal computer purchases in the US in 1983 was about $4 billion. By late 1998, the average selling price of personal computer systems in the United States had dropped below $1,000.

For Microsoft Windows systems, the average selling price (ASP) showed a decline in 2008/2009, possibly due to low-cost netbooks, drawing $569 for desktop computers and $689 for laptops at U.S. retail in August 2008. In 2009, ASP had further fallen to $533 for desktops and to $602 for notebooks by January and to $540 and 560 in February. According to research firm NPD, the average selling price of all Windows portable PCs has fallen from $659 in October 2008 to $519 in October 2009.

== Environmental impact ==
External costs of environmental impact are not fully included in the selling price of personal computers.

Personal computers have become a large contributor to the 50 million tons of discarded electronic waste generated annually, according to the United Nations Environment Programme. To address the electronic waste issue affecting developing countries and the environment, extended producer responsibility (EPR) acts have been implemented in various countries and states. In the absence of comprehensive national legislation or regulation on the export and import of electronic waste, the Silicon Valley Toxics Coalition and BAN (Basel Action Network) teamed up with electronic recyclers in the US and Canada to create an e-steward program for the orderly disposal of electronic waste.

== See also ==
- ATX
- List of computer system manufacturers
- List of home computers
- Market share of personal computer vendors
- Mobile device
- Personal Computer Museum
- Pocket computer
- Post-PC era
- Public computer
- Quiet PC
- x86-64
