= Osborne PC =

Prototype IBM PC compatible

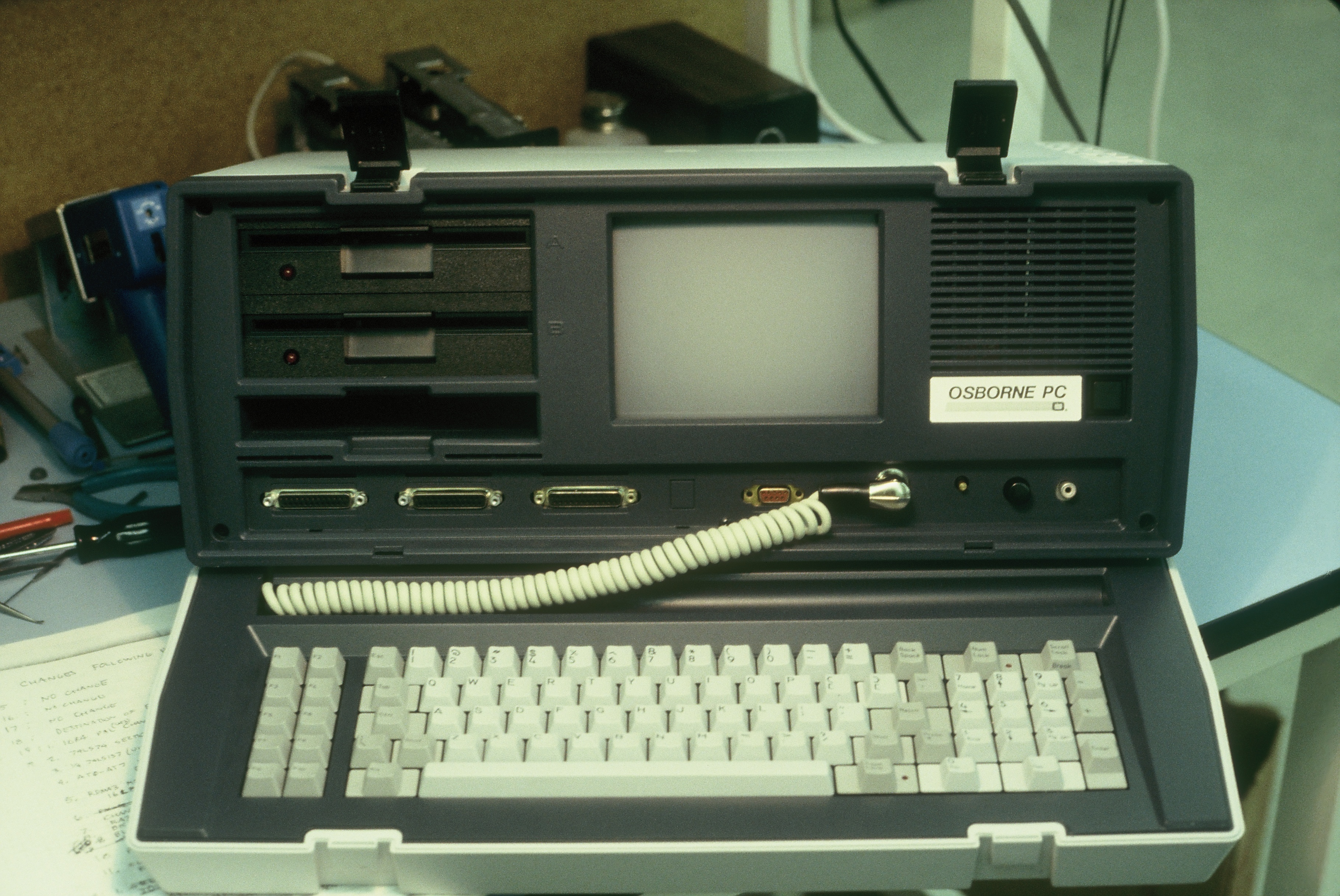
- Osborne PC prototype
- Developer: Osborne Computer Corporation
- Type: Portable computer
- Released: 1984 (never released)
- Operating system: DOS; CP/M-86
- CPU: Intel 8088 @ 4.77 MHz

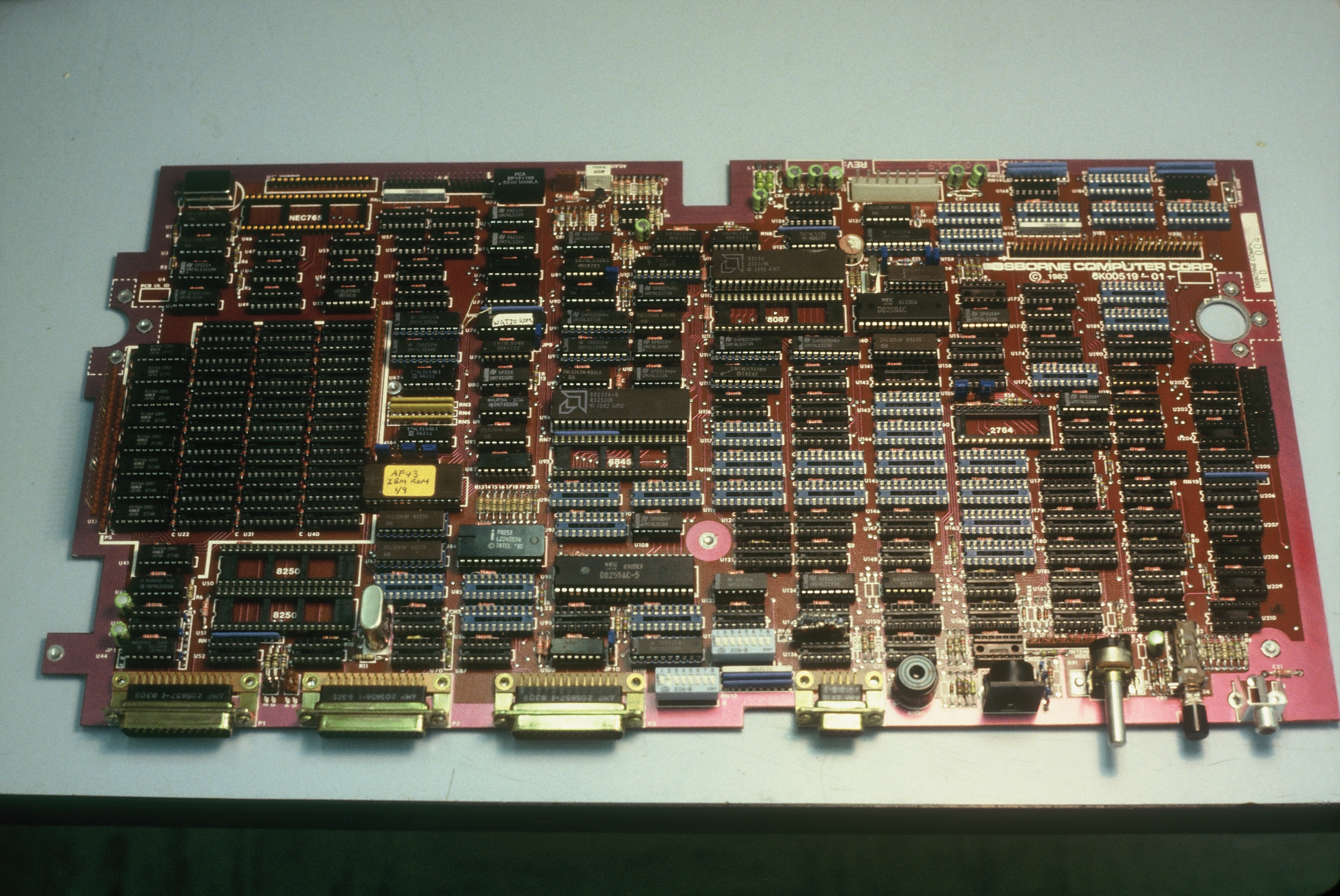
Osborne PC Compatible prototype printed circuit board

The Osborne PC is an unreleased IBM PC–compatible personal computer developed between 1983 and 1984 by Osborne Computer Corporation. Only prototypes of the computer were ever produced.

== History ==
In April 1983, Osborne introduced their Executive, the successor to their highly successful Osborne 1 portable computer. Both the aforementioned computers were Z80-based and ran the CP/M operating system. Announced simultaneously was the Executive II, which was to be the company's first computer compatible with the IBM PC. The Executive II was slated to be a dual-processor machine, with both an 8088 and a Z80, allowing it to be both PC-compatible and capable of running CP/M. By July 1983, however, the Executive II had no scheduled release date.

Internally within Osborne, an effort was launched in the early summer of 1983 to raise the amount of capital necessary to produce a functional prototype for the Executive II. Although venture partners had contributed $9 million of funding in April and another $11 million in June, Osborne was unable to raise an additional $20 million considered necessary to get the IBM-compatible product to market. A team was formed primarily to create a prototype DOS compatible printed circuit board and front bezel to accommodate the changes in connectors. Lee Felsenstein, who designed the Osborne 1 from the ground up and contributor to the design of the Executive, was hired on a freelance basis to work on the PC prototype. Its design used many of the parts of the Executive, including the disc drives, display, chassis, power supply and keyboard. It was completed in six weeks and shown to a number of potential investors, but was unable to generate sufficient interest to save the company from bankruptcy. Shortly before they filed Chapter 11, on 5 September, Osborne had announced a replacement motherboard for the original Executive based on this PCB design that would have turned it into a PC compatible.

== Production shutdown ==
On 2 August, the company's New Jersey plant was shut down and 89 workers were laid off. A few days later 200 workers were let go from the Hayward, California, facility. In early September, banks seized the company's accounts receivable. On 9 September an additional 270 more workers were fired and all production ceased, leaving 80 employees on the California payroll. Three days later, on 12 September, Porter Hurt filed suit for $4.5 million owed his firms for PC boards. On 13 September 1983, OCC filed for Chapter 11 protection in Oakland, California, federal bankruptcy court, listing assets of $40 million, liabilities of $45 million, and 600 creditors.

== Failed revival ==
While under bankruptcy protection, Osborne's founder Adam Osborne stepped down as CEO and was replaced by Ronald J. Brown, formerly the head of Osborne's international subsidiary. Brown submitted a strategy for exiting bankruptcy to California courts, which was approved in April 1984. Part of the strategy was to revive the Osborne PC project. With Felsenstein still on board as a freelance designer, the Osborne PC was formally announced in April 1984, with an estimated price tag of less than US$3,000, weighing around 28 pounds (13 kg) and possessing two 5.25-inch floppy disks, 256 KB of RAM, and a 7-inch amber-phosphor CRT display. The Osborne PC appeared at the summer 1984 West Coast Computer Faire, where Jerry Pournelle (writing in Byte) remarked that it "looked a lot like the older Executive" and saw it running Microsoft Flight Simulator.

In December 1984, PC World reported that enthusiasm in the original Osborne PC project had waned and that there was only a "50 percent" chance it would survive. In the interim, the company licensed the Pivot portable computer from Morrow Designs and resold it as the Osborne 3. In late 1985, the company released a PC-compatible desktop computer. Called the Osborne 2100, it was manufactured in Taiwan and features a NEC V20 processor (compatible with the 8088).
