= Osborne Vixen =

Portable computer released in 1984

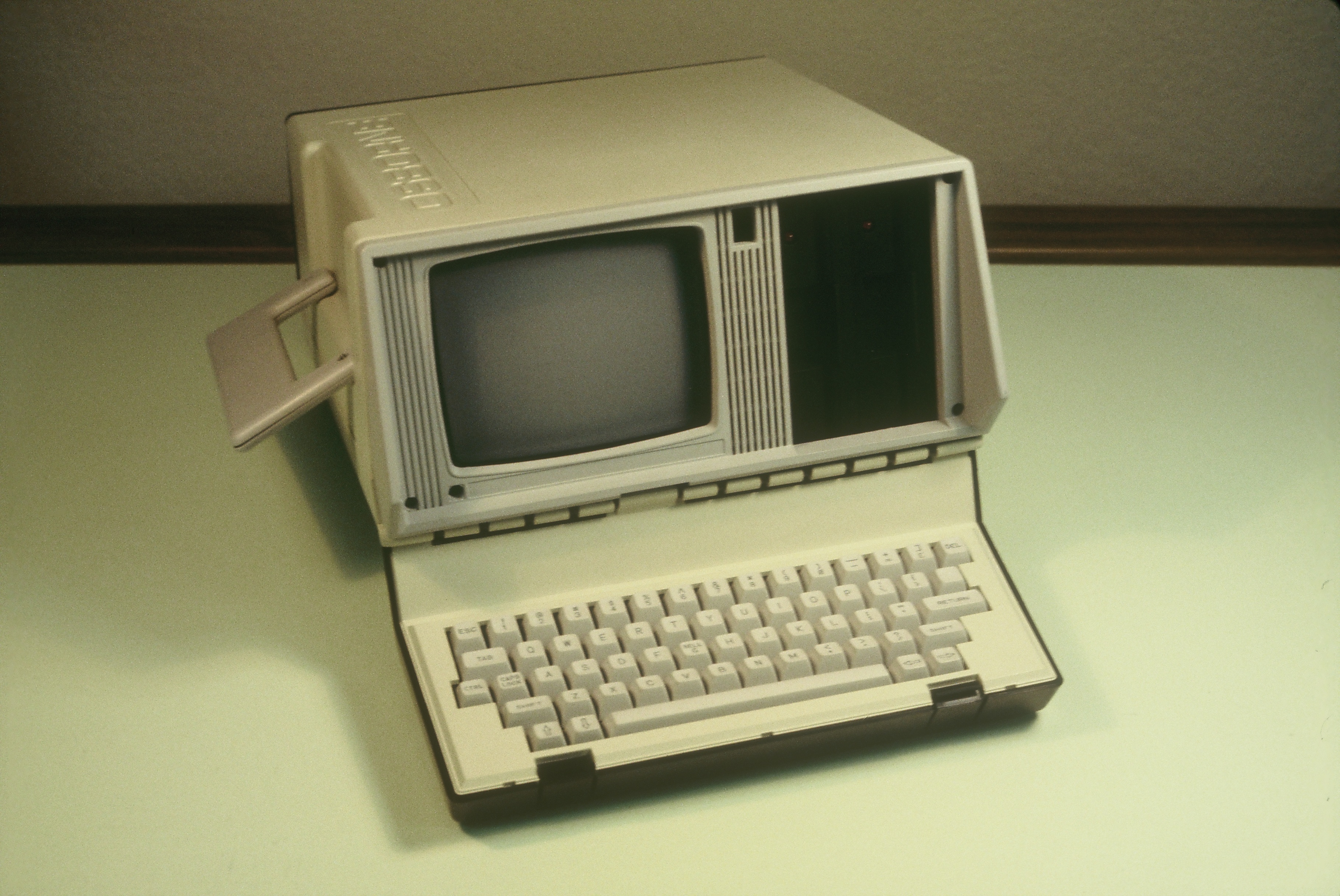
- Also known as: Osborne 4
- Developer: Adam Osborne
- Type: Portable computer
- Released: 1984
- Introductory price: US$1,298 (equivalent to $3,900 in 2024)
- Operating system: CP/M, CP/M Plus
- CPU: Zilog Z80 @ 4 MHz
- Memory: 64 KB
- Storage: Two half-height DSDD 5.25-inch floppy drives
- Display: 7-inch amber monochrome CRT, 80 × 24 character text
- Connectivity: Serial port, Parallel port
- Weight: 18 lb (8.2 kg)
- Predecessor: Osborne Executive

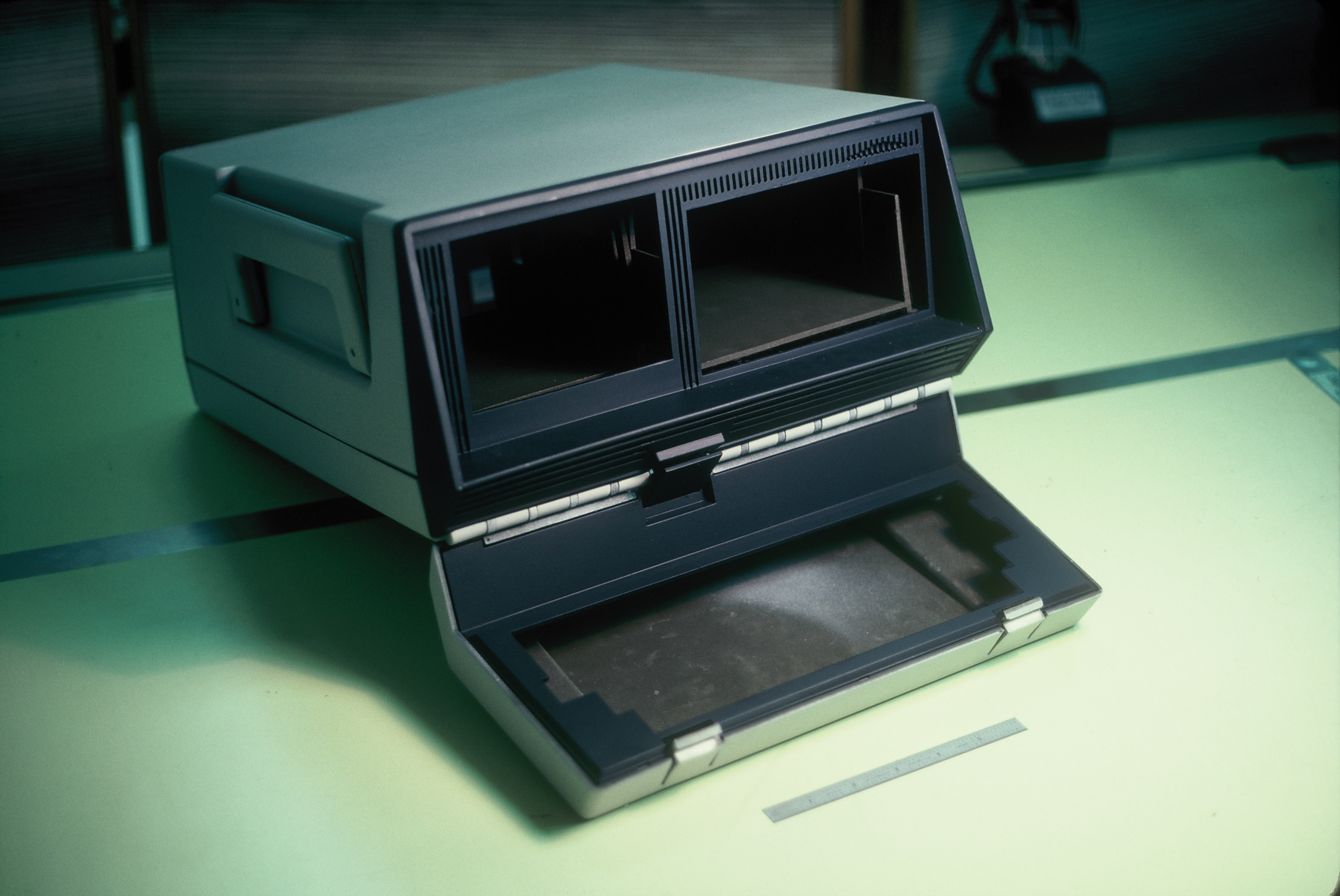
Osborne Vixen enclosure

The Osborne Vixen is a "luggable" portable computer announced by the Osborne Computer Corporation in November 1984, as a follow-up to their Osborne 1 and Osborne Executive system.

The Vixen has a 4 MHz Zilog Z80 microprocessor with 64 KB dynamic random-access memory (DRAM) and 4 KB EPROM. It has a 7-inch diagonal amber display that can show 24 lines by 80 columns of memory mapped video. It uses two 400 KB disk drives, utilizing double-density double-sided 5.25" diskettes. As a luggable, it weighs about 18 pounds. Contemporary advertising pointed out that it could fit under the seat in an airplane, with dimensions of 12 5/8 by 16 1/4 by 6 1/4 inches (321 by 413 by 159 mm).

When it was released, the Vixen had a retail price of $1298. Customers also had the option of purchasing an external 10 megabyte hard disk for $1495.

The Vixen used version 2.2 of the CP/M operating system. It was also bundled with a number of software packages: WordStar, the popular word processing package; SuperCalc, a spreadsheet; MBASIC, a programming language; Osboard, a graphics and drawing program; TurnKey, a system utility; Media Master, a data interchange program that allowed compatibility with over "200 other computers"; and Desolation, a game.

The Vixen was also known as the Osborne 4. It was developed and released after the bankruptcy of the Osborne Computer Corporation. An earlier system also called "Vixen" was never released. Due to technical problems with prototypes and the corporate bankruptcy, by the time the CP/M Vixen was introduced, it had already been made obsolete by MS-DOS IBM PC compatibles. A last ditch effort to design and market a fully IBM PC compatible produced three prototypes, but too late to save the company from bankruptcy.

== Software ==
Program Name	Version	Published by	Program Type
Desolation			Game
Osboard Software			Graphics
WordStar/MailMerge	3.3	MicroPro International	Application
SuperCalc	2	Sorcim	Application
MBASIC		Microsoft	Application
Media Master			Utility
TurnKey			Utility
