= Osborne Executive =

Portable computer released in 1983

Executive
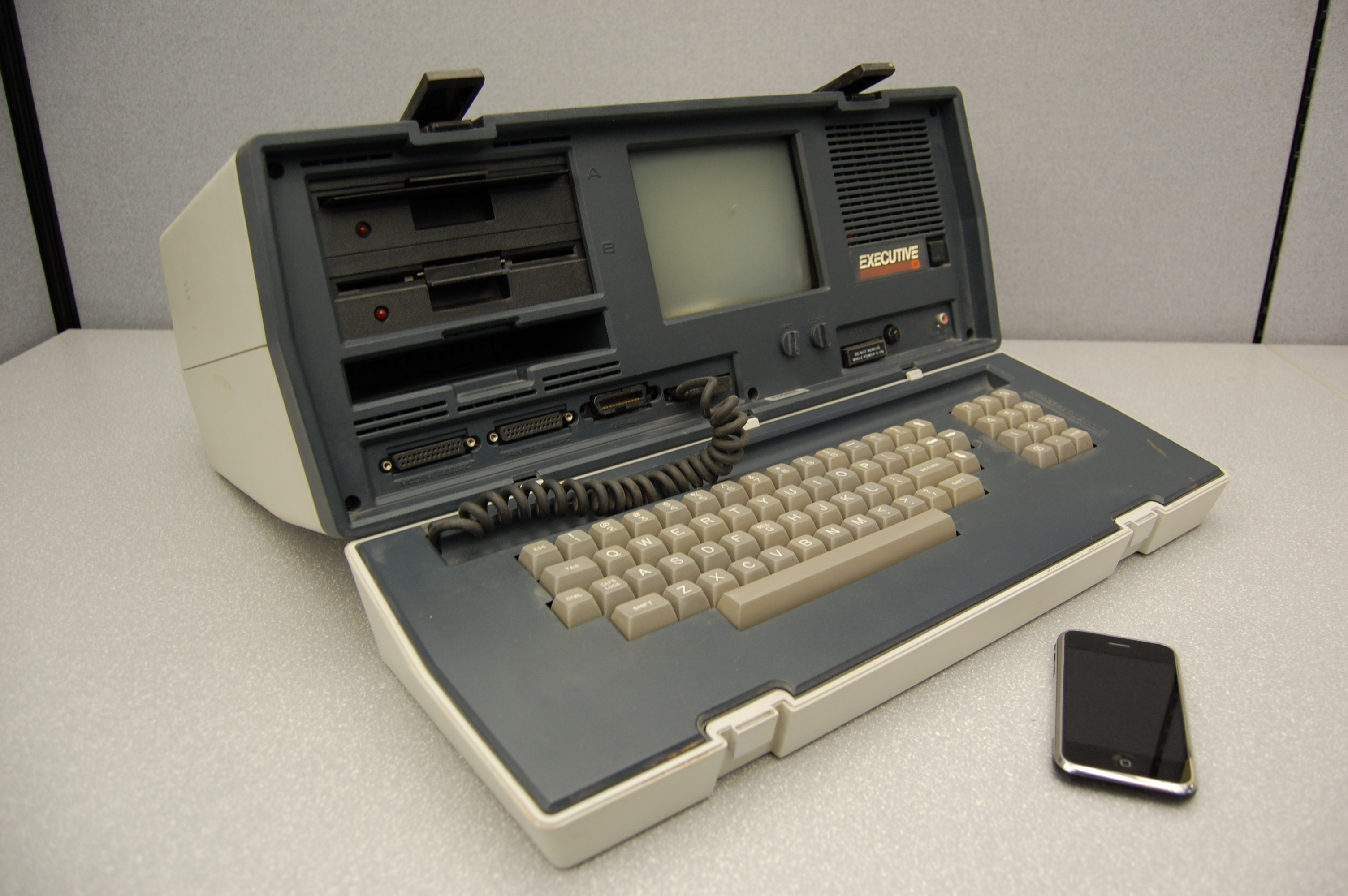
- Also known as: OCC-2
- Developer: Adam Osborne
- Manufacturer: Osborne Computer Corporation
- Type: Portable computer
- Released: April 1983; 42 years ago
- Introductory price: US$2,495 (equivalent to $7,880 in 2024)
- Discontinued: 1983 (bankruptcy)
- Units sold: 10,000+
- Operating system: CP/M Plus
- CPU: Zilog Z80A @ 4 MHz
- Memory: 124 KB RAM
- Storage: Dual 5¼-inch, single-sided, double-density floppy drives
- Display: 7-inch monochrome built-in monitor, 80 × 24 characters text
- Sound: Built-in beeper
- Power: PSU built-in, 110 / 220 V
- Dimensions: W: 20.5 inches (52 cm); H: 9 inches (23 cm); D: 13 inches (33 cm)
- Weight: 28 lb (13 kg)
- Predecessor: Osborne 1
- Successor: Osborne Vixen

The Osborne Executive, released in April 1983, was the successor to the Osborne 1 portable computer. Produced by the Osborne Computer Corporation, the Executive offered numerous improvements over the already successful Osborne 1, including a 7-inch amber phosphor CRT display and more space efficient half-height 5 ¼ disk drives.

The Osborne Executive, like the Osborne 1, came with application software. Its software bundle included the WordStar word processor, SuperCalc spreadsheet, and the CBASIC and MBASIC programming languages. The included software packages were all leading applications in their respective fields at the time, and had a retail value of more than US$2,495.

The case of the Executive is very similar to that of the revised Osborne 1, with the keyboard acting as both a cover for the display and disk drives as well as a stand for the main unit. Unlike the Osborne 1, the Executive features a cooling fan and air filter underneath the rear case carry-handle.

== Software ==
The operating system is CP/M version 3.0 (CP/M Plus). A complete listing of the ROM BIOS is available in the Osborne technical manual. Unlike version 2.2, this edition of CP/M supports bank switching memory, which allows compatible programs to use more RAM. An alternative OS, the UCSD p-System is also included.

Application and utility bundled software
Program Name	Version	Published by	Program Type	Date	Part Number	Number of Disks	Picture
CP/M Plus	3.0	Digital Research	System Disk / Utilities	1982		3	
MBASIC/CBASIC	5.21/2.38	Microsoft/Compiler Systems Inc.	BASIC interpreter/compiler	1981		1	
Desolation		B.C Software; Barry Campbell	Game	1984		1	
WordStar/MailMerge	3.3	MicroPro International Corp.	Application			2	
SuperCalc	1.12	Sorcim	Application	1983		1	
Personal Pearl	1.02	Relational Systems	Application/Database	1982	9G01601-00	6	

=== Compatibility ===
The CP/M BIOS of the Executive can automatically detect and use single-sided disks formatted on the following systems:

- Osborne 1
- IBM PC running CP/M-86
- DEC VT180
- Xerox 820
- Commodore 128

Many CP/M systems of the time could not read diskettes formatted for any other brand (sometimes even for other models of the same brand) without using third-party special-purpose interchange software. This built-in feature provides a useful amount of flexibility in exchanging data with other systems.

The Executive can also emulate certain models of computer terminal, which is useful for dial-up access to remote systems:

- VT100
- ADM-3A
- Hazeltine
- Hewlett-Packard

== Reception ==
Approving of the Executive's screen, Jerry Pournelle of BYTE wrote in May 1983 that most users would not need an external display. After using prototypes of it and the Executive II, he predicted that they "are going to be major contenders in the microcomputer market, and not just among the portables, either".

== Use ==
The Osborne Executive was especially useful for presentations and projects at client sites. Unlike static presentations, the Executive could provide on-the-spot answers to numeric questions when working with consulting clients. This laid the groundwork for the kind of 'show me the money' ROI or TCO presentations that are commonplace today.

Some Executives were produced with personalized ROMs when booted and etched name plates on the casing.

The Executive was only produced in limited numbers due to the Chapter 11 bankruptcy of the Osborne Computer Corporation. The financial problems of the company were further aggravated by premature announcement of the Executive, which cut into the sales of the Osborne 1. This misstep became the namesake for the Osborne effect.

In November 1984 a successor to the Executive, the Osborne Vixen, was announced. Osborne Computer Corporation, however, went out of business before the Vixen could establish itself in the marketplace. An Osborne Executive II, using an 8088 processor and providing MS-DOS and IBM PC compatibility, was announced but never produced.

== Hardware ==
=== Features ===
- Two half-height 5¼-inch, single-sided, double-density 40-track floppy disk drives with 160 KB capacity (Shugart Associates standard, unlike the Osborne 1)
- 4 MHz Z80A CPU
- 124 KB main memory
- 4 KB character font RAM
  - Two sets of 128 characters
  - 8×10 pixel characters
- 8 KB ROM
- Fold-down keyboard doubling as the computer case's lid
- 7-inch, 80 character × 24 line amber monochrome CRT display
- IEEE-488 port configurable as a parallel printer port
- Two RS-232 serial ports supporting up to 9600 baud for use with external modems or serial printers
- External composite video monitor connection
- Storage pocket for up to eight 5¼-inch disks

The Osborne Executive is powered by a wall plug, and has no internal battery. An aftermarket battery pack offering 1-hour run time was available.

=== Size ===
- Width: 20.5 inches (52 cm)
- Height: 9 inches (23 cm)
- Depth: 13 inches (33 cm)
- Weight: 28 pounds (13 kg)

=== Upgrades and enhancements ===
The Executive's motherboard was wired to support double-sided drives by providing the SIDE signal from the disk controller socket to the drive connector. This capability is unused by the included single-sided Western Digital FD1793 floppy-disk controller.

An upgrade kit from Future Systems to install 360 KB double-sided double-density drives was briefly available. It consisted of two DSDD drives, a drop-in replacement FD1797 disk controller, ROM (1.3) upgrade, and an upgraded CP/M BIOS (1.4) with utilities that provide backward compatibility for SSSD/SSDD disks as well as a newer format used by the Osborne Vixen.

An 11 MB hard disk drive option was available from Gard Micro Systems; installation requires the removal of one floppy drive to accommodate the new drive, a new logic board, and fitting a more powerful mains voltage fan.

The motherboard also provides a pin header (P12) giving connections to the CPU, RAM and video memory and direct memory access for possible future internal expansion via a daughterboard.
