= Shell corporation =

Company with few, if any, actual assets or operations

A shell corporation (also known as a shell company or paper company) is a company or corporation with no significant assets or operations, often formed to obtain financing before beginning business. Shell companies were primarily vehicles for lawfully hiding the identity of their beneficial owners, and this is still their defining feature due to the loopholes in global corporate transparency initiatives. A shell corporation may hold passive investments or be the registered owner of assets, such as intellectual property or ships. Shell companies may be registered to the address of a company that provides incorporation services, and which may act as the statutory agent (also known as registered agent or resident agent) for receipt of legal correspondence. The shell company may serve as a vehicle for business transactions without itself having any significant assets or operations.

Shell companies are used for lawful purposes such as holding assets or tax avoidance. However, they can also be used for illegal purposes such as tax evasion, hiding stolen assets, or money laundering. Anonymity, in the context of shell companies, relates to anonymity of beneficial owners of the company. Anonymity may be sought to shield personal assets from others, such as a spouse in the event of divorce, from creditors, or from government authorities.

One example of a legitimate business purpose for shell companies is acting as trustee for a trust, and not engaging in any other activity on their own account. This structure creates limited liability for the trustee. A shell company can also be formed around a partnership to create limited liability for the partners, and other business ventures, or to immunize one part of a business from the risks of another part. Shell companies can be used to transfer assets from one company into a new one while leaving the liabilities in the former company. Shell companies are also used for privacy and security reasons by wealthy individuals and celebrities. Shell companies may be used to generate both pecuniary and non-pecuniary private benefits by their beneficial owners.

== SEC definition ==
The U.S. Securities and Exchange Commission defines shell company as follows:

Shell company: The term shell company means a registrant, other than an asset-backed issuer as defined in Item 1101(b) of Regulation AB (§ 229.1101(b) of this chapter), that has:

(1) No or nominal operations; and

(2) Either:

(i) No or nominal assets;

(ii) Assets consisting solely of cash and cash equivalents; or

(iii) Assets consisting of any amount of cash and cash equivalents and nominal other assets.

== Background ==
Some shell companies may have previously had operations that shrank due to unfavorable market conditions or company mismanagement. A shell corporation may also arise when a company's operations have been wound up, for example following a takeover, but the shell of the original company continues to exist. The term shell corporation does not describe the purpose of a corporate entity; in general it is more informative to classify an entity according to its role in a particular corporate structure; e.g. holding company, general partner, or limited partner.

Shell companies are a main component of the underground economy, especially those based in tax havens. They may also be known as international business companies, personal investment companies, front companies, or mailbox companies. While these terms are generally used interchangeably in practice, their meanings are not the same and each term is generated to refer to a different theme of illegality. Shell companies can also be used for tax avoidance. A classic tax avoidance operation may utilize favorable transfer pricing among multiple corporate entities to lower tax liability in a certain country; e.g. Double Irish arrangement.

A special purpose entity, used often in the context of a larger corporate structure, may be formed to achieve a specific goal, such as to create anonymity.

According to a 2013 experimental study, where the researchers requested anonymous incorporation in violation of international law, one in four corporate service providers offered to provide services in violation of international law.

== Examples ==
Shell companies can be used to transfer assets of one company into a new company without having the liabilities of the former company. For example, when Sega Sammy Holdings purchased the bankrupt Index Corporation in June 2013, they formed a shell company in September 2013, called Sega Dream Corporation, into which were transferred valuable assets of the old company, including the Atlus brand and Index Corporation's intellectual property. This meant that the liabilities of the old company were left in the old company, and Sega Dream had clean title to all the assets of the old company. The former Index Corporation was then dissolved. Sega Dream Corporation was renamed as Index Corporation in November 2013.

When Hilco purchased HMV Canada, they used a shell company by the name of Huk 10 Ltd. in order to secure funds and minimize liability. In January 2017, HUK 10 Ltd., which had lent money to the chain, applied to an Ontario court to place HMV Canada into receivership. This allowed Hilco to regain assets and dispose of HMV Canada.

In addition, there are several shell companies that are used by broadcasting groups to circumvent FCC limits on television station ownership. For example, Sinclair Broadcasting Group forms local marketing agreements with stations owned by Cunningham Broadcasting and Deerfield Media; nearly all of the stock of Cunningham Broadcasting is controlled by trusts in the name of the owner's children.

== Countries of domicile ==
Typical countries of domicile of shell companies are offshore financial centres like Ireland, Liechtenstein, Luxembourg, Switzerland, Isle of Man, and the Channel Islands including Guernsey and Jersey in Europe, Bahamas, Barbados, Bermuda, Cayman Islands, and Virgin Islands in the Caribbean, Panama in Central America, and Hong Kong and Singapore in Asia. Shell companies are usually offered by law firms based in those countries. The process of establishing a shell company can sometimes be done very quickly online.

Due to federalism in the United States, shell companies are often set up in states such as Delaware, Nevada, and Wyoming due to advantageous tax regimes. Companies offer nominee incorporation services (NIS) which are often used in the formation of shell companies. These companies often provide a variety of services, including resident agent, mail-forwarding, and physical local addresses so that the companies appear more legitimate. Banks may also serve as formation agents in the U.S..

== Abuse ==
Shell companies have been used to commit fraud by creating an empty shell company with a name similar to an existing real company, then inflating the price of its stock and quickly selling it (a pump and dump scheme).

There are also shell companies that were created for the purpose of owning assets (including tangibles, such as real estate for property development, and intangibles, such as royalties or copyrights) and receiving income. The reasons behind creating such a shell company may include protection against litigation and/or tax benefits (some expenses that would not be deductible for an individual may be deductible for a corporation). Sometimes, shell companies are used for tax evasion or tax avoidance.

=== Offshore Leaks ===
In 2013, the International Consortium of Investigative Journalists published a report called "Offshore Leaks" with information about the use and owners of 130,000 shell companies. Many of the shell companies belonged to politicians and celebrities from around the world and were being used for tax evasion and hiding financial assets.

=== Panama Papers ===
In 2016, a leak of 11.5 million documents to the German newspaper Süddeutsche Zeitung revealed information about owners of more than 214,000 shell companies administered by the law firm Mossack Fonseca in Panama. The shell companies were used by politicians, businessmen, autocrats, and terrorists from around the world for tax evasion and other illegal activities.

=== India ===
After India's decision to demonetise ₹500 and ₹1000 rupee notes on 8 November 2016, various authorities noticed a surge in shell companies depositing cash in banks, possibly in an attempt to hide the real owner of the wealth. In response, in July 2017, the authorities ordered nearly 2,000 shell companies to be shut down while Securities and Exchange Board of India (SEBI) imposed trading restrictions on 162 listed entities as shell companies. A high-level task force found that hundreds of shell companies were registered in a few buildings in Kolkata. Many of those were found to be locked, with their padlocks coated in dust and many others which had office space the size of cubicles.

== Regulation ==
Since shell companies are very often abused for various illegal purposes, regulation of shell companies is becoming more important to prevent such illegal activities.

=== United Kingdom ===
Currently British overseas territories and crown dependencies are only required to tell the true name of owners of shell companies upon request from official law enforcement agencies. However, since 2020 they are forced to publish these names in a public register in order to prevent anonymous use of shell companies.

=== United States ===
The customer due diligence (CDD) rule from 2016 requires that banks know the identities of beneficial owners of legal entity customers, enabling them to disclose this information to law enforcement agencies, thus aiding in the identification of the true business owners and their tax liabilities. Thereby, the rule aims to prevent the anonymous misuse of shell companies. The rule is administered by the Financial Crimes Enforcement Network (FinCEN). The Corporate Transparency Act, enacted in January 2021 as part of the William M. (Mac) Thornberry National Defense Authorization Act for Fiscal Year 2021, required many companies to report their beneficial owners to FinCEN; the reporting rule took effect on 1 January 2024. In 2025, however, the US Treasury department announced it would not enforce this law, and thus shell companies would not be required to follow the law requiring they disclose their owners and beneficiaries. On March 21, 2025, FinCEN announced an interim final rule removing the reporting requirement for domestic businesses. In August 2026 FinCEN issued a final rule that made this exemption permanent; the rule took effect on 14 August 2026.

=== India ===
A "Task Force on Shell Companies" was constituted in 2017 under the chairmanship of the Revenue Secretary to the Government of India and Corporate Affairs Secretary to Govt. of India, for effectively tackling malpractice by shell companies in a comprehensive manner.

=== European Union ===
Within the European Union outlined here, the problem has arisen of the lack of a common definition at Community level of shell companies, often also defined by the specific legislation of Member States as non-operating companies.

To compensate for this absence and with the aim of preventing, identifying, and combating the misuse of shell companies for tax purposes, on 22 December 2021, the European Commission adopted a proposal for an EU directive (n. 565/2021). Also known as “Unshell” or "ATAD 3 - Anti-Tax Avoidance Directive,“ the proposal would aim to support Member States in identifying shell companies located in the EU that are used exclusively for tax purposes, through an ”access test" that assesses the percentage of passive income, the degree of cross-border operations of the entity, and the possible outsourcing of management functions.

This proposal for a directive from the Commission No. 565 of 2021 would have amended a previous European Union directive, namely directive 2011/16/EU on administrative cooperation in the field of taxation.

As can be inferred from the text of the proposal itself, the European Union would be competent to enact legislation in this area by invoking Article 115 of the Treaty on the Functioning of the European Union.

According to the European Union's special legislative procedure, the proposed directive would have required a unanimous vote in the Council of the EU, after consultation with the European Parliament and the European Economic and Social Committee.

However, despite the legal basis having been correctly identified, the Council of the EU formally announced its decision to abandon the draft directive in question in ECOFIN Report 9960/2025, published on June 18, 2025.

As can be inferred from ECOFIN Report 9960/2025 itself, on May 27, 2025, the Working Party on Trade Questions (WPTQ) noted that there is an overlap between the tax risk indicators provided for in the Unshell proposal and those contained in the DAC6 directive, which trigger a reporting obligation to the tax authorities as a result of a presumption of aggressive tax planning. The WPTQ itself justified its decision not to issue the Unshell directive by noting that it could have led to duplication of communications and an increase in administrative burdens that would have been incompatible with the objectives of simplification and reduction of the regulatory burden sought by the European Union institutions.

One of the reasons for deciding to abandon the preparatory work on the directive was therefore the fact that directive 2018/822 had already been issued within the European Union, providing for the mandatory automatic exchange of information on cross-border arrangements subject to notification (DAC6). The acronym DAC stands for Directive on Administrative Cooperation; it was issued with the aim of ensuring greater fiscal transparency through mandatory reporting, by intermediaries or taxpayers themselves in cases where there is no obligated intermediary, of certain cross-border transactions within a predetermined time frame. The exchange of information is made possible by the creation of a central register accessible to EU Member States.

The European Union has been pursuing regulatory measures to address the use of “shell entities” for tax purposes. The proposed Unshell Directive (ATAD III) aims to introduce a unified substance test for EU companies, establishing minimum criteria for economic presence and activity. Three major Member States — France, Germany, and Spain — illustrate distinct regulatory approaches and challenges in implementing such measures.

=== France ===
French companies may be affected by the “gateway test” of the Unshell Directive, which assesses whether more than 75 % of income is passive, whether management is outsourced, and whether premises or staff are lacking. Entities failing the substance test risk losing benefits under bilateral tax treaties and EU directives (Parent-Subsidiary Directive, Interest & Royalties Directive), unless they provide evidence of real business activity. Annual reporting obligations require disclosure of employees, premises, bank accounts, and governance details.

=== Germany ===
German-resident companies are subject to the same substance test, evaluating staff, premises, and decision-making functions. Entities presumed to be shells may be denied standard tax residence certificates or receive one marked as “shell,” affecting treaty and EU directive benefits. Domestic rules on treaty-shopping may still apply in parallel, so passing the Unshell test alone may not fully shield a company from scrutiny.

=== Spain ===
Spanish entities are also subject to the gateway test and must report detailed information, including staff, premises, bank accounts, and decision-making structures. Presumed shell entities risk loss of treaty benefits, limited residency certification, or flow-through treatment unless they rebut the presumption. Commentators warn that the administrative burden may disproportionately affect small companies and cross-border start-ups.

=== Italy ===
In Italy, the concept most closely corresponding to Anglo-Saxon "shell companies" is the category of "società di comodo" (non-operating companies), a statutory anti-avoidance tool used to identify entities lacking genuine economic activity. Italian tax law applies presumptions of non-operativity, which companies may rebut by providing evidence of substantive operations, such as actual business premises, employees, and commercial activity.

Italian jurisprudence has repeatedly stressed that the formal existence of a company is not sufficient when its economic reality is inconsistent with its declared activity. The Italian Court of Cassation has held that the creation or use of shell-type entities to issue invoices for non-existent transactions constitutes a criminal offence under Legislative Decree 74/2000. Recent decisions also address the interaction between the Italian società di comodo regime and EU VAT law. An Italian court has ruled that entities deemed non-operating do not automatically lose their right to deduct VAT, finding that a blanket denial would be inconsistent with Directive 2006/112/EC and that taxpayers must be allowed to demonstrate the substance of their transactions. Italian parliamentary and academic sources have also linked domestic "società di comodo" rules to the broader EU debate on the proposed Unshell Directive, noting potential overlaps and inconsistencies between national presumptions of non-operativity and the EU-level substance test.

== See also ==
- Alternative public offering
- Brass plate company
- Dummy corporation
- Front organization
- Holding company
- Internal competition
- Money laundering
- Numbered company
- Offshore company
- Offshore financial center
- Shadow banking system
- Structured investment vehicle
- Tax inversion
- Transparency (market)
