= Sorcim =

Computer software company

Sorcim Corporation
- Type: Private
- Industry: Software
- Founded: June 1980
- Founders: Richard Frank; Paul McQuesten; Martin Herbach; Anil Lakhwara; Steve Jasik
- Defunct: 1984
- Fate: acquired by Computer Associates in 1985

Sorcim Corporation was an early start-up company in Silicon Valley, founded in June 1980 by Richard Frank, Paul McQuesten, Martin Herbach, Anil Lakhwara, and Steve Jasik - all former Control Data Corporation employees working in the Language Group in Sunnyvale, CA. Jasik left company early on, to develop the MacNosy product for the Macintosh.

Sorcim was best known for SuperCalc, a spreadsheet the company developed for the Osborne Computer Corporation portable computer. The company made many other products, including SuperWriter and SuperProject before its acquisition by Computer Associates in 1985. Although the company continued as a largely autonomous division of CA, it never again achieved prominence after the acquisition.

The company was named "Sorcim" after Richard Frank saw a reflection of the word “micros” in an airplane window.

== Early history ==
The company was founded to expand the microcomputer products from Digicom, a company formed by Richard in 1978. Paul joined in 1979. The Digicom software programs ran on the CP/M operating system using the Intel 8080, 8085 and later the 8086, Zilog Z80 and the Z8000. The company's early products included Pascal/M, and ACT - a set of cross assemblers including one for the Atari (8080) and the Commodore PET (6502).

In these early days of the company, and before the introduction of the IBM PC and MS-DOS, Sorcim used Godbout S100 bus CP/M machines for development; these machines were fast and the people at Godbout were competent hardware developers. Bill Godbout was one of the first commercial accounts for Sorcim, supporting the company's cross assemblers and Pascal/M. In fact at one time Godbout helped relieve a short-term cash flow problem by doing a one-time buy of development tool products. "Bill was one of those people who always provided you an honest opinion (sometimes to the dismay of Sorcim managers) and great Friday lunch meetings."

== The birth of SuperCalc ==
In 1980 at one of the local monthly computer industry poker parties, Bill Godbout introduced Richard Frank to Adam Osborne. Lee Felsenstein was developing the industry's first portable computer for Adam Osborne's new company, and he needed a CP/M BIOS. This computer was released as the Osborne 1.

In late Fall of 1980, Adam was looking for a spreadsheet for the Osborne 1. His efforts to acquire rights to VisiCalc were disappointing, so he asked Sorcim if they would be interested in developing a spreadsheet that would be competitive with VisiCalc, and develop it in time to showcase it at the West Coast Computer Faire in April 1981. The company accepted the challenge, working days on contract programming (a CHILL compiler for Siemens) and nights on the Osborne BIOS and SuperCalc. With Martin Herbach as the lead architect, the company hired Gary Balleisen, as the lead developer, to implement a demo version of the application.

The product was introduced in April 1981 at the West Coast Computer Faire in the Osborne booth. The enthusiastic reception surprised the Sorcim folks. SuperCalc was written in assembly code using Sorcim's ACT assembler. Eventually SuperCalc was ported to over 150 different hardware platforms - from the Osborne 1 to the Zenith Z89. By the 18-month mark, the company had sold over 250,000 copies of the original SuperCalc. During this period, the company estimated that VisiCalc's market share was about 85% and SuperCalc was about 15%. There were some other early spreadsheet programs, but these two programs shared essentially the entire market.

== Executive restructuring ==
Toward the end of 1982, the founders had become dissatisfied with company management. They removed the company president and each founder took on an acting VP role: Herbach ran Sales, Lakahara was responsible for software development, McQuesten supervised Finance, and Frank was CEO and Chairman. Despite this, the founders were unhappy in these roles and they were actively looking for a new president to guide the company's growth. SuperCalc2, SuperWriter, and SuperChart, which were all announced in November 1982, had no concrete ship dates, and a census of projects in the company showed that the development staff of about 20 people was working on over 100 projects. This was whittled down to the main applications and development tools.

At this time, the company made its first serious effort to establish control over the products, and Greg Resnick (who came aboard with the SpellGuard acquisition) became Product Manager of SuperWriter, while new hire Walter Feigenson came in to manage SuperCalc.

The founders were still actively looking for a new leader during the early part of 1983. They had interviewed a number of candidates for CEO, but none were considered acceptable. They coalesced around Jim Pelkey, who had started consulting for the founders in late 1982. Pelkey was introduced to the company by Jack Melchor of Melchor Venture Management to help management create a strategic plan. Melchor was an early investor in ROLM, Software Publishing, 3Com, The Learning Company. He was the only outside investor in Sorcim, and a member of the board.

Pelkey was appointed President in May 1983, followed by George Wikle as CFO. Bill Ferguson, was hired from MicroPro (the makers of WordStar) as VP of Sales, and Steve Goldsworthy joined from HP as VP of engineering. Ron Grubman was recruited as VP of corporate development in the summer of 1983, and the team was rounded out by Hal King, who was hired as VP of marketing.

== The company makes plans to move beyond CP/M ==
SuperCalc2 shipped April 15, 1983 for CP/M machines, and a month later for CP/M-86 machines. Sales continued at a healthy upward pace, despite strong competition from Lotus 1-2-3. VisiCalc sales essentially dried up, and Sorcim management believed that SuperCalc maintained its 15% market share in a rapidly growing market.

With the new management team coming together, the team focused on aggressively growing the company to maintain market visibility and power, respond to the phenomenon of Lotus 1-2-3, create a "killer app" for the IBM PC, solve the constraints of a thin capitalization and remain profitable.

The marketing challenge was to create a solid relationship with IBM while generating as much revenue as possible from existing products. Simultaneously, the staff was tasked with evolving beyond a CP/M company. Work began on a new "killer" product that was to become SuperCalc3.

Although well known because SuperCalc was one of the three products packaged with the Osborne I CP/M "luggable" computer. Sorcim had no new product offerings for the IBM PC. SuperCalc for MS-DOS was functionally the same product as the CP/M version, which was typical for all established products at this time. Lotus 1-2-3 was a notable exception. Sorcim failed to change focus from CP/M, where the company had almost 100% market share, to DOS, where SuperCalc simply maintained its market share.

== New management establishes future directions ==
The engineering organization was divided into three major efforts:

1. Maintain the current products including ports to new OEM computers,
2. Create SuperCalc3, and
3. Invest in a skunkworks effort that would lead to products beyond SuperCalc3.

The capital structure constraints required the company to become profitable, again attain market growth and to create an exciting business plan for the future; all aimed at raising a new capital round in the early part of 1984.

It seemed important to demonstrate that the new team was in control, since so many startups falter when the founders don't hand over full control to their new management teams. So while the new team came together, Richard Frank and Paul McQuesten moved a few blocks away to an office called "The Farm." Nobody knew the location or their phone number. There were two purposes: 1) to give the new team some breathing room, and 2) to start work on a new version of a multifunction product that was code-named Oyster. Richard, Paul, and Jeff McKenna bought a Symbolics LISP machine so they could start rapid prototyping of new products. This work had previously been done on paper and at white boards.

In fact, there was another project going on to define this product—a kind of skunkworks team composed of Martin Herbach, Dave Montagna (also of CDC Fortran compiler fame), and Walter Feigenson. This team got pretty far into defining what would have been a windowing system based on technology they had acquired from Payment Pouladdej and Peter Fiore—a system that appeared very similar to GEM, which was being developed by Digital Research (much to the chagrin of Payment and Peter who had shown it to Digital Research before joining Sorcim). This project died when Computer Associates acquired Sorcim.

By the time SuperCalc2 shipped in April 1983, Sorcim knew that its competitor was no longer VisiCalc, but Lotus 1-2-3, which became an instant best seller in February 1983. Besides being technically excellent, 1-2-3 also had a substantially larger marketing budget than Sorcim's. As a marketing reply to this juggernaut, Sorcim crafted plans to add the features of SuperChart to the DOS version of SuperCalc, and this became SuperCalc3, which shipped in September 1983. SC3 was introduced at the CP/M show in Boston in 1983. Although some thought this venue an odd choice, Sorcim still thought at that time that it could make a "universal" version of SuperCalc3 for any CP/M machine. This turned out to be impractical because CP/M-86 did not function to hide the hardware level from the application software.

At the Boston show, many industry people paid attention to Sorcim's booth, including Mitch Kapor, the founder of Lotus Development, the 1-2-3 company. SuperCalc was effectively the only competition to 1-2-3 at that point, and SC3 was vastly superior to 1-2-3 in its graphics. When Product Manager Walter Feigenson showed Kapor the product for the first time, Mitch was astounded that SC3 could do everything it did from a single disk. He even remarked that he had to reprogram 1-2-3 in Assembler to get its speed - and he wanted to know how Martin Herbach had managed to get the C-coded graphics engine to work in the middle of a non-relocatable Assembler program.(That remains a bit of unknown magic to this day.) By all accounts, Martin had achieved the impossible. SuperCalc's graphics were on a par with dedicated graphics programs (it won 3rd place in the National Software Testing Labs graphics programs competition in 1984). But good graphics weren't enough to supplant 1-2-3, and in fact the company learned that 1-2-3 users weren't even printing their graphics, since the cable for the only low-cost pen plotter was wired incorrectly.

It's interesting to note that Microsoft also had a spreadsheet (MultiPlan) at this time, but the main competitors for the King of Spreadsheets remained SuperCalc3 and later versions, and 1-2-3 in its upgraded versions. Microsoft eventually abandoned MultiPlan in favor of Excel.

== SuperCalc3 porting sales ==
Sorcim was very successful at selling an OEM CP/M version of SuperCalc2, and sales for 1983 zoomed to $7M including the upfront OEM payments. These were not "porting contracts," since CP/M machines all executed the same code and used one of the 100+ standard terminals Sorcim products supported. The only difference in versions was the disk size and recording format. After SC3 shipped, the company began a successful campaign to port this graphical version to IBM "compatibles" (which mostly weren't 100% compatible at that time). At the same time, the company created a corporate sales organization. By early 1984, DOS sales dominated, and CP/M sales had eroded, and our efforts to get IBM to minimally endorse us - as they had endorsed Microsoft and Lotus – failed. Sales to businesses were not advancing fast enough to fund our efforts.

Management concluded that the company needed additional financial resources. Retail sales remained relatively steady, and the company sold some ports to other platforms that generated significant OEM revenue (some ports ran as high as $500,000). But at retail, the company was never able to make a significant dent in the 1-2-3 juggernaut.

Sorcim did find a "sweet spot" in the US Government and some large companies that refused to buy software with copy protection, which was included in every copy of 1-2-3. Eventually, Lotus lost big chunks of their government business to Sorcim, and Sorcim started selling unlimited site licenses for SuperCalc and SuperWriter to firms like Ernst & Young (one of the "Big 8" accounting firms).

== Additional financing ==
Throughout this time, the company continued to increase headcount to get to the "critical mass" required to be a major player in the industry. Newly acquired products, as well as home-built efforts, failed to achieve much sales success. These included SuperProject, a project management program using "drop down menus," which was licensed from its creator Alan Cooper; and Paul McQuesten's SuperCalc3 for the Apple IIc (in native 6502 code.

Revenues from compilers and products like the company's Pascal/M interpreter were drying up fast. SuperWriter, when it shipped, never sold in substantial quantities, and was limited by its ability to edit only what it could hold in memory. The company probably diluted its efforts in agreeing to ports of SuperCalc3 to Unix machines (AT&T machines - the UNIX PC, and the 3B2, which Sorcim employees referred to as the world's most expensive paperweight). Non-standard defocused efforts in the predominant market, especially on contracts they had for computers for which the company could not complete an effective port. In those days, the "gold standard" for compatibility was Compaq; everything else had differences, sometimes trivial (AT&T had additional graphics capabilities), or massive - but every company wanted to claim IBM compatibility, and that could only be proven through software. By this time, Osborne, which never established a foothold in the DOS market, was no longer a factor in portable computers. But there were others in the works, and Sorcim worked with many of these startups.

The burden of revenue for the company was always SuperCalc, no matter how the company tried to branch out. Starting with SuperCalc2, the product life cycle was tightened to 9 months. The objective was to catch up to and pass 1-2-3. By the time SuperCalc4 shipped, in 1985, the software was so refined that it was runner-up for the product of the year at PC Magazine's annual Comdex bash. PC Magazine, in its “Best of 1986” review had this to say: “If market dominance were based on rational criteria, Computer Associates' SuperCalc 4 would certainly replace 1-2-3 as the leading spreadsheet program. After all, it can do anything that 1-2-3 can do and adds some notable features of its own."

By early 1984 InfoWorld estimated that Sorcim was the world's 13th-largest microcomputer-software company, with $12 million in 1983 sales. In the fall of 1983 (first closing January 1984), Sorcim raised over $9 million in private financing through Alex. Brown & Sons, but soon after concluded that Microsoft and Lotus had such dominant market shares that even more resources were required to be competitive. The company also funded a million dollar print advertising campaign in the Wall Street Journal and other national papers that failed to increase sales. In the early part of 1984, it became clear that the revenue bubble that Sorcim and substantially all of the other companies in the PC marketplace had experienced was bursting. Consequently, management re-hired Alex. Brown and Sons to find a corporate partner. In the spring of 1984, Computer Associates purchased Sorcim.

== See also ==
- Sorcim TRANS86
