= VP-Expert =

AI software

- Cover of VP-Expert software
- Original author: Brian Sawyer
- Developer: Paperback Software
- Initial release: 1987
- Stable release: / 1993
- Operating system: MS-DOS
- Type: Expert System Development Tool
- License: Proprietary

VP-Expert is an artificial intelligence development tool that gained popularity in the late 1980s and early 1990s. Published by Paperback Software, VP-Expert was designed to facilitate the creation of rule-based expert systems, primarily for applications in business and industry. It was the best-selling expert-system software for microcomputers in the late 1980s.

== History ==
VP-Expert was created by Brian Sawyer and published by Paperback Software in 1987. VP-Expert was widely adopted during the late 1980s. By April 1989, InfoWorld described it as "the best-selling expert-system software for personal computers."

In June 1991, ownership of VP-Expert transferred from Paperback Software to WordTech Systems, Inc. following Paperback Software’s liquidation after a legal dispute with Lotus Development Corporation regarding its VP-Planner spreadsheet. VP-Expert continued to receive positive reviews with InfoWorld stating in 1992 "for automatically creating simple expert systems and being able to edit them into more sophisticated applications, hardly a better product exists than VP-Expert".

== Features ==
VP-Expert used an inference engine based on backward chaining to reach conclusions through English-like if/then rules. It operated through a text interface and included an explanation facility that showed the reasoning steps used to justify its conclusions.

== Applications ==
VP-Expert found applications across various domains. In environmental analysis, researchers used VP-Expert to develop a knowledge-based system for analyzing the impact of particulate matter air pollution on human health. In engineering design, VP-Expert was utilized in the creation of a prototype expert system to assist in fishway design. In aviation management, the tool was employed to develop an expert system aimed at maximizing airport capacity while adhering to noise-mitigation plans.

== Limitations ==
While VP-Expert offered certain advantages, it also had limitations. Its rule-based approach could become challenging to manage for large and complex knowledge bases, and the process of eliciting and encoding knowledge from experts could be time-consuming and difficult.
