= Osborne Computer Corporation =

American portable computer maker

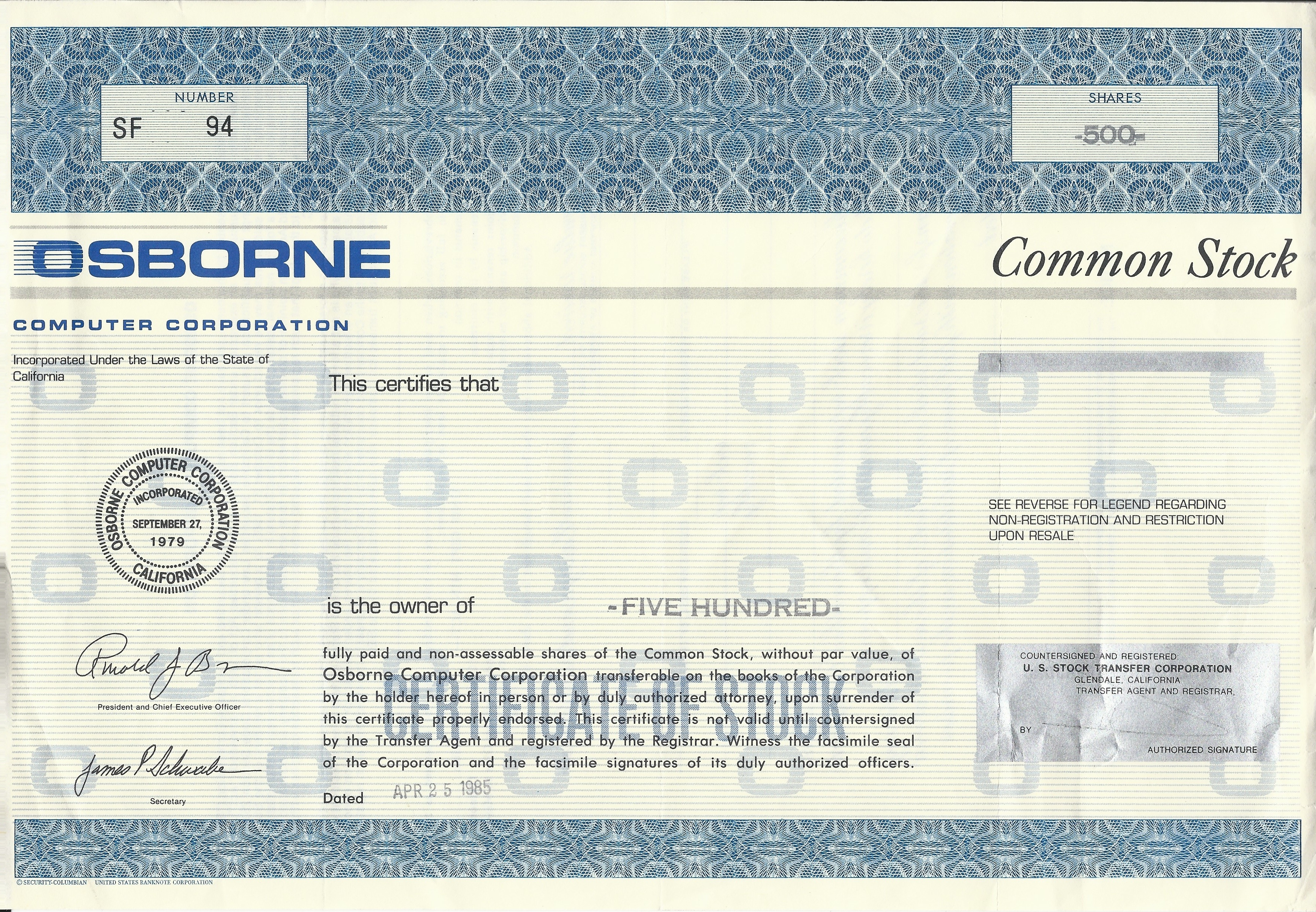
- Osborne Computer Corporation Stock Certificate
- Industry: Computer hardware
- Founded: 1980; 46 years ago
- Defunct: 1985
- Fate: Bankrupt
- Successor: Mikrolog Ltd
- Headquarters: Hayward, California
- Key people: Adam Osborne; Lee Felsenstein
- Products: Osborne 1; Osborne Executive; Osborne Vixen; Osborne PC (never released)

The Osborne Computer Corporation (OCC) was an American computer company and pioneering maker of portable computers. It was located in Hayward, California, in the San Francisco Bay Area. In 1981, Adam Osborne and Lee Felsenstein developed the world's first mass-produced portable computer, the Osborne 1.

== History ==
=== Osborne 1 ===
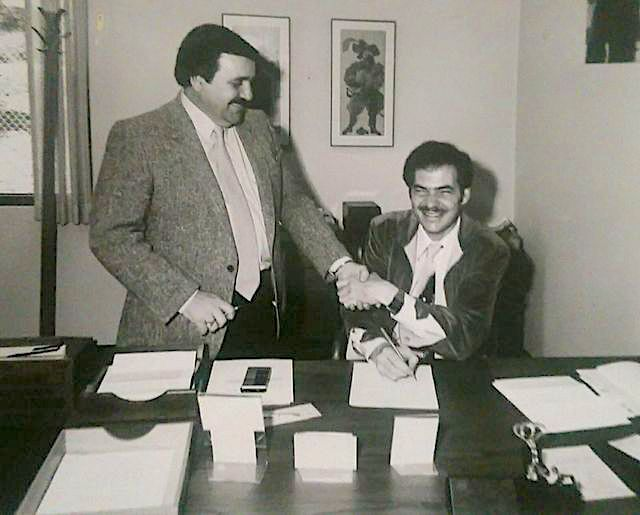
Tom Cooper signs with Adam Osborne.

After Adam Osborne sold his computer book-publishing company to McGraw-Hill in 1979, he decided to market an inexpensive portable computer with bundled software and hired Lee Felsenstein to design it. The resulting Osborne 1 featured a 5-inch (130 mm) 52-column cathode-ray tube display, two floppy-disk drives, a Z80 microprocessor, and 64 KB of RAM. It could fit under an airplane seat and survive being accidentally dropped. The bundled software package included the CP/M operating system, the MBASIC and CBASIC programming languages, the WordStar word processing package, and the SuperCalc spreadsheet program. It also included project management software with PERT and Gantt charts, and communications software for a 300 baud modem. Osborne obtained the software in part by offering stock in the new Osborne Computer Corporation, which he founded in January 1981. For example, MicroPro International received 75,000 shares and $4.60 for each copy of WordStar Osborne distributed with his computers.

Unlike other startup companies, Osborne Computer Corporation's first product was ready soon after its founding. The first Osborne 1 shipped in July 1981, and its low price set market expectations for bundled hardware and software packages for several years to come. The company sold 11,000 Osborne 1s in the eight months after its July 1981 debut, with 50,000 more on backorder, although the early units had a 10–15% failure rate. The peak sales per month for it over the course of its lifetime was 10,000 units, despite the initial business plan for the computer predicting a total of only 10,000 units sold over the entire product lifecycle. Osborne had difficulty meeting demand, and the company grew from two employees, Osborne and Felsenstein, to 3,000 people and $73 million in revenue in 12 months. The growth was so rapid that, in one case, an executive who returned from a one-week trade show had to search two buildings to find her relocated staff. The company announced in October 1982 a temporary bundling of Ashton-Tate's dBase II, increasing demand so much that production reached 500 units a day and severely diminishing quality control.

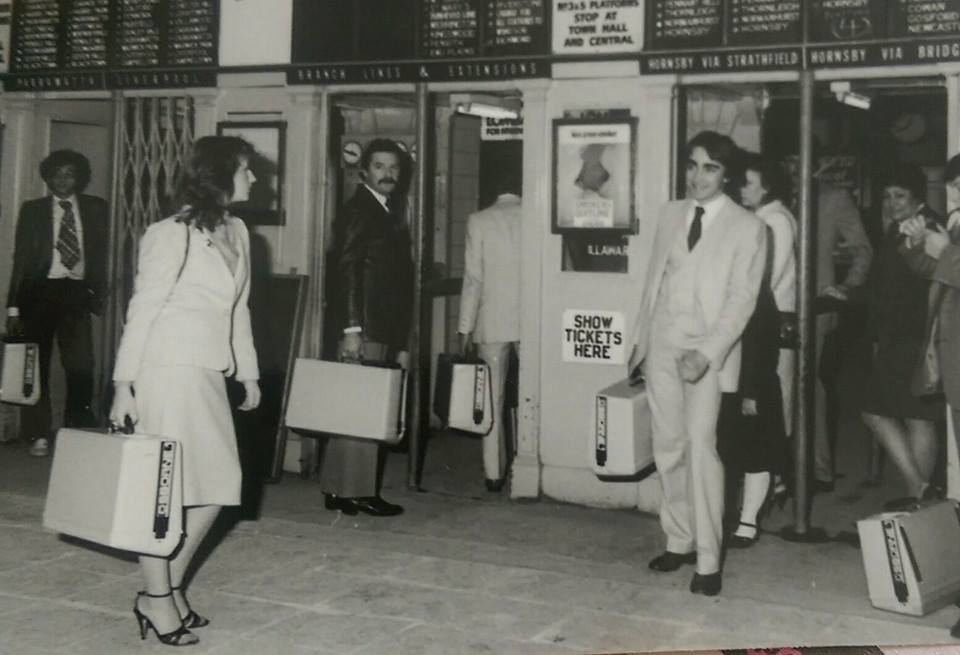
Future vision of portable computers seen in Australia

In 1982, Osborne was originally represented in Australia exclusively by President Computers Pty Ltd headed by Tom Cooper, a captain of industry in the emerging Australian PC era. With outstanding success of Osborne 1 sales in Australia, President Computers was lauded at the time by Osborne Corp USA as the largest global distributor of Osborne 1 luggable computers outside of Computerland USA. However with success, Osborne's visiting CFO had his own sights on the Australian market place and convinced Adam Osborne to split the Agency, much to Cooper's objection. This move saw President Computers equally divide its current Dealership arrangement when Osborne Corporation setup to hold half the dealership Agency. Upon this decision President Computers exclusivity signed on Osborne's luggable rival, the US Del Mar CA manufactured Kaypro Computer produced by Non-Linear Systems, which boasted a larger format built-in screen.

Cooper held a trusted business relationship with Adam Osborne and was privy to an early viewing of the yet to be released new Osborne Executive. On sighting warehouses full of the first model, Cooper cautioned Osborne that the Osborne II should only be announced once the original Osborne 1 stock had been depleted. Ultimately, dismissing such advice contributed to Osborne Corporation's demise and Chapter 11 filing in September 1983. Osborne Corporation in Australia was then restructured and moved towards the PC sector but retained use of the Osborne brand. By this time, President Computers also had strong success with the Kaypro luggable computer sales, and had itself moved into the PC Sector under its own private label brand with Cooper's President Computer PC Assembly plant officially being opened on the Gold Coast Technology Park, 1 Computer Street, Labrador Queensland in 1986 by the Minister for Industry, Small Business and Technology of Queensland Hon. Mike Ahern.

=== Competition ===
Despite early success, Osborne struggled under heavy competition. Kaypro Computer offered portables that, like the Osborne 1, ran CP/M and included a software bundle, but Kaypro offered larger 9-inch (230 mm) screens. Apple Computer's offerings had a large software library of their own and with aftermarket cards, could run CP/M as well. IBM's PC was faster, more advanced, and offered a rapidly growing software library, and Osborne's efforts to raise $20 million in capital to rush an IBM-compatible computer to market were unsuccessful.

=== The Osborne effect ===
According to proponents of the Osborne effect theory, Adam Osborne damaged his company's current sales when he began showing the Osborne Executive to journalists in early 1983. Dealers rapidly started cancelling orders for the Osborne 1 in anticipation of the new Executive. Unsold inventory piled up and in spite of dramatic price cuts – the Osborne 1 was selling for $1295 in July 1983 and $995 by August – sales did not recover. Losses, already higher than expected, continued to mount, and OCC declared bankruptcy on September 13, 1983. Disagreement exists on whether the Osborne Effect truly caused the company to collapse, with Robert X. Cringely and Charles Eicher attributing its failure to other causes.

=== Bankruptcy ===
When it was apparent that the company would be closing down, a company meeting was held with all employees. The first round of layoffs involved sales staff, production staff, domestic marketing and most mid to low-level clerical support. These employees were presented with their paychecks only. The management that remained was primarily from the international marketing division.

Nine days later on September 22, 1983, a group of 24 investors filed suit against OCC and several individuals, seeking $8.5 million in damages for masking the company's true financial situation and accusing several directors of the company of insider trading. Osborne emerged from bankruptcy in 1984 and released the Osborne Vixen, a compact portable running CP/M, in late 1984, along with the Morrow Pivot-based Osborne 3 (known as the Osborne Encore overseas). However, the company never regained its early prominence. A last-ditch effort to create a fully IBM-compatible Osborne produced three prototypes, but too late to save the company from bankruptcy.

Commercial rights for the Osborne brand name were later acquired by the Finnish clone PC maker Mikrolog Ltd which sold its server and desktop PCs domestically under the previously world famous name until 2021, when Mikrolog went bankrupt.
