= Paperback Software =

Former software company

Paperback Software International
- Type: Limited
- Industry: Software engineering
- Founded: 1983
- Founder: Adam Osborne
- Defunct: 1990
- Fate: Dissolved
- Headquarters: Berkeley, California, United States

Paperback Software International Ltd. was a software company founded in 1983 by Adam Osborne to manufacture discount software such as word processor Paperback Writer and related spell checker Paperback Speller, spreadsheet VP-Planner, database VP-Info, and the VP-Expert artificial intelligence software. VP-Planner was developed by James Stephenson of Stephenson Software Ltd. VP-Expert was developed by Brian Sawyer. The company was headquartered in Berkeley, California.

== History ==
The company was found by a United States court to have infringed on copyright for reproducing the appearance and menu system of Lotus 1-2-3 in its competing spreadsheet program, even though they did use different source code. The loss of this lawsuit was the main cause for the foundering of the company.

== Overview ==
Not only was VP Planner cheaper, it was regarded by some as better. Adam Osborne's US Paperback Software business folded following lengthy litigation with Lotus Development. The litigation began in 1987, when Lotus initially won a copyright claim in 1990 against Paperback Software. Lotus sued Borland over the latter's Quattro Pro spreadsheet but, after six years of litigation, lost the lawsuit. The court ruled that it is not copyright infringement to use the Lotus interface as a subset, but, by then, Paperback Software had folded, and Lotus 1-2-3 had faced intense competition from Microsoft Excel.

== Legacy ==
VP-Info remains in use and continues to be available for download from public software archives, and through the Wayback Machine. VP-Info was revised and updated and re-published by SubRosa Corporation as the Shark database management application. VP-Expert was the top-selling expert systems development tool, with over 120,000 units sold and site licenses at DuPont, Kodak, and the Wharton School of Business.
