= Self-competition =

Economic competition within a company

In business, self-competition is competition by a company with itself for customers. This can include one product competing with another substitutable product sold by the same company, or two or more retail locations for the same company competing with each other.

== Types ==
=== Product self-competition ===
Any company which provides multiple products may suffer from product self-competition. Similar products are more likely to have this issue. For example, a bakery which offers raspberry muffins and then adds blackberry muffins will likely see a decline in sales of the original product, although the total sales of both products will likely be higher than the original single product. If total sales do not increase, then this will have a negative impact on the business. However, even if total sales do increase slightly, this may still lower profits, as producing two products increases costs over a single product. Therefore, only a large increase in total sales would justify the addition of the new product.

In order to limit self-competition, new products should ideally be significantly different from existing products. In the bakery example, bran muffins would create less competition with raspberry muffins. Adding whole loaves of bread to the product mix would create even less competition.

=== Retail location self-competition ===
A related issue involves two retail locations for the same company that are situated close to one another. The first location will likely see a decline in business when the new location is added. Just how far away two locations must be to avoid this effect depends on the type of business. For newspaper stands, they could be relatively close, as customers are often on foot and unlikely to walk more than block or two. For amusement parks, the distances must be much larger, as people are willing to drive long distances to spend the day at such an attraction. In the case of ski resorts, people are even willing to fly long distances. Furthermore, franchisers, like McDonald's, do not actually allow for their products to be placed within a certain mile radius of an already established franchise.

=== Proximity-based ===
Sometimes, there will be two separate instances of a retail business less than a half mile apart. For instance, Subway has become a densely populated fast food franchise, and the opening of Wal-Mart stores has resulted in internal competition with separate Subway restaurants nearby since Subway has been integrated into Wal-Mart stores.

=== As a stop-gap measure ===
Sometimes, brief internal competition can be a consequence of having clearance items in a store's inventory, in which prices are decreased to encourage customers to clear out the clearance items. Other tactics can involve delaying introduction of some versions of certain products since it can also save some companies money.

== Causes ==
=== Effects of mergers and acquisitions on self-competition ===
Self-competition is a common side-effect of mergers and acquisitions, as the new combined business often has similar products and nearby retail locations. The success of the business often depends on their ability to eliminate similar products and redundant retail locations. Ideally, the most profitable products and locations should be kept, regardless of the source company. In some cases, the best attributes of each product may be retained. For example, one company may offer a superior food product, but the other may have better packaging, perhaps a resealable bag.

=== Effects of scale on self-competition ===
While any company which offers more than a single product can suffer from the effects of self-competition, the larger a company becomes, in terms of market share, the more it becomes an issue. In the case of General Motors, they were eventually forced to drop their entire Oldsmobile line, as it was largely redundant with Buick, and to a smaller extent Chevrolet, though Pontiac which also later got axed as well had a sporty flare to it which made it look less redundant.

== See also ==
- Competition (economics)
- Diseconomy of scale
- Osborne effect
