= West Coast Computer Faire =

Annual computer industry expo in San Francisco, California from 1977 to 1991

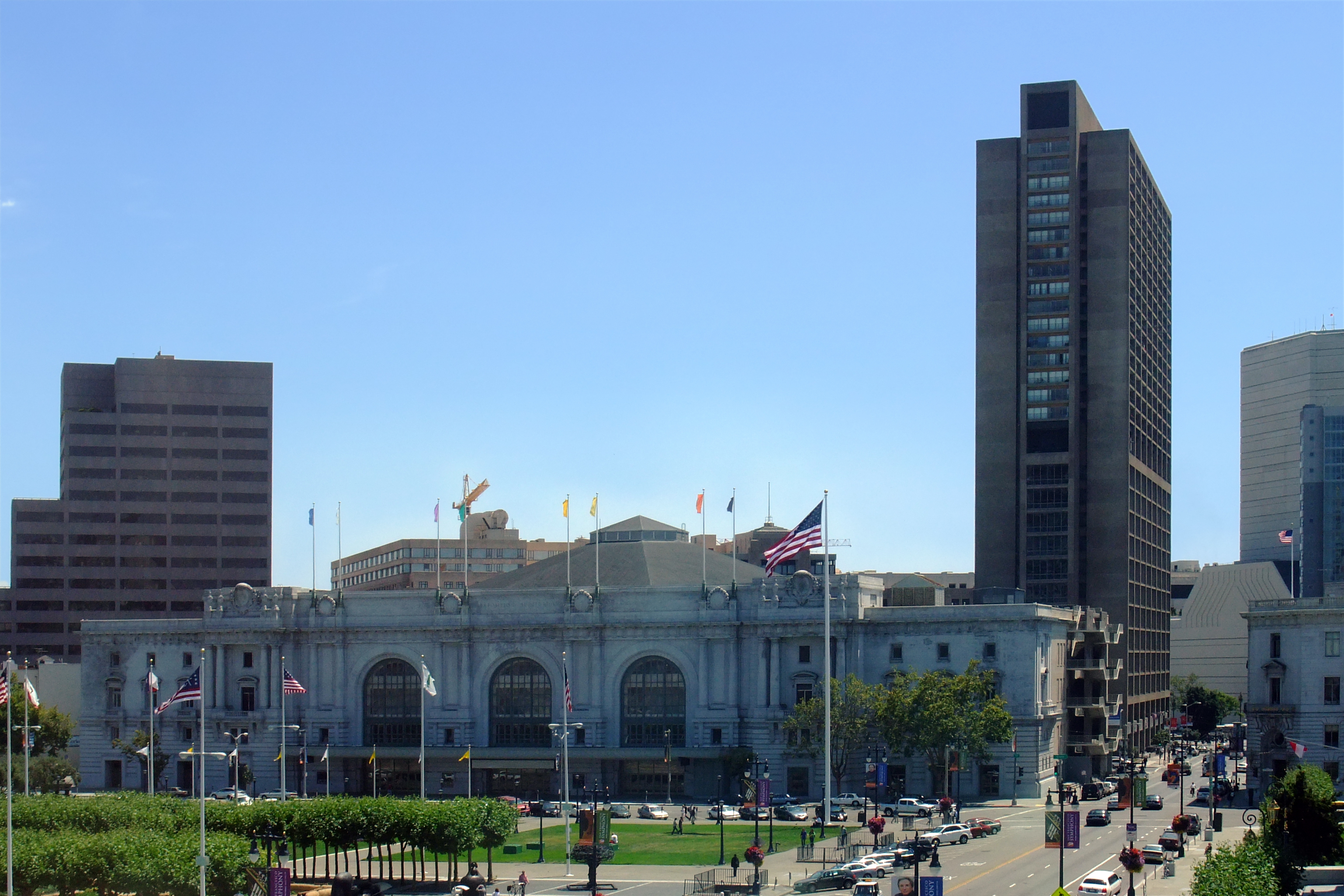
- Civic Auditorium (c. 2008)
- Status: Defunct
- Genre: Conference, exhibition
- Frequency: Annually
- Locations: San Francisco, California, United States
- Inaugurated: April 16, 1977
- Most recent: 1991

The West Coast Computer Faire was an annual computer trade show and conference from 1977 to 1991 primarily held in San Francisco, California. It was co-founded by Jim Warren and Bob Reiling. At its inception, it was the largest computer trade show globally and was instrumental in promoting the adoption of personal computers for home use.

To accommodate a more focused market, a specialized spin-off event called the West Coast PC Faire was later introduced. In 1983, Warren sold the operating rights for the Faire to Prentice Hall for US$3 million. The event was subsequently acquired by Sheldon Adelson, whose Interface Group also owned and operated COMDEX. Spanning fourteen years, the West Coast Computer Faire hosted a total of sixteen exhibitions before concluding with its final show in 1991.

== History ==
The first fair took place on April 15–17, 1977, in San Francisco Civic Auditorium, and saw the debut of the Commodore PET, presented by Chuck Peddle, and the Apple II, presented by 22-year-old Steve Jobs and 26-year-old Steve Wozniak. At the exhibition, Jobs introduced the Apple II to Japanese textile maker Toshio Mizushima, who became the first authorized Apple dealer in Japan. Other visitors included Tomio Gotō who developed the TK-80 and PC-8001, and Kazuhiko Nishi who produced the MSX. There were about 180 exhibitors, among them Intel, MITS, and Digital Research.

When the first fair opened, almost twice as many people arrived as Warren anticipated, and thousands of people were waiting to get into the auditorium. More than 12,000 people visited the fair.

As Jim Warren later recalled: “We had these lines running all around the fucking building and nobody was irritated. Nobody was pushy. We didn’t know what we were doing and the exhibitors didn’t know what they were doing and the attendees didn’t know what was going on, but everybody was excited and congenial and undemanding and it was a tremendous turn-on. People just stood and talked—‘Oh, you’ve got an Altair? Far out!’ ‘You solved this problem?’ And nobody was irritated.” ... The first Computer Faire was to the hardware hackers an event comparable to Woodstock in the movement of the sixties. Like the concert at Max Yasgur’s farm, this was both a cultural vindication and a signal that the movement had gotten so big that it no longer belonged to its progenitors.

— Steven Levy (1984). Hackers: Heroes of the Computer Revolution.

The 2nd West Coast Computer Faire was held March 3–5, 1978, at what was then the San Jose Convention Center. This event had the first-ever microcomputer chess tournament, won by Sargon.

The 3rd West Coast Computer Faire was held on November 3–5, 1978, at the Los Angeles Convention Center.

The 4th West Coast Computer Faire returned to San Francisco in May 1979 at Brooks Hall and Civic Auditorium. Dan Bricklin demonstrated VisiCalc, the first spreadsheet program for personal computers.

At the 5th West Coast Computer Faire, held in March 1980, Microsoft announced their first hardware product, the Z-80 SoftCard, which gave the Apple II CP/M capabilities.

The 6th West Coast Computer Faire was held on April 3–5, 1981, notable for being the venue where Adam Osborne introduced the Osborne 1.

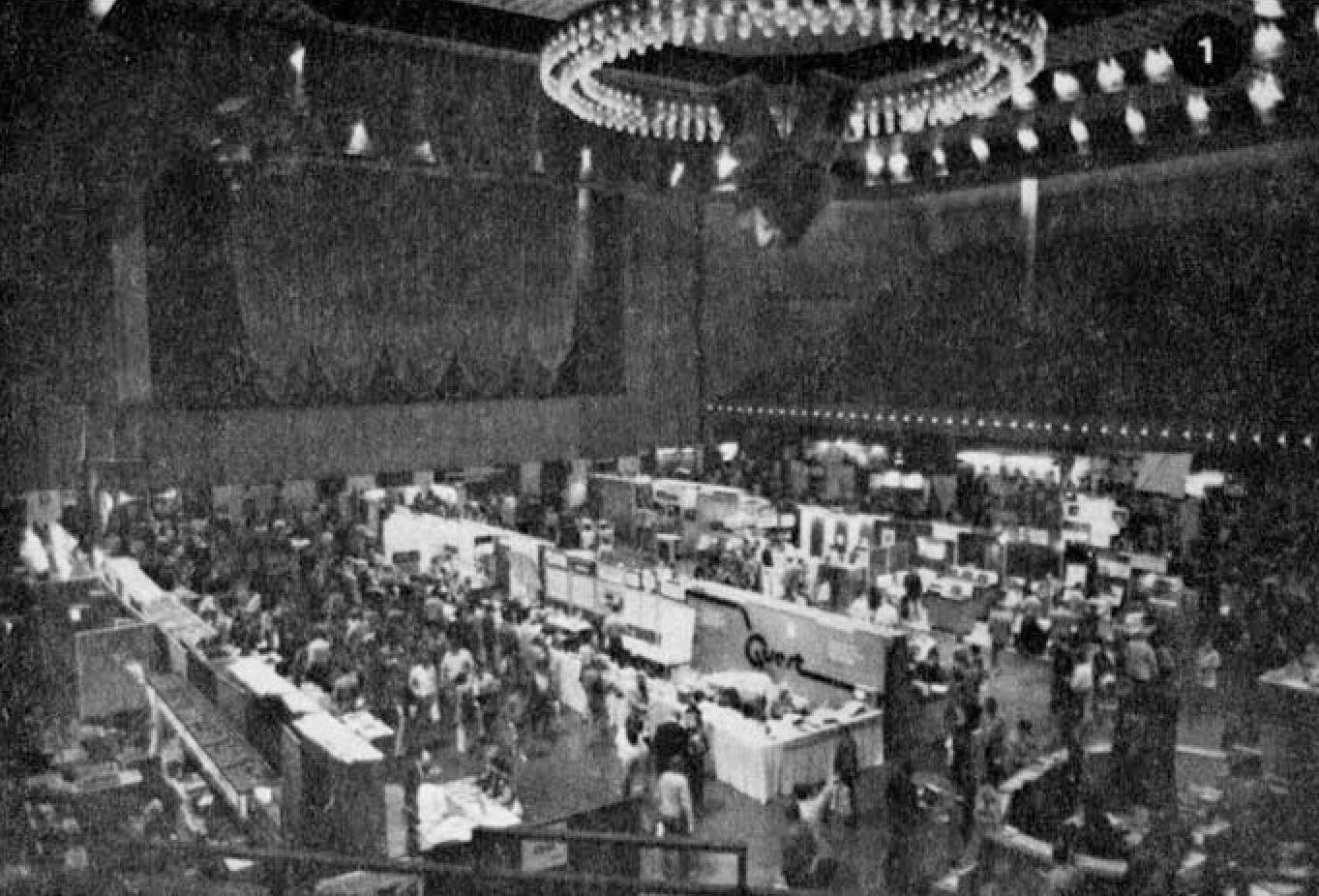
The 7th West Coast Computer Faire, as printed in issue 2.3 of Computer Gaming World

The 7th West Coast Computer Faire saw the introduction of the 5 MB Winchester disk drive for IBM PCs by Davong Systems. It was held on March 19–21, 1982, in San Francisco. That year's conference also featured a Saturday breakout session, titled "THE IBM PERSONAL COMPUTER", with eight talks delivered in a three-hour period. One of these was (as listed in the program):

P.C. — It's [sic] Impact on the MicroComputer Industry 
Bill Gates, President
Microsoft
10800 N.E. 8th #819
Bellevue, WA 98004

At its peak, all available spaces for exhibits were rented out, including the balcony of Civic Auditorium, and the hallway to the restrooms in Brooks Hall (where Bob Wallace ("Quicksoft") introduced "PC-Write").

The 8th West Coast Computer Faire was held March 18–20, 1983.

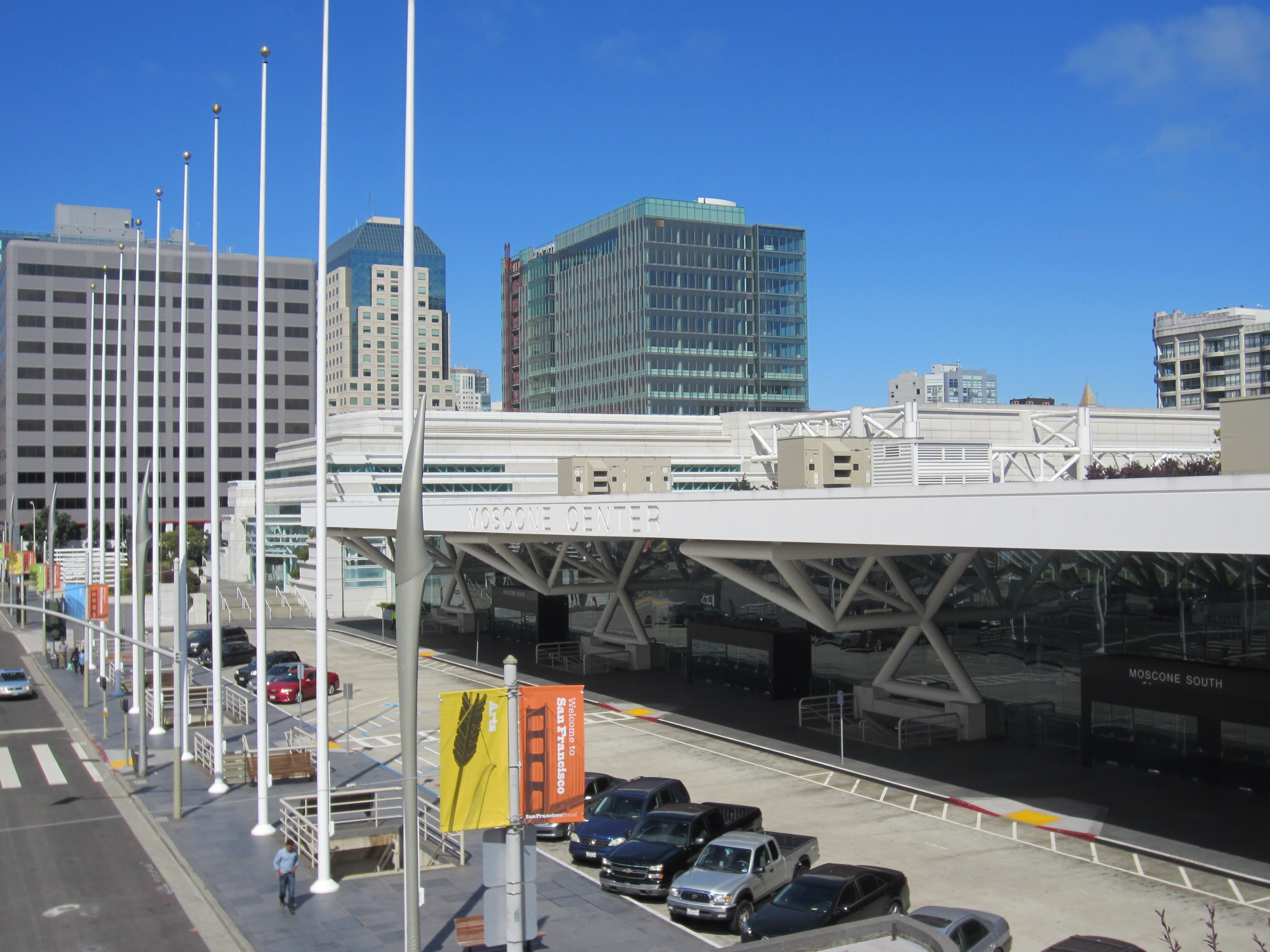
Moscone Center, San Francisco (2013)

Subsequent West Coast Computer Faires were held in Moscone Center in San Francisco. After the 10th Faire, Bruce Webster wrote that "Warren sold out just in time. The Faire is shrinking. It may not be dying, but it is no longer the important trade show it was two short years ago. Without the giant booths from IBM, Apple, and AT&T, the Faire would have looked like any other small, local, end-user show. The move to the Moscone Center didn't help that impression; a large chunk of the main floor was unused, adding to the impression of the Faire's shrunken size".

The 12th West Coast Computer Faire was held in March 1987.

The 16th West Coast Computer Faire was held from May 30 to June 2, 1991, at Moscone Center.

== West Coast IBM PC Faire, SF ==
First West Coast IBM PC Faire, August 26–28, 1983 in San Francisco, CA, was presented by Computer Faire, Inc., Redwood City, CA.

== Personal Computer Faire, SF ==
Third Personal Computer Faire September 5–7, 1985 in San Francisco, CA was presented by Computer Faire, Inc., Newton, MA.

Fourth Personal Computer Faire, in San Francisco, was presented September 25–27, 1986, by The Interface Group, Needham, Mass.

== Northeast Computer Faire ==
The Northeast Computer Faire in Boston, was presented by Computer Faire Inc., Newton, Mass., a subsidiary of Prentice-Hall.

The Eighth Northeast Computer Faire, September 26–29, 1985, Bayside Exposition Center. Boston. MA. was presented by Computer Faire Inc., Newton, MA.

The 11th Northeast Computer Faire, which ran October 27-29, 1988, was presented by The Interface Group and Boston Computer Society in Boston.

== Southern California Computer Faire ==
Southern California Computer Faire was presented by Computer Faire Inc., Newton, Mass., a subsidiary of Prentice-Hall.
