= Osborne 1 =

Early portable microcomputer

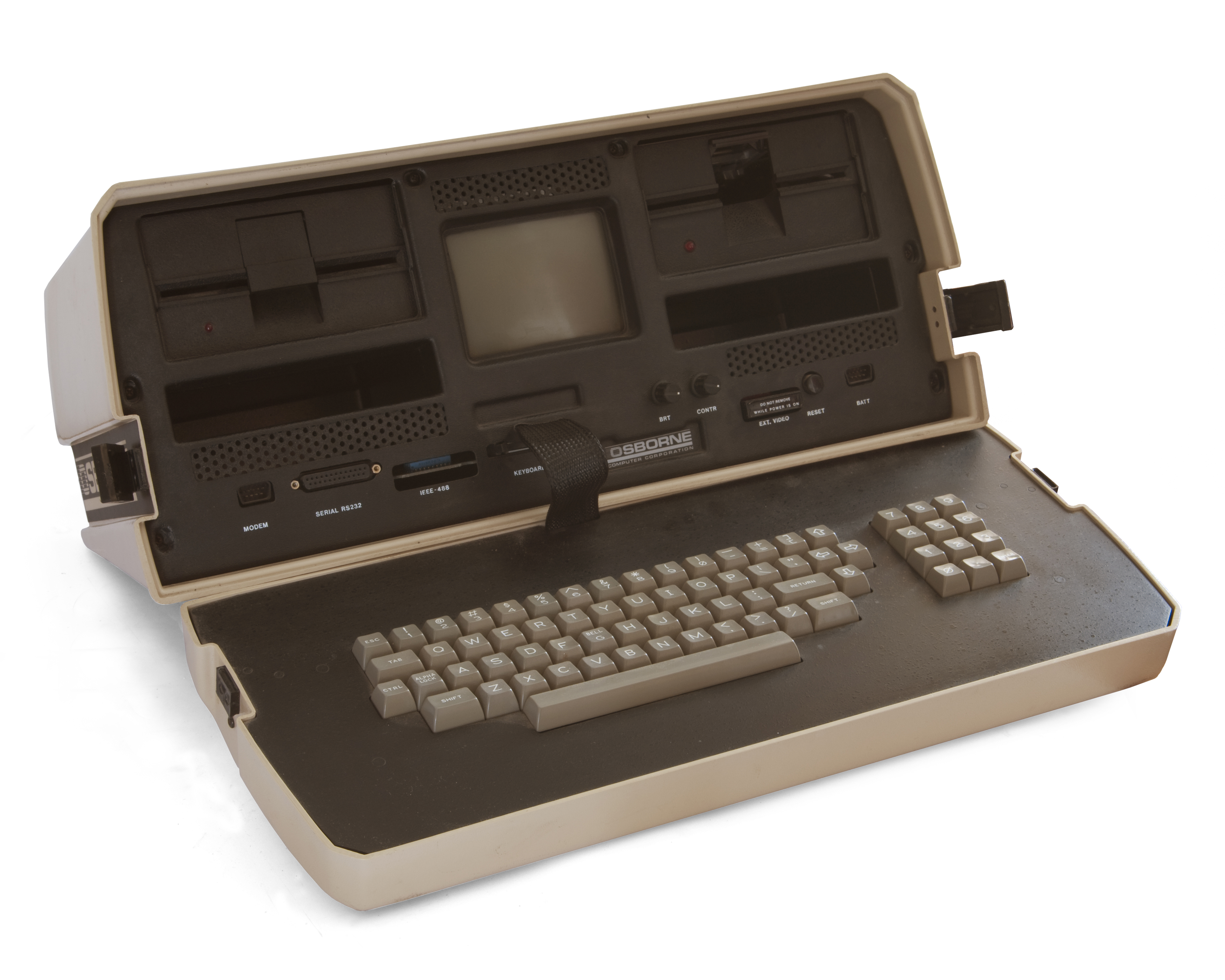
- Also known as: OCC-1
- Developer: Adam Osborne
- Manufacturer: Osborne Computer Corporation
- Type: Portable computer
- Released: April 3, 1981; 45 years ago
- Introductory price: US$1795 (today $6360)
- Discontinued: 1983
- Operating system: CP/M
- CPU: Zilog Z80 @ 4 MHz
- Memory: 64 KB RAM
- Storage: Dual 5¼-inch, single-sided, single-density floppy drives (optional dual-density upgrade)
- Display: 5-inch monochrome CRT display, 52 × 24 characters text
- Graphics: TTL logic
- Power: 37 watts max
- Dimensions: W: 20.5 inches (52 cm); H: 9 inches (23 cm); D: 13 inches (33 cm)
- Weight: 24.5 lb (11.1 kg)
- Successor: Osborne Executive

The Osborne 1 is the first commercially successful portable computer, released on April 3, 1981, by Osborne Computer Corporation. It weighs 24.5 lb (11.1 kg), cost US$1,795, and runs the CP/M 2.2 operating system. It is powered from a wall socket, as it has no on-board battery, but it is still classed as a portable device since it can be hand-carried when the keyboard is closed.

The computer shipped with a large bundle of software that was almost equivalent in value to the machine itself, a practice adopted by other CP/M computer vendors. Competitors quickly appeared, such as the Kaypro II.

== History ==
The Osborne 1 was developed by Adam Osborne and designed by Lee Felsenstein, first announced in early 1981. Osborne, an author of computer books, decided that he wanted to break the price of computers. The computer's design was based largely on the Micro Star (later marketed as The Small One), a luggable computer patented and released by GM Research (not to be confused with General Motors) in July 1979, and shown at that year's COMDEX, which Osborne attended. It was designed to be portable, with a rugged ABS plastic case and a handle. The Osborne 1 is about the size and weight of a sewing machine and was advertised as the only computer that would fit underneath an airline seat. It is a luggable when compared to those later laptop designs such as the Epson HX-20.

The Osborne 1 was described as "a cross between a World War II field radio and a shrunken instrument panel of a DC-3", and Felsenstein admitted that carrying two of them to a trade show "nearly pulled my arms out of their sockets". Although the computer's exterior did not impress West Coast Computer Faire attendees, it nonetheless amazed observers; InfoWorld reported that "By far the most frequently asked question ... was, 'What do you think of the new Osborne computer?'" BYTE Magazine wrote: "(1) it will cost $1795, and (2) it's portable!" The word processing, spreadsheet, and other bundled software alone was worth $1,500; as InfoWorld stated in an April 1981 front-page article on the new computer after listing the included software, "In case you think the price printed above was a mistake, we'll repeat it: $1795".

West Coast Computer Faire attendees stated, InfoWorld said, that the Osborne 1 "represented an advancement of the price/performance ratio for microcomputers". Adam Osborne agreed but emphasized the price, stating that its performance was "merely adequate": "It is not the fastest microcomputer, it doesn't have huge amounts of disk storage space, and it is not especially expandable." Beyond the price, advertisements emphasized the computer's portability and bundled software. The company sold 11,000 units in the first eight months of sales, and sales at their peak reached 10,000 units per month.

The Osborne 1's principal deficiencies are a tiny 5-inch (13 cm) display screen, use of single-sided, single-density floppy disk drives that store 90 kB per disk, and considerable unit weight. Adam Osborne decided to use single-sided disk drives out of concern about double-sided drives suffering head damage from rough handling. A single-density disk controller was used to keep costs down.

In September 1981, Osborne Computer Company had its first $1 million sales month. Sales were hurt by the company's premature announcement of superior successor machines such as the Osborne Executive, which replaced the Osborne 1's 52-column screen with an 80-column screen. This phenomenon was later called the Osborne effect. From 1982 to 1985, the company published The Portable Companion, a magazine for Osborne users.

=== Early production ===
The company initially had ten prototypes produced, as described in an email by Felstenstein:

I can confirm that this is one of the first ten prototype units built, known as the "metal case" units. I don't think they had serial numbers. The cases were made by Galgon Industries in Hayward, California but their quote for production was prohibitive, so work immediately commenced on the plastic cases. The circuit board was ready in January 1981 and these were built shortly thereafter. They were used in the first ads ("the guy on the left doesn't stand a chance") in which the veins on the hand of the guy on the right bulge as he struggles with the 30-pound weight of his transformer-powered luggable. These were the units we took to the West Coast Computer Faire and the National Computer Conference in early 1981.

=== Competition ===
The computer was widely imitated as several other computer companies began offering low-priced portable computers with bundled software. The Osborne's popularity was surpassed by the similar Kaypro II; which has a larger, 9-inch (23 cm) CRT that can display 80 characters on 24 lines, and double density floppies that can store twice as much data. Osborne Computer Corporation was unable to effectively respond to Kaypro until after 8-bit, CP/M-based computers were obsolete.

In August of 1981, IBM released the IBM PC, which is significantly more powerful and expandable. Following the release of the IBM-compatible Compaq Portable in 1983, the market for CP/M computers shrank and Osborne was unable to compete.

== Architecture ==
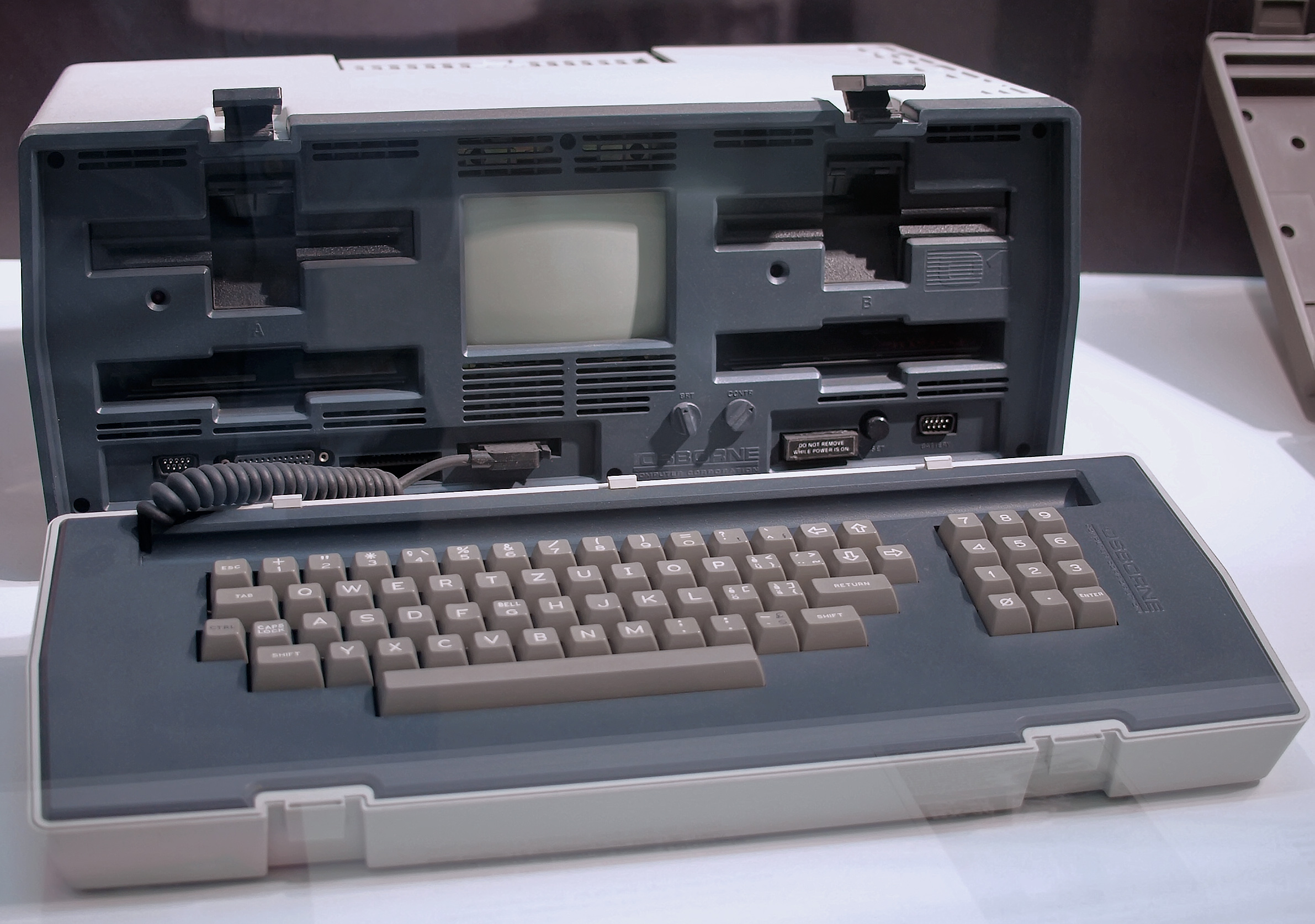
Later-model Osborne 1 with the redesigned case

The 64 KB main memory is made of four rows of eight type 4116 dynamic RAM chips, each with 16,384 bits. Memory is shared, with 60 KB available for software and 4 KB reserved for video memory. No parity is provided and no provision for memory expansion exists on the motherboard. The boot program loader and significant parts of the BIOS are stored in a 4 kilobyte EPROM, which is bank-switched. A second EPROM is used as a fixed character generator, providing 96 upper and lower case ASCII characters and 32 graphic symbols; the character generator is not accessible to the CPU. The eighth bit of an ASCII character is used to select underlined characters. Serial communications are through a memory-mapped Motorola MC6850 Asynchronous Communications Interface Adapter (ACIA); a jumper on the motherboard allows the MC6850 to be set for either 300 and 1200 baud or 600 and 2400 baud communications, but other bit rates are not available.

The floppy disk drives are interfaced through a Fujitsu 8877 disk controller integrated circuit, a second-source of the Western Digital 1793. The parallel port is connected through a memory-mapped Motorola MC6821 Peripheral Interface Adapter (PIA) which allows the port to be fully bidirectional; the Osborne manuals state that the port implemented the IEEE-488 interface bus but this is rarely used. The parallel port uses a card-edge connector etched on the main board, exposed through a hole in the case; any IEEE-488 or printer cable has to be modified for the Osborne.

The diskette drives installed in the Osborne 1 are Siemens FDD 100-5s (MPI drives were also used later), which were actually manufactured in California by GSI, a drive manufacturer that the German firm had purchased. They utilize a custom controller board that Osborne produced, which among other things has a single connector for the power and data lines. The FDD 100-5 was trouble-prone as Osborne's quality control was lacking, and many of the controller boards have soldering defects. In addition, the drive cable is not keyed and can be easily installed upside-down, which shorts out components in the computer. There are also problems with the drive head going past track 0 and getting stuck in place. The combo power/data cable also has a tendency of overheating.

The video system uses part of the main memory and TTL logic to provide video and sync to an internal 5-inch (13 cm) monochrome monitor. The same signals are provided on a card-edge connector for an external monitor; both internal and external monitor display the same video format. The internal monitor is specified as 3.55" horizontal, and 2.63" vertical making the actual viewing size even smaller at 4.42". Osborne also provided a 12" GM-12 external monitor.

The processor, memory, floppy controller, PIA, ACIA and EPROMs are interconnected with standard TTL devices.

The Osborne 1 has bank switched memory. Unusual for a system based on the Z80, all I/O is memory mapped, and the Z80 I/O instructions are only used to select memory banks. Bank 1 is "normal" mode, where user programs run; this includes a 4 KB area at the top of the address space which is video memory. Bank 2 is called "shadow". The first 4 KB of this address space is the ROM, and 4 KB is reserved for the on-board I/O ports: the disk controller, the keyboard, the parallel port PIA, the serial port ACIA, and a second PIA chip used for the video system. All memory above the first 16 KB is the same memory as Bank 1. This is the mode of the system on power up, because this is where the boot ROM was mapped. Bank 3 has only 4 KB by 1 bit of memory, used solely to hold the "dim" attribute of the video system.

=== Operating system ===
The computer runs on the CP/M 2.2 operating system. A complete listing of the ROM BIOS is in the Osborne technical manual.

=== Software ===
The 500+ page Osborne 1 user manual contains instructions on the hardware, WordStar, SuperCalc, BASIC software and the CP/M operating system and utilities.

The Osborne 1 came with a bundle of application software with a retail value of more than US$1,500, including the WordStar word processor, SuperCalc spreadsheet, and the CBASIC and MBASIC programming languages. The exact contents of the bundled software varied depending on the time of purchase; for example, dBASE II was included with later systems but not with the first systems sold.

| Program Name | Version | Published by | Program Type | Date | Part Number | Number of Disks |
|---|---|---|---|---|---|---|
| CP/M | 2.2 | Digital Research | Disk Operating System | 1981 | 3D01140-01 | 1 |
| AMCALL | 2.06 | MicroCall Services | Communications program | | 2B50002-00 | 1 |
| CBASIC2 | | Digital Research | Language compiler | 1979 | | |
| MBASIC | | Microsoft | Language interpreter | | 301002-02D | 1 |
| Adventure | | | Game | | | |
| dBASE II | 2.41 | Ashton-Tate | Database | | | |
| dBASE II Tutor | | Ashton-Tate | Training for database | | | 6 |
| Grammatik | 1.82 | Aspen Software Co. | Grammar checker | 1981 | 2G04401-00 | 1 |
| Proofreader | | Aspen Software Co. | Dictionary | | | |
| Nominal Ledger | 2.7 | PeachTree Software | Business Software | 1983 | 2X09200-04 | 2 |
| Purchase Ledger | 2.7 | PeachTree Software | Business Software | 1983 | 2X09200-04 | 2 |
| Sales Ledger | 2.7 | PeachTree Software | Business Software | 1983 | 2X09200-04 | 2 |
| SuperCalc | 1.12 | Sorcim | Spreadsheet | 1981 | 301002-03 or 3D01160-01 | 1 |
| WordStar | 2.26 | MicroPro | Word processor | 1981 | 3D01150-01 | 1 |
| ChekWiz | | Wizard of OsZ | Cheque handling software | | | 1 |
| Plink & RCPMPlink | 1.4 | Wizard of OsZ | Transfer utility for Bulletin board system | | | 1 |
| OSBOARD 1 | | Wizard of OsZ | Graphics Generator including Forms and logo creation | | | 1 |
| Wizdex | | Wizard of OsZ | Utility for Wordstar - Generates sortable index for a text file | | | 1 |
| Games Disk 4 | | Wizard of OsZ | 2D Maze, 3D Maze, Bounce and Lander | | | 1 |
| Games Disk 5 | | Wizard of OsZ | Blackjack & Spacewar | | | 1 |
| Games Disk 6 | | Wizard of OsZ | Educational games inc Ghosts in the Chimney | | | 1 |
| Games Disk 1 | | Wizard of OsZ | Othello, Castle Wahoo | | | 1 |
| Games Disk 2 | | Wizard of OsZ | Chess, Oracle, Startrek | | | 1 |
| Games Disk 3 | | Wizard of OsZ | Bomber, Lunar, Maze, Backgammon | | | 1 |

There are 18 known commercial games for the Osborne 1:

| Name | Year | Publisher |
|---|---|---|
| Cutthroats | 1984 | Infocom |
| Deadline | 1982 | Infocom |
| Enchanter | 1983 | Infocom |
| Infidel | 1983 | Infocom |
| Invaders | 1982 | The Software Toolworks |
| Management Simulator | 1981 | DynaComp, Inc. |
| Munchkin | 1982 | The Software Toolworks |
| Planetfall | 1983 | Infocom |
| Sorcerer | 1984 | Infocom |
| Space Pirates | 1983 | The Software Toolworks |
| Starcross | 1982 | Infocom |
| Suspended | 1983 | Infocom |
| The HitchHiker's Guide to the Galaxy | 1984 | Infocom |
| The Original Adventure | 1982 | The Software Toolworks |
| The Witness | 1983 | Infocom |
| Zork I - The Great Underground Empire | 1980 | Infocom |
| Zork II - The Wizard of Frobozz | 1981 | Infocom |
| Zork III - The Dungeon Master | 1982 | Infocom |

=== Hardware ===
- Dual 5¼-inch, single-sided, single-density 40-track floppy disk drives ("dual-density" upgrade available)
- 4 MHz Z80 CPU
- 64 KB main memory
- Fold-down 69-key detachable keyboard doubling as the computer case's lid
- 5-inch, 52-character × 24-line monochrome CRT display, mapped as a window on 128 × 32 character display memory
- Parallel printer port configurable as an IEEE-488 port
- RS-232 compatible 1200 or 300 baud serial port for use with external modems or serial printers

The Osborne 1 is powered by a wall plug with a switched-mode power supply, and has no internal battery. An aftermarket battery pack offering 1-hour run-time is available, and connects to the system through a front panel socket. OCC also sold the POWR-PAC inverter that allows running an Osborne from a 12 volt car cigarette lighter. Early models (tan case) are wired for 120 V or 240 V only. Later models (blue case, AKA Osborne 1A/1B, shipping after May 1982) can be switched by the user to run on either 120 V or 230 V, 50 or 60 Hz. There is no internal fan; a hatch at the top of the Osborne 1A/1B (blue case) can be slid open for ventilation.

=== Peripherals ===
Osborne and other companies produced many Osborne 1 accessories:

- External Monochrome display. This uses separate monochrome sync and video connections driven by the motherboard video circuitry.
- Parallel Dot matrix printer. Manufactured by Star.
- "Osborne DATACOM" 300 baud modem. Fits into the left diskette storage pocket and powered from the motherboard. Sold by OCC as the COMM-PAC which also included the AMCALL software.

Aftermarket vendors offered several other upgrades to the basic model, including third-party double density disk drives, external hard disks, and a battery-backed RAM disk that fits in a disk storage compartment.

Osborne Computer Corporation offered a "Screen-Pac" column upgrade that could be switched between original 52 column, 80 column and 104 column modes. Osborne 1 systems with the Screen-Pac upgrade have an RCA jack installed on the front panel to allow users to connect an external composite video monitor. This modification was developed in Australia by Geoff Cohen and Stuart Ritchie, and taken to the US by Stuart who turned up unannounced and sat outside Adam Osborne's office for two days. Osborne bought the mod and both of them worked with the company to implement the mod. As a nod toward where it came from, it was called the "Koala Project". Geoff Cohen developed other upgrades for Osbornes and was regarded as the Australian expert on the computers.

== Games ==
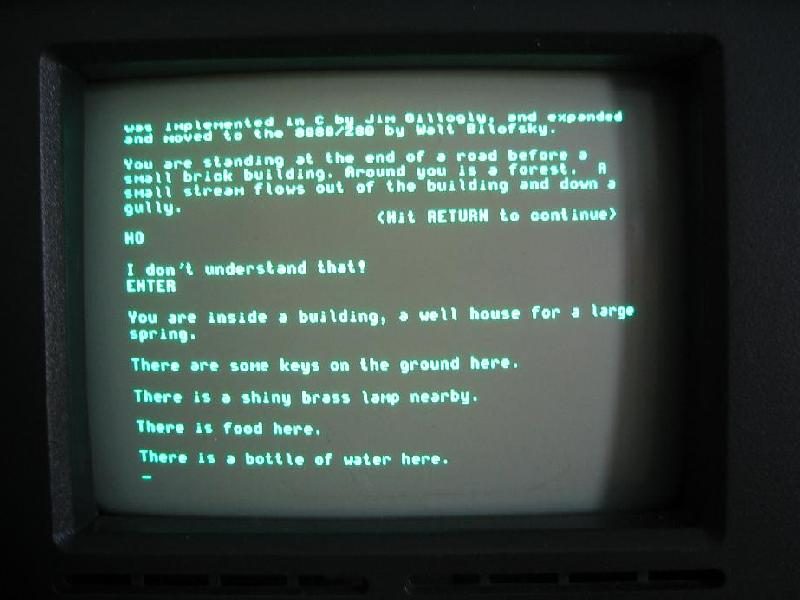
ADVENT (Colossal Cave Adventure) running on an Osborne Computer c. 1982

Since, like most CP/M systems, the display of the Osborne does not support bit-mapped graphics, games are typically character-based games, like Hamurabi or text adventures (the 1982 game Deadline, for example, packaged in a dossier-type folder and shipped on two 5 1/4" diskettes.). Compiled and MBASIC-interpreted versions of Colossal Cave Adventure are available for the Osborne. Some type-in games use the Osborne's character-mode graphics.

== Reception ==
InfoWorld reported that Osborne's booth at the April 1981 West Coast Computer Faire "was packed for the entire show". Some attendees praised the computer, while others said that the screen was too small; many agreed "that the Osborne 1 represented an advancement of the price/performance ratio for microcomputers", the magazine said. Jerry Pournelle wrote in BYTE that the small size of the screen surprised him by not being a problem, and stated that after using it at Caltech when Voyager 1 arrived at Saturn, "a dozen science writers were ready to go buy an Osborne 1". He reported that at the Citizens' Advisory Council on National Space Policy "I was able to type ... without disrupting the meeting at all. The Osborne 1 is quiet and efficient and not at all distracting". Pournelle said "You can't beat it for the price, under 2000 bucks with over a thousand dollars' worth of software. An Osborne and an Epson printer will put you in the computing/word-processing business cheaper than anything I can think of", and later described the computer as "the VW of the microcomputer field: It's cheap, reliable, handles standard programs well". A separate review in the magazine stated "If you need a solid, well-supported, well-documented business system at a reasonable price, you should give [the Osborne 1] a great deal of consideration". The reviewer calculated that after subtracting $1,530 for the retail price of the bundled software the price of the computer was "only $265 ... in a way you are getting a software package with a computer thrown in for (almost) free". He praised the quality of the documentation, and agreed with Pournelle that the screen's size did not cause difficulty. James Fallows agreed that the screen, although "the size of a postcard ... is much easier to read than that would suggest", and described the computer as "the best bargain on computer power in the business". Experts stated in 1983 that Osborne's bundled software was more appealing than portability, one stating "They are just so heavy. They are still not practical".

In 1981, the daily Israeli newspaper Maariv, provided several Osborne 1 to its reporters. The computers were equipped with acoustic couplers. This configuration allowed a reporter to submit an article digitally directly from the field to the newsroom. Maariv used a localized version of Osborne 1 that supported Hebrew. Freelance journalist David Kline praised the Osborne 1's durability, reporting in 1982 that the "damage inflicted by arrogant customs officers, airport police, vengeful Paris bellhops and opium-fogged Pakistani cabbies were entirely cosmetic". He wrote in 1983 that Osborne and other portable computers had "radically transformed my work [and] begun to radically reshape the entire field of journalism". Stating that a computer that weighs 30 pounds (14 kg) "really isn't very portable", Creative Computing in 1984 concluded that "the main reason that the Osborne was a success was not that it was transportable, but that it came with a pile of bundled software".
