= SuperCalc =

Spreadsheet software

Supercalc
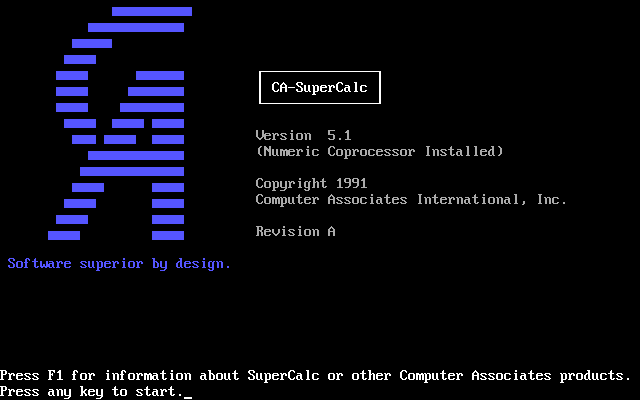
- SuperCalc 5.1 for MS-DOS.
- Developer: Sorcim
- Initial release: 1980; 46 years ago
- Stable release: 5.5
- Operating system: CP/M; MS-DOS; VMS
- Type: Spreadsheet

SuperCalc is a spreadsheet program published by Sorcim in 1980.

== History ==
VisiCalc was the first spreadsheet program, but at first was not available for the CP/M operating system. SuperCalc was created to serve that market. Alongside WordStar, it was one of the CP/M applications bundled with the Osborne 1 portable computer. It quickly became popular and was ported to MS-DOS in 1982.

An improvement over VisiCalc (though using much the same command structure using the slash key), SuperCalc was one of the first spreadsheet programs capable of iteratively solving circular references (cells that depend on each other's results). It would be over 10 years after the introduction of SuperCalc before this feature was implemented in Microsoft Excel, although in Lotus 1-2-3, manual programming of iterative logic could also be used to solve this issue. According to the SuperCalc product manager, iterative calculations were added when Sorcim changed from binary-coded decimal to binary math. Since the precision of the two math packages was different, some IF statements resolved differently, and iterative calculations helped solve this problem.

Versions of SuperCalc were later released for the Apple II, IBM PC compatibles running MS-DOS, and, after Sorcim was bought by CA Technologies in 1985, for Microsoft Windows (under the name CA-SuperCalc). SuperCalc was CA Technologies' first personal computer product. The MS-DOS versions were more popular with many users than the market-leading Lotus 1-2-3, because it was distributed without copy protection, as well as being priced lower.

Peachtree Software licensed SuperCalc's source code to produce PeachCalc.

By the release of version 3 in March 1987, a million users were claimed. New versions were published into the early 1990s, after which Microsoft Excel dominated the spreadsheet market.

In 1993, the Ministry of Railway of Russia signed an agreement with CA Technologies after a Russian employee illegally used SuperCalc for government purposes.

== Reception ==
Testing a prerelease version of SuperCalc for CP/M, InfoWorld in 1981 approved of its screen update speed and 80x24 screen size, built-in help and ease of use, error handling. The magazine in 1984 approved of SuperCalc 3 for DOS's graphics addition and continuing backward compatibility and lack of copy protection, stating that the $395 price was "a bargain for this type of product". InfoWorld in 1986 said that SuperCalc 4 was "neck and neck with Lotus ... a serious corporate spreadsheet alternative". It again approved of its upward and downward compatibility with the previous version, unlike Lotus, and ability to solve to a desired result. The magazine concluded that "SuperCalc 4 tackles the toughest competitor of them all on its own terms ... a very equal battle".

Jerry Pournelle of BYTE in 1982 praised Supercalc for CP/M's ease of use and documentation, and predicted that it "is destined to become a classic" like dBASE II, Spellguard, and WRITE. In a 1983 evaluation of eight spreadsheets for Heath/Zenith computers, Sextant stated that SuperCalc, like VisiCalc, caused people to buy computers to run it. The magazine approved of SuperCalc's speed and tutorial documentation, but criticized its inability to import or export data.

Computer Intelligence estimated in 1987 that Computer Associates had 4% of the Fortune 1000 PC financial analysis market, behind Lotus's 85% and Microsoft's 6%. A 1990 American Institute of Certified Public Accountants member survey found that 3% of respondents used SuperCalc as their spreadsheet, and 3% for graphics.

== Versions ==
- 1980: SuperCalc
- SuperCalc 2, which featured a novelty: Split screen with formulas on one side, and graphs on the other
- 1986: SuperCalc 4, evaluated #2 on the spreadsheets market after Excel, with introduction of automatic construction of macros
- 1989: SuperCalc 5
