= Adam Osborne =

British computer designer (1939–2003)

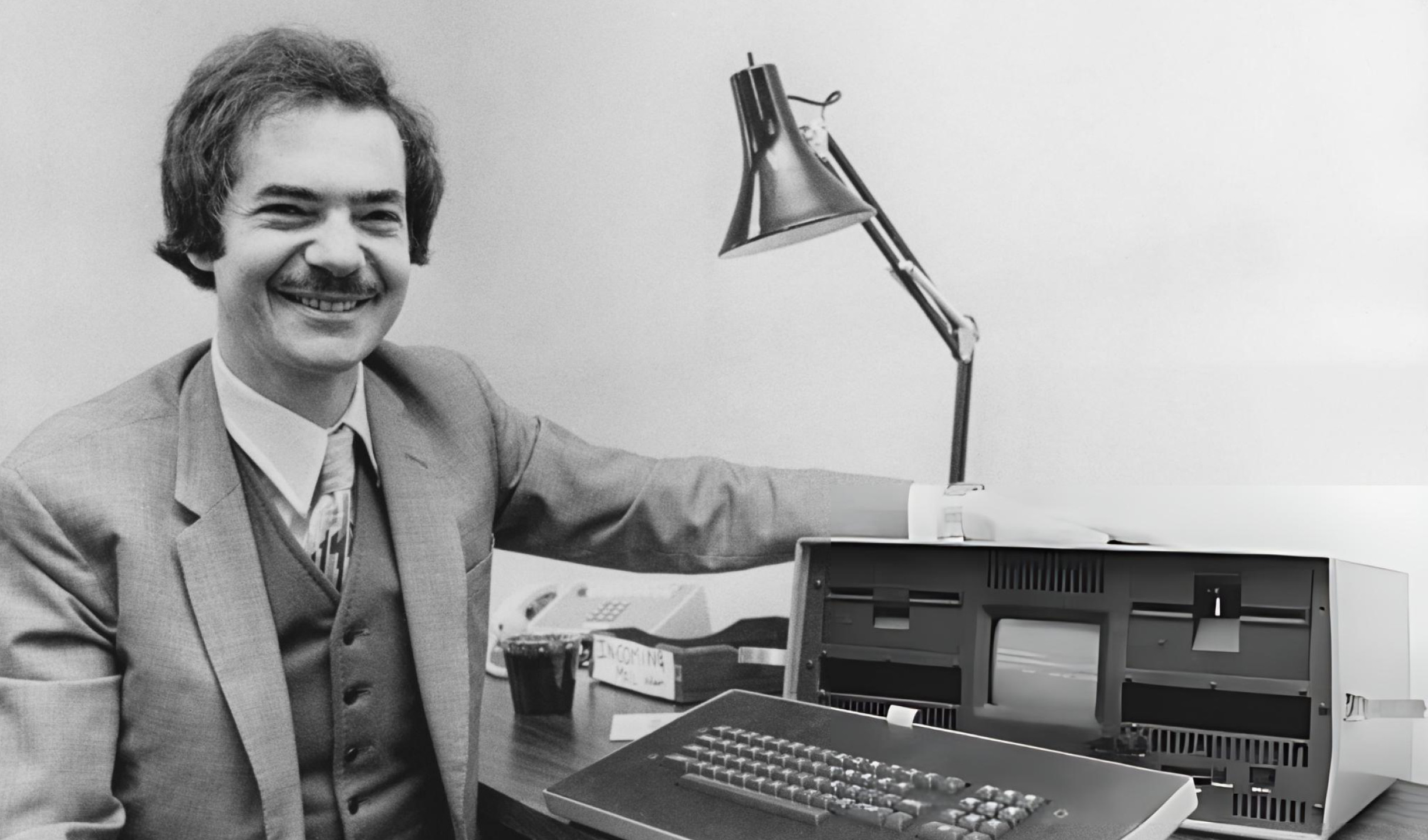
- Osborne with the Osborne 1 in 1981
- Born: 6 March 1939; Bangkok, Thailand
- Died: 18 March 2003 (aged 64); Kodaikanal, India
- Education: Leamington College for Boys; University of Birmingham; University of Delaware
- Known for: Osborne 1 portable computer
- Scientific career
- Fields: Computer engineering
- Workplaces: Shell Oil; Osborne Computer Corporation

Adam Osborne (6 March 1939 – 18 March 2003) was a British author, software publisher, and computer designer who founded several companies in the United States and elsewhere. He introduced the Osborne 1, the first commercially successful portable computer.

== Early life ==
Osborne was born to British parents in Bangkok, Thailand, on 6 March 1939. His father, Arthur Osborne, was a teacher of eastern religion and philosophy and a lecturer in English at Chulalongkorn University. All members of the family were fluent in the Tamil language. He spent World War II in Tiruvannamalai, in southern India, with his mother. There they were frequent visitors to Sri Ramana Maharshi's Ashram. He attended Presentation Convent School in Kodaikanal until Class 6. In 1950, the Osborne family moved back to England. From the age of 11, he was educated at a Catholic boarding school in Warwickshire but from 1954 to 1957 was a pupil at the grammar school Leamington College for Boys, where he played chess. He graduated with a degree in chemical engineering from the University of Birmingham in 1961, and received his PhD from the University of Delaware in 1968. It was while living in the United States that he learned to write computer code. He obtained a position as a chemical engineer with Shell Oil, in California, but was dismissed.

== Publishing ==
Osborne was a pioneer in the computer book field, founding a company in 1972 that specialized in easy-to-read computer manuals. By 1977, Osborne & Associates had 40 titles in its catalogue. In 1979, it was bought by McGraw-Hill and continued as an imprint of McGraw-Hill, "Osborne/McGraw-Hill". He also wrote several books. One of them, An Introduction To Microcomputers, sold 300,000 copies.

== Computers ==
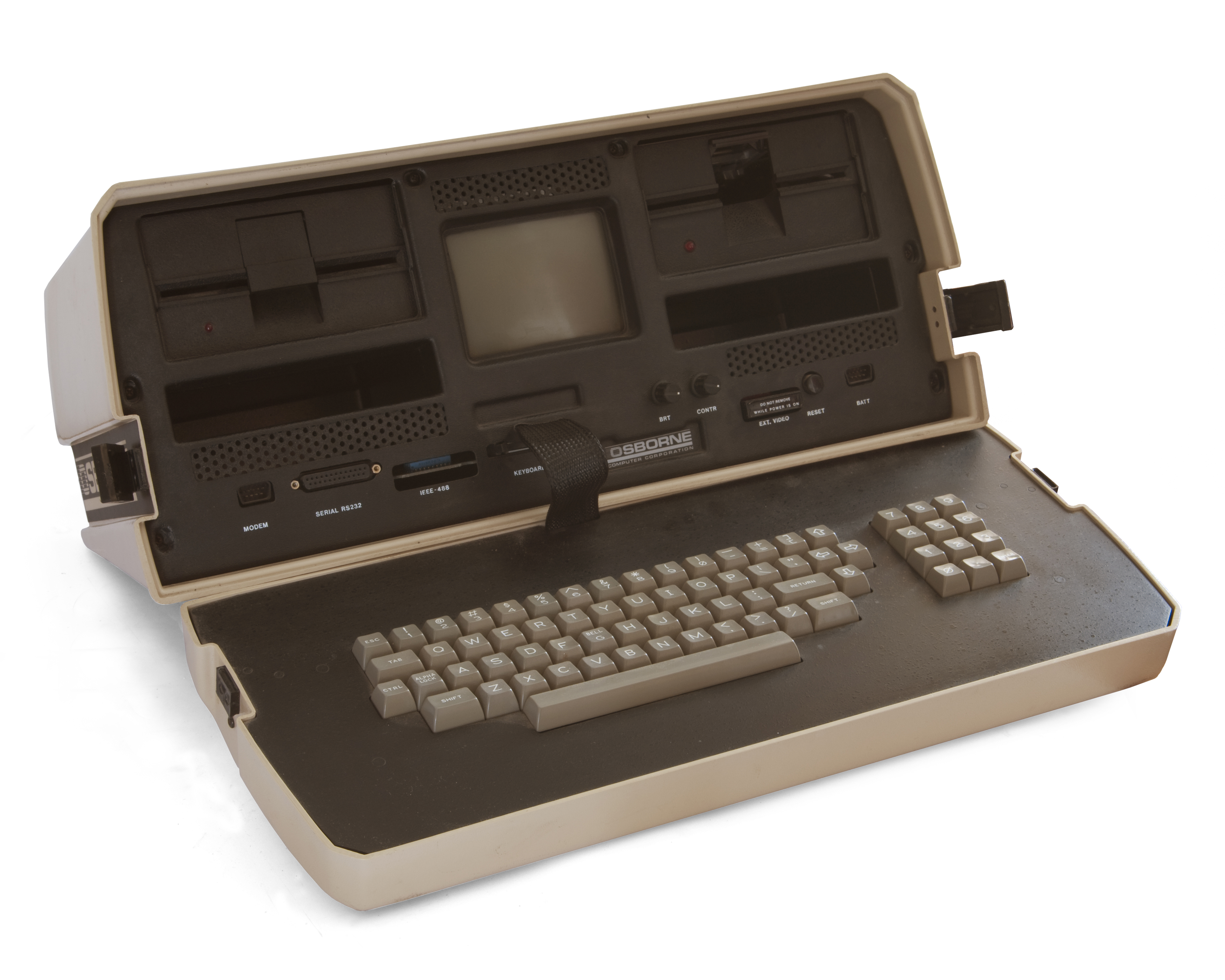
An Osborne 1 computer

Osborne was known to frequent the Homebrew Computer Club's meetings around 1975. He created the first commercially available portable computer, the Osborne 1, released in April 1981. It weighed 24.5 pounds (12 kg), cost US$1795—just over half the cost of a computer from other manufacturers with comparable features—and ran the popular CP/M 2.2 operating system. It was designed to fit under an airline seat. At its peak, Osborne Computer Corporation shipped 10,000 units of "Osborne 1" per month. Osborne was one of the first personal computing pioneers to understand fully that there was a wide market of buyers who were not computing hobbyists: the Osborne 1 included word processing and spreadsheet software. This was at a time when IBM would not bundle hardware and software with their PCs, selling the operating systems, monitors, and even monitor cables separately.

Adam Osborne's experience in the computer industry gave his new company credibility. Osborne Computer Corporation advertisements compared Adam Osborne's influence on the personal computer market to Henry Ford's influence on transportation. It is said that in 1983, Osborne bragged about two advanced new computers his company was developing. These statements destroyed consumer demand for the Osborne 1, and the resulting inventory glut forced Osborne Computer to file for bankruptcy on 13 September 1983. This phenomenon, a pre-announcement of a new product causing a catastrophic collapse in demand for older ones, became known as the Osborne effect, but according to some new sources, the real reasons for Osborne Computer's bankruptcy were management errors and insufficient cash flow.

=== Hypergrowth ===
After Osborne Computer's collapse, Adam Osborne wrote a best-selling memoir of his experience, Hypergrowth: The Rise and Fall of the Osborne Computer Corporation, with John C. Dvorak, which was published in 1984.

== Software ==
In 1984, Osborne founded Paperback Software International Ltd., a company that specialized in inexpensive computer software. Its advertisements featured Osborne himself, arguing that if telephone companies applied the same logic to their pricing as software companies, a telephone would cost $600. One of its products was VP-Planner, an inexpensive clone of Lotus 1-2-3, which led to legal action when Lotus sued Paperback Software in 1987. As a result of the lawsuit, consumer confidence waned for Paperback Software, and its revenues had dropped 80% by 1989, preventing the firm from getting venture capital for expansion. In February 1990, the case went to court, and on 28 June, the court ruled that Paperback Software's product, by copying Lotus 1-2-3's look and feel menu interface, violated Lotus's copyright. Osborne stepped down from Paperback Software the same year. Paperback's database application, VP-Info continued to sell well for many more years, and acquired a second life as Sharkbase.

His final venture, in 1992, was to found the company Noetics Software, to work on artificial intelligence.

== Personal life and death ==
Osborne was a member of Mensa. He married – and divorced – twice: in the mid-1960s to Cynthia Geddes, an American, and later to Barbara Burdick (Zelnick). Osborne had three children. Both former wives and all his children survived him.

In 1992, Osborne returned to India in declining health, suffering from a brain disorder that triggered frequent minor strokes. He died in his sleep on 18 March 2003, in Kodaikanal, India, aged 64.

== Legacy ==
In 2026, the documentary film "Osborne: The Man Who Would Be King" by Anand Kamalakar was produced, covering Adam Osborne's life.
