= List of commercial failures in video and arcade games =

As a hit-driven business, the great majority of the video game industry's software releases have been commercial disappointments. In the early 21st century, industry commentators made these general estimates: 10% of published games generated 90% of revenue; that around 3% of PC games and 15% of console games have global sales of more than 100,000 units per year, with even this level insufficient to make high-budget games profitable; and that about 20% of games make any profit. Within years after Steam relaxed limits on which games could be digitally distributed on its service, they reported that around 80% of games failed to reach $5000 in revenue in their first two weeks of sales.

Some of these failure events have drastically changed the video game market since its origin in the late 1970s. For example, the failure of E.T. contributed to the video game crash of 1983. Some games, though commercial failures, are well received by certain groups of gamers and are considered cult games.

The following list includes any video game software on any platform where the commercial failure has been documented as such by the manufacture or published, or affirmed through industry sales trackers (in alphabetical order).

== Video game software failures ==
The following is an incomplete list of software that have been deemed commercial failures by industry sources.

=== Afro Samurai 2: Revenge of Kuma ===
Afro Samurai 2: Revenge of Kuma is a third-person action-adventure video game published by Versus Evil and developed by Redacted Studios. The game was released for PlayStation 4 via PlayStation Network and Windows in September 2015, with an Xbox One version planned for October. The sequel to 2009's Afro Samurai, originally a manga series by Takashi Okazaki, the player controls Kuma, a swordsman who seeks revenge on Afro.

The game received widely negative reviews from critics. Originally planned to be released in three volumes, Versus Evil pulled Revenge of Kuma from all platforms, issued refunds, and canceled the other two volumes. The Xbox One version was also never released, while the PlayStation 4 version is one of the few titles from that platform to not be backward compatible with the PlayStation 5.

Polygon called it one of the worst games of 2015. Giant Bomb called it the worst game of the year. It was the second worst-reviewed game of 2015 according to aggregate review website Metacritic. In November 2015, Afro Samurai 2 was pulled from the PSN and Steam. In an interview with CGMagazine on the game's withdrawal, Versus Evil's Steve Escalante called the game "a failure" and announced the cancellation of the other two volumes and refunds for customers. Escalante later expanded on the decision in an interview with Gamasutra, saying, "Given the game quality was not what people were expecting, it didn't sell like hot cakes, let's just put it like that."

=== Anthem ===
Anthem was an action role-playing game developed by BioWare and published by Electronic Arts in 2019. Its seven-year-long development period started after release of Mass Effect 3, and was envisioned by BioWare to move away from the typical role-playing formats of Mass Effect and Dragon Age, and become a type of live-service game. The game had a difficult development cycle due to shifting staff, technological difficulties in switching to the Frostbite Engine, and demands from EA's management on the direction of the game. Other BioWare projects from its other studios were put on hold to complete Anthem for release, and according to one BioWare developer, it was only the work of the last fifteen months of development that made it into the game. Due to this rush near the end of the development cycle, the game was considered to be lacking content at release, contained numerous software bugs that plagued gameplay, and was found too similar to other live-service games like Destiny and World of Warcraft. BioWare and EA had stated their intent to revamp the game to meet expectations, but the game struggled to maintain a playbase. Though the game ultimately sold over 5 million copies in its lifetime, EA had anticipated sales to be much higher and comparable to the Battlefield series, and in 2021, EA opted to terminate further development work on Anthem, with the game's servers closed on January 12, 2026.

=== APB: All Points Bulletin ===
APB: All Points Bulletin was a multiplayer online game developed by Realtime Worlds in 2010. The game, incorporating concepts from their previous game Crackdown and past work by its lead developer David Jones, who had helped create the Grand Theft Auto series, was set around the idea of a large-scale urban battle between Enforcers and Criminals; players would be able to partake in large-scale on-going missions between the two sides. The game was originally set as both a Microsoft Windows and Xbox 360 title and as Realtime Worlds' flagship title for release in 2008, but instead the company set about developing Crackdown first, and later focused APB as a Windows-only title, potentially porting the game to the Xbox 360 later. Upon launch in June 2010, the game received lukewarm reviews, hampered by the existence of a week-long review embargo, and did not attract the expected number of subscribers to maintain its business model. Realtime Worlds, suffering from the commercial failure of the game, sold off a second project, Project MyWorld, and subsequently reduced its operations to administration and a skeleton crew to manage the APB servers while they attempted to find a buyer, including possibly Epic Games who had expressed interest in the title. However, without any acceptable offers, the company was forced to shut down APB in September 2010. Eventually, the game was sold to K2 Network, a company that has brought other Asian massive-multiplayer online games to the Western markets as free-to-play titles, and similar changes occurred to APB when it was relaunched by K2.

=== Artifact ===
Artifact is a 2018 digital collectible card game (CCG), designed by Richard Garfield, the creator of Magic: The Gathering, and developed by Valve Corporation. It was designed as a spinoff from Dota 2, and while playing out encounters with cards worked similar to other CCGs like Hearthstone, the game used the concept of multiple lanes from Dota 2, with three different playfields involved at all times. Instead of a free to play model, Artifact was released at a premium cost, and encouraged players to buy new booster packs and trade and sell individual cards on the Steam Marketplace. Valve envisioned Artifact to draw competitive players and lead to esports tournaments. At launch, the game was found to be overly complex and relied too much on random number generation mechanics in gameplay, and the monetization approach was considered as "pay to win", requiring players to invest in new cards as to be able to compete. Within half a year from release, its player base has significantly dropped; some users on Twitch began using channels labeled for Artifact to stream inappropriate content on the basis of such streams having low viewerships by that point, forcing Twitch to take moderation actions. Valve stated in around this time that they were planned to reevaluate and redesign the game to meet complaints from players. Artifact 2.0 was put into beta testing in March 2020, with one of the largest changes being the removal of the monetization options for obtaining cards. By March 2021, Valve decided to end development of Artifact, and released two free versions of the game in its current state, Artifact Classic, which incorporated the gameplay of the original release, and Artifact Foundry, which included the changes envisioned for the v2.0 release. Both versions completely removed monetization options. Valve's CEO Gabe Newell called Artifact a "giant disappointment" though considered its failure a learning experience.

=== Babylon's Fall ===
Babylon's Fall was an online action role-playing game developed by PlatinumGames and published by Square Enix for the PlayStation 4, PlayStation 5 and PC. The game was PlatinumGames' first attempt at a live service game, and was described as an attempt to combine the combat system featured on Nier: Automata with multiplayer, although the game could also be played solo. Originally teased at E3 2018, Babylon's Fall would suffer a multitude of delays away from its initial planned 2019 release date, with the game being further delayed by the COVID-19 pandemic.

Upon its eventual release on March 3, 2022, Babylon's Fall was met with little fanfare and received generally negative reviews from critics and players, many who criticised the game's lackluster mechanics and combat, with several critics calling the game overpriced. The concurrent player count for Babylon's Fall only peaked at 1,179 on release day, and player numbers declined rapidly afterwards; by April 13, 2022, it was reported that the game's player count had fallen to below 10 concurrent players, and on May 4, 2022, the player count reportedly dropped to a single player. On September 13, 2022, Square Enix announced that they would be ending support for Babylon's Fall on February 27, 2023, and suspended digital sales of the game and in-game currency, despite initially promising that they were intending to support the game in the long-term. Babylon's Fall's commercial failure was described by Forbes as "one of the biggest mainstream misses we’ve seen in recent memories", with TechRadar also naming the game "[Square Enix]'s biggest disaster of the year". Despite this, PlatinumGames CEO Atsushi Inaba later said that the failure of Babylon's Fall did not affect any of the company's plans to continue expanding into live service games, and also attributed some of Babylon's Fall's faults to the separate developments of the core game and the live service elements between PlatinumGames and Square Enix, respectively.

=== Battlecruiser 3000AD ===
One of the most notorious PC video game failures, Battlecruiser 3000AD (shortened BC3K) was hyped for almost a decade before its disastrous release in the U.S. and Europe. The game was the brainchild of Derek Smart, an independent game developer renowned for lengthy and aggressive online responses to perceived criticism. The concept behind BC3K was ambitious, giving the player the command of a large starship with all the requisite duties, including navigation, combat, resource management, and commanding crew members. Advertisements appeared in the video game press in the mid-1990s hyping the game as, "The Last Thing You'll Ever Desire." Computer bulletin boards and Usenet groups were abuzz with discussion about the game. As time wore on and numerous delays were announced, excitement turned to frustration in the online community. Smart exacerbated the negative air by posting liberally on Usenet. The posts ignited one of the largest flame wars in Usenet history. During the development cycle, Smart refused to let other programmers have full access to his code and continued to change directions as new technology became available, causing the game to be in development for over seven years.

In November 1996, Take-Two Interactive finally released the game, reportedly over protests from Smart. The game was buggy and only partially finished, with outdated graphics, MIDI music, a cryptic interface, and almost no documentation. Critics and the video game community reacted poorly to the release. Eventually, a stable, playable version of the game was released as Battlecruiser 3000AD v2.0. Smart eventually released BC3K as freeware and went on to create several sequels under the Battlecruiser and Universal Combat titles.

=== Beyond Good & Evil ===
Although critically acclaimed and planned as the first part of a trilogy, Beyond Good & Evil (released in 2003) flopped commercially. Former Ubisoft employee Owen Hughes stated that sales were harmed by the publisher's simultaneous releases of Tom Clancy's Splinter Cell, Prince of Persia: The Sands of Time, and, in Europe, XIII; all were based on well-established brands that eclipsed the new IP Beyond Good & Evil. The game's commercial failure led Ubisoft to postpone plans for follow-up titles. A sequel was announced at the end of the Ubidays 2008 opening conference, and an HD version of the original was released for the Xbox 360 and PlayStation 3 via download in 2011. Alain Corre, Ubisoft's Executive Director of EMEA Territories, commented that the Xbox 360 release "did extremely well", but considered this success "too late" to make a difference in the game's poor sales. Beyond Good & Evil 2, retooled as a prequel, was announced at Ubisoft's press conference at E3 2017, fourteen years after the release of the original game. As of 2026, it remains in development with no release date or target platform announced.

=== Brütal Legend ===
Brütal Legend is Double Fine Productions' second major game. The game is set in a world based on heavy metal music, includes a hundred-song soundtrack across numerous metal subgenres, and incorporates a celebrity voice cast including Jack Black, Lemmy Kilmister, Rob Halford, Ozzy Osbourne, Lita Ford, and Tim Curry. The game was originally to be published by Vivendi Games via Sierra Entertainment prior to its merger with Activision. Following the merger, Activision declined to publish Brütal Legend, and Double Fine turned to Electronic Arts as their publishing partner, delaying the game's release. Activision and Double Fine counter-sued each other for breach of contract, ultimately settling out of court. The game was designed as an action adventure/real-time strategy game similar to Herzog Zwei; as games in the real-time strategy genre generally do not perform well on consoles, Double Fine was told by both Vivendi and Electronic Arts to avoid stating this fact and emphasize other elements of the game. With some positive reviews from critics, the game got criticized for its real-time strategy elements that were not mentioned within the pre-release marketing, making it a difficult game to sell to players. Furthermore, its late-year release in October 2009 buried the title among many top-tier games, including Uncharted 2: Among Thieves, Batman: Arkham Asylum and Call of Duty: Modern Warfare 2. It only sold about 215,000 units within the first month, making it a "retail failure", and though Double Fine had begun work on a sequel, Electronic Arts cancelled further development. According to Tim Schafer, president and lead developer of Double Fine, 1.4 million copies of the game had been sold by February 2011.

=== Concord ===
Concord was a hero shooter game developed by Firewalk Studios and released for the PlayStation 5 and Windows in August 2024. The game was reported to have eight years of development work, estimated to have cost at least US$200 million to develop and was further funded when Firewalk was acquired by Sony Interactive Entertainment in 2023, where it was purportedly called "the future of PlayStation". The game was to be a live service title, supported by cosmetic microtransactions, but also was shipped as a premium title rather than free-to-play. Initial critical impressions of the game considered that it had lackluster character designs and offered few innovations on existing online shooters already on the market. At launch, the game saw fewer than 700 concurrent players through Steam and around 1,300 on PlayStation, and estimates of sales based on player counts were fewer than 25,000, according to Simon Carless. Carless cited the lack of marketing, the high price point for a live service game, and the saturation of hero shooters already on the market as reasons for the poor sales. With the poor sales during the first two weeks of release, Firewalk announced they would pull the game from sale, offer full refunds to all buyers, terminate the servers on September 6, 2024, and then would determine what direction to take the game, while offline. Sony closed Firewalk in October 2024, and permanently shut down Concord. Sony's COO/CFO Hiroki Totoki said in an investor call following the closure of Concord that "with regards to new IP, of course, you don’t know the result until you actually try it", and that "we probably need to have a lot of gates, including user testing or internal evaluation, and the timing of such gates. And then we need to bring them forward, and we should have done those gates much earlier than we did."

=== Conker's Bad Fur Day ===
Conker's Bad Fur Day is a 3D platformer by Rare for the Nintendo 64. In it, the player controls Conker, a greedy, hard-drinking squirrel, through levels. While it is visually similar to Rare's previous games like Banjo-Kazooie and Donkey Kong 64, Conker's Bad Fur Day is aimed at mature audiences and features profanity, graphic violence, and off-color humor. The game was originally designed to be family-friendly, but was retooled after prerelease versions of the game were criticized for their similarities to Rare's previous games. Though receiving critical acclaim, Conker's Bad Fur Day performed well below expectations, with only 55,000 copies sold by April 2001. Numerous reasons have been cited for the game's perceived failure to connect with audiences, such as its high cost, advertisements exclusive to the older audience, and its release towards the end of the Nintendo 64's life cycle. Nintendo, which held a minority stake in Rare at the time, also did not actively promote the game. After Microsoft bought out Rare, it remade the game on the Xbox as Conker: Live and Reloaded which included an online multiplayer component based on part of the original game.

=== Daikatana ===
One of the more infamous failures in PC video games was Daikatana, which was drastically hyped due to creator John Romero's popular status as one of the key designers behind Doom. However, after being wrought with massive over-spending and serious delays, the game finally launched to poor critical reaction because of bugs, lackluster enemies, poor gameplay and production values, all of which were made worse by its heavy marketing campaign proclaiming it as the next "big thing" in first person shooters.

=== Dragon Age: The Veilguard ===
Dragon Age: The Veilguard was the fourth main game in the Dragon Age series by BioWare and published by Electronic Arts. It was released in 2024, and received "generally favorable" reviews across its release platforms. The game had a long development period that had started in 2015, and during development had two major shifts in leadership at the studio, leading to design changes that longtime fans of the series did not like such as elements of live service games. Further, the game's was criticized by a minority of players that considered it "woke" for including a non-binary companion. Initial sales had appeared promising, but by mid 2025, EA had found sales lagging, with EA CEO Andrew Wilson saying they may have to think about how their approach to single-player games and inclusion of live service elements. The game missed its sales target by 50%, according to Jason Schreier of Bloomberg News. While not the sole reason, its poor sales, coupled with poor performance of BioWare's earlier Mass Effect: Andromeda and Anthem, and the high cost of the planned game in the Mass Effect series, led EA to close the studio in October 2026, following the acquisition of EA by the Saudi Arabia Public Investment Fund.

=== Dominion: Storm Over Gift 3 ===
The first title released by Ion Storm, Dominion is a real time strategy title similar to Command & Conquer and Warcraft, based as a spin-off to the G-Nome canon. The game was originally developed by 7th Level, but was purchased by Ion Storm for US$1.8 million. The project originally had a budget of US$50,000 and was scheduled to be finished in three months with two staff members. Due to mismanagement and Ion Storm's inexperience, the project took over a year, costing hundreds of thousands of dollars. Dominion was released in July 1998. It received bad reviews and sold poorly, falling far short of recouping its purchase price, let alone the cost of finishing it. The game divided employees working on Ion's marquee title, Daikatana, arguably leading to the walkout of several key development team members. It put a strain on Ion Storm's finances, leading the once well-funded startup to scramble for cash as Daikatana's development extended over several years.

=== Epic Mickey 2: The Power of Two ===
A sequel to the successful Wii-exclusive platformer Epic Mickey, Epic Mickey 2: The Power of Two was developed in 2012 by Junction Point Studios and published by Disney Interactive Studios for the Wii, Wii U, Xbox 360, PlayStation 3, PlayStation Vita, and Microsoft Windows. Though heavily advertised and being released on multiple consoles, only 270,000 copies of Epic Mickey 2 were sold in North America, barely a quarter of the original's sales of 1.3 million. The game's failure led to the shutdown of Junction Point and the cancellation of future entries in the Epic Mickey series.

=== E.T. the Extra-Terrestrial ===
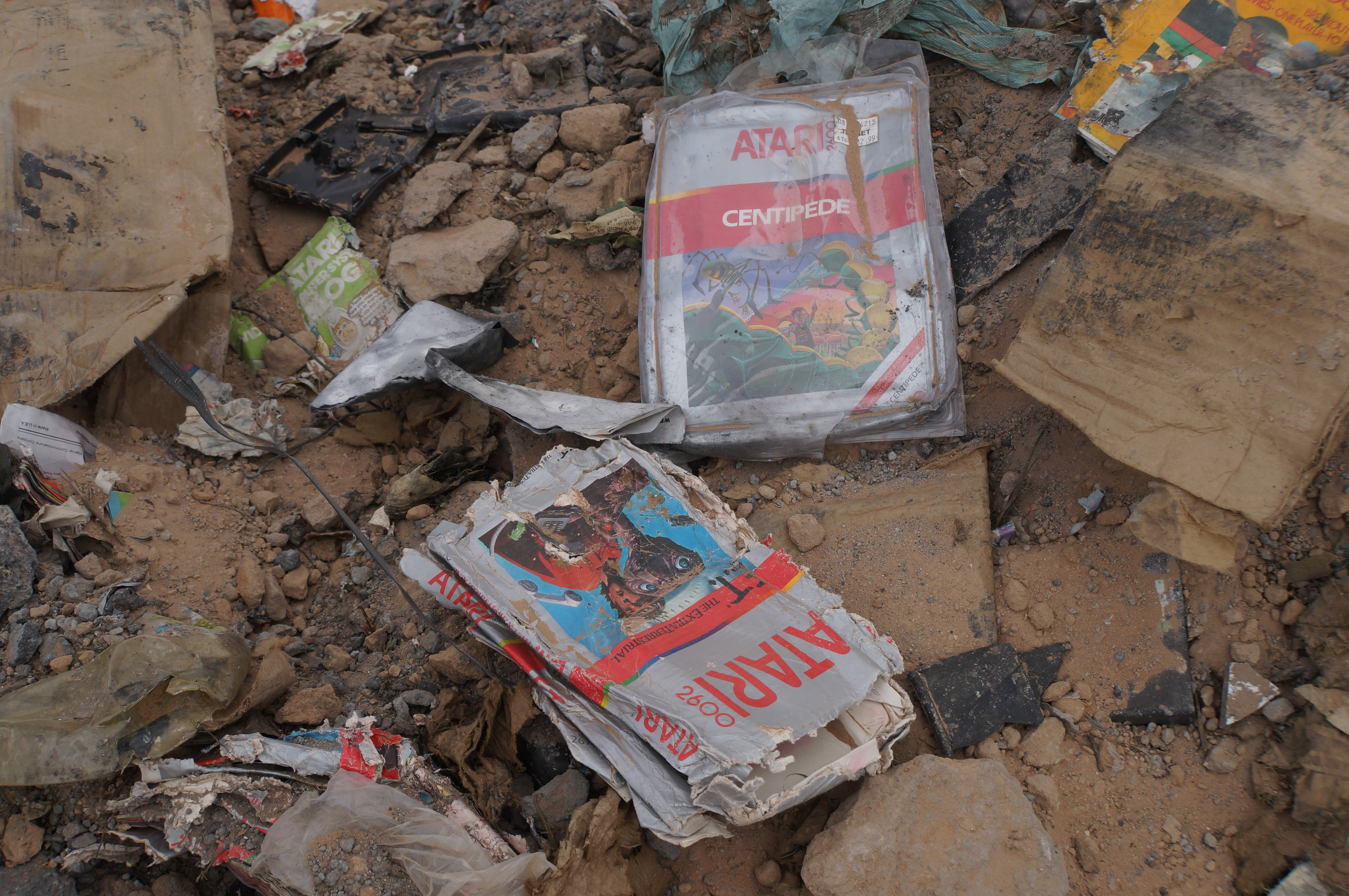
Excavated copies of E.T., Centipede, and other Atari games from the burial site in New Mexico

Based on Steven Spielberg's popular 1982 movie of the same name and reportedly coded in just five weeks, this Atari 2600 game was rushed to the market for the 1982 holiday season.

Even with 1.5 million copies sold, the sales figures came nowhere near Atari's expectations, as it had ordered production of five million copies, with many of the sold games being returned to Atari for refunds by dissatisfied consumers. It had become an urban legend that Atari had buried the unsold cartridges of E.T. and other games in a landfill in Alamogordo, New Mexico, which was confirmed in 2014 when the site was allowed to be excavated, with former Atari personnel affirming they had dumped about 800,000 cartridges, including E.T. and other poorly-selling games. The financial figures and business tactics surrounding this product are emblematic of the video game crash of 1983 and contributed to Atari's bankruptcy. Atari paid $25 million for the license to produce the game, which further contributed to a debt of $536 million (equivalent to $1.79 billion today). The company was divided and sold in 1984.

=== Funko Fusion ===
Funko Fusion is a 2024 action-adventure game developed and published by 10:10 Games, based on the Funko Pop! line of collectible figurines and featuring characters from franchises including those of Universal Pictures, as well as Mega Man and Five Nights at Freddy's. The game received mixed reviews, and 10:10 Games later confirmed that Funko Fusion failed commercially, leading to layoffs at the studio.

=== Grim Fandango ===
Known for being the first adventure game by LucasArts to use three-dimensional graphics, Grim Fandango received positive reviews and won numerous awards. It was originally thought that the game sold well during the 1998 holiday season. However, the game's sales appeared to be crowded out by other titles released during the late 1998 season, including Half-Life, Metal Gear Solid and The Legend of Zelda: Ocarina of Time. Based on data provided by PC Data (now owned by NPD Group), the game sold about 95,000 copies up to 2003 in North America, excluding online sales. Worldwide sales are estimated between 100,000 and 500,000 units by 2012. Developer Tim Schafer along with others of the Grim Fandango development team would leave LucasArts after this project to begin a new studio (Double Fine Productions). Grim Fandango's relatively modest sales are often cited as a contributing factor to the decline of the adventure game genre in the late 1990s, though the title's reputation as a "flop" is to an extent a case of perception over reality, as Schafer has pointed out that the game turned a profit, with the royalty check he eventually received being proof. His perspective is that the adventure genre did not so much lose its audience as fail to grow it while production costs continued to rise. This made adventure games less attractive investment for publishers; in contrast, the success of first-person shooters caused the console market to boom. The emergence of new distribution channels which did not rely on the traditional retail model would ultimately re-empower the niche genre. Double Fine has since remastered the game for high definition graphics and re-released it through these channels.

=== Highguard ===
Highguard was a free-to-play multiplayer game developed by Wildlight Entertainment, a studio founded by former Respawn Entertainment employees in 2021 with funding from Tencent. They had left Respawn over disagreements with how profits from Apex Legends had been shared with employees, and intended to establish a better profit-sharing mechanism under Wildlight. They started developing a multiplayer survival game based on Rust, but after about two years of work, found their ideas too complex, and refocused some of the ideas, including raid-like mechanics, into Highguard by January 2024, with plans to release as a live-service game in early 2026 and expanding over time. Playtesting was mostly done internally along with Tencent's TiMi Studio Group, revealing that while players had enjoyed the game once they learned the mechanics, the learning curve was difficult. The developers suggested taking routes used by Arc Raiders and Battlefield 6, establishing a community for the game in the months before release to garner interest and get initial feedback, but the studio management refused. Instead, the game was announced during The Game Awards 2025 show on December 11, 2025, selected as the final reveal trailer of the show by Geoff Keighley, who had tried the game and enjoyed it. Between the awards show and the game's release on January 26, 2026, there was nearly no promotion of the game. Once released, the game criticized for its high complexity particularly for those playing without in-game chat features. The initial player counts were high, but lost 90% of the player count in a week, which impacted plans to maintain the game through microtransactions. The studio was unable to bring players back with updated features, and a month later, Tencent pulled funding from the studio, leaving only 20 staff by the end of February. The decision was made to shut down the game by March 12, 2026.

=== Homefront ===
Homefront is a 2011 video game developed by Kaos Studios and published by THQ in 2011. Kaos was formed out of former members of Trauma Studios, a studio made up of Battlefield 1942 game modders that were brought into Digital Illusions CE to contribute towards Battlefield 2. Digital Illusions shuttered Trauma in 2005 shortly before the release of Battlefield 2. THQ wanted to compete with larger publishers with their major military-based first-person shooters, and recruited the core Trauma team as Kaos as a new studio in New York City. Kaos' first game Frontlines: Fuel of War, released in 2008, was met with mixed reviews. By this time, Activision's Call of Duty had become a juggernaut in the video game industry, and THQ established a pillar of their strategy to release a competitor in this genre, bringing executive vice president Danny Bilson, a former Hollywood scriptwriter, to lead his effort. THQ gave Kaos a large budget, estimated to be tens of millions of dollars over three years, and major expectations for Homefront, a shooter based an attack on the U.S. by a foreign invader. Kaos was expanded with more senior programmers who previously worked at EA Los Angeles on Medal of Honor, and with the pressure to develop a competing game and frequent oversight by Bilson into the game's progression along with mandatory crunch time, Kaos suffered from high staff turnover, including multiple general managers across the game's development. Former Kaos members also claimed there was an inconsistent vision for the game, with Bilson offering several ideas, such as using North Korean forces as the invading forces and making its gameplay a copycat of Call of Duty even though the studio was out of its league to make such a game. He also tried to force too many film concepts into the game. The game was given a highly-ambitious marketing campaign that doubled its budget to roughly $100 million. The game's subject matter and marketing campaign drew negative word of mouth, which hurt the morale of the already-exhausted Kaos employees. Near release, THQ told the studio that its future would depend on how well the game sold and its critical reception. Once Homefront launched in March 2011 it received middling reviews because of lackluster writing, bugs, dull graphics, lackluster enemies, poor gameplay and production values, all of which were made worse by its heavy marketing campaign proclaiming it as a serious competitor to Call of Duty. It also drew backlash for its use of the extremely racist Yellow Peril canard. The game's mediocre reception subsequently caused THQ to suffer a drop in stock prices. Even though Homefront sold 2.6 million copies shortly after launch and was called the most pre-ordered game by THQ, the game underperformed commercially. THQ closed Kaos a few months after release, bringing on Crytek UK to develop the sequel.

=== Jazz Jackrabbit 2 ===
Although reviews for Jazz Jackrabbit 2 were positive, sales were insufficient and resulted in a loss for its publisher Gathering of Developers. This prevented the developers from finding a publisher for Jazz Jackrabbit 3, thus leading to its cancellation.

=== King of Meat ===
King of Meat was a 2025 party game developed by Glowmade Games and published by Amazon Game Studios. Senior management expected a player count at 100,000 or more, but SteamDB's charts showed the player count peaked at 320 and declined further, with a free weekend not helping much. Many developers at Glowmade were laid off as a result, and the game was shut down on April 9, 2026.

=== Kingdoms of Amalur: Reckoning ===
Kingdoms of Amalur: Reckoning is an action RPG game released in 2012, developed by 38 Studios and Big Huge Games. 38 Studios had been formed by Curt Schilling initially in Massachusetts. After acquiring Big Huge Games from the failing THQ, the studio secured a US$75 million loan guarantee from the economic development board of Rhode Island for establishing 38 Studios within the state and promoting job growth. Kingdoms was generally well received by critics, and initial sales within the first three months were around 1.3 million. Though impressive, Rhode Island recognized that the title was expected to have hit 3 million units by this point for 38 Studios to pay back the loan. 38 Studios defaulted on one of the loan repayments, leading to a publisher to pull out of a US$35 million investment in a sequel. The studio managed to make the next payment, but could not make payroll or other expenses, and shortly later declared bankruptcy by May 2012. Resolving the unpaid loan became a civil lawsuit, and ultimately with the state settling with Schilling and other investors for a US$61 million payment, leaving the state around US$28 million short on its loan. The rights to Kingdoms eventually fell to THQ Nordic AB, the holding company that came to acquire many of the former THQ properties after their bankruptcy.

=== The Lamplighters League ===
The Lamplighters League is a turn-based tactics game developed by Harebrained Schemes and published by Paradox Interactive (the parent company of Harebrained Schemes) in 2023. The game was based on adventures published in pulp magazines of the 1930s. While the game received positive reviews, it failed to achieve a commercial success. A week after its release, Paradox stated that they intended to write off the game at a cost of 248 million kr (US$22 million). This followed after Paradox had laid off 80% of Harebrained Schemes' employees. Harebrained Schemes, which had been bought by Paradox in 2018, announced that they agreed to end their partnership with Paradox, and reorganized as an independent company.

=== The Last Express ===
Released in 1997 after five years in development, this $6 million adventure game was the brainchild of Jordan Mechner, the creator of Prince of Persia. The game was noted for taking place in almost complete real-time, using Art Nouveau-style characters that were rotoscoped from a 22-day live-action video shoot, and featuring intelligent writing and levels of character depth that were not often seen in computer games. Even with rave reviews, Broderbund, the game's publisher, did little to promote the game, apart from a brief mention in a press release and enthusiastic statements by Broderbund executives, in part due to the entire Broderbund marketing team quitting in the weeks before its release. Released in April, the game was not a success, selling only about 100,000 copies, a million copies short of breaking even.

After the release of the game, Mechner's company Smoking Car Productions quietly folded, and Brøderbund was acquired by The Learning Company, who were only interested in Broderbund's educational software, effectively putting the game out of print which also caused the PlayStation port to be cancelled after almost being finished for a 1998 release. Mechner was later able to reacquire the rights to the game, and in 2012, worked with DotEmu to release an iOS port of the title, before making it to Android as well.

=== MadWorld ===
MadWorld is a beat 'em up title for the Wii developed by PlatinumGames and distributed by Sega in March 2009. The game was purposely designed as an extremely violent video game. The game features a distinctive black-and-white graphic style that borrows from both Frank Miller's Sin City and other Japanese and Western comics. This monotone coloring is only broken by blood that comes from attacking and killing foes in numerous, gruesome, and over-the-top manners. Though there had been violent games available for the Wii from the day it was launched (e.g. No More Heroes and Manhunt 2), many perceived MadWorld as one of the first mature titles for the system, causing some initial outrage from concerned consumers about the normally family-friendly system. MadWorld was well received by critics, but this did not translate into commercial sales; only 123,000 units of the game sold in the United States during its first six months on the market. Sega considered these sales to be "disappointing". Regardless, the game's critical success allowed a successor, Anarchy Reigns (2012), to be produced.

=== Marathon (2026) ===
Bungie's 2026 Marathon was developed as a refresh of its original Marathon trilogy from 1994 to 1996. Rather than a first-person shooter, Bungie developed the new Marathon as a player-versus-player-versus-environment extraction shooter. At this point, Bungie had been acquired by Sony Interactive Entertainment in 2022 at a value of $3.6 billion, much of the developer's value being the continuing success of Destiny 2 and with the intent to have Bungie help build out more live service games at Sony. Bungie over-extended itself over the next few years, having planned on several additional games in addition to Destiny 2 and Marathon, and starting in 2023 had to scale back plans to keep its focus on these flagship titles in addition to layoffs and delaying major content updated for Destiny 2. Later in 2024, Sony had released the live-service game Concord but pulled it from availability after failing a playbase, leaving Sony with very few major titles in its upcoming catalog. After showing previews and closed test sessions of Marathon's gameplay in early 2025 with lukewarm reception from gamers, Bungie opted to delay Marathon into 2026 to better refine the title as to avoid the mistakes with Concord. Delays in Marathon's release and in Destiny 2 content alongside significant changes in its gameplay structure with Destiny 2: The Edge of Fate that were in part due to the heavier focus on Marathon's release caused monetization targets to be missed, and Sony assigned a $200 million impairment loss from its acquisiton of Bungie in November 2025. Marathon ultimately released in March 2026 to generally positive critical reception, but Sony increased the total impairment loss for Bungie to $765 million by the end of its fiscal year (ending March 31, 2026). Bungie opted to terminate all further development on Destiny 2, leaving the game in a playable state and laying off most of the Destiny 2 development team to solely focus on Marathon by June 2026. Marathon still struggled to draw a large player base, and in a message in September 2026, Bungie admitted the game failed to draw the expected numbers because as a pure extraction shooter, it was deemed too hard. To that end, Bungie put an indefinite pause on the seasonal structure of Marathon to try to develop modes that would be more welcoming to players alongside the extraction shooter elements. Bungie also admitted that they needed to revisit Destiny 2 to build a better foundation for any possible future Destiny game, and announced plans to revert the content "vaulting" that they had done around 2022.

=== Mario & Luigi: Bowser's Inside Story + Bowser Jr.'s Journey ===
After the success of Mario & Luigi: Superstar Saga + Bowser's Minions, a remake of the first game in the Mario & Luigi series in 2017, Nintendo announced a remake of Mario & Luigi: Bowser's Inside Story in March 2018 in a similar vein of the previous remake with improved visuals, a remastered soundtrack, and an additional story in Bowser Jr.'s Journey. Upon release in January 2019, the game was a critical success though it got slightly worse reviews than the original. However, the game was a commercial failure, selling under 9,500 copies in its first week in Japan. Famitsu reported that the game had a lifetime total of 34,523 copies, making it one of the worst-selling Mario games since the Virtual Boy. The game's failure was attributed to being one of the last games on the Nintendo 3DS, with the Nintendo Switch having already been out for nearly two years. The game has also been credited with resulting in the bankruptcy of series developer AlphaDream. The next installment, Mario & Luigi: Brothership, was released in 2024, with some former AlphaDream employees having worked on the title.

=== Marvel's Avengers ===
Published by Square Enix and developed by Crystal Dynamics, the action-adventure game failed to sustain its player base as a live-service title. Despite strong initial sales and a high-profile intellectual property, the game was criticized for a repetitive endgame loop, technical bugs, and a lack of compelling content updates. Square Enix later revealed that the game's initial sales had failed to recover its high development costs, contributing to a $63 million loss for the company's digital entertainment segment in that quarter. Support officially ended in September 2023, and the game was delisted from digital storefronts.

=== Marvel vs. Capcom: Infinite ===
Marvel vs. Capcom: Infinite is the sixth main installment in Capcom's Marvel vs. Capcom series of fighting games that pits Capcom and Marvel's famous characters against each other. When the game was shown at E3 2017, some of the character designs were poorly received, particularly Chun-Li from Street Fighter and Dante from Devil May Cry. The game was also criticized for its lack of X-Men or Fantastic Four characters. Capcom projected that the game would sell two million units by December 31, 2017, but the game launched with a poor showing thanks to the game having a low budget, which would cause Marvel vs. Capcom: Infinite to generate only half of the projected amount that Capcom gave. Marvel vs. Capcom: Infinite's failing would lead to cancellation of DLC, and its exclusion from tournaments such as Evo 2018, as well as Capcom being quiet surrounding the title. The title's failure was also in part due to the competition it received from Bandai Namco's Dragon Ball FighterZ which along with its massive name recognition, took influence from Infinite's two predecessors, Marvel vs. Capcom 2: New Age of Heroes and Ultimate Marvel vs. Capcom 3.

=== MultiVersus ===
MultiVersus was a free-to-play crossover platform fighting game featuring various Warner Bros. characters. The game was developed by Player First Games and published by Warner Bros. Games for PlayStation 4, PlayStation 5, Windows, Xbox One and Xbox Series X/S.

It was first released in early access and open beta versions from July 2022 to June 2023. The game was fully released in May 2024, prior to Warner Bros. Games' acquisition of Player First Games. In November 2024, the studio announced that MultiVersus underperformed commercially, leading to parent company Warner Bros. Discovery taking a $100 million impairment charge. The game was delisted and all online functionality was discontinued in May 2025. The game's failure led to the closure of Player First Games in February 2025 and also partially led to a restructuring of Warner Bros. Games to focus on four core properties: the DC Universe, Harry Potter, Game of Thrones, and Mortal Kombat.

=== Ōkami ===
Ōkami was a product of Clover Studio with direction by Hideki Kamiya, previously known for his work on the Resident Evil and Devil May Cry series. The game is favorably compared to a Zelda-type adventure, and is based on the quest of the goddess-wolf Amaterasu using a "celestial brush" to draw in magical effects on screen and to restore the cursed land of ancient Nippon. Released first in 2006 on the PlayStation 2, it later received a port to the Wii system, where the brush controls were reworked for the motion controls of the Wii Remote. The game was well received by critics, with Metacritic aggregate scores of 93% and 90% for the PlayStation 2 and Wii versions, respectively, and was considered one of the best titles for 2006; IGN named it their Game of the Year. Though strongly praised by critics, fewer than 600,000 units were sold by March 2009. These factors have led for Ōkami to be called the "least commercially successful winner of a game of the year award" in the 2010 version of the Guinness World Records Gamer's Edition. Shortly after its release, Capcom disbanded Clover Studio, though many of its employees, including Kamiya, went on to form PlatinumGames and produce MadWorld and the more successful Bayonetta. Strong fan support of the game led to a spiritual successor, Ōkamiden (2010), on the Nintendo DS, followed by a high-definition remaster of Ōkami for the PlayStation 3, PlayStation 4, Xbox One, Nintendo Switch and Microsoft Windows released during the mid-to-late 2010s.

Kamiya had expressed interest in a sequel to Ōkami since moving to PlatinumGames, stating he had been in talks with Capcom on the idea. He left PlatinumGames in mid-2023, at the time stating he was going independent. A sequel was announced at The Game Awards 2024 in December 2024, with development being led by Kamiya at a new studio called Clovers that included several former members of Clover Studio.

=== The Osu! Tatakae! Ouendan series ===
After developing the rhythm game Gitaroo Man, iNiS Corporation began work on a more innovative one for the Nintendo DS which was based on an idea from founder Keiichi Yano, in which players would tap and drag on-screen targets in time with music to help an oendan cheer up people who are in trouble so that they can overcome their problems, which Nintendo released as Osu! Tatakae! Ouendan. The game received positive reviews, leading to plans to develop a localized and upgraded reskin of the game titled Elite Beat Agents, as well as a sequel, Moero! Nekketsu Rhythm Damashii Osu! Tatakae! Ouendan 2. Despite all three games being praised by critics, none of them were commercially successful, all selling fewer than a million copies each. Poor sales, as well as the uniqueness of their target platform, prevented Nintendo from considering further sequels.

=== Overkill's The Walking Dead ===
Starbreeze Studios had acquired a license in 2014 to develop a game set in The Walking Dead franchise from Skybound Entertainment, using the cooperative gameplay mechanics from Payday: The Heist developed by Starbreeze's subsidiary Overkill Software. The game fell into development hell namely due to demands from Starbreeze to switch game engines, first from the internally-developed Diesel Engine which had been used on the Payday games to the newly developed Valhalla Engine, which Starbreeze had acquired at a large cost, and later to the Unreal Engine after the Valhalla proved too difficult to work with. Having slipped its major release dates twice, the game was completed by November 2018, but which the developers felt was under extreme rush and without sufficient quality review and testing. Overkill's The Walking Dead had mediocre reviews on release to Microsoft Windows, and only 100,000 units were sold within the month. Starbreeze had placed a significant amount of sales expectations behind the game, and with poor sales, the company placed plans to release the game on consoles on hold, and in December 2018 announced that it was restructuring due to a lack of liquidatable assets from the underperformance of Overkill's The Walking Dead. In Starbreeze's financial report for the quarter ending December 31, 2018, which included Overkill's The Walking Dead' release, the game brought in only about 34.1 million kr (about US$3.7 million), while Payday 2, a title released in 2013, made 20.4 million kr in the same quarter. By the end of February 2019, Skybound pulled its licensing agreement from Starbreeze as "ultimately 'Overkill's The Walking Dead' did not meet our standards nor is it the quality that we were promised". Starbreeze officially halted further development of the Windows version and cancelled the game's planned console ports, while Skybound later cancelled the game entirely and pulled the license from Starbreeze. The poor returns on OTWD led Starbreeze to undergo a corporate restructuring from December 2018 to December 2019, laying off staff, selling off publishing and intellectual property rights, and reimplemented paid downloadable content for Payday 2, reneging on an early promise that all such future content would be free.

=== Psychonauts ===
Though achieving notable critical success, including GameSpot's 2005 Best Game No One Played award, Psychonauts sold fewer than 100,000 copies during its initial release. The game led to troubles at publisher Majesco, including the resignation of its CEO and the plummeting of the company's stock, prompting a class-action lawsuit by the company's stockholders. At the time of its release in 2005, the game was considered the "poster child" for failures in innovative games. Its poor sales have also been blamed on a lack of marketing. However, today the game remains a popular title on various digital download services. The creator of Psychonauts, Tim Schafer, has a cult following due to his unique and eccentric style. Eventually, Double Fine would go on to acquire the full rights to publishing the game, and, with funding from Dracogen, created a Mac OS X and Linux port of the game, which was sold as part of a Humble Bundle in 2012 with nearly 600,000 bundles sold; according to Schafer, "We made more on Psychonauts [in 2012] than we ever have before." In August 2015, Steam Spy estimated approximately 1,157,000 owners of the game on the digital distributor Steam. Psychonauts was re-released in 2019 for the PlayStation 4 as a Standard Edition and a Collector's Edition, both region free, by publishing company Limited Run Games. A sequel, Psychonauts 2, was partially crowdfunded prior to Double Fine's acquisition by Microsoft who provided additional funding support, and was released in August 2021. The sequel went on to become Double Fine's best selling game, with at least 1.7 million copies sold by April 1, 2022.

=== Puyo Puyo Chronicle ===
Puyo Puyo Chronicle is a 2016 puzzle video game developed and published by Sega for the Nintendo 3DS. Released in Japan, it was intended to celebrate the 25th anniversary of Puyo Puyo, similar to titles like Puyo Puyo! 15th Anniversary and Puyo Puyo!! 20th Anniversary. The main game is an RPG that takes place in a storybook world, where the player progresses though the story by battling enemies and other characters in Puyo Puyo. While critics praised the change to 3D art style and multiplayer modes, the RPG mode was criticized for being repetitive and tedious. Puyo Puyo Chronicle sold less than 22,000 copies in its lifetime, and series producer Mizuki Hosoyamada confirmed that the game had poor sales in a 2021 interview with Red Bull. This was the last dedicated Puyo Puyo game to coincide with an anniversary, with the series' 30th anniversary instead being commemorated with Super Puyo Quest Project, a large update to Puyopuyo!! Quest that changed major parts of the game; and content updates to Puyo Puyo Tetris 2.

=== Shenmue and Shenmue II ===
Shenmue on the Dreamcast is more notorious for its overambitious budget than its poor sales figures. At the time of release in 1999, the game had the record for the most expensive production costs (over US$70 million), and its five-year production time. In comparison, the games' total sale was 1.2 million copies. Shenmue, however, was a critical hit, earning an average review score of 89%. The game was supposed to be the initial installment of a trilogy. The second installment was eventually released in 2001, but by this time the Dreamcast was floundering, so the game only saw a release in Japan and Europe. Sega eventually released it for North American players for the Xbox, but the poor performance of both titles combined with restructuring have made Sega reluctant to complete the trilogy for fear of failure to return on the investment. However, a Kickstarter campaign has received record support for a third title, with a release originally set for 2018, was eventually released on November 19, 2019. Ports of the first two titles were released in 2018 for PC, Xbox One and PlayStation 4 to re-acclimate players in preparation for the third title's release.

=== Sonic Boom: Rise of Lyric and Sonic Boom: Shattered Crystal ===
Sonic Boom: Rise of Lyric is a spin-off from the Sonic the Hedgehog series, released in 2014 and developed by Big Red Button Entertainment and IllFonic for Sega and Sonic Team, along with its handheld counterpart Sonic Boom: Shattered Crystal, which was developed by Sanzaru Games. Although both games received a negative reception, Rise of Lyric for the Wii U is particularly considered one of the worst video games of all time due to many glitches, poor gameplay and weak writing. Both games failed commercially, selling only 490,000 copies as of February 2015, making them the lowest-selling games in the Sonic franchise. Big Red Button had considered shuttering in the wake of Rise of Lyric's underperforming sales alongside its poor reception.

=== Sonic Runners ===
Sonic Runners is a Sonic the Hedgehog game for Android and iOS. A side-scrolling endless runner, it was Sonic Team's first Sonic game that was exclusive to smartphones. It was soft launched in select regions in February 2015 and officially released worldwide in June 2015 to mixed reviews. Although it was downloaded over five million times, the game's publisher, Sega, considered it a commercial failure because it only made between ¥30–50 million a month. As a result, it was discontinued in July 2016. Nintendo Life wrote its failure as proof that the recognizability of a brand does not guarantee success.

=== Suicide Squad: Kill the Justice League ===
Suicide Squad: Kill the Justice League was developed by Rocksteady Studios who previously developed the highly successful Batman: Arkham series for Warner Bros. Games. A continuation of their work in the DC Comics universe, the game focused on the rogue's gallery of villains. The game received lukewarm reviews, with particular criticism aimed at the game's live service elements, and fell below Warner Bros.' sales expectations. In May 2024, Warner Bros. took a $200 million impairment charge, in part due to the game's poor sales, and Rocksteady suffered layoffs in August 2024. In a financial statement in May 2025, Warner Bros. reported a 48% drop in gaming revenue over its prior year attributed to the failure of Suicide Squad alongside player attrition in its ongoing live service games.

=== Sunset ===
Sunset, a first-person exploration adventure game involving a housekeeper working for a dictator of a fictional country, was developed by two-person Belgian studio Tale of Tales, who previously had created several acclaimed arthouse style games and other audio-visual projects such as The Path. They wanted to make Sunset a "game for gamers" while still retaining their arthouse-style approach, and in addition to planning on a commercial release, used Kickstarter to gain funding. Sunset only sold about 4000 copies on its release, including those to Kickstarter backers. Tale of Tales opted to close their studio after sinking the company's finances into the game, and believed that if they did release any new games in the future, they would likely shy away from commercial release.

=== System Shock 2 ===
System Shock 2 is the 1999 sequel to the 1994 immersive sim System Shock. The original game was made by Looking Glass Studios and published by Origin Systems, a subsidiary of Electronic Arts at the time. System Shock was critically praised and had modest sales. Irrational Games was formed in 1997 by three former Looking Glass employees, and Looking Glass approached Irrational about co-developing a game like System Shock, and after several iterations, came to the idea of a direct sequel. System Shock 2 was similarly met with critical praise at release and was named as Game of the Year by several publications, but did not sell well, with only about 58,000 copies selling within eight months of release. For Looking Glass, System Shock 2, similar to Thief: The Dark Project, represent games that they had developed with multi-million dollar budgets that they could not recoup, and due to mounting debt, Looking Glass closed down in May 2000. Irrational wanted to continue to develop in the System Shock series, but Electronic Arts, which owned the intellectual property, felt sales of System Shock 2 failed to meet expectations to justify a sequel. Instead, Irrational set out to develop a game as a spiritual successor to the gameplay concepts of System Shock but without using the property, resulting in their 2007 hit title BioShock.

=== Uru: Ages Beyond Myst ===
The fourth game in the popular Myst series, released in 2003. It was developed by Cyan Worlds shortly after Riven was completed. The game took Cyan Worlds more than five years and $12 million to complete and was codenamed DIRT ("D'ni in real time"), then MUDPIE (meaning "Multi-User DIRT, Persistent / Personal Interactive Entertainment / Experience / Exploration / Environment"). Though it had generally positive reception, the sales were disappointing. In comparison, the first three Myst games had sold more than 12 million units collectively before Uru's release. Uru's poor sales were also considered a factor in financially burdening Cyan, contributing to the company's near closure in 2005.

=== Vampire: The Masquerade – Bloodlines 2 ===
Vampire: The Masquerade – Bloodlines 2 (2025) is a sequel to Vampire: The Masquerade – Bloodlines (2004), and both based on White Wolf Publishing's role-playing setting World of Darkness. Both games are action role-playing games. The first game was developed by Troika Games and published by Activision, and while it had positive reviews, it sold poorly due to competing with several other similar games that were released during the same period, notably Half-Life 2. Around 2015, White Wolf was acquired by Paradox Interactive, which including the World of Darkness property. Paradox decided to pursue the Bloodlines sequel, announcing the title in 2019 with Hardsuit Labs as the lead developer. Several issues and delays arose, leading Paradox to remove Hardsuit from the game and giving the development duties to The Chinese Room by 2023. Even with this switch, the game's release had numerous delays, with its eventual release in October 2025. Bloodlines 2 had average reviews, and initial sales estimate for its first month was around 100,000 copies and around £3 million in revenue, far below the projected development costs. Paradox announced that it was taking a 335 million kr (around £28 million) write-off on the development costs for the game, saying "The responsibility lies fully with us as the publisher. The game is outside of our core areas, in hindsight it is clear that this has made it difficult for us to gauge sales."

=== Warhammer Age of Sigmar: Realms of Ruin ===
The real-time strategy video game Realms of Ruin is based on Warhammer Age of Sigmar. It was developed by Frontier Developments and released on 17 November 2023. Despite the "mixed or average" reviews (Metacritic), RoR game sales were much lower than expected. The RoR concurrent players on Steam peaked at 1,572 with just 129 playing on Steam on 27 November 2023. Post-launch, Frontier adjusted their revenue expectations with an expected "loss of around £9 million". Gaming journalists generally consider Realms of Ruin a flop. Stats on Video Game Insights show merely 69,330 units were sold via Steam with 36 active players (24h peak) and 54.1% positive reviews by 18 July 2024. This caused Frontier Developments' shares to decline nearly 20%.

== Arcade game failures ==
=== I, Robot ===
Released by Atari in 1984, I, Robot was the first video game to use 3-D polygon graphics, and the first that allowed the player to change camera angles. It also had gameplay that rewarded planning and stealth as much as reflexes and trigger speed, and included a non-game mode called "Doodle City", where players could make artwork using the polygons. Production estimates vary, but consensus is that there were no more than 1500 units made.

=== Jack the Giantkiller ===
In 1982, the President of Cinematronics arranged a one-time purchase of 5000 printed circuit boards from Japan. The boards were used in the manufacture of several games, but the majority of them were reserved for the new arcade game Jack the Giantkiller, based on the classic fairy tale Jack and the Beanstalk. Between the purchase price of the boards and other expenses, Cinematronics invested almost two million dollars into Jack the Giantkiller. It completely flopped in the arcade and many of the boards went unsold, costing the company a huge amount of money at a time when it was already having financial difficulties.

=== Radar Scope ===
Radar Scope was one of the first arcade games released by Nintendo. It was released in Japan first, and a brief run of success there led Nintendo to order 3,000 units for the American market in 1980. However, American operators weren't impressed and Nintendo of America was stuck with about 2,000 unsold Radar Scope machines sitting in the warehouse.

Facing a potential financial disaster, Nintendo assigned the game's designer, Shigeru Miyamoto, to revamp the game. Instead he designed a brand new game that could be run in the same cabinets and on the same hardware as Radar Scope. That new game was the smash hit Donkey Kong, and Nintendo was able to recoup its investment in 1981 by converting the remaining unsold Radar Scope units to Donkey Kong and selling those.

=== Street Fighter III ===
Street Fighter III: New Generation was released by Capcom in 1997, and was the second game to use the CP System III board. It was the true follow-up to Street Fighter II which was a massive success in its day and was followed up with updates in the next few years, from Street Fighter II: Champion Edition in 1992, to Super Street Fighter II Turbo in 1994. Street Fighter III featured highly detailed art with highly animated sprites, alongside changes to series' mechanics including the new parry system. While the various versions of Street Fighter II would sell over 100,000 units worldwide, Street Fighter III would only mange to sell about 10,000. One agreed-on reason was the game facing a more crowded fighting game market compared to Street Fighter II kickstarting fighting games' popularity back in 1991. It was also already competing with the Street Fighter Alpha games, which had a more familiar roster with various characters from previous Street Fighter games and even Final Fight, while III was entirely newcomers with the exception of Ryu and Ken. 3D games, including fighting games like the Virtua Fighter and Tekken games were also more prevalent and trending around this time, while 2D sprite-based games were generally considered outdated around this time. Capcom would go on to release two updates to it, those being 2nd Impact, and 3rd Strike, with both being more well received, but Capcom would not make another numbered Street Fighter game until 2008 when they released Street Fighter IV.

=== Sundance ===
Sundance is an arcade vector game released in 1979. Producer Cinematronics planned to manufacture about 1000 Sundance units, but sales suffered from a combination of poor gameplay and an abnormally high rate of manufacturing defects. The fallout rate in production was about 50%, the vector monitor (made by an outside vendor) had a defective picture tube that would arc and burn out if the game was left in certain positions during shipping, and according to programmer Tim Skelly, the circuit boards required a lot of cut-and-jumpering between mother and daughter boards that also made for a very fragile setup. The units that survived to reach arcade floors were not a hit with gamers—Skelly himself reportedly felt that the gameplay lacked the "anxiety element" necessary in a good game and asked Cinematronics not to release it, and in an April 1983 interview with Video Games Magazine he referred to Sundance as "a total dog".

== See also ==
- List of video games notable for negative reception
- List of best-selling video games
- List of films considered the worst
- List of television shows notable for negative reception
- List of video games listed among the best
- List of commercial failures in computing
- List of commercial failures in video game consoles
