= List of commercial failures in computing =

Certain products related to computing, such as hardware, software, and smartphones, were mass-marketed and highly anticipated ahead of their launch, but are known to have failed commercially. Reasons for their failure include the products failing consumer expectations upon launch, the first round of units suffering defects, a controversy negatively affecting sales, or being the result of poor marketing, regardless of reception. In any case, these products failed to meet their companies' expectations needed to be considered successful, typically due to them failing on average to break even, resulting in the companies losing money. These high-profile items tend to appear on computer- and hardware-related "worst" lists or lists of failures (e.g., "tech fails").

== Hardware ==
=== Components and peripherals ===
==== CueCat (2000–2001) ====
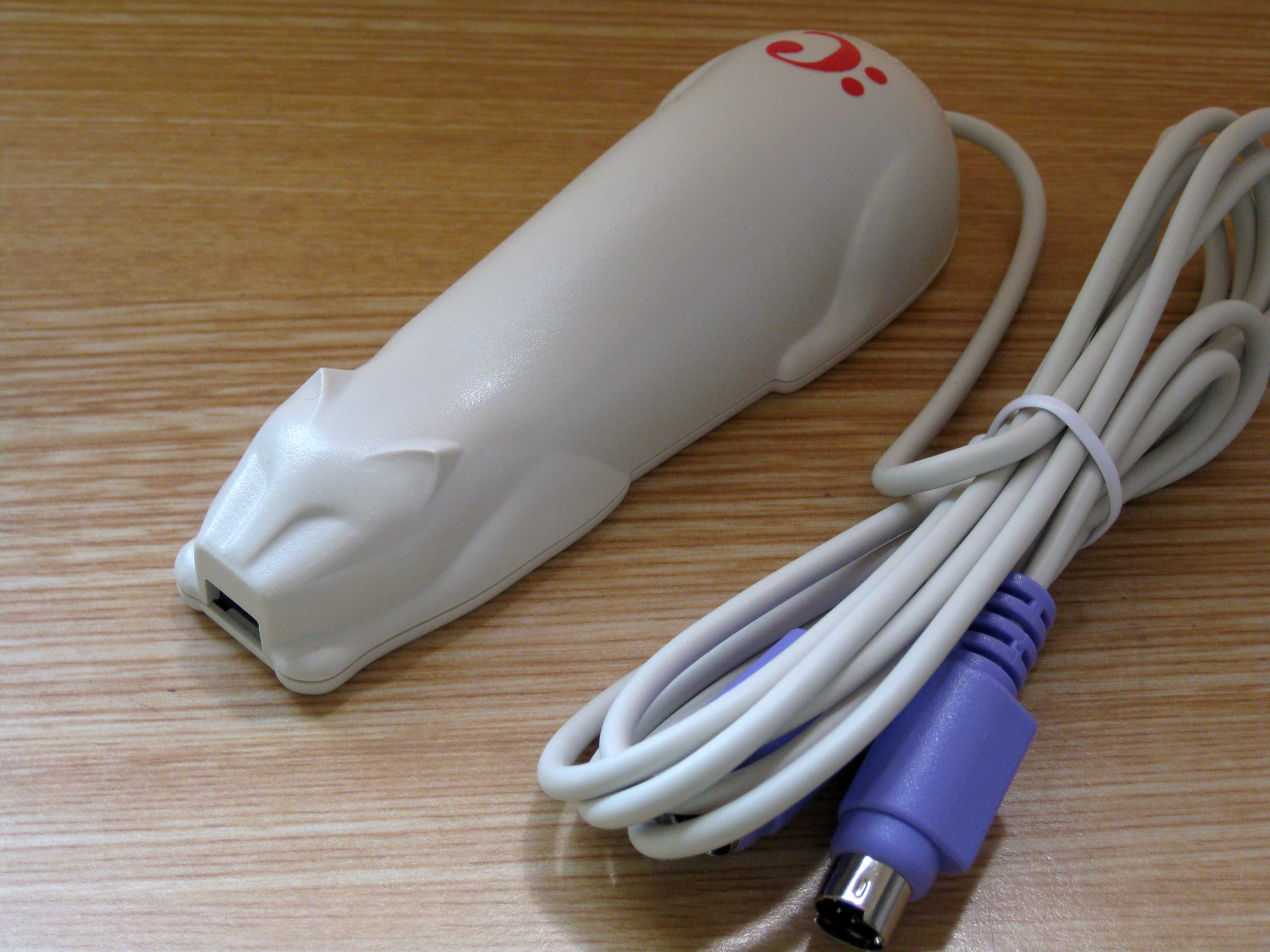
CueCat

The CueCat is a cat-shaped barcode reader created by Dallas-based Digital Convergence Corporation amid the dot-com bubble and distributed from 2000 until the company's bankruptcy in 2001. Invented by Jovan Hutton Pulitzer (then named Jeffry Jovan Philyaw) intended to make accessing the websites of advertisers from newspapers, magazines, and catalogs easier, the device was plugged into a computer through its PS/2 port (later a USB port) and, along with regular barcodes, could read specialized barcodes on printed advertisements, which would then take the user to the target web page. The company heavily promoted the CueCat as it aimed to sell 50 million units by the end of 2001. The product's sponsors included The Coca-Cola Company, RadioShack, NBC, and Belo Corporation. It also mailed hundreds of thousands to subscribers of newspapers and magazines; Forbes distributed about 830,000 units and Wired about 500,000.

The CueCat's concept of replacing typing in a URL with scanning barcodes for convenience was met with criticism and derision. Walt Mossberg of The Wall Street Journal lampooned the need to have a computer nearby when scanning, calling it "unnatural and ridiculous". He also found that the majority of the special barcodes did not match the printed URLs, instead linking to general web pages, for which he asserted he could have typed them in faster. In addition, Digital Convergence received criticism for using the devices to send personally identifiable information of their users back to the company. The security concerns were amplified when, in late 2000, the CueCat website was subject to a breach that exposed the users' personal names and email addresses. Digital Convergence ended up giving out four million units in the United States—far short of its 50 million goal—with six million left unsold, and the company folded in 2001. The CueCat was ranked No. 20 on PC World's list of "The 25 Worst Tech Products of All Time". It also landed on Time's list of "The 50 Worst Inventions", calling it "little more than a high-tech paperweight". Despite its poor showing, the CueCat has been viewed as a precursor to QR codes, which have become ubiquitous.

==== Itanium (2001–2020) ====
Itanium logo

Itanium was a brand of 64-bit Intel microprocessors first announced in 1994 and released in 2001, after long delays. It was born in December 1988 as a secret Hewlett-Packard research project to succeed the company's PA-RISC instruction set architecture. Intel had its own processor in development, which would have extended its own x86 architecture to 64 bits while still retaining x86 compatibility, but dropped all work on the chip's design by June 8, 1994, when it announced a collaboration with Hewlett-Packard to develop a new 64-bit architecture called IA-64.

Intel announced the Itanium in 1997 with considerable fanfare, with International Data Group initially projecting sales to reach $38 billion by 2001. However, the first Itanium processor, codenamed Merced, suffered development delays, leading Silicon Graphics to cancel its first-generation Itanium system and Sun Microsystems to abandon the Itanium version of its Solaris operating system. Merced garnered a negative reception upon its May 2001 release for its sluggish performance and software incompatibility with x86-based processors. Meanwhile, in 2003, Advanced Micro Devices announced the first fully x86-compatible 64-bit processor, AMD64-based Opteron, and Intel faced a new challenger to its dominance in the office and home user markets. Intel was also forced to lower its ambitions for the struggling Itanium to being only a niche product for high-end systems, or what Pat Gelsinger called "the biggest iron". Further trouble was spelled in 2005, when Microsoft canceled Windows for Itanium-based workstations and IBM and Dell dropped Itanium servers, with HP being the only top server manufacturer to sell them. When in 2019 Intel announced that it would accept orders up until January 30, 2020, and ship the last microprocessors by July 29, 2021, the only systems that were powered by an Itanium 9700-based chip, the last of the Itanium chips sold, were HPE Integrity Superdome computers. Far short of IDG's original projections, the Itanium line of processors generated sales worth only $1.4 billion, against an estimated billions invested into the project, and ultimately failed to replace the x86 architecture. The Itanium was soon recognized as a failure, for which the computer industry dubbed it "Itanic", after the ill-fated ocean liner.

=== Personal computers ===
==== TI-99/4 (1979–1981) ====
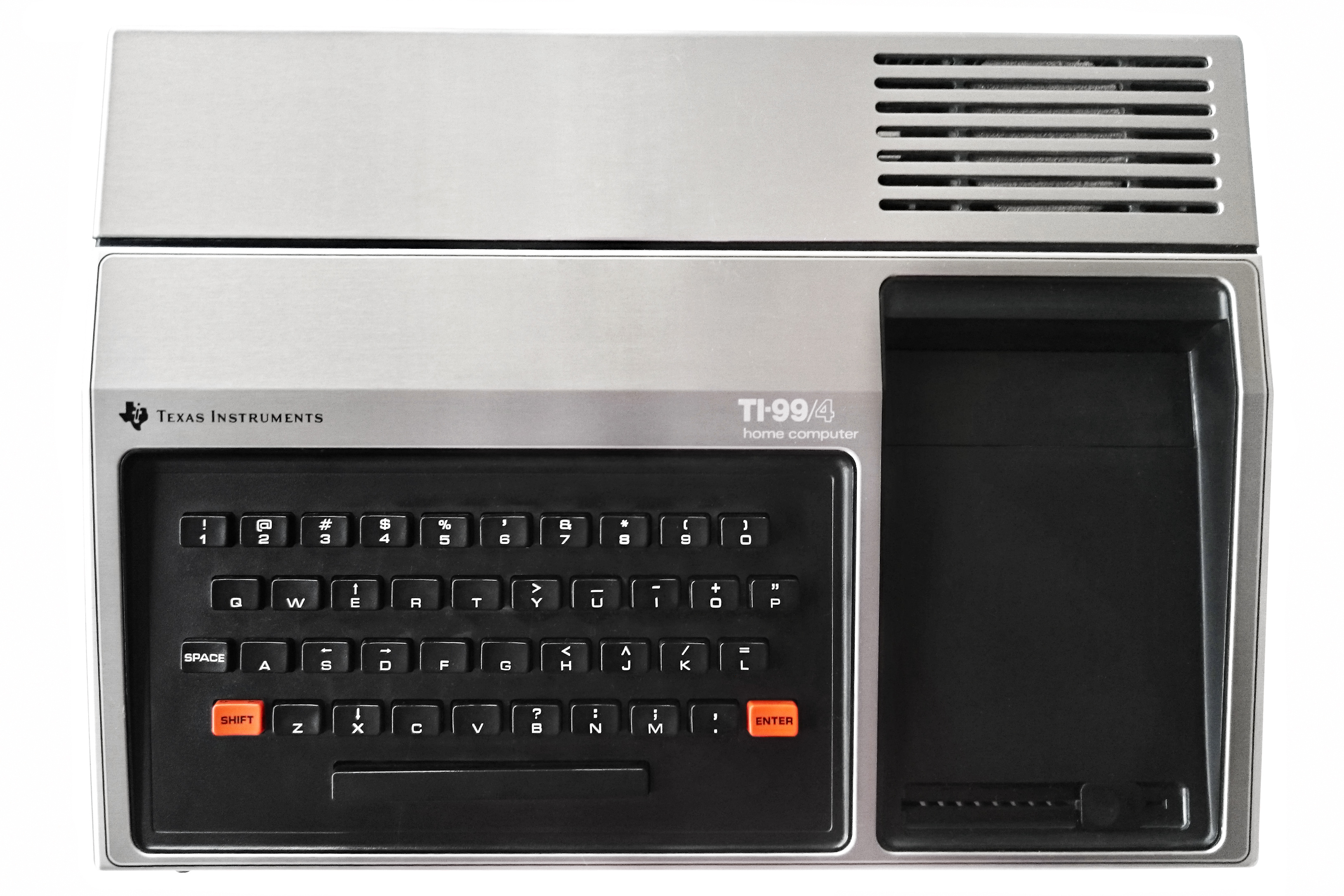
TI-99/4

The TI-99/4 was the first mass-marketed home computer with a 16-bit microprocessor, which in this case was the TMS9900—the same processor used by TI-990 minicomputers. Manufactured by Texas Instruments, the TI-99/4 was born from two separate projects for a low-end video game console and a hobbyist-oriented personal computer, which were merged into one as a result of the two teams competing for the same company resources. The computer first retailed for $1,150 (equivalent to $5,101 in 2025) in 1979 and, due to the Federal Communications Commission's strict RFI emissions regulations, shipped with a 13 in (33 cm) custom color TV monitor.

The TI-99/4, intended to serve both the video game and home computer markets, was received negatively. The chiclet keyboard was widely criticized, which, according to Joseph Nocera of Texas Monthly, "became the symbol for everything that was wrong" with the computer. A dearth of third-party software was also noted, due to both the hurdles of writing programs imposed by the TMS9900 processor and Texas Instruments' insistence that it make a profit from third-party software. The computer was referred to by The New York Times as "an embarrassing failure". The high cost of the TMS9900's nonstandard packaging precluded the company from earning a profit for each machine sold, and various reports estimate that only between 20,000 and 100,000 units were ever sold. Two editors for Creative Computing voted the TI-99/4 as one of the world's worst computers, ranked No. 6 on PC Magazine's list of "The 12 Biggest PC Duds Ever", and PC World ranked the machine No. 6 on its list of "The 10 Worst PCs of All Time", both criticizing the chiclet keyboard and the latter magazine also citing the need to connect to the computer's own display as one of the reasons for its failure. The computer was supplanted in 1981 by an upgrade, the TI-99/4A, Texas Instruments' only other home computer before abandoning the market.

==== Apple III (1980–1984) ====
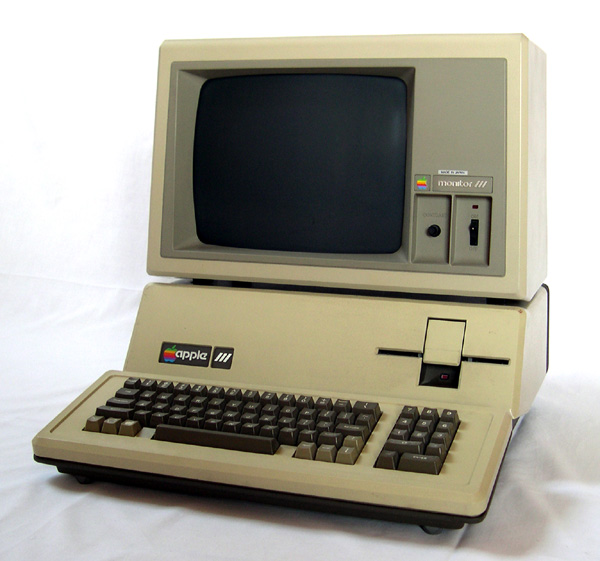
Apple III

The Apple III, released in November 1980 as the successor to Apple II, was the first Apple computer not designed by Steve Wozniak, but rather by a committee of engineers led by Steve Jobs. The Apple III was sold as a business computer and housed a 1.8 MHz Synertek 6502A or 6502B processor and 128 KB of dynamic RAM. The Apple III was capable of resolutions of up to 560 × 192 pixels in black and white and up to 280 × 192 in up to 16 simultaneous colors, as well as displaying 80 columns and 24 rows of text, both capital and lowercase.

The Apple III failed commercially for multiple reasons. The computer, initially priced between $4,340 (equivalent to $16,959 in 2025) and $7,800 depending on options, was deemed "absurdly" high even for professional users. In addition, the internal structure of the first batch of units, described as "a disaster" by The Daily Telegraph, used an aluminum enclosure inside the plastic case as the heat sink instead of a cooling fan, reputedly to meet Steve Jobs' demands for a silent computer and reduce RFI emissions, a severe problem affecting the Apple II. The result was that the Apple III would overheat, with the components lacking airflow, the motherboard being distorted by the heat and some chips slipping out of their sockets. 20 percent of the units failed to work as a result of the chips slipping during their shipment. Apple's public relations department later suggested that users lift the front of their units and drop them six inches off the desktop in hopes of re-seating the chips. A revised edition, launched in December 1981 for $3,495, addressed the overheating problem. Lastly, the Apple III shipped with an emulator mode that nominally ensured compatibility with Apple II software. However, many Apple II programs directly wrote on memory using PEEK and POKE commands, which did not align with the Apple III's memory structure. InfoCorp, a research firm, estimated that Apple sold only 75,000 units in December 1983, when the company was forced to redesign the Apple III to meet the Federal Communications Commission's requirements for low RFI emissions. The new computer, Apple III Plus, at a price of $2,995, brought the figure to an estimated 120,000 units sold, but the brand's reputation remained poor, and it was discontinued in April 1984. The original Apple III has been described as one of the worst computers of all time by PC World and Maximum PC, as well as one of the "20 spectacular failures" according to Byte and one of "the 10 greatest flops in computer history" according to The Daily Telegraph.

==== Apple Lisa (1983–1986) ====
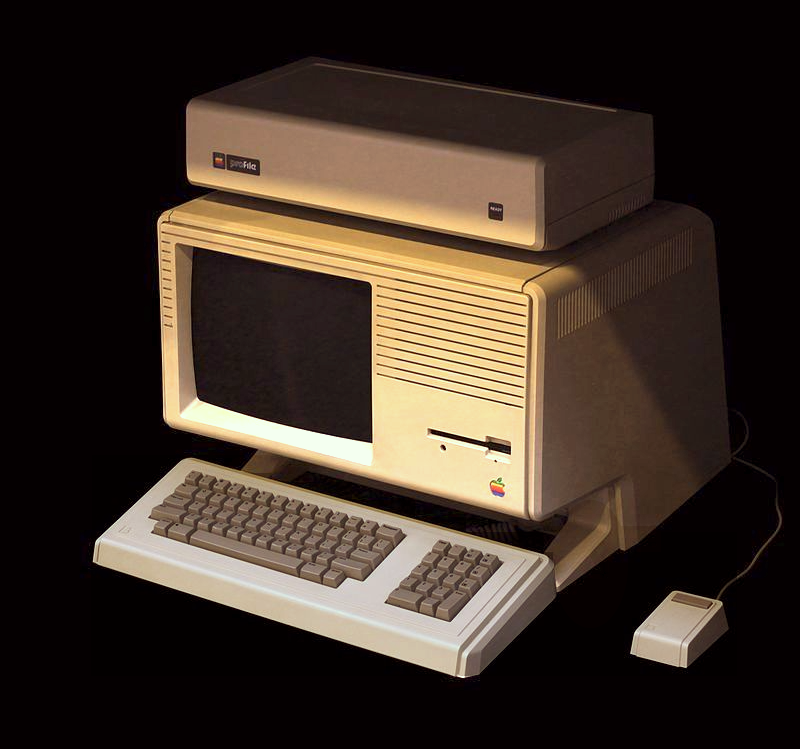
Apple Lisa

Lisa is a home computer created and launched by Apple Computer on January 19, 1983, succeeding the company's best-selling computer, the Apple II. Lisa was the first commercialized personal computer with a graphical user interface, as opposed to a command-line interface. Lisa began development in 1978 and was to be a business computer with a built-in green phosphor display, keyboard, and command-line interface due to ship in March 1981 and retail for $2,000. However, it was discovered that designing a computer around a bit-slice microprocessor would be too expensive, so the idea was abandoned. Jef Raskin's visit to Xerox PARC, known among the American computer industry for the Xerox Alto, in the early 1970s also changed the course of Lisa's development. Raskin would have his student at University of California, San Diego, software engineer Bill Atkinson, convince Steve Jobs to visit PARC, and Jobs would recognize the value of GUIs in personal computers. Lisa's original project manager, Ken Rothmuller, who had complained that Trip Hawkins's market requirements document's specifications for a GUI, a mouse, a local area network, file servers, and innovative applications would take too long and be too costly to incorporate into the machine, was replaced with John Couch. The Lisa team demanded more than a computer with a Xerox Alto-inspired GUI, which it had reinvented to include novelties such as the menu bar, pull-down menus, the one-button mouse, cutting and pasting with the clipboard, and the Trash can. Ultimately, the computer's release date was pushed back to 1983, retailing for $9,995 (equivalent to $32,309 in 2025) as it shipped with a Motorola 68000, 1 MB of RAM, two 5¼-inch floppy drives, a 5 MB hard disk drive, a built-in 12 in (30 cm) monochrome display, and seven applications.

Lisa struggled in the market for multiple reasons. The first was the price of the computer compared to its competitors, such as the popular IBM PC, which was introduced for $1,565. Secondly, its operating system, Lisa OS, supported preemptive multitasking, but it could not keep up with multiple programs running at the same time as it was paired with the Motorola 68000. The third reason was the unreliability of the hard drives, which were built in-house at Jobs' behest despite none at Apple having prior experience building one from scratch. The fourth reason was the lack of third-party software, which has been attributed to Lisa's bundled suite of applications that in turn discouraged developers from supporting it. Lastly, the press anticipation building up around what became Macintosh, further dimmed the machine's prospects. Apple took steps to reduce the cost of Lisa and lure back customers, eventually launching the Lisa 2 series with the base model now costing $3,495 and the high-end model, Lisa 2/10, having more memory and twice the capacity of the hard drive. However, Macintosh still outsold Lisa three to one. Apple rebranded Lisa 2/10 as Macintosh XL, also bundling it with a Macintosh emulator called MacWorks, and dropped the remaining Lisa models in January 1985 to consolidate the Macintosh line. Although the newly renamed computer's sales began to improve, it was officially discontinued on April 29, leaving an installed base of 60,000 units. Due to its price and the arrival of the much cheaper Macintosh, Lisa was named one of "20 spectacular failures" by Byte. It was also ranked No. 8 both on PC Magazine's and Maximum PC's lists of "The 12 Biggest PC Duds Ever" and "The 16 Worst Failed Computers of All Time", respectively, and listed by The Daily Telegraph as one of "the 10 greatest flops in computer history".

==== Coleco Adam (1983–1985) ====
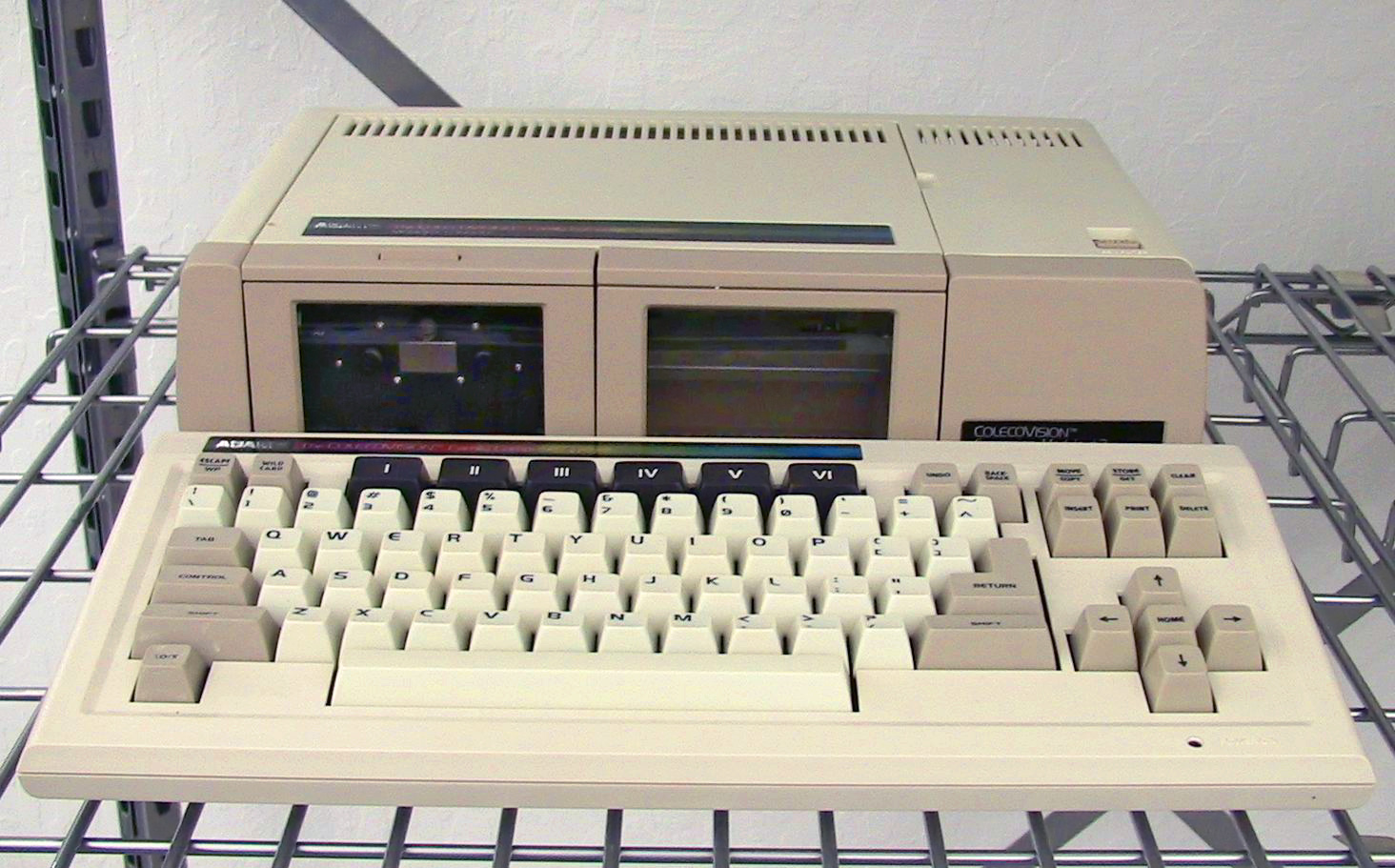
Coleco Adam

The Coleco Adam was Coleco's home computer released in October 1983, after the success of the company's video game console, ColecoVision, and against the backdrop of the ongoing video game crash. Initially retailed for less than $750 (equivalent to $2,424 in 2025), it was a complete low-cost system that shipped with a 75-key typewriter-style keyboard, a daisy-wheel printer, one drive for a class of proprietary data cassettes called Digital Data Packs with the option of a second, a Zilog Z80A as its main processor, and 80 KB of RAM expandable to 144 KB, with 16 KB dedicated to the video display. It was also fully backwards-compatible with all ColecoVision game cartridges and accessories via its cartridge and expansion slots and was packaged with a word processor, two ColecoVision joysticks, and three Digital Data Packs, one containing a version of BASIC called SmartBASIC, one preformatted to store programs and files, and a native copy of Buck Rogers: Planet of Zoom.

The Adam was sold in two versions: as a standalone unit and as Expansion Module No. #3 for the ColecoVision, which upgraded it to a home computer. Jules H. Gilder of Byte praised the high-speed tape system in general despite it not using floppy disks and wrote "three cheers" for the keyboard, but criticized the lack of a COPY command for creating backups, called the manual for SmartBASIC the worst he had ever seen, questioned Coleco's decision to limit the computer's technical information to licensed developers, and raised the Adam's aforementioned reliability record. He found the machine's potential to not be fully realized and, believing it could fail like the Mattel Aquarius before it, recommended holding off purchasing one until Coleco fixed all the problems and delivered its promises. Rushed into production ahead of Christmas 1983, the computer was plagued with numerous faults, with rates of returns of defective machines estimated to be as high as 60 percent. One dramatic fault was the system's ability to erase contents on a Digital Data Pack; this would result from a surge of electromagnetic energy emitted from the system's power supply on startup while the pack was left in the drive. The unusual daisy-chaining of the computer's components reduced the number of cables connected to the base, but also had the power supply located in the printer, and many Adams were rendered useless due to defective printers. The Adam was a marketing disaster for Coleco, which had spent $258 million repairing the computers, and price reductions down to $300 and even vouchers for a $500 college scholarship could not compensate for its continued poor sales. Only about 95,000 units were shipped by the end of 1983, a far cry from the original promise of 500,000, and Coleco discontinued the Adam in January 1985. The Adam was voted by three editors for Creative Computing as one of the world's worst computers, No. 3 on Maximum PC's list of "The 16 Worst Failed Computers of All Time", and as the third worst PC of all time by PC World.

==== Osborne Executive (1983) ====
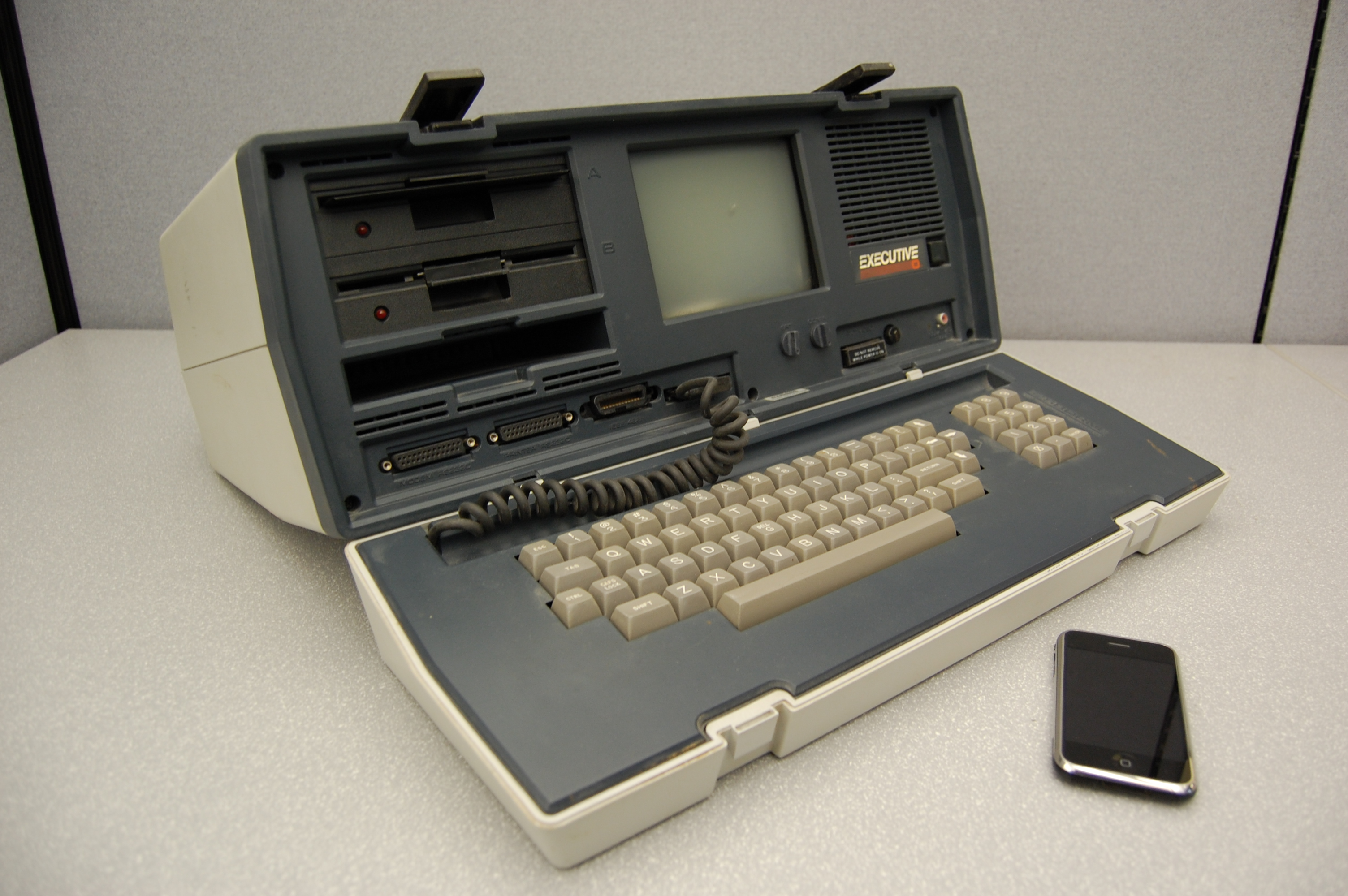
Osborne Executive

The Osborne Executive is a self-named portable computer developed in 1983 by Osborne Computer Corporation, founded in 1981 by Adam Osborne, as the successor to its Osborne 1. The Osborne 1, credited as the world's first mass-marketed portable computer, was highly successful, but it had drawn criticism for its small screen size, meager memory, and a shortage of high-quality software. The Executive was released to address these issues, with a larger screen and more memory. However, it also cost more than the Osborne 1, at $2,495 (equivalent to $8,324 in 2025). As with the Osborne 1, the Executive was opened to reveal the built-in monitor, two floppy drives, and a detachable keyboard.

Before its announcement of the Executive, Osborne Computer Corporation was known to sell lightweight computers and for far less than its competitors, yet earn twice as much profit as the industry average. It was also one of the fastest growing companies in United States history, boasting yearly sales approaching $100 million. Nonetheless, it soon faced stiff competition from rivals such as IBM and Japanese computer manufacturers, who were producing more affordable machines with improved features. Seeking to stay ahead of the competition and vastly expand his company's operations to a $1 billion business in two years, Adam Osborne chose to invest in the development of three new products: the Executive 1, the more powerful IBM PC-compatible Executive 2, and the Vixen, which was to be sold at a lower price than the Osborne 1, and it became immediately apparent that their announcements was the company's liability. The announcement of the Executive's imminent release evaporated the 25-month backlog of orders for the Osborne 1, depriving the company of its major source of income, aggravated by a combination of repeated delays of the product, increasing consumer expectations for a computer, and IBM's unexpectedly aggressive endeavor in the portable market. The Executive was perceived as expensive compared to the competition and outdated due to its continued used of the CP/M when other manufacturers had adopted the IBM PC as the standard. In September 1983, Osborne Computer filed for bankruptcy, with only the first Executive model brought to fruition (although the Vixen was later revived and released). The Osborne effect refers to an upcoming product cannibalizing the sales of an existing product as a result of the company prematurely announcing the successor.

==== Commodore SX-64 (1984–1986) ====
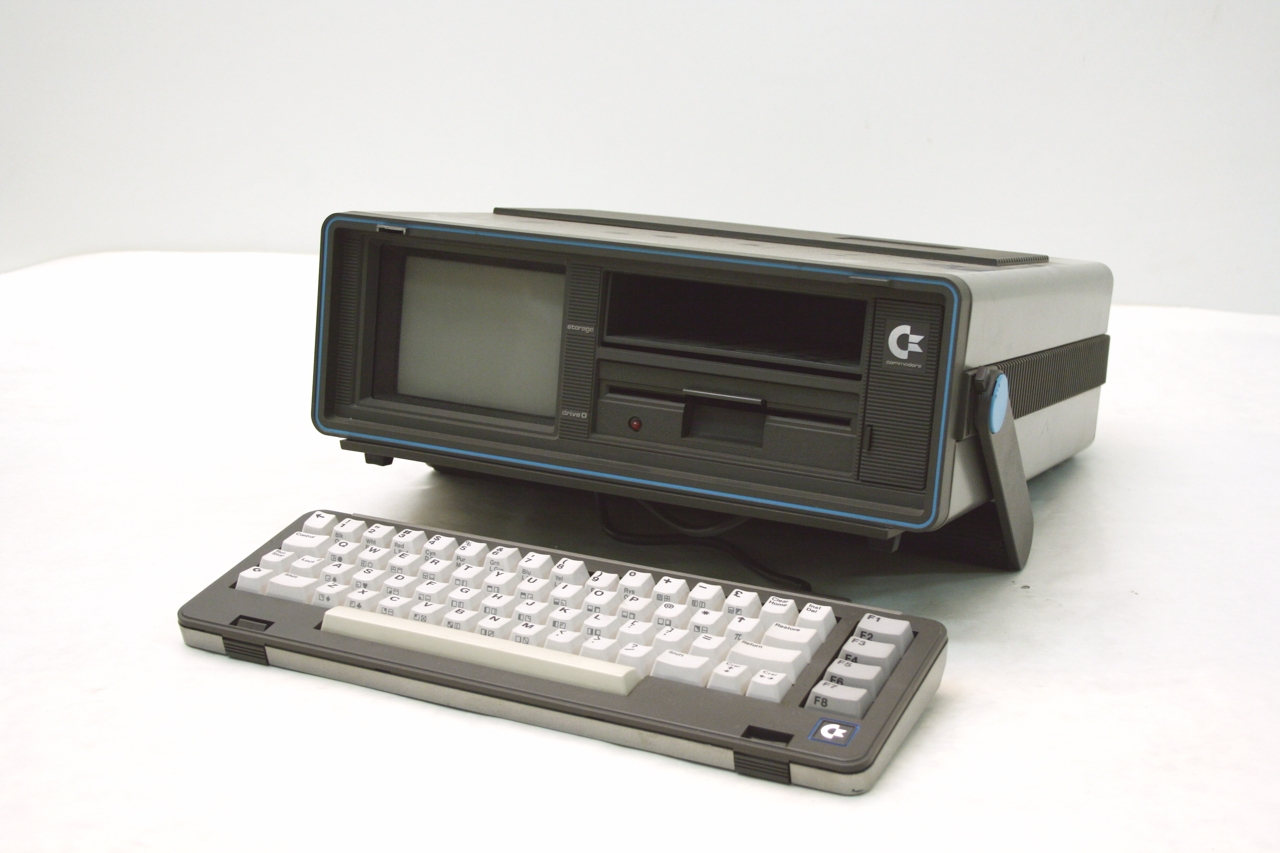
Commodore SX-64

The Commodore SX-64 is a portable computer based on Commodore International's most popular model, the Commodore 64, that debuted at the Winter Consumer Electronics Show of 1984, although it was first introduced at the same show a year earlier as a prototype. With a 5 in (13 cm) color screen, it is the first commercial portable computer with a color display. The SX-64 weighed 23 pounds (10 kg), measured 14.5×14.5×5 in (37×37×13 cm), and was almost fully compatible with software for the original Commodore 64, although it lacked a cassette tape port. The machine shipped with a built-in 1541 drive that sat below a compartment for storing disks and with enough space for a theoretical second drive. It was possible to connect the unit to a larger monitor, but it lacked an RF output, and it needed to be connected to an AC power outlet.

Sales of the SX-64 have been considered to be poor, disappointing Commodore as it had hoped that the portable would prove popular among business users, who instead viewed it as simply a portable version of the consumer-oriented Commodore 64. Along with a lack of focus on business software, the weight and small screen size were cited as factors contributing to the sluggish sales, as was the introductory price of $995 (equivalent to $3,083 in 2025)—nearly five times the price of a Commodore 64. The SX-64 was discontinued in 1986. Despite its lackluster sales, the computer has become a collector's item.

==== IBM PCjr (1984–1985) ====
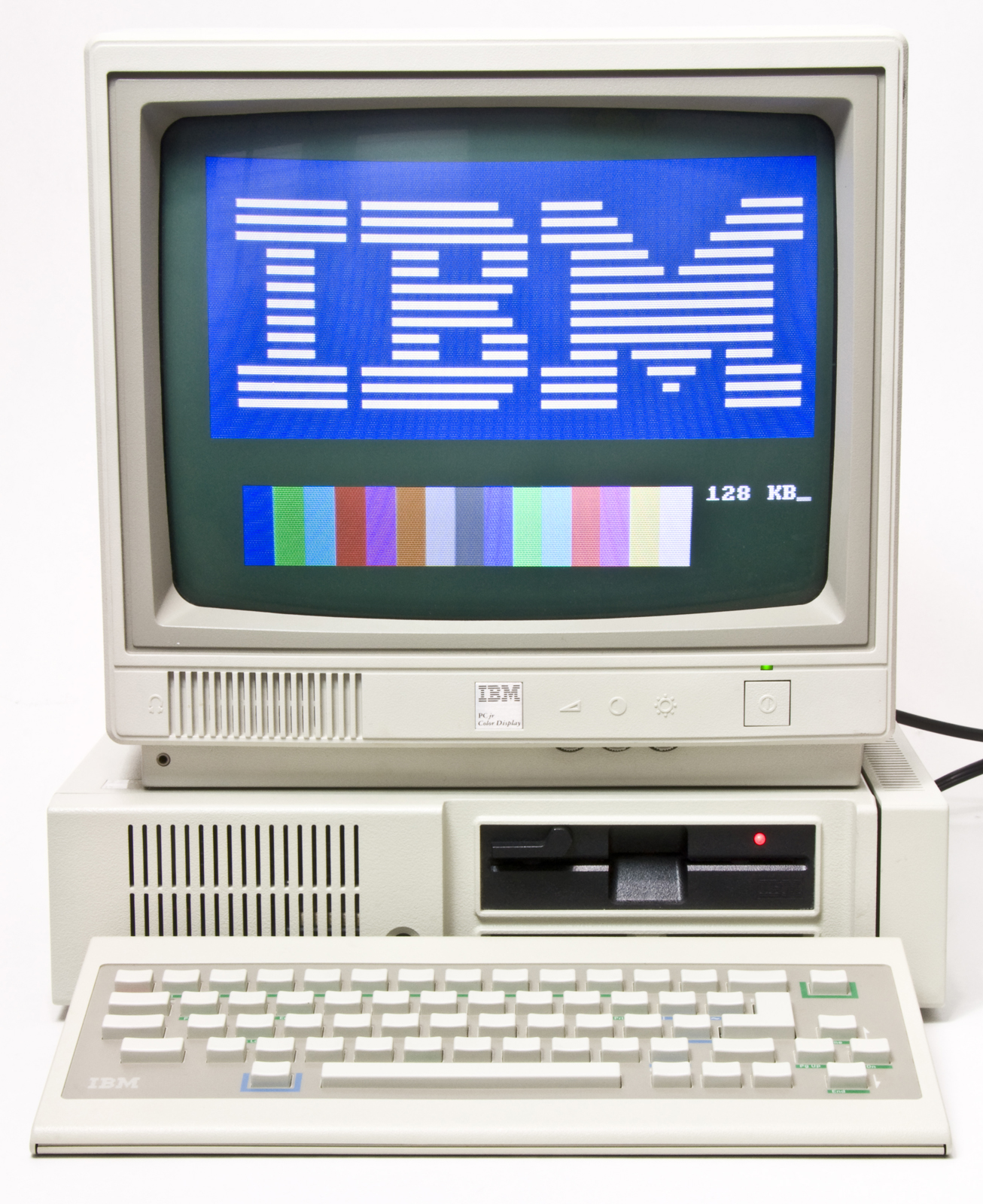
IBM PCjr

In February 1982, after the launch of its highly successful IBM PC, IBM started three projects for the PC XT, PC AT, and PCjr. The PCjr would be the low-end home computer and become the first mass-marketed IBM product. Its original project manager, Bill Sydnes, sought a machine that would compete with the Apple II at a lower price, and, although its capabilities would be more limited than an IBM PC, they could be improved with hardware upgrades. However, six months into development, problems began to arise when Don Estridge, corporate vice president and head of the PC division, decided he disliked the concept of a consumer-oriented computer. The two disagreed over the PCjr's design and marketing. Particularly, Sydnes wanted it sold by general retail stores such as Kmart and J. C. Penney, but Estridge limited the vendors to conventional computer outlets, likely due to the tedium of stores applying for authorization. In addition, whereas Sydnes aimed for complete compatibility with the IBM PC, Estridge claimed that it would greatly cannibalize the PC's sales, although he agreed that the two computers ought to be compatible with spreadsheets and word processors. Sydnes resigned in the spring of 1983 and was replaced by Dave O'Connor. The design and production problems he inherited from his predecessor as a result of internal strife, along with what Dan Wilkie saw as a free hand for a team who lacked the competence to build the PCjr successfully, caused the team to miss engineering delays, ultimately pushing actual shipping to March 1984.

The PCjr was available in two models: a base model for $669 (equivalent to $2,073 in 2025) and the higher-end Expanded Model for $1,269 (equivalent to $3,933 in 2025). The base model contains 64 KB of RAM and produces 40 columns for video output, while the Expanded Model, to which the base model can be upgraded, holds a total of 128 KB of RAM, supports 80-column video displays, and has a built-in floppy drive that loads 5¼-inch double-sided double-density disks with 360 KB of storage. Both models equipped with an Intel 8088 microprocessor, a keyboard that is connected with a detachable cord or wirelessly via the infrared link or, and PC DOS 2.1 as the operating system, but a display device had to be bought separately. Notably, the computer could display up to 16 colors and play up to three musical voices simultaneously—two clear advantages over the IBM PC—along with two slots for ROM cartridges, two joystick ports, and an unusual "user-friendly" design feature allowing for expansion modules called "sidecars" that could be daisy-chained, contributing significantly to the unit's width.

The PCjr's November 1983 debut drew a positive press reception. Several publishers briefly ran magazines dedicated to the PCjr, including Compute! for the PC and PCjr, the spinoff PCjr Magazine, and a supplement called PCjr World. Developers of add-ons for the original IBM PC viewed the PCjr as a lucrative investment, believing, according to PCjr Magazine, that the computer would be "a runaway success". The computer's reception upon launch was mixed, with computer magazines such as Byte praising the graphical and sound capabilities, the software base, and the documentation and customer service. However, its limited expandability, including beyond 128 KB of memory, and high price for a home computer received criticism. One widely maligned feature was the chiclet keyboard of the first models, which Byte called "a real loser" and which continued to draw the machine scorn that would persist even after IBM had shipped an advanced version of the PCjr at the end of July 1984 replacing it with a typewriter-style keyboard. The computer struggled to capture the home computer market, as customers expected a machine that would handle all the major software running on their office PCs flawlessly. IBM's July revision of the PCjr also allowed for expansion to 512 KB of memory, and the Enhanced Model now cost $999. However, the improvements and the price reduction did little to help the PCjr commercially. Finally, for Christmas 1984, in its last-ditch effort to save the PCjr, IBM pursued an aggressive, unprecedented marketing campaign and allowed vendors to sell a unit with a color monitor for $799. The holiday promotion significantly bolstered the PCjr's sales, with sources attributing 80 percent of a quarter of a million units sold in 1984. Nevertheless, at that price, the company failed to generate sufficient profit, and some industry experts believed that IBM was selling each unit at a loss. IBM ended the PCjr's production on March 19, 1985.

In adding the PCjr to its list of "20 spectacular failures", Byte deemed the computer a "cruelly crippled cousin of the IBM PC" that was overshadowed by Apple's Macintosh and "died a laughingstock" a year later. The PCjr topped PC Magazine's list of "The 12 Biggest PC Duds Ever", was named the 13th worst tech product of all time by PC World, and the 16th worst failed computer by Maximum PC, and as one of "the 10 greatest flops in computer history" by The Daily Telegraph.

==== Macintosh Portable (1989–1991) ====
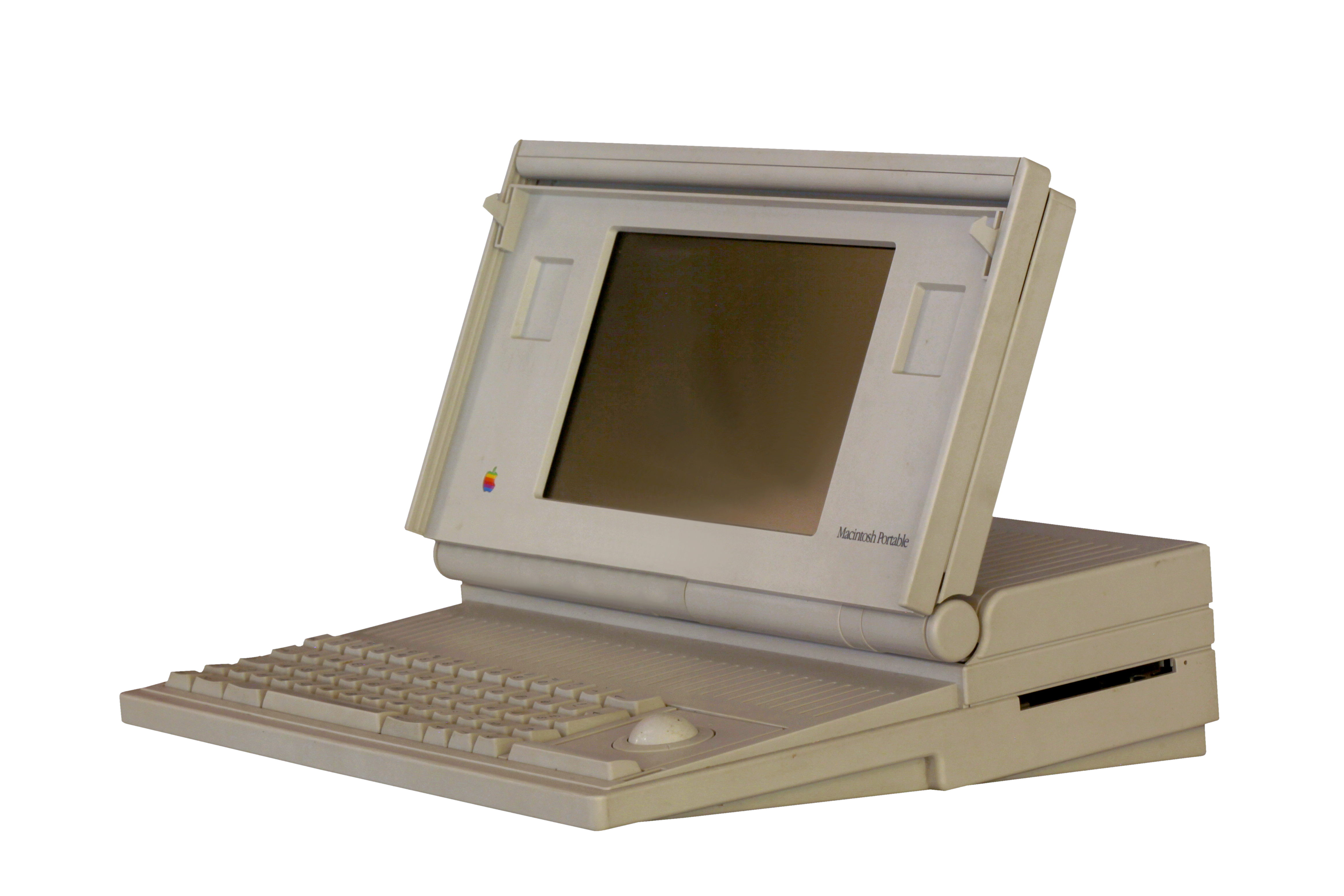
Machintosh Portable

The Macintosh Portable is the first battery-powered Macintosh and Apple Computer's first portable computer, released in 1989 and featuring 1 MB of static random-access memory, a 16 MHz Motorola 68HC000, a black-and-white active matrix LCD display, a floppy disk drive, an SCSI mode allowing the unit to be used as a hard drive, and a removable trackball device. It weighed 16 pounds (7.3 kg) and measured up to 4 inches (10 cm) thick, with lead-acid batteries contributing to the bulk of the weight. Reviews of the Portable were mixed, which tended to praise the LCD display, considered state-of-the-art technology at the time, but criticize the weight, size, and its high price, which ranged from $5,700 (equivalent to $14,805 in 2025) to over $7,000 depending on which features were included. In comparison, an MS-DOS-running portable could weigh less than 10 pounds (4.5 kg) and cost under $3,000, and portables from Poqet and Atari Corporation—released almost concurrently with the Macintosh Portable—weighed under 2 pounds (0.91 kg) and fit inside a coat pocket. One analyst, David Cearly of Gartner Group, said, "One can only wonder how many people are willing to pay $8,000 for what essentially is a second computer." The editor of a personal computer newsletter in New York, Richard Shaffer, wrote, "This machine would have been OK 12 months or 18 months ago. But not today."

According to Tom Thompson of Byte, for the two years it was on the market, the Portable was the butt of jokes due to its size and weight compared to DOS portables. Sales of the Portable proved disappointing, with only 10,000 units sold in the first quarter of its availability, short of Apple's projection of 50,000 units in the first year, and the computer was superseded by three models of the PowerBook. The Portable has been ranked No. 17 of PC World's list of "The 25 Worst Tech Products of All Time" and No. 14 on Maximum PC's list of "The 16 Worst Failed Computers of All Time". Complex placed it No. 29 on its list of "The 50 Worst Fails In Tech History", and the Spanish magazine Computer Hoy also listed the Portable as the 4th worst computer, with both publications citing the weight, cost, and poor battery life and the latter calling it ugly.

==== 3Com Audrey (2000–2001) ====
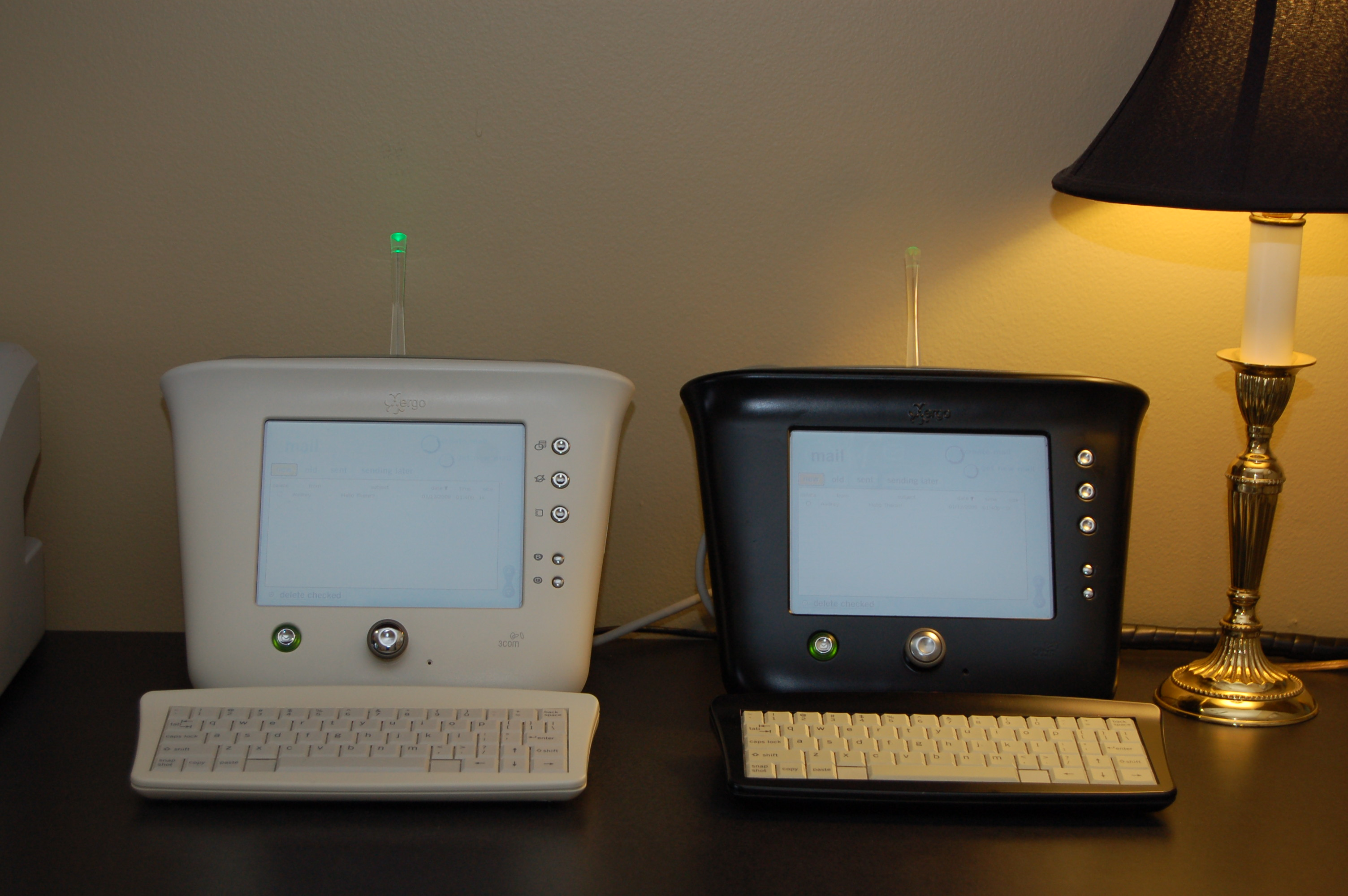
Two 3Com Audrey units, the right one custom-painted

3Com was an American company known for developing modems and network interface controllers. 3Com conceived of a simple, low-cost Internet appliance that would keep a household wirelessly connected and virtually informed on Internet content, emails, and schedules from anywhere in the house, especially the kitchen. The result was the October 17, 2000, launch of the 3Com Audrey, a trapezoidal QNX-based tablet that had an 8 in (20 cm) touchscreen controlled with a stylus and was available in five kitchen colors. As well as with a bundled wireless keyboard, the user could write or draw with the stylus and send the handwritten messages by email. The Audrey also featured a built-in microphone used to record voicemail and a knob stylized like a television dial used to select websites formatted for the Audrey. Notably, as Palm, Inc. was a spinoff of 3Com, the tablet's HotSync technology allowed multiple Palm devices to synchronize with the unit's PIM.

PC Magazine became less skeptical of Internet appliances after testing the Audrey, ultimately recommending it. In contrast, David Pogue of The New York Times, while writing that the device "st[ood] head and shoulders" among the competition, criticized the small keyboard and the device's feminine design, which he viewed as patronizing. Like other Internet appliances, the Audrey failed to take off due to low consumer demand for a computer that cost as much as a full-fledged one, and was thus discontinued on June 1, 2001, although it gained popularity among hackers who reprogrammed the device for other purposes such as controlling household appliances. For its limited functionality and lack of broadband support, PC World added the Audrey as one of its "(Dis)Honorable Mentions" on its list of the worst tech products, deeming it "a symbol" of why Internet appliances failed. PC Magazine included the Audrey on its list of "The Biggest Hardware Flops of All Time", citing the price and the unfortunate timing of its release amid the dot-com crash.

==== Power Mac G4 Cube (2000–2001) ====
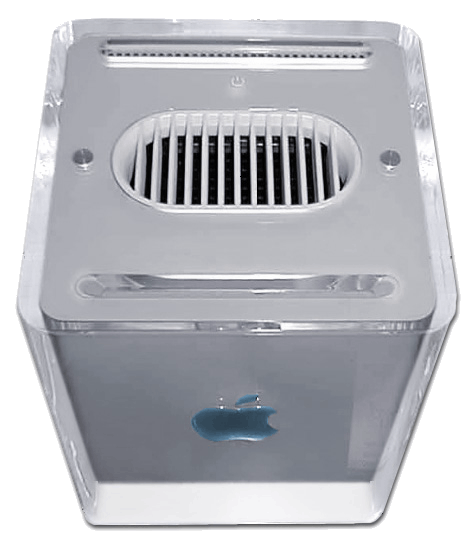
Power Mac G4 Cube

The Power Mac G4 Cube is a Mac developed by Apple Inc. between July 2000 and 2001. Conceived as a miniaturized but powerful computer by then-Apple CEO Steve Jobs, it was marketed as being between the consumer iMac G3 and the professional Power Mac G4 in the product range. The computer, designed by Jony Ive, was encased and suspended in acrylic glass measuring 7.7×7.7×9.8 in (20×20×25 cm), with the transparent plastic intended to lend the impression of a floating machine.

While the Cube received positive reviews and awards for its design, reviewers noted that it was expensive compared to its power and lacked expandability. It was further criticized for its tendency to develop cracks in its case, significantly impacting sales of a computer favored by potential buyers for its aesthetics. The product was an immediate commercial failure, selling only about 150,000 units before it was discontinued just less than a year after its release. Macworld's Benj Edwards wrote that consumers regarded the Cube as "an underpowered, over-expensive toy or [...] an emotionally inaccessible, ultra-geometric gray box suspended in an untouchable glass prison". Maximum PC ranked the Cube No. 2 on its list of "The 16 Worst Failed Computers of All Time", citing its costs and cosmetic defects. Despite its commercial failure, the Cube influenced future Apple products; capacitive touch would reappear in Apple's iPod and iPhone lines, and the company's miniaturization efforts would benefit computers such as the iMac G4 and the Mac Mini, whose design was inspired by the Cube.

=== Mobile ===
==== JooJoo (2010) ====
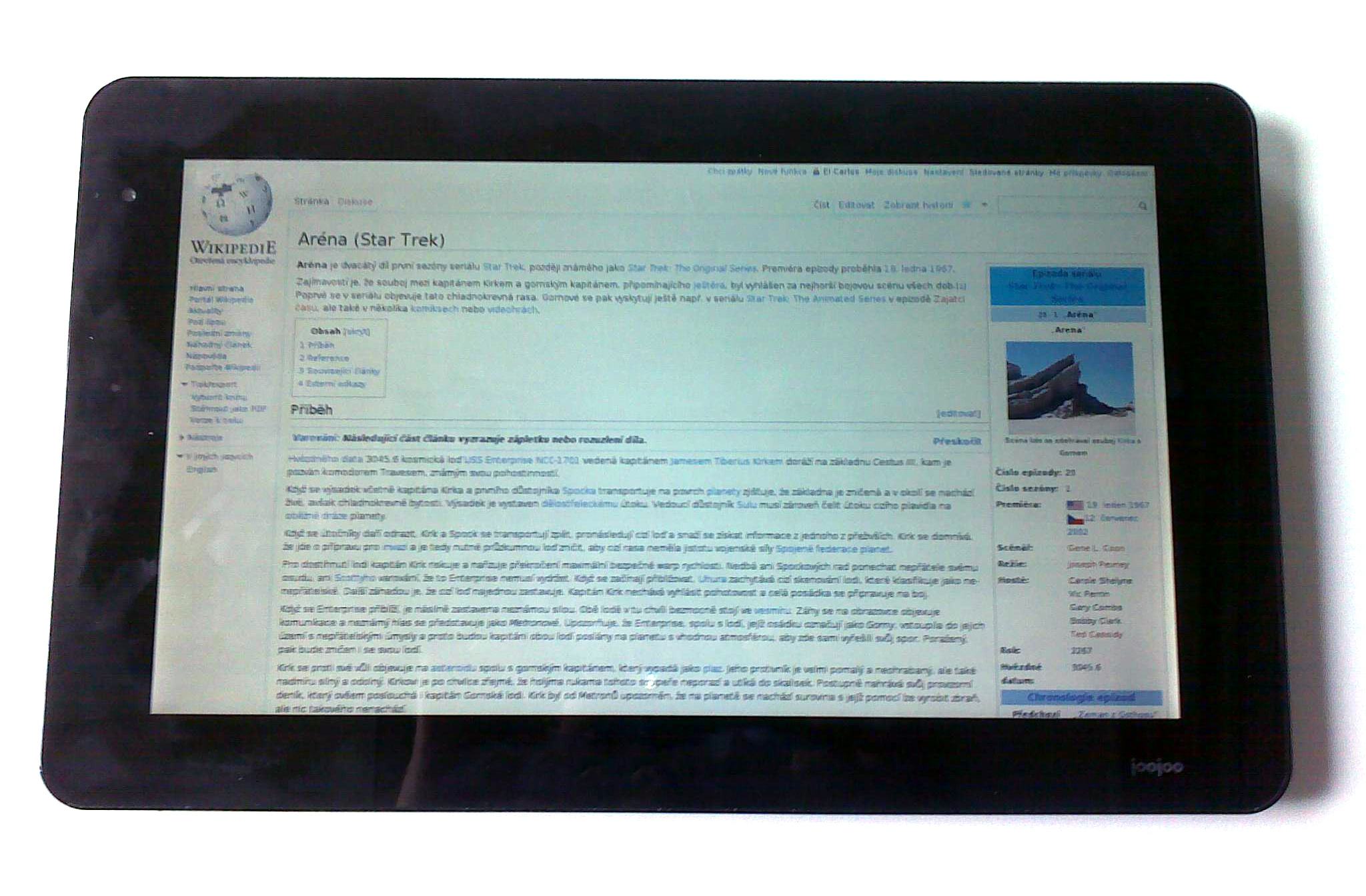
JooJoo

The JooJoo was conceived by TechCrunch founder Michael Arrington, who in a 2008 blog post envisioned "dead simple Web tablet" that would cost about $200. Originally named the CrunchPad, the tablet was produced by Singapore-based Fusion Garage, headed by CEO Chandra Rathakrishnan. However, despite the prototypes' positive feedback from the media, the Arrington–Rathakrishnan partnership would hamper the device's development, with Arrington canceling plans for the tablet and Fusion Garage renaming it the JooJoo and raising the retail price to $499. While more expensive than a typical netbook, Rathakrishnan claimed that the original pricing was unrealistic. Eventually, the feud culminated in a lawsuit against Fusion Garage, further delaying the tablet's launch until March 29, 2010, as the official release date, although the legal battle hindered actual shipping for a few days. Meanwhile, Apple's widely anticipated iPad, formerly considered a competitor of the JooJoo, was launched on April 3 the same year for the same price, undercutting Fusion Garage's innovative edge over Apple.

The JooJoo was panned by reviewers upon release. PC Magazine called it a "woefully overpriced" "device that's essentially a Web browser trapped under a huge touch screen", and Engadget criticized the performance and short battery life as a result of the combination of the device's Intel Atom processor and Nvidia Ion chipset. Although its Adobe Flash support was seen as an advantage over the iPad, both publications criticized the device's poor responsiveness to user input and the generally frustrating user experience. A court document from the lawsuit revealed that only 90 preorders for the tablet were made, of which 15 were canceled. As of late April, the JooJoo reportedly sold only 64 units, and on November 19, it was discontinued. Due to its abysmal performance critically and in the marketplace, the JooJoo was named by PC Magazine as one of "The Biggest Hardware Flops of All Time".

==== Microsoft Kin (2010–2011) ====
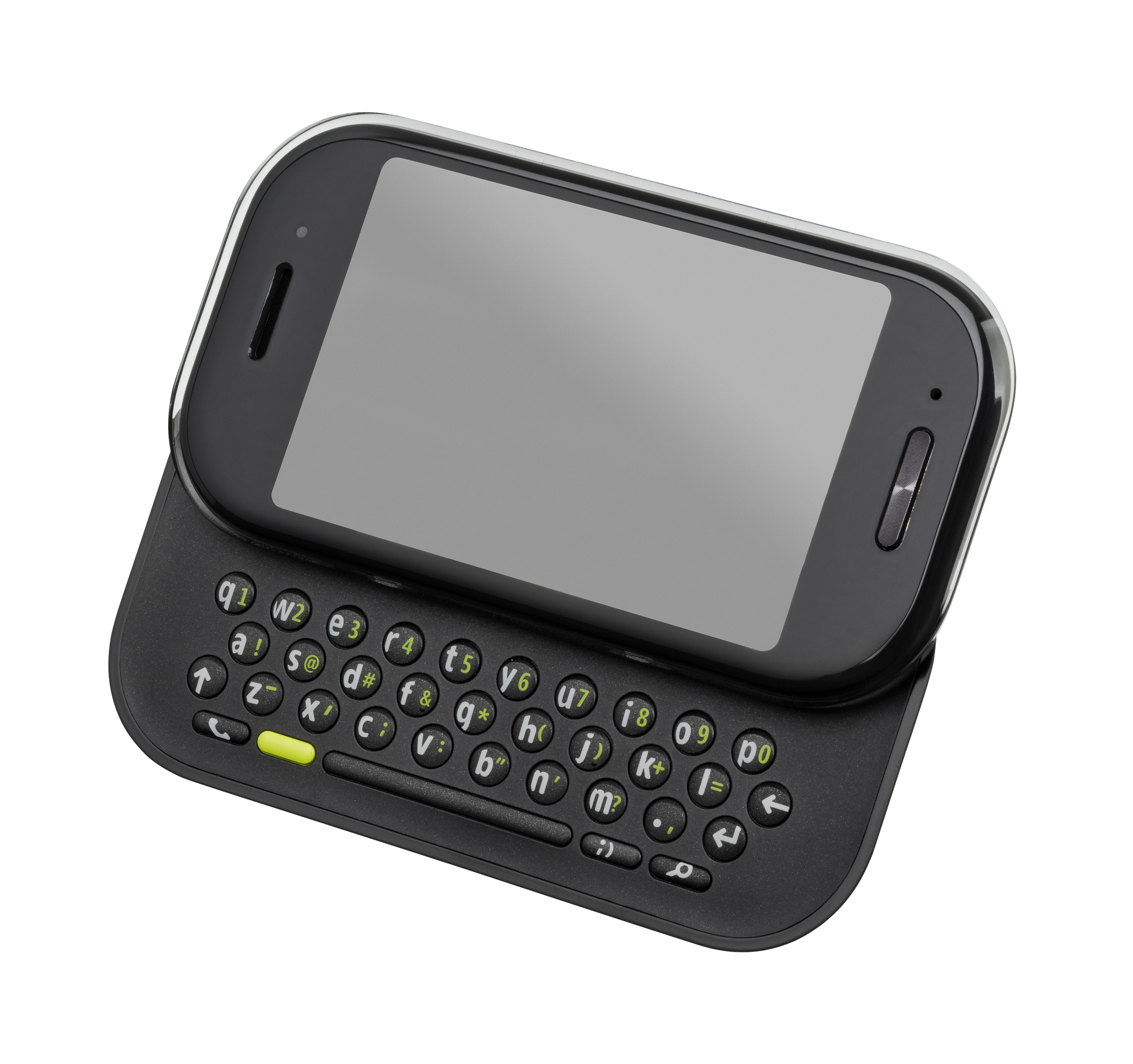
Microsoft Kin

Kin was a short-lived line of mobile phones created by Microsoft executive J Allard. Microsoft acquired Danger, Inc., known for the T-Mobile Sidekick, and its cloud computing intellectual property for $500 million in 2008 to kick-start its project. Kin's development was stunted by corporate politics between Allard and senior vice president Andy Lees, who was spearheading the development of what became Windows Phone 7. The two teams were separate, and Allard sought an original phone that would not share the same basis as Lees' project. However, Lees was reportedly jealous of Kin and probably concerned that it was distracting the Windows Phone team and diverting its resources. After enough pressure, Lees took the reins of Kin's development, and Allard's influence over the project dwindled considerably.

Under the auspices of its new leadership, Kin was redesigned from the ground up in keeping with Windows Phone. As a result, the phone was delayed a total of 18 months before being finally released on May 6, 2010, exclusively through Verizon Wireless. Marketed as a "chic" device toward teenagers and young adults, it was available in two models, Kin ONE for $50 and Kin TWO for $100, with 4 GB and 8 GB of storage, respectively, and data automatically backed up in the cloud—innovative for a phone at the time. While a desktop application called Kin Studio garnered unanimous praise, the devices themselves were criticized for the quality and quantity of built-in software and the mandatory $30 monthly data plan from Verizon, which PC World described as "appalling" and "hard to swallow". The devices were also seen as not true smartphones, given the inability to download third-party applications and games. Kin failed to take off commercially, with estimates of sales below 10,000 units, and Microsoft halted both models' production on June 30. Along with the negative reception, Microsoft's confusing attempts to distinguish the KIN OS from the platform of then-upcoming Windows Phone 7 and the company's mistake of not touting the device's automatic backup feature were cited as some of the factors for the poor sales. Later that year, Verizon relaunched the phones, now rebranded ONEm and TWOm, as feature phones, with a modified operating system and improved software, but they did nothing to recover the brand's sales, and in August 2011, the models were discontinued.

==== HP TouchPad (2011) ====
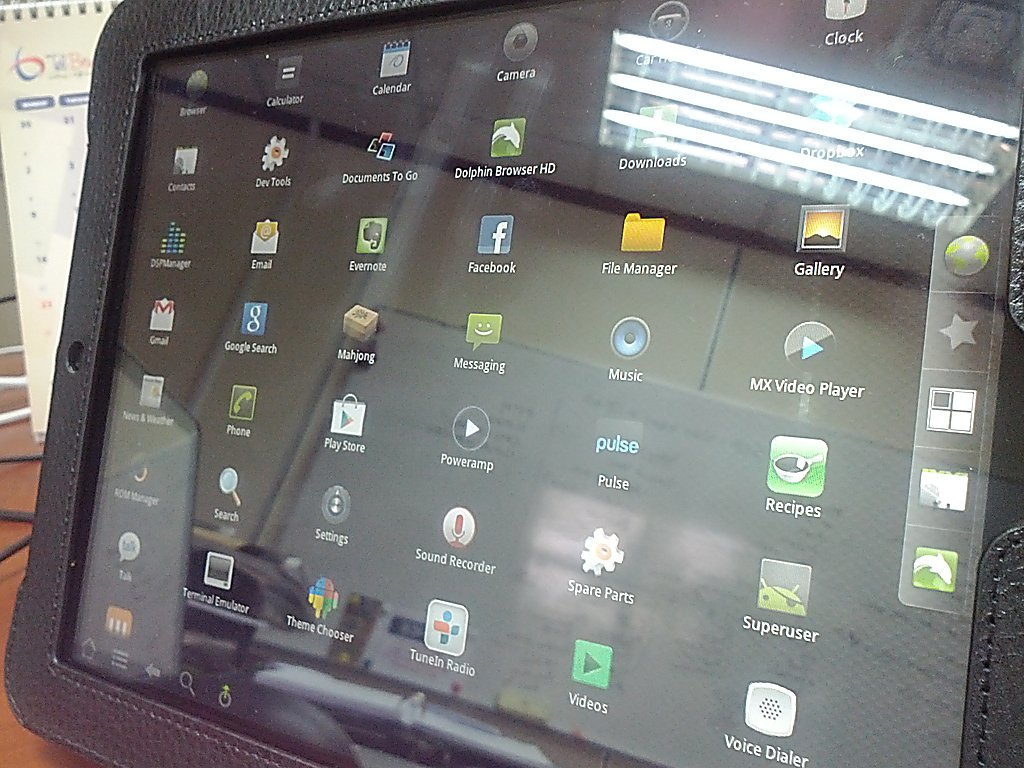
HP TouchPad

The HP TouchPad is a tablet computer designed by Hewlett-Packard. The TouchPad's development began after HP acquired Palm, Inc., known for its personal digital assistants, for about $1.2 billion in July 2010. The tablet was announced in February 2011, with HP insisting a March release, but Palm pushed back, citing that the TouchPad barely functioned, and it was ultimately launched on July 1 that year. The TouchPad was soon recognized as a commercial failure, with tablets reportedly piling up at Best Buy stores and the electronics chain sending some back and refusing new deliveries. Its introductory prices of $499 and $599 for models with 16- and 32 GB of storage, respectively, compared to those of the iPad 2 and the bugs found in the tablet's webOS 3.0 operating system were cited as reasons for the failure. HP attempted to lure customers with a rebate program, a weekend-only discount, and finally a permanent $100 price decrease in a single week in August, all of which proved fruitless. The company discontinued the TouchPad on August 18—just 48 days after it was launched, with Best Buy reporting only 25,000 of the 270,000 units in its stock. Hours later, a fire sale was held for the 16- and 32 GB models for $99 and $149, respectively. This resulted in the TouchPad quickly selling out, with 350,000 units reportedly sold in the first 24 hours. According to an NPD Group report published in November, the TouchPad became the best-selling non-iPad tablet in the United States in the first ten months of 2011, accounting for 17 percent of the 1.2 million tablets sold there. Nevertheless, for the fiscal year of 2011, HP wrote off $885 million in assets and another $755 million in costs of pulling out of the webOS market.

==== Fire Phone (2014–2015) ====
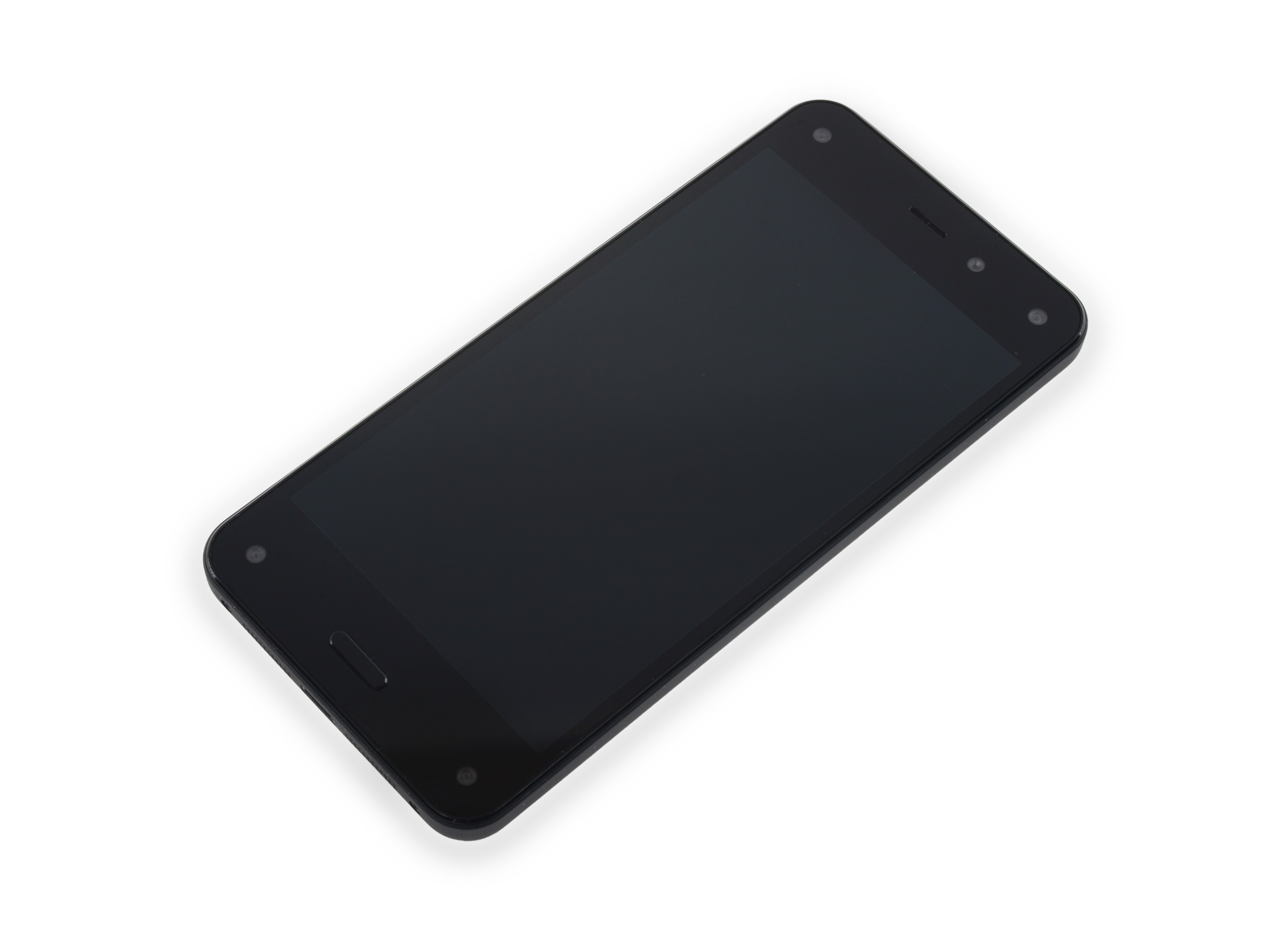
Fire Phone

The Fire Phone was Amazon's first smartphone. As of June 2024, it remains Amazon's only smartphone. The company touted the Fire Phone's Dynamic Perspective and Firefly features. Dynamic Perspective uses the phone's four cameras to detect where the user is looking to apply a 3D effect to perspectives and gestures, and Firefly is a virtual assistant that can identify around 100 million products, including those sold by Amazon, using the phone's sensors. Launched on July 25, 2014, the Fire Phone was available with 32 GB of storage for $649.99 (equivalent to $883 in 2025) or 64 GB for $749.99, the prices of which were reduced by $450 if purchased with a two-year AT&T contract.

The Fire Phone received a lukewarm response from reviewers, who praised the free one-year subscription to Amazon Prime and the company's Mayday feature, which offers technical support, but criticized the phone's battery life, low amount of available software, and poor hardware design, which Farhad Manjoo, writing for The New York Times, described as "gimmicky". The phone was also seen as lacking incentive for iPhone and Samsung Galaxy users to buy one. The phone failed commercially, with Amazon writing down $170 million on unsold units and The Guardian estimating that only around 35,000 units were sold a month after it was launched, and the phone's price with the AT&T contract was reduced to just 99 cents by September. Amazon discontinued the Fire Phone on September 8, 2015.

==== Samsung Galaxy Note 7 (2016) ====
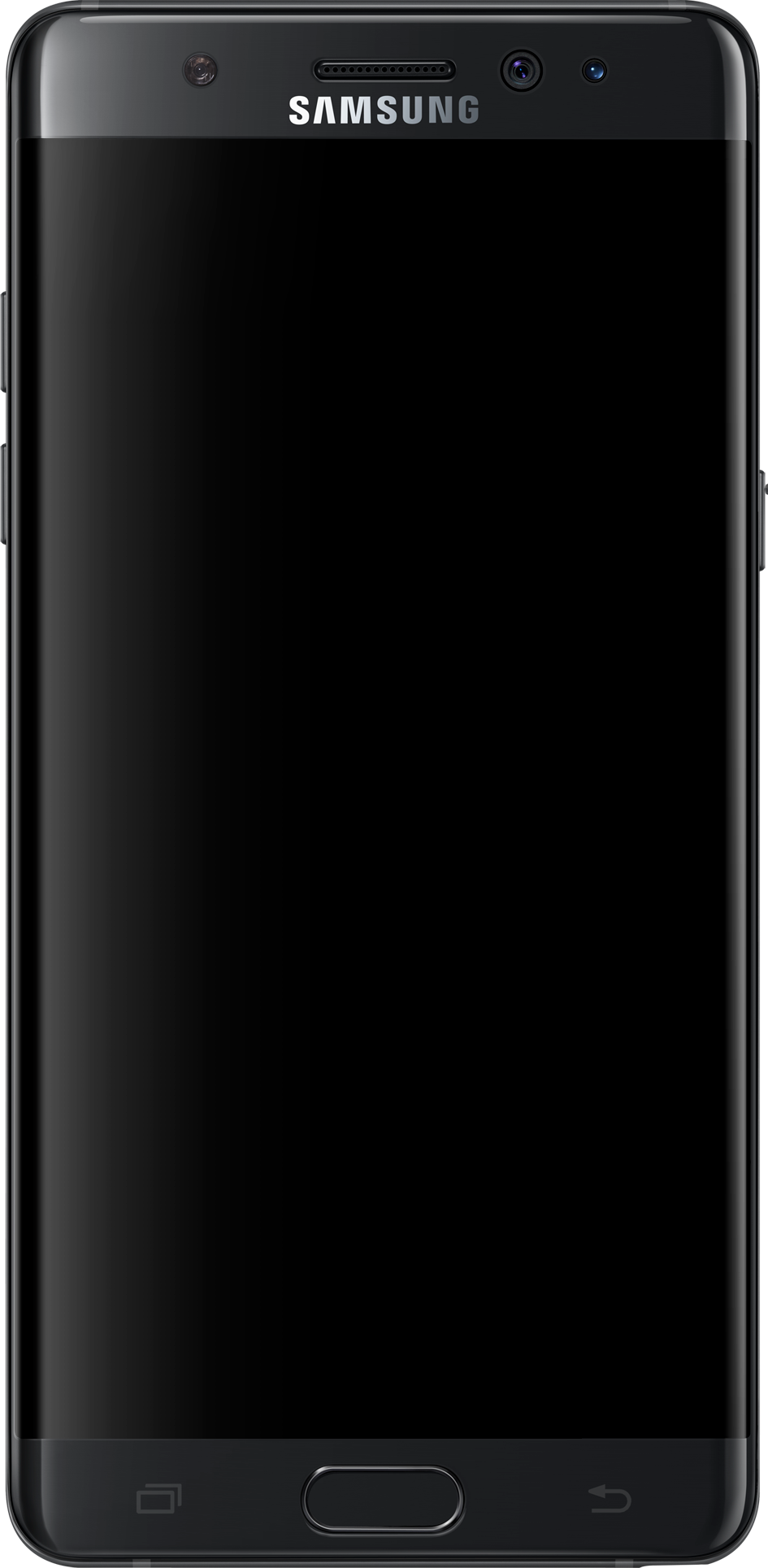
Samsung Galaxy Note 7

The Samsung Galaxy Note 7 was the sixth main device in Samsung's Galaxy Note line of Android phablets. A high-end smartphone, it featured a 5.7 in (14 cm) screen and a stylus. The Note 7 was unveiled to critical acclaim before its August 19, 2016, launch, with reviewers lauding the design and ergonomics and a screen that was larger and sharper than that of Apple's iPhone 6s. The device's retina scanner, waterproofing, and rear-facing dual cameras were also praised, as was the lithium-ion battery's capacity, which, at 3,500 mAh, allowed up to 36 hours of constant use without recharging.

However, the praise and enthusiasm soon dissipated in the wake of numerous reports of the phones catching fire, in some cases exploding. Samsung halted production on September 2 as the company scrambled to send replacements and the news of the incidents wiped $26 billion off of the company's stock value. The problem, as an internal investigation concluded in January 2017 determined, was a defect in the batteries of the first batch of phones, which had been manufactured by Samsung SDI. The upper right corner of the battery's casing left too little room for the negative electrodes, leading to the electrodes being bent in each of the 200,000 recalled devices tested and stressing the insulating separator placed between the positive and negative electrode foils. The negative electrodes were also found to be too long, and the batteries of some units had too thin separators. If the separator failed, the battery would short-circuit, causing catastrophic thermal runaway. By September 21, retail stores began exchanging replacement devices containing batteries now supplied by Amperex Technology, and sales of the Note 7 resumed, but reports of the devices also catching fire began to surface. The January investigation found that the replacements' batteries, due to poor welding, had burrs on the positive electrode that would scrape the insulation tape and the separator, and some units were missing insulation tape, both rendering the devices prone to the same catastrophic failure. On October 11, 53 days after the Note 7 was launched, Samsung recalled 2.5 million units—the largest in smartphone history—and permanently discontinued production.

The fiasco was estimated to cost Samsung $17 billion. Airlines across the United States, Asia, Europe, Australia, and New Zealand moved to ban the devices from flights. Due to a reputation for combusting that has overshadowed its popularity, PC Magazine names the Note 7 as one of "The Biggest Hardware Flops of All Time".

== Software ==
=== Lotus Jazz (1985–1988) ===
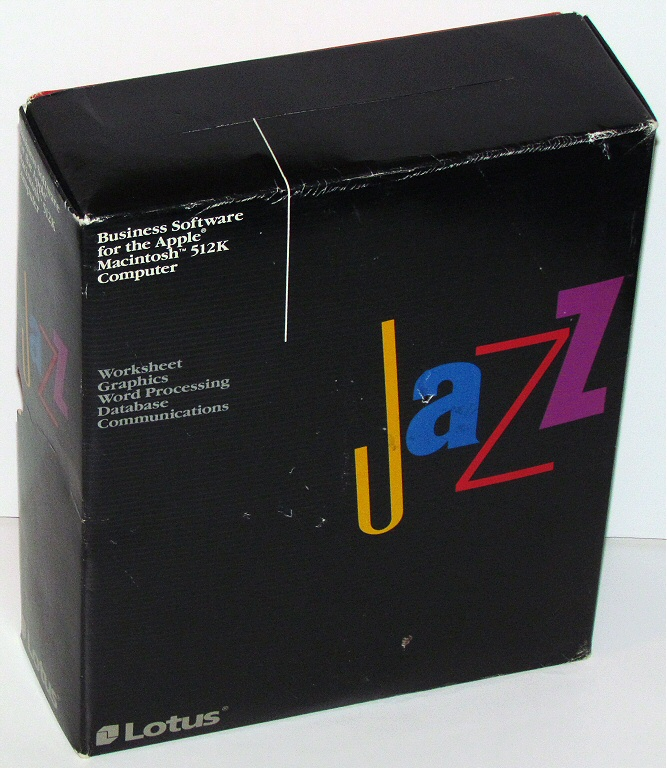
Lotus Jazz package

Apple Computer's Macintosh debuted in January 1984 after a well-received introduction, but struggled to see widespread adoption by businesses. Apple sought a "killer application" that could boost the Macintosh's stagnant sales. When Lotus Development Corporation, known for its Lotus 1-2-3 spreadsheet application, itself considered the killer application for the IBM PC, announced Lotus Jazz in November, Apple CEO John Sculley, who was present at the product's introduction, hailed it as "strategically significant for Apple", calling it "a very important day for, obviously, Lotus—but also for Apple and the industry". Jazz is a productivity suite similar to Lotus Symphony for MS-DOS that was bundled with a word processor, a spreadsheet program, a database manager, a graphics editor, and telecommunications software. The software package was planned for a March 1985 release, but ended up shipping in August, selling for $595 (equivalent to $1,781 in 2025).

Unlike Lotus 1–2–3, Jazz's performance in the market was lackluster, capturing only 9 percent of the Macintosh software market compared to the top-selling software in February 1986, Microsoft Excel, with 36 percent of the share. By April, the company had sold only 42,000 copies. The sales were partly attributed to the high pricing and the failure of Lotus Development to use the 1-2-3 brand. The suite's reception was also poor. PC Magazine summed up the product as "a klutzy multifunction program that fell well short of Lotus's reputation for fast, innovative highly functional software". The software's use of copy protection was also criticized. Lotus Development co-founder Mitch Kapor admitted that Jazz was an "overly ambitious" project plagued with bugs that took the team longer to develop than expected. An update, called Lotus Modern Jazz, was planned for a 1988 release, but Lotus Development canceled it later that year. PC Magazine listed the original Jazz as one of "The 20 Biggest Software Flops of All Time".

=== Microsoft Bob (1995–1996) ===
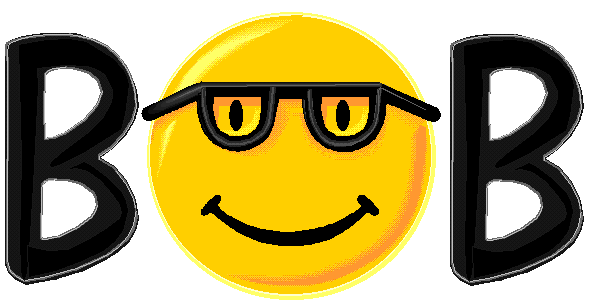
Microsoft Bob logo

Microsoft Bob was a Microsoft software package that provided a graphical interface for users of Windows 3.x. Designed to make using Windows simpler, the software replaced the Program Manager and its pull-down menus and icons with a house in which one of 11 cartoon characters, the default being Rover the dog, guided the user with instructions inside speech balloons. The rooms consisted of objects that could be clicked on to run one of eight programs. For example, clicking on a piece of paper would allow the user to type a letter.

Microsoft touted Bob as the first kind of a social interface, and many analysts predicted that the interface's style could supplant the desktop-and-folders one invented by the Macintosh. Despite early praise for its presentation, Bob received generally negative reviews, with reviewers criticizing the room style of the interface, the guides, the lack of customizability and manual, high system requirements, and practicality. Stephen Manes, writing for The New York Times, ended his review by referring to the product as a "toy". The apparent lack of an embargo on reviews between January and Bob's March 31 release negatively affected product sales; by early 1996, when Bob was discontinued, only about 58,000 copies were ever sold, compared to about 2.75 million licenses of Windows 95 sold in its first month, according to PC Data.

Microsoft Bob is remembered as the application that the Comic Sans font was designed for (but was ultimately left out of) and for the debut of the characters Clippy, an anthropomorphic paperclip, and Rover. Comic Sans would later be bundled with Windows, and Clippy and Rover would reappear as assistants for Microsoft Office versions 97 to 2003 and Windows XP's search feature, respectively. Time named Bob and Clippy as two of "The 50 Worst Inventions", calling the former an "expensive and overly cutesy" piece of software that was "designed around Clippy". PC World ranked the product No. 7 on its list of "The 25 Worst Tech Products of All Time" and Complex No. 27 on its list of "The 50 Worst Fails In Tech History".

=== Windows Phone (2010–2017) ===
Logo used for Windows Phone 8 and 8.1

Windows Phone is a discontinued mobile operating system that debuted in October 2010 as a major update for and succeeding Microsoft's earlier Windows Mobile, which itself has roots in the Windows CE-based Pocket PC. Appearing first as Windows Phone 7 after as much as about six years in the making, Windows Phone entered the market with stiff competition from Apple's iPhone and Google's Android. The operating system stood out from its rivals in its use of a simplified design language called Metro and also in grouping related applications into "hubs" intended to display and allow for important information and tasks without the need to switch between applications constantly. Reception of Windows Phone 7 was mixed, with reviewers praising the operating system's interface design, but criticizing the lack of basic features found in the iPhone and Android, such as copy-and-paste, custom ringtones, and tethering. Third-party applications were also limited by the available APIs and the multitasking extremely so, and the pace at which Microsoft added the missing features in updates further exacerbated user frustrations. However, Windows Phone's prospects were drastically improved a year later when Nokia, then the world's largest smartphone manufacturer, released the first of its Nokia Lumia phones, the 710 and the higher-end 800, both with the Windows Phone 7.5 update installed; the update and the devices were received more favorably compared to the original Windows Phone at launch, though there were concerns regarding the price of the phones. Even so, Windows Phone consistently trailed Android and iPhone in shares of the smartphone market, peaking in its lifetime at just 3.6 percent in the third quarter of 2013, according to Gartner.

In late 2012, Microsoft released an upgrade called Windows Phone 8, now based on the Windows NT kernel (the same as Windows 8 and Windows RT) supporting multi-core CPUs, near-field communication, microSD cards, and high-definition screens and making important software improvements such as a more customizable Start screen and the ability to capture screenshots. Notable devices using the new operating system include the Nokia Lumia 520, which remains the best-selling Windows Phone device, and the Nokia Lumia 1020, known for its 41-megapixel camera. As with its predecessor, Windows Phone 8 received mixed reviews upon release, with users again criticizing the lack of basic features such as a screen rotation lock and custom notification sounds and the pace at which said features would be added in updates—a common critique that the Windows Phone family had come to endure— as well as the dearth of third-party applications on launch and the incomplete feel of the operating system. A major update, Windows Phone 8.1, was released in April 2014, introducing a plethora of new features and improvements, among them a Swype-style keyboard, which briefly held a Guinness World Record for the fastest onscreen keyboard, and a widely anticipated virtual assistant called Cortana. Meanwhile, Nokia continued to expand its share of the Windows Phone market such that, by September 2013, the Lumia phones had overwhelmingly dominated Windows Phone sales. Nevertheless, the Finnish phone manufacturer was designing and selling the phones at a loss, and Nokia was planning the launch of low-cost phones running a forked version of Android, threatening Microsoft's mobile ambitions. Microsoft acquired Nokia's phone business later in April 2014 in a deal worth about $7.2 billion. However, in July, Microsoft announced the biggest layoffs in company history, affecting 18,000 people, of whom over two-thirds had just joined following the Nokia acquisition. The following year, Microsoft was also forced to write off $7.6 billion—more than the entire cost of the acquisition—and lay off a further 7,800.

The last major iteration of Windows Phone, Windows 10 Mobile, was released in early 2016, adding support for Universal Windows Platform apps, which are cross-compatible with Windows devices and Xbox One. It also featured Continuum, an application that provides a desktop-like interface for users who connect their devices to a keyboard and a mouse, and then to a display. Still, developers saw little incentive to support the mobile operating system, and the Windows Phone devices continued their downward trajectory. While Microsoft posted revenue of $1.397 billion for its hardware in the third quarter of fiscal year 2015, that figure plunged to $735 million the next year before collapsing to just $5 million the year after. On October 8, 2017, Microsoft vice president of operating systems Joe Belfiore tweeted that the company would end mainstream support for Windows Phone, due to its low user base. According to IDC, shares had dwindled to a mere 0.1 percent by March 2017. The last update, version 1709 for Windows 10 Mobile, arrived on December 10, 2019. Due to the operating system's eventual inability to eat into the iPhone's and Android's market dominance, The Verge considers Windows Phone overall to be a failure.

== See also ==
- List of commercial failures in video games
- Osborne effect
