= Project MyWorld =

Unreleased video game

Project: MyWorld
- Developer(s): Realtime Worlds, eeGeo
- Designer(s): Sean Dugan
- Platform(s): Microsoft Windows, Android, iOS
- Release: 01/03/2013
- Genre(s): Casual

Project MyWorld is a 3D mapping SDK (software development kit) that started as a video game developed by Realtime Worlds. When Realtime Worlds closed in September 2010, Project MyWorld was sold to Kimble Operations (formerly known as Newincco 1027) for less than £3 million. The head of interactive media at Revolver PR believed that it could have been worth "hundreds of millions of pounds."

== News ==
Project MyWorld was announced on 28 July 2010 with the launch of a teaser trailer. The video states that the game will be launched in 2011. Even after sale notice, Project MyWorld's official website went down in late 2010. It has not been seen since. In May 2011, Kimble Operations (now renamed once again, to eeGeo) announce that Project MyWorld will be shown in upcoming weeks.

It has been renamed as Mapply, and then again as Recce (slang term for reconnaissance) after a dispute with a French company named 'Mappy'.

The main focus of eeGeo is providing Recce as a 3D mapping SDK for other apps to be built upon.

== EeGeo Management ==
Eegeo's own website lists Hassan Sadiq as its current (December 2015) chairman, along with Ian Hetherington as CEO.
