= VTech Laser =

VTech Laser was the name used by a number of personal computers released by the company Video Technology (VTech) during the 1980s, including:

- VTech Laser 50, an educational portable computer
- VTech Laser 200 and Laser 210, low-end Z80-based personal computers
  - VTech Laser 100 and Laser 110, the closely related predecessors to the Laser 200
  - VTech Laser 310, an enhanced version of the Laser 200 and 210 computers
- VTech Laser 500 and Laser 750, a later Z80-based personal computer, not compatible with the Laser 200 family
- VTech Laser 128, an Apple II clone released in 1986
- VTech Laser 2001, a 6502-based computer based on the VTech CreatiVision console
