= Athena 1 (computer) =

1983 laptop

- Developer: Athena Computer & Electronic Systems
- Manufacturer: Athena Computer & Electronic Systems
- Type: Laptop
- Released: February 1983; 43 years ago
- Media: Solid-state media
- CPU: National Semiconductor NCS-800 (×2)
- Memory: 16 KB RAM
- Dimensions: 14.5 by 11 by 3.375 inches (36.83 by 27.94 by 8.57 cm)

The Athena 1 was an early laptop computer released in 1983 by Athena Computer & Electronic Systems, an American computer company active from 1982 to 1987 and based in San Juan Capistrano, California. The Athena 1 was one of the first laptops to make use of solid-state technology as its primary storage medium.

== Specifications ==
The Athena1 contains an internal RAM drive of between 128 KB and 1 MB, depending on the configuration ordered, made up of 16 KB dynamic RAM chips. The Athena 1 features dual NCS-800 microprocessors; the NCS-800 was a second-source CMOS variant of the Zilog Z80 processor manufactured by National Semiconductor designed for minimal power draw. As these chips were somewhat more expensive, Athena resorted to using RAM chips fabricated using the more power-hungry NMOS process. One of the NCS-800s handles input/output, while the other serves as the laptop's central processing unit. Besides the RAM drive, the Athena 1 also contains 512 KB of RAM, originally 64 KB. The unit contains spare room internally for expansion circuit boards that would have connected to the existing motherboard via an expansion bus socket. The designer, David Mitchell, had eyed a 16-bit processor upgrade as one such circuit board in the early days of the laptop's development.

Mitchell designed the Athena 1 with no internal floppy drive, as was common for portables at the time, to keep the laptop relatively lightweight at 15 pounds (6.8 kg). His company offered an external 5.25-inch floppy drive as an optional peripheral. Some of the laptop's weight comes from the internal lead–acid battery, which has a maximum rated capacity of two hours. The laptop measures 14.5 by 11 by 3.375 inches (36.83 by 27.94 by 8.57 cm) and sports an off-white plastic outer shell. Mitchell commissioned the Key Tronic corporation of Spokane, Washington, to design and manufacture the laptop's grey and black keyboard. He meanwhile purchased the laptop's display panels from Epson, LCDs capable of displaying 80 columns and 4 fours. Athena was beaten to market by NEC Home Electronics' NEC PC-8201 which featured an 8-line LCD panel. Mitchell expressed wanting to upgrade the Athena 1's LCD panel to that of the PC-8201 before it released to market. The Athena 1 was ultimately released with the 4-line display in 1983, although Mitchell hinted at a retrofit upgrade kit featuring a 16-line LCD for release in November 1983. This never came to pass, however, and instead Mitchell promised an upgraded version of the Athena 1 with a 16-line display, as well as the kit, for 1984.

The CP/M 2.2 operating system, a JRT Pascal interpreter, Chang Labs' Profit Plan spreadsheet application, and the MiniVEDIT text editor are all included on the laptop's internal 12 KB ROM chip. Mitchell eschewed from shipping the Athena 1 with the BASIC programming language, instead opting for JRT Pascal, as he felt the latter was so ubiquitous that most purchasers of his laptop would already have it. The Athena 1's BIOS supports connecting up to 15 other machines together using the laptop's built-in dual-RS-232 serial ports; the laptops also house one parallel printer port.

In the first quarter of 1984, Athena released an upgrade kit for the laptop which housed a Harris 80C86, the CMOS version of Intel's 8086 microprocessor. This kit gave the laptop the ability to run application software programmed for MS-DOS. As well, the kit came packaged with a copy of MS-DOS itself. The kit in practice made the computer a tri-processor machine based on two platforms, CP/M and MS-DOS. According to computer journalist Michael Nadeau, this kit was the first use of a CMOS version of the 8086 in a laptop.

== Development and release ==
David Mitchell of San Juan Capistrano, California, founded Athena Computer & Electronic Systems in June 1982. Mitchell set out the company to design a high-end portable computer "for the discriminating [user]", delivering a prototype of his computer to the press just eight months after incorporating his company, in February 1983. Named the Athena 1 (or Athena I), the laptop was one of the first to incorporate solid-state storage as its primary means of operation and data storage.

Athena Computer & Electronic Systems dissolved in 1987, having only released the Athena 1.

== See also ==
- MicroOffice RoadRunner
