= Teleram =

American computer company

Teleram Communications Corporation
- Type: Public
- Industry: Computers
- Founded: December 1973; 52 years ago in Mamaroneck, New York
- Founder: Charles J. Satuloff
- Defunct: November 1985; 40 years ago
- Fate: Bankruptcy liquidation (Chapter 7)
- Products: Portable computers; Portable video display terminals

Teleram Communications Corporation was an American computer company that manufactured one of the first portable video display terminals and some of the earliest portable computers during the 1970s and 1980s. Founded in December 1973 by Charles J. Satuloff and based in Mamaroneck, New York, the company was established to build portable terminals for newspapers that would allow journalists to compose and edit stories in the field and transmit them electronically to newsrooms.

The company's first product, the P-1800, featured a small cathode-ray tube display, a Selectric-style keyboard, and a built-in acoustic coupler that allowed users to transmit text over standard telephone lines. Housed in a chassis described as a "small blue suitcase", the P-1800 became a staple for major news organizations, most notably The New York Times and Los Angeles Times, which began using the terminals en masse in 1975. Later product lines included the Portabubble, named after its use of bubble memory for data storage.

As the market for portable computers exploded in the early 1980s, Teleram introduced its first general-purpose computer, the T-3000, in 1983; it was a battery-powered, Z80-based portable computer featuring an LCD and running the CP/M operating system. Despite going public in the same year and attempting to further compete in the burgeoning portable and laptop markets, the company struggled with intense competition from larger manufacturers such as Radio Shack, whose TRS-80 Model 100 cost far less than Teleram's similar offerings. Teleram eventually filed for bankruptcy and ceased operations in November 1985.

== History ==
=== 1973–1980 ===
Charles J. Satuloff (1929–2022) founded Teleram Communications Corporation in December 1973 in Mamaroneck, New York. Satuloff, a native of Brooklyn, was a graduate of the United States Military Academy where he studied computer engineering, telecommunications and electronics. The class of 1951, he graduated during the beginning of the Korean War, in which he served with the 45th Infantry as a unit of the Signal Corps until the end of his service in 1954. During the 1950s, he got married and landed a job at Westinghouse Electric Corporation as an international salesman. In 1961 he formed Cane Technical Services, a dealer and sales representative of computers and electronic instruments, from the attic of his home in New Rochelle. He later moved the company to Mamaroneck along the Boston Post Road before finally settling the company on Mamaroneck Avenue.

The genesis for Teleram came when the specifications for a device allowing journalists to compose, edit, and submit articles to their newsrooms electronically were drafted and submitted by the American Newspaper Publishers Association and The New York Times to various computer firms. Four companies including Cane Technical Services delivered their proposals to ANPA and the Times in 1973; in the end, only Satuloff's proposal was accepted. He incorporated Teleram in December to develop and market the product behind his proposal, headquartering the company in Mamaroneck while also opening a 9,000-square-foot factory in Denville, New Jersey. In February 1974, Satuloff and his team delivered the first working prototype of Teleram's first product, a portable video display terminal that also doubled as a word processor with scratch RAM and a cassette interface for saving documents. He demonstrated the prototype to the ANPA, The New York Times, and the Los Angeles Times, to great interest and immediate orders. The product was named the P-1800 and announced to the public in May 1974. Mass production of the P-1800 commenced in July 1974, and general availability was achieved the following September.

The Teleram P-1800 is a portable terminal measuring 18 by 13 by 7 inches (46 by 33 by 18 cm) and weighing 32 pounds (15 kg). Its exterior chassis was described by The New Yorker as a "small blue suitcase". It contains a seven-inch cathode-ray tube for editing and communications functions and a Selectric-style keyboard with various function keys, including scrl, home, del word, del char, close, open, and insrt. The terminal's scratchpad memory allows 2,048 characters to be stored at a time; when this is used up, the preceding portion of the article is automatically saved to cassette tape via the built-in tape deck. Each cassette can store up to 170,000 characters. The CRT monitor can display up to 616 characters simultaneously, adjacent segments scrolling smoothly into view from memory via the move of a cursor. The P-1800 allows characters to be inserted mid-sentence, moving the rest of the paragraph to the right as new words are typed. The keyboard's function keys allowed characters, lines, and paragraphs to be deleted instantaneously. Once a document is composed, the user can remote into a mainframe by placing a telephone on the P-1800's acoustic coupler, dialing that mainframe's phone number, and prompting the terminal to transmit the document through the coupler. A 750-word document was said to take a little over two minutes to transmit. In terms of power supply, the P-1800 had an optional built-in battery pack; it also accepted input from wall power and lead–acid car batteries.

The New York Times began using the P-1800 en masse for its reporters around June 1975. Within the next few years, the product saw adoption by the Los Angeles Times, the Louisville Courier-Journal, and the South Bend Tribune, among other newspapers. In April 1978, The New Yorker purchased a 35-percent stock interest in Teleram, representing an undisclosed dollar figure. It was the first time in the publication's history that it had made any investment in an outside company or engaged in any business outside of magazine publishing. The following month, the company announced a revised version of the portable terminal and two desktop models that they had been developing over the years since the P-1800.

=== 1980–1985 ===
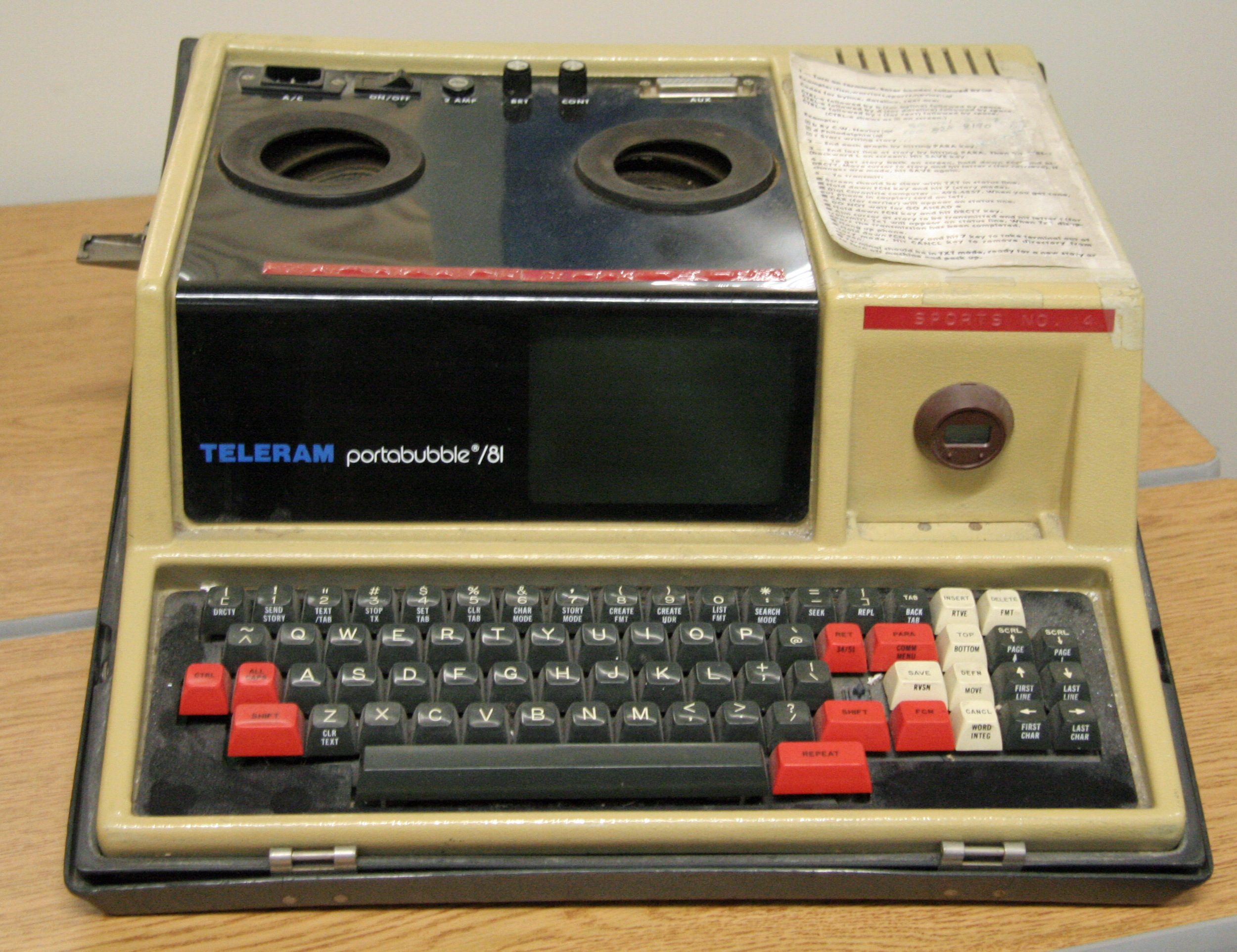
Teleram Portabubble/81

Between late 1979 and early 1980, the company was embroiled in a minor dispute with the International Printing and Graphic Communications Union (IPGCU) Local 406 and Newsday magazine. The latter had suspicions of high RF emissions coming from Teleram's Model 2277 terminal, which was produced by an outside OEM. While tests from an independent contractor deemed the terminal safe for normal use, Newsday demanded Teleram outfit the newsroom's terminals with metal shrouds to reduce interference. Teleram begrudgingly acquiesced, and another independent test a month later also determined that the terminal was free of excessive RF emissions, a test Newsday was satisfied with. However, they failed to inform the IPGCU, who had been overseeing the dispute between the two companies, of the latter conclusive test, before the IPGCU had raised the issue of safety around Teleram terminals with several national publications. As the IPGCU had mentioned Newsday in their debriefings with the newspapers, some of the newspapers called the magazine for clarification. Newsday brought up the safe readings from the latter test, leading most newsrooms to drop the issue. Even after this, however, the union and Newsday pressed Teleram to manufacture more aftermarket safety shields for their existing terminals, which they offered for US$40 each.

In 1981 the company expanded its Mamaroneck headquarters, leasing another 3,200-square-foot building from Schulman Reality Group. In the previous year Teleram had introduced the first in its Portabubble line of portable terminals, starting with the Portabubble/81 (also known as the TM/81). It weighed only 15 pounds (6.8 kg) and shrunk the diagonal screen size of its predecessors' CRTs down to 5 inches. The TM/81 increased the working memory of its predecessors to roughly 20,000 characters; it cost roughly $5,000. As the name suggests, the Portabubble/81 uses bubble memory, a form of non-volatile data storage.

Teleram boasted 500 organizational customers across the globe in 1983, including the United States, Europe, Canada, and Australia. To keep up with the exploding portable computer market in the early 1980s, that year the company introduced its first general-purpose computer with the Teleram 3000 (T-3000). It was a battery-powered portable computer running off a CMOS Z80 microprocesor and possessing an LCD capable of displaying 4 lines of 80-column text. In development since May 1982 and introduced in February 1983, the T-3000 weighed only 9.75 pounds (4.42 kg); like the Portabubble/81, it uses bubble memory. In March that year, the company relocated their manufacturing plant from Denville to Randolph, New Jersey, purchasing a modern plant 30,000 square feet in area, triple the footprint of its predecessor. Teleram began volume production of successor portable terminals in April 1983, securing agreements with a litany of dealers representing $10 million worth of orders. They came to fruition in November 1983 as the T-4000 and the T-5000, the former featuring an eight-line LCD and the latter a 16-line, 80-column LCD, in November 1983. The company's only other contemporary competitor in this segment was Epson and their HX-20.

Teleram went public in mid-1983, filing its initial public offering with the SEC with a registration statement filed by Laidlaw, Adams & Peck. For the third quarter of fiscal year 1983, the company reported a loss of $259,000 on revenue of $4.7 million, which Satuloff ascribed to operating costs associated with manufacturing the company's T-3000 portable. The company announced their intentions to acquire Franklin Electronic Publishers, a California-based manufacturer of microcomputers and peripherals, in September 1983, part of an attempt to expand its product lines and attempt to ease losses. The deal was called off in November 1983, however. In the aftermath of the failed merger, Teleram announced heavy discounts on their terminals the following week. The company was able to recover from its slump before the end of 1983, reaching record sales of $5.4 million and peak employment of 110 that year.

In May 1984, the company announced a store-and-forward networking system by the name StarLink. It comprised a Z80-based computer running Teleram's own Data Storage System server software, with data being stored onto an array of hard disk drives. StarLink could be accessed from any Teleram terminal, with multiple users able to access the disk array simultaneously. Teleram aimed StarLink at news organizations, allowing them to deliver drafts to copyeditors and typesetters remotely as well as pass along email.

Also in May 1984, they secured exclusive rights from Dulmont Electronic Systems of Australia to distribute the latter's PC-compatible Dulmont Magnum laptop in the United States. Dulmont went under administration in fall 1984, leaving Teleram with no more Magnums to sell. Teleram themselves began buckling under financial pressure, caused by competition with the IBM Personal Computer and especially the Tandy Corporation's TRS-80 Model 100. The latter, released in 1983, was a battery-powered portable word processor and microcomputer with a form factor resembling Teleram's own offerings but for much less cost. Satuloff admitted to a sharp drop in sales from 1983 in an interview with Gannett Westchester in 1984; the company by that point had reduced its payroll down to 32 employees, 12 of which were staffed from their Mamaroneck headquarters. In August 1984, it reported $2.9 million in assets and $1.3 million in liabilities.

Despite gaining Reuters as a customer in 1985, Teleram's financial situation had deteriorated so badly that it was forced to file Chapter 11 bankruptcy in September 1985. Under massive debt to creditors, a judge converted the Chapter 11 bankruptcy to Chapter 7 the following November, effectively dissolving the company. After Teleram folded, Satuloff founded Channel Group, Inc., a computer system and hardware dealer that also provided repairs and replacement parts for the existing base of Teleram customers. Channel Group later purchased part of the rights to StarLink from Teleram's shareholders.

== See also ==
- Computer Transceiver Systems, Inc., competing portable teletype manufacturer based in New Jersey
