= Column inch =

Unit of content in published works

A column inch was the standard measurement of the amount of content in published works that use multiple columns per page. A column inch is a unit of space one column wide by 1 inch (25 mm) high.

== A newspaper page ==
Newspaper pages are laid out on a grid that consists of a margin on 4 sides, a number of vertical columns and space in between columns, called gutters. Broadsheet newspaper pages in the United States usually have 6-9 columns, while tabloid sized publications have 5 columns.

== Column width ==
In the United States, a common newspaper column width is about 11 picas—about 1.83 inches (46 mm)—though this measure varies from paper to paper and in other countries. The examples in this article follow this assumption for illustrative purposes only.

== Column inches and advertising ==
Newspapers sell advertising space on a page to retail advertisers, advertising agencies and other media buyers. Newspapers publish a "per column inch" rate based on their circulation and demographic figures. Generally, the more readers the higher the column inch rate is. Newspapers with more affluent readers may be able to command an even higher column inch rate. For most newspapers, however, the published rate is just a starting point. Sales representatives generally negotiate lower rates for frequent advertisers.

Advertisements are measured using column inches. An advertisement that is 1 column inch square is 11 picas wide by 1 inch high. The column inch size for advertisements that spread over more than one column is determined by multiplying the number of inches high by number of columns. For example, an advertisement that is 3 columns wide by 6 inches high takes up 18 column inches (3 columns wide multiplied by 6 inches high).

To determine the cost of the advertisement, multiply the number of column inches by the newspaper's rate. So, if a newspaper charges $10 per column inch, the cost for the advertisement discussed above would be $180.00 (18 column inches multiplied by $10.00). Advertisements that span over more than one column also gain a small amount of extra space in between columns because they stretch across the gutters. Gutters are the empty space between columns. Gutters range from about 10 points to about 1 pica wide. In addition, most newspapers charge for an extra column if an advertisement is a double truck.

=== Terminology ===
In the newspaper industry, ad and newsroom staffers will refer to an advertisement's size by saying "it's a (column width) by (inch height) ad," replacing the words in parentheses () with a single figure. This can be confusing because it refers to two distinct measurements as if they were measured with the same unit. Normally one would think a 3 by 6 advertisement would be 3 inches wide by 6 inches high — but in reality it's actually about 5.5 inches wide by 6 inches high. In writing, an "×" is usually used to separate the two figures. Whether written or spoken, most, if not all, newspaper professionals understand the first figure is the column width and the second figure is the inch height.

Nowadays, most newspapers and magazines have converted to a "modular" system that simplifies ad size and eliminates the need to figure out column inches. In a modular system ad sizes are represented by the amount of the total page the ad takes up. For example, 1/2 page, 1/4 page, 1/8 page, etc. This has been a popular system among many newspapers because it simplifies the layout process (i.e. less ad sizes to fit in newspaper) and makes pricing much easier for an advertiser to understand.

== Use and number of words ==
Column inches are also used as an ad hoc estimate of the importance of a news story and are also used to tell how much copy a reporter should write or has written, and how much should be cut from a story to fit the available space. This harks back to the days of the late 19th century linotype machine and its relatively uniform newspaper column-widths, echoed in the phototypesetting and paste up days of the late 20th Century, when typeset newspaper stories were still printed on long strips of paper one-column wide, then pasted into page layouts. Even when pages were designed using various wider column widths, story lengths were still estimated "as if" set in the standard narrower columns. Correspondents, for example, might be paid "by the inch" for their stories, and some organizations explained their nickname Stringer (journalism) as originating when regular-width columns of set type were measured with lengths of string.

The software used in most present-day newsrooms still measures column inches to give reporters and editors an estimate on how much space a story will take up on a page. Reporters usually refer to story lengths in inches, which actually refers to how many column inches a story takes up. Although it varies, it is generally agreed upon that there are 25-35 words in a column inch.

Newsroom staffers also measure items such as photographs and infographics using column inches.
