= Epson PX-8 Geneva =

Laptop computer

Epson PX-8
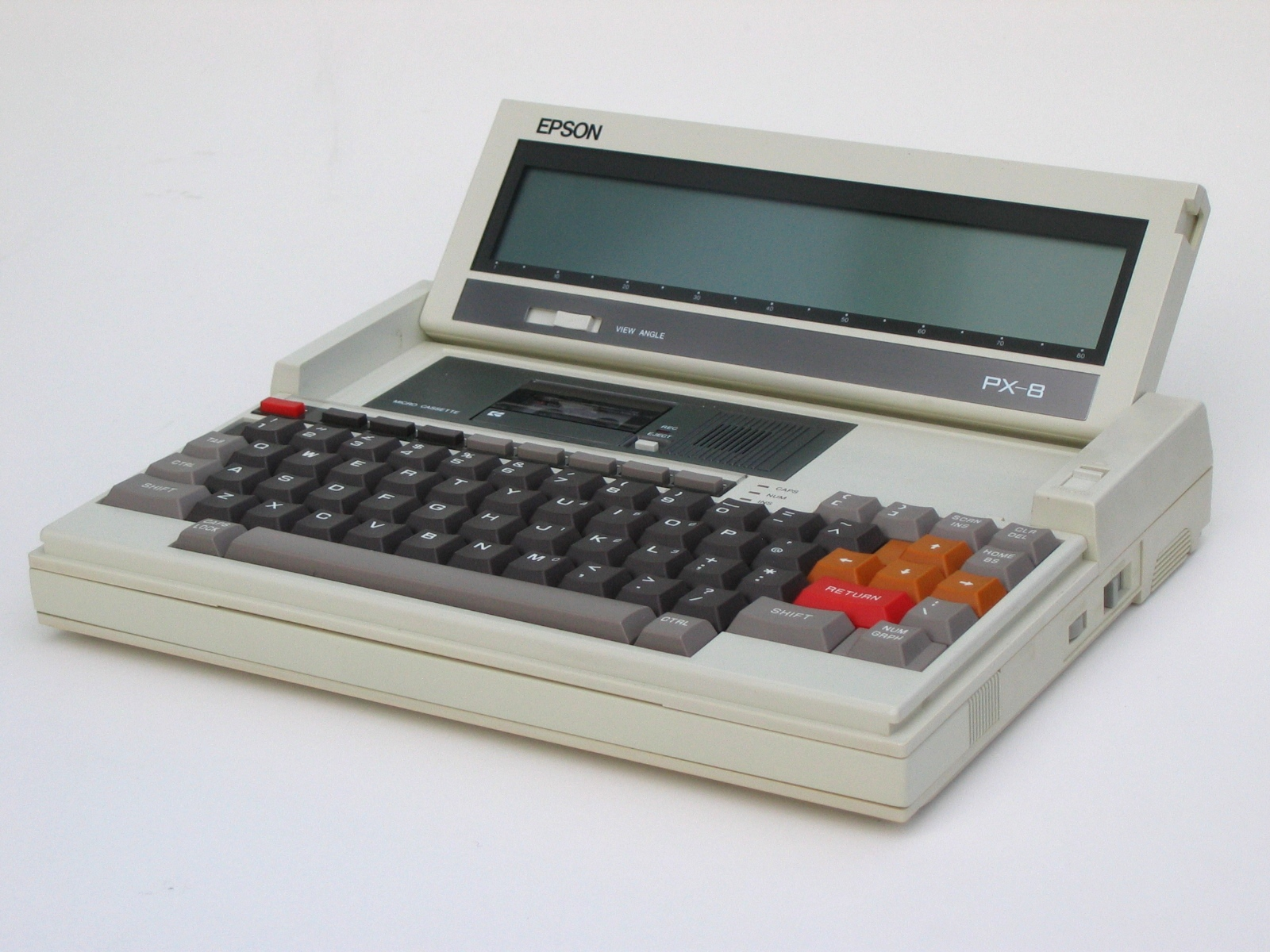
- The Epson PX-8
- Also known as: Geneva
- Manufacturer: Epson
- Type: laptop
- Released: 1984; 42 years ago
- Operating system: CP/M-80
- CPU: Z80 compatible
- Storage: built-in microcassette drive
- Removable storage: 2 x ROM sockets, External RAM disk
- Display: Monochromatic non-backlit 80 column by 8 line LCD
- Successor: PX-4

The Epson PX-8 a.k.a. Geneva was a small laptop computer made by the Epson Corporation in the mid-1980s.

It had a Z80-compatible microprocessor, and ran a customized version of the CP/M-80 operating system as well as various applications from a pair of ROM sockets which were treated as drives. For file storage, it had a built-in microcassette drive. The microcassette drive is integrated into CP/M as a disk drive, default designation H:.

The PX-8 did not have an internal disk drive, and instead allowed either memory to be partitioned into application memory and a RAM disk, or an external 60 KB or 120 KB intelligent RAM disk module to be attached (64K and 128K internally but some used for the processor). The intelligent RAM disk module had its own Z80 processor with a backup battery.

The PX-8 had an 80 column by 8 line LCD, which was monochromatic and non-backlit. It used an internal nickel-cadmium battery, and had a battery life in the range of 6–8 hours when using word-processing software. An additional battery provided backup for the internal RAM.

There were a number of proprietary accessories available including a portable printer, bar code reader, and an early 3.5-inch diskette drive, the PF-10. The disk drives from the HX-20 could also be used. For the ROM cartridge slots a number of applications were available: Basic, CP/M utilities, Portable WordStar, CalcStar, Scheduler, dBase II and Portable Cardbox-Plus.

The PX-8 was not initially a commercial success, especially compared against the TRS-80 Model 100 portable computer but achieved some increased success after a large number were sold discounted in the United States through the DAK Catalog. The PX-8 combined some of the features from its predecessors, the HX-20 being portable, battery-operated and the QX-10 being CP/M compatible.

In 1985, Epson introduced the PX-4, combining features from both the PX-8 and the HX-20.

== Reception ==
BYTE in February 1985 called the PX-8 "a good second computer, especially for people with CP/M systems" or WordStar users. The magazine approved of its documentation and tape storage, and described the display as "acceptable" but less legible than the Model 100's. BYTE concluded that "after the disappointment of the Epson HX-20, the Geneva PX-8 represents a giant improvement. It is, at this time, the most powerful 8-bit portable available".
