= Children's Discovery System =

Educational handheld game console

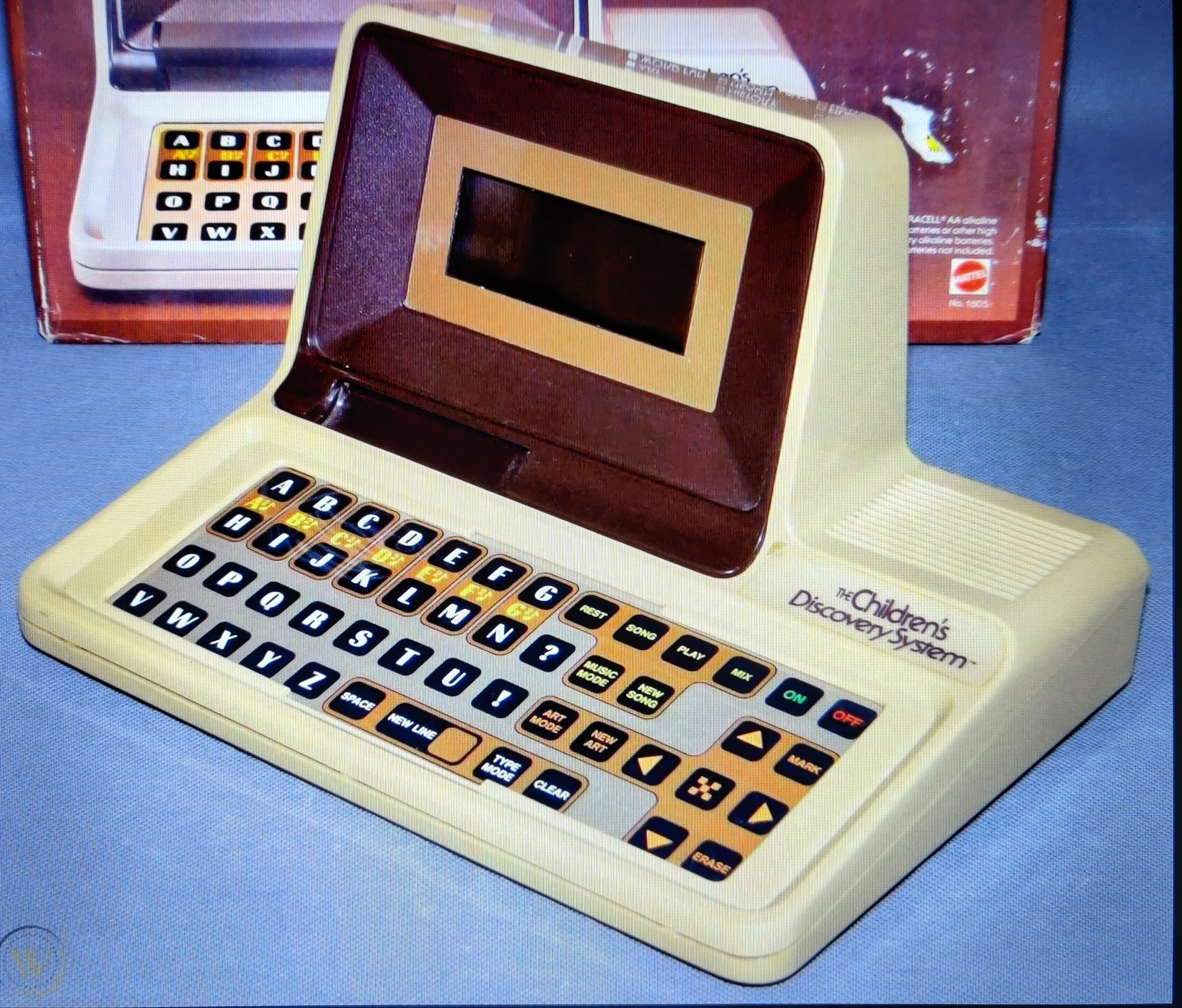
- Manufacturer: Mattel
- Generation: Second
- Released: September 1981
- Discontinued: 1984
- Media: Learning Module ROM cartridges
- Memory: 2k RAM
- Display: LCD 16x48
- Input: Membrane keyboard

The Mattel Children's Discovery System is an early electronic educational toy product released by Mattel in 1981. The Children's Discovery System was targeted toward children aged 6 to 11 and mimicked the look of a contemporary consumer-grade computer.

== History ==
The system was developed by Mattel with the help of UCLA professor Dr. Gordon L. Berry, who was chief educational consultant on the project.

It was announced at the American International Toy Fair in February 1981 and released later that year around October. The system cost around $125 at launch.

One review noted how small the screen resolution was, which limited it severely, and how slow the system was to start up. The included game modes on the console were also criticized: the type mode did not provide feedback on its word games, music mode was described as "pointless" due to its simplicity and that the music is represented by letter graphics instead of notes. The art mode, however, was praised for being a good introduction to computer graphics, although the process of drawing pixel-by-pixel was described as tedious.

In September 1982, a marketing campaign was initiated with celebrity endorsement from the Smothers Brothers, claiming that the system could make parents "Get a smarter kid in 60 days. Or your money back", with purchase of the system and two modules made from September 1 to December 31, 1982. In May 1984, Jell-O had 1000 units as part of a prize pool for a sweepstake until June 30. In the Fall of 1984, Mattel liquidated the remaining 8000 units and learning modules to DAK Industries, where they sold through mail order a bundle that included the console with 14 learning modules for $79, nearly the entire library of games. It later appeared in a Lionel Kiddie City sale in December 1985 for $29.91.

== Specifications ==
The Children's Discovery System used a 16-by-48 matrix LCD screen and was powered by six size AA alkaline batteries. The screen was much wider than it was tall, therefore only a grid of 8-by-2 text was possible, allowing for a maximum of 16 characters on-screen at any given moment.

The unit came preprogrammed with three modes: art mode, music mode and type mode. The Discovery System came with a specially laid-out membrane keyboard to better accommodate the built-in modes and also made use of keyboard overlays for use with expansion modules. Also included with the unit was a large activity book with over 100 suggested learning activities specially-tailored for the Discovery System.

== Expansion module cartridges ==
Besides the three included modes on the console, one could buy other game cartridges with different games. Each cartridge is numbered from 1 to 21, and all have the Discoveries in ---- Learning Fun Module name, where the ---- is the name of the actual game and what is written on the cartridge. Each module has several different modes for different games, and an age range depending on the content.

Although the system was advertised alongside 21 different modules since the beginning, all 21 were not ready at launch, with only 8 titles available by late 1982. Others were developed and released at later dates. It is currently unknown if all the modules were even developed or released.

Each box is a different color, and collecting them together creates a color gradient with the spines. Photos of different children are used in the front of each box.

Background shading indicates the color of the box and number on the spine of each game.

#	Code	Age range	Fun module	Game modes listed in the box
1	1606	6–11	Math I	Calculator; Flash Cards; Math Quiz; Metric/U.S. Conversions
2	3349	6–11	Arcade Action I	Racers; Golf; Push Off
3	1607	6–8	Words I	Computerized word games with 4 fun ways to play!
4	1609	6–11	Art	Pixturir; Quik Pix; Copy That; Art Alive; Lock-N-Key
5	1608	6–11	Music	Create, play and learn music with a fun, computerized sound!
6	3346	9–11	Words II	Word games for the older child with 4 fun ways to play!
7	3731	6–11	Arcade Action II	Target action excitement in 4 computer arcade games.
8	3733	6–11	Memory And Logic	Secret Code; Memory Match; Patterns
9	3732	6–11	Geography I	Mystery Nation; Geo-Facts; Odd Nation Out; Info-Nations
10	3734	6–11	Foods	Pick A Food; Four Of A Kind; Peanut Butter Poker; Calories Count
11	5165	6–8	Fractions I	Fraction Counting; Name That Fraction; Action Fractions; Pinpoint The Fraction
12	3347	9–11	Fractions II	
13	3350	9–11	Science I	Planets; Space Weights; Rocket Lander
14	3835	6–11	Presidents	Presidential Facts; Mystery President; Presidential Order; Pick A President
15			Arcade Action III	
16	5329		Computer Programming	
17				
18	5328	9–13	Spelling Fun	Word Gin; 2-Player Word Gin; Secret Word; 2-Player Secret Word
19				
20				
21				

Other games/unknown number:

- Math Quiz/Calculator
- Nutrition
- (4456) US Cities
- (3347) History
- (3348) Sports
