= Epson PX-4 =

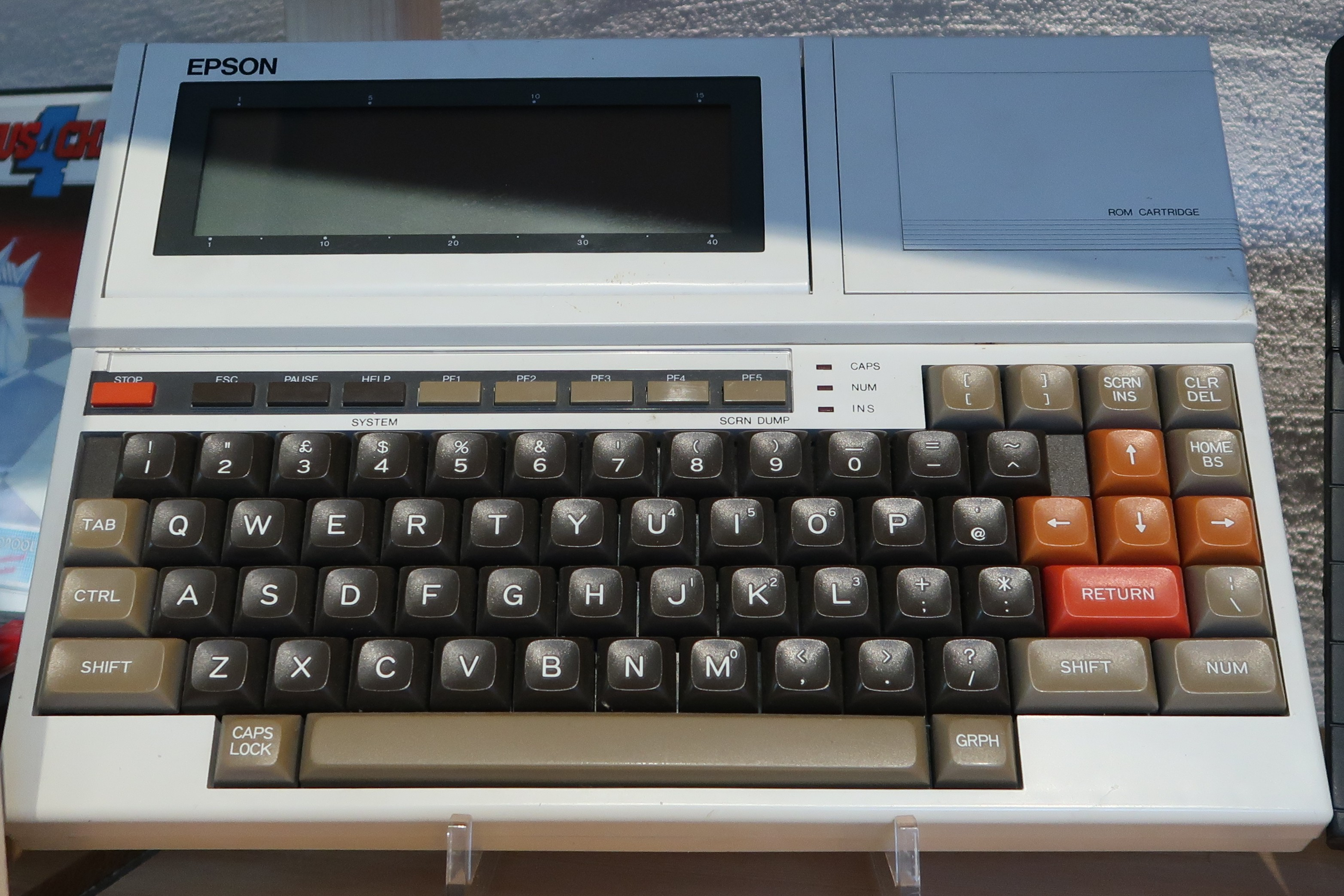
- The Epson PX-4
- Also known as: HC-40; HX-40; PX4-B; HC-41; HX-41
- Manufacturer: Seiko Epson
- Type: portable computer
- Released: 1985; 41 years ago
- Operating system: CP/M
- CPU: Zilog Z80
- Memory: 64K RAM
- Storage: Optional Microcassette cartridge
- Display: 40×8 characters
- Graphics: 240×64 pixels
- Power: Rechargeable nickel-cadmium battery pack (Epson RB 105), 4xAA batteries, or a 6V 600mA DC power supply
- Predecessor: Epson HX-20

The Epson PX-4 (HC-40 or HX-40) is a portable CP/M based computer introduced in 1985. The screen was 40×8 characters physical, but 80×25 or 40×50 virtual, making it almost compatible with the Epson PX-8 Geneva. It could be operated from a Nickel-Cadium battery pack (Epson RB 105), 4xAA batteries, or a 6V 600mA DC power supply.

It was targeted as successor of the Epson HX-20 portable, which was very popular with field engineers.

Another feature of the PX-4 was its high modularity. Inheriting the ROM capsules from the Epson PX-8 Geneva, it added a cartridge bay (similar but incompatible with the Epson HX-20), for which Epson offered several printers, micro-cassette drive, modem, EPROM writer, DMM (Digital Multimeter Module), RAM and ROM cartridges. Third parties could make custom cartridges. The modem, EPROM writer and DMM needed user programs. The system allowed for BIOS extensions (User BIOS). Other features were the Serial and RS232 port, barcode reader interface like with the Epson PX-8 Geneva. New were a cassette port and parallel printer port.

The keyboard was also easily replaceable, allowing country specific layouts but also custom layouts, like the 'item keyboard' turning the PX-4 into a cash register. This trend was taken further by the Epson PX-16 for which even 'item keyboards' with touch screens were available.

Internal RAM was 64K, of which a part could be reserved as RAM disk. An External RAM disk could be attached, creating a 120K RAM disk, leaving internal RAM as user BIOS and workspace.

The PX-4+ was an improved version which had the External RAM disk integrated (HX-45 in the US, HC-45 in Japan).
