= MicroOffice RoadRunner =

Portable computer

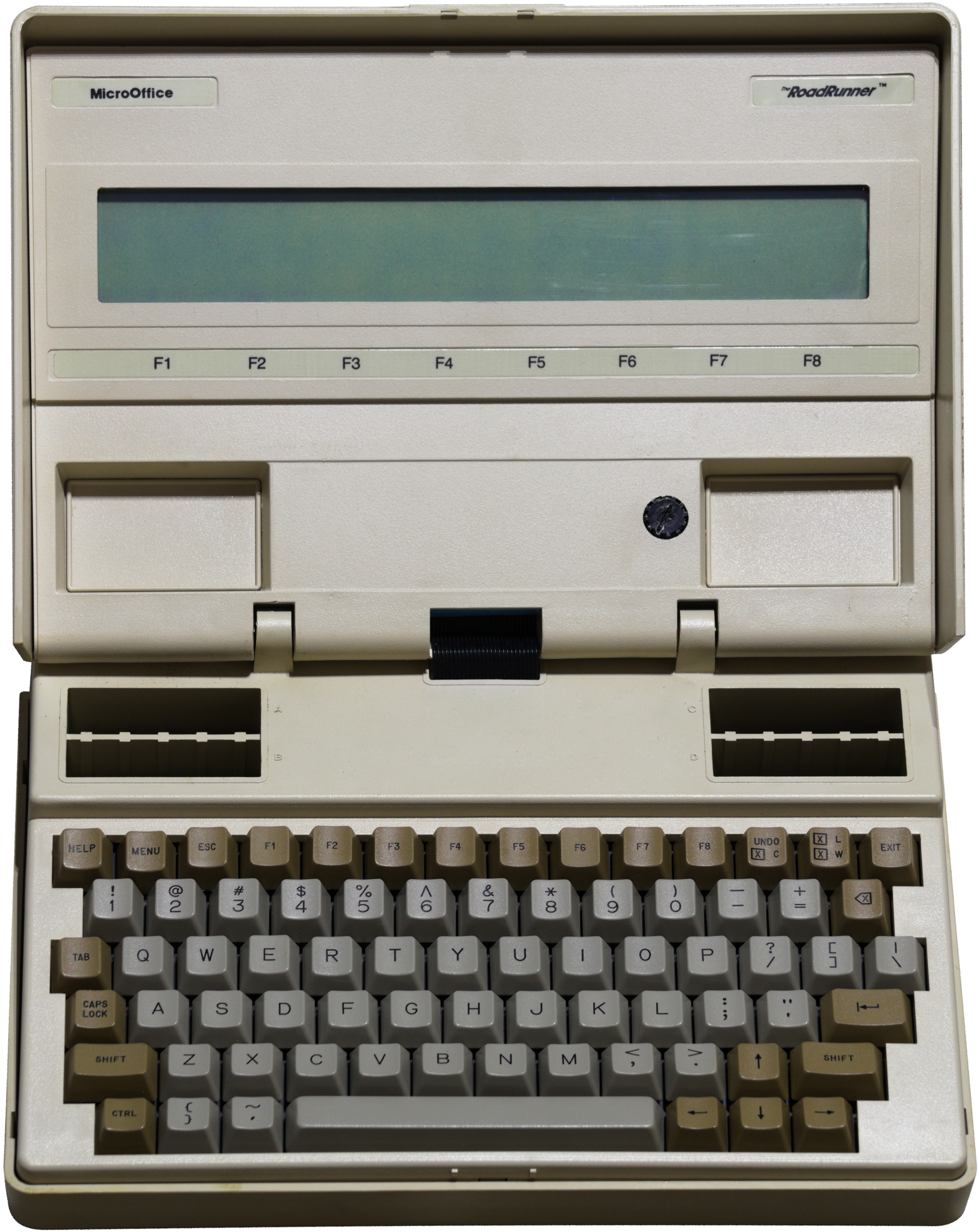
- Manufacturer: MicroOffice Systems Technology
- Type: Laptop (notebook)
- Released: November 1983; 42 years ago
- CPU: National Semiconductor NSC800D (Z80A-based), 2.5 MHz
- Memory: RAM: 48 KB (16–64 KB external, optional; 256 KB maximum); ROM: 16 KB
- Graphics: 480 × 64 directly-addressable pixels
- Dimensions: 11.5 by 7.8 by 3 inches (29.2 cm × 19.8 cm × 7.6 cm)

The RoadRunner (sold to OEMs as the MicroOffice 100) was an early laptop designed by MicroOffice Systems Technology and introduced in 1983. Weighing roughly 5 pounds (2.3 kg) and featuring a battery able to power it for up to eight hours, the RoadRunner was one of the first clamshell notebook computers ever released.

Instead of magnetic disks for fixed and removable storage, the RoadRunner relied on CMOS RAM and ROM cartridges for storing and loading data and software. The laptop was equipped with a CP/M-compatible operating system in its built-in ROM, as well as an address book and a scheduler that took advantage of the laptop's ability to keep time with its real-time clock. An external modem allowed it to communicate with a mainframe and wake-on-ring to submit data remotely and automatically. Primarily the brainchild of MicroOffice co-founder James P. Dunn, the RoadRunner was released in November 1983 to positive reception by computer journalists. It remained on the market until 1985 when MicroOffice was acquired.

== Specifications ==
The RoadRunner is a clamshell laptop measuring 11.5 by 7.8 by 3 inches (29.2 by 19.8 by 7.6 cm). The laptop's liquid-crystal display measures 9.3 by 1.3 inches (23.6 by 3.3 cm), with a resolution of 480 by 64 directly addressable pixels, or 80 columns by 8 rows of text. Text characters are formed by a 5 by 7 dot matrix with an additional row and column of dots separating characters. The dot-matrix letterforms feature no descenders. The laptop was built into a clamshell form factor both to protect the screen from abrasion and to allow for aftermarket display upgrades in the form of replacement display assemblies. (Note: Such replacement display assemblies promised a higher column count and were rumored to be in the works in February 1984 (Libes 1984, p. 36).) The display assembly itself is connected to a ratcheting hinge, allowing the user to pivot it at multiple oblique angles without the weight of the housing causing it to fall back entirely. The laptop overall weighs roughly 5 pounds (2.3 kg)—10 ounces (280 g) of which is taken up by the nickel–cadmium battery, which can power the RoadRunner for up to 8 hours. (Note: MicroOffice gave no specified time for recharging the RoadRunner, but they recommended that users recharge it overnight (Ahl 1984, p. 82).)

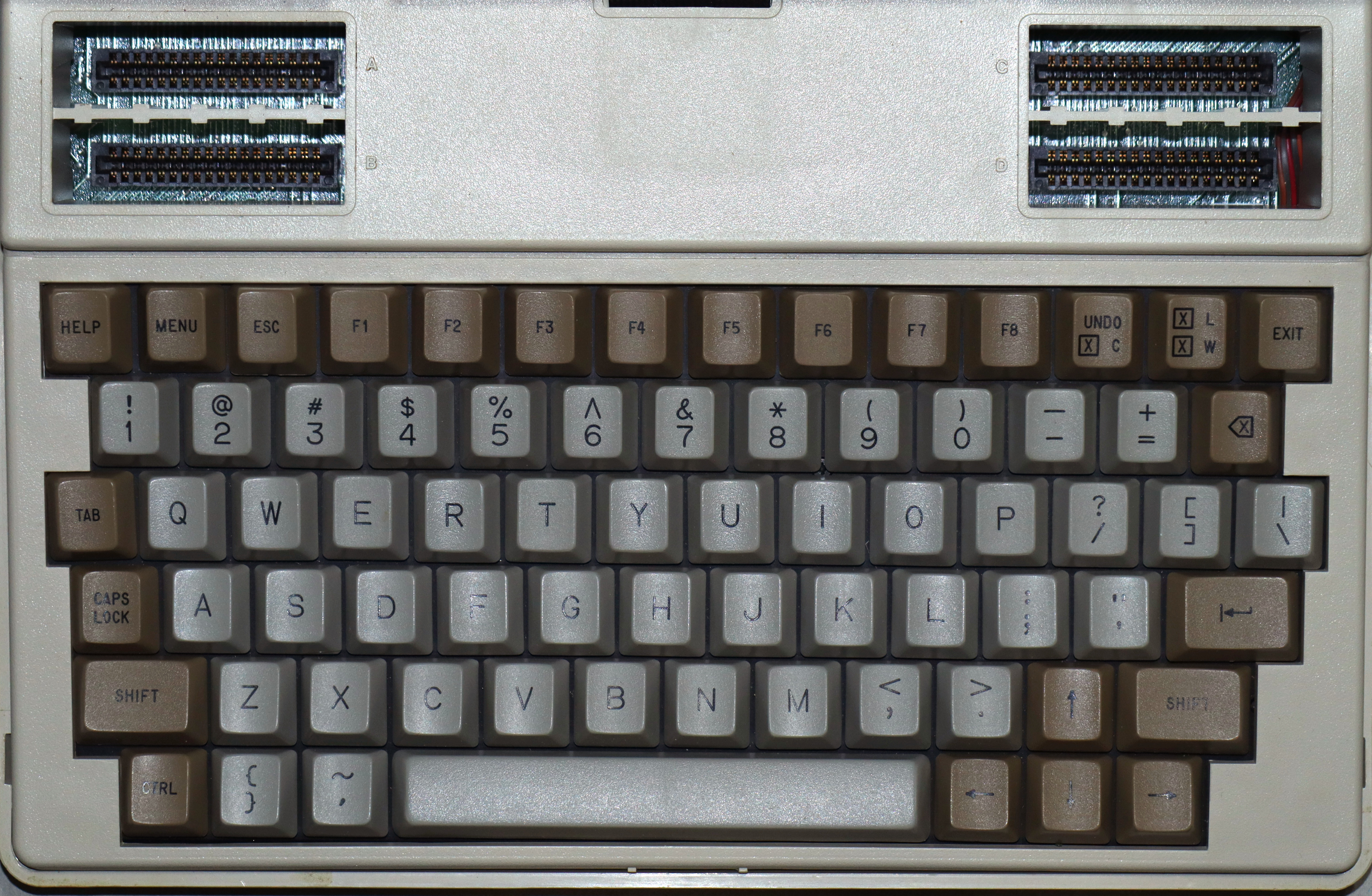
The RoadRunner's four cartridge slots reside above the laptop's 73-key keyboard.

The RoadRunner's keyboard sports 73 keys, 14 of which are reserved for function (colored light tan and dark tan, respectively). The key switches are full-travel and of the linear variety, while the keyboard layout is modeled after that of the IBM Selectric typewriter. The key caps are concavely sculpted and have a matte finish.

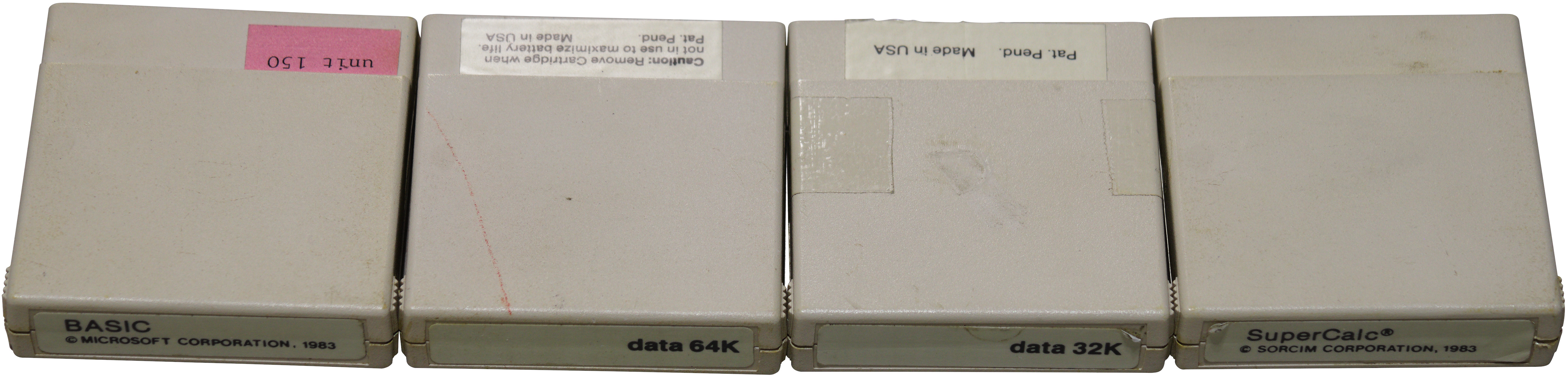
Four cartridges for the RoadRunner: from left to right: Microsoft BASIC, 64 KB and 32 KB static CMOS RAM cards, and Sorcim's SuperCalc

For a microprocessor, the RoadRunner uses National Semiconductor's NSC800D, a CMOS-based version of Zilog's Z80A processor, clocked at 2.5 MHz. The performance of the NSC800D was rated on par with NEC's PC-8201 portable. The laptop has 16 KB of built-in read-only memory, burned onto which is a custom implementation of version 2.2 of the CP/M operating system with added background printing capability; a phone book application; a basic text editor; a VT100-compatible terminal emulator; and a scheduler utility that takes advantage of the computer's real-time clock to alert the user of an event at a set time. The laptop also has 48 KB of on-board static CMOS random-access memory. Additional RAM can be added to the laptop in the form of cartridges inserted into any of the four slots above the keyboard, in 16 KB, 32 KB, and 64 KB varieties. These RAM cartridges can also be purposed by the laptop as RAM drives, each accessible by CP/M as drives A through D (as marked beside each cartridge slot). A lithium battery in each RAM cartridge keeps the contents of data intact for roughly five years. The RoadRunner supports a total of 256 KB RAM.

Besides RAM, the four cartridge slots allow packaged software cartridges to be loaded. Available at release was a version of Microsoft's BASIC, Sorcim's SuperCalc, and MicroOffice 100 Editor, a full-featured text editor with character–word–line delete and global find-and-replace. These remained the only software packages available for the machine for over a year after its release in late 1983. MicroOffice promised more in the coming months of 1985. At least one other company did deliver third-party software on cartridge for the machine: Distribution Management Systems of Milford, Connecticut, who became a distribution partner of MicroOffice and who developed an electronic mail client in late 1984. This email client was sold only to enterprise customers along with the entire computer, however.

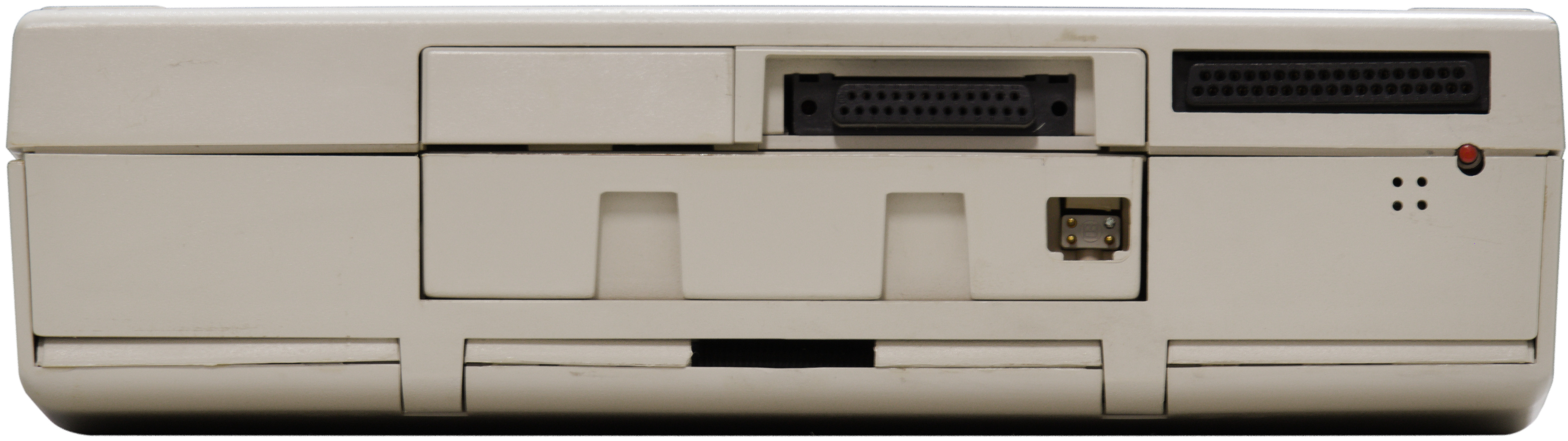
The back ports of the RoadRunner; top row (left to right): RS-232C serial, parallel bus; bottom row: DC power

The back of the computer features a 25-pin RS-232C serial port; a 37-pin parallel bus port; and the slot for an optional modem. This modem could transmit data at 300 baud and was capable of auto-dialing, auto-answering, and wake-on-ring. The latter function was complex enough to allow the laptop to "set to wake up at 2:00 a.m. and send the daily sales report back to the computer at the home office". The serial port worked in tandem with the built-in VT100 terminal emulator to allow the RoadRunner to connect to a desktop computer for offline data storage or to connect to a remote mainframe via an external modem.

== Development ==
James P. Dunn, a former executive of Exxon, co-founded MicroOffice Systems Technology in October 1981 in Fairfield, Connecticut. The company's original intentions were to manufacture and develop office automation systems—particularly transportable systems. MicroOffice, which was worth US$2,500,000 in early 1982, received $500,000 of funding by Olivetti in February 1982, as part of Olivetti's strategy of targeting advanced technology corporations. Critical development of the RoadRunner began between late 1982 and January 1983, with a specified design goal of an under-five-pound weight and final street price of US$2,000. Olivetti offered suggestions to the laptop's design to coordinate it with Olivetti's line of word processors and other office equipment. Robert F. Weltzien, a former chairman of Timex, landed a position as CEO of MicroOffice in September 1983, in the lead-up to the RoadRunner's release. Weltzien had discovered MicroOffice shortly after its formation, after leaving Timex in 1980, and helped fund MicroOffice with his small venture capital company to fulfill his ambition of "build[ing] a company". He was also attracted to the RoadRunner's LCD, which "rang a bell with me because I came out of the watch business." He was named CEO for a brief period in 1982 but quit for lack of activity, as the company was still in deep in research and development. He moonlit at Citizen Watch until MicroOffice had completed its financing in August 1983, when he returned full-time.

MicroOffice targeted the RoadRunner at traveling salespeople and executives, writers and journalists, and other people of the "mobile professional" class. Richard Howell, manager of marketing, said that the RoadRunner was pitted between the cheaper TRS-80 Model 100 and the more expensive and smaller-screened Gavilan SC. However, he contended in October 1983: "I don't think we really have any direct competitors".

== Release and reception ==
The RoadRunner was unveiled at the 1983 Information Management Exposition & Conference at the New York Coliseum on October 10, where it was announced for a late November 1983 release. MicroOffice provided the laptop only to OEMs for rebadging or to large companies for fleet sales at the onset, with the promise of direct-order purchasing later on. Federal Data Corporation of Chevy Chase, Maryland, purchased a $1 million fleet of RoadRunner laptops and accompanying software cartridges in May 1984.

David H. Ahl of Creative Computing gave the RoadRunner a positive review, calling the "office on the road" moniker that MicroOffice was selling the machine under "apt". Ahl felt that the bundled applications made it a true "portable office" and, "with a weight of only five pounds and the compact data cartridges, you will be tempted to carry the machine everywhere". He wrote that the linear switches of the keyboard had a good feel and followed a primarily logical layout, unlike the contemporary IBM PC's keyboard, but he disliked the placement of the up arrow key between the period and right Shift (although he appreciated the arrow keys' inverted-T layout) and wrote that the placement of the Command key under the right Shift "is all-too-easy to press inadvertently bringing on all kinds of undesirable results." Ahl found MicroOffice's Editor "more than adequate" with the function bar "understandable and sensible, even without an instruction manual (the ultimate test)" but found their TRS-80 100–esque scheduler and phone book applications not "especially useful, particularly since they devour memory like crazy".

Author Owen Davies deemed the RoadRunner's clamshell design unique among the crop of portable computers of 1984. He wrote that the laptop was "one of the more promising contenders" and quite attractive. Davies disliked the clear plastic plate protecting the LCD, writing that it contributed to reflections and glare, but appreciated the future replaceability of the display. Davies found the compromises to the keyboard layout to make it portable adequate but found the placement of the Exit key next to the Backspace key user-unfriendly. He additionally found the feel of the keyboard "mushy" and "wobbly" but overall deemed it "perfectly adequate for full-speed touch typing." Davies concluded: "Overall, the RoadRunner is a useful, and even exciting system. If you need the portability, and particularly if you already have a desktop system running CP/M, the RoadRunner is definitely worth looking at."

== Legacy ==
MicroOffice continued marketing the RoadRunner until 1985, when the company was purchased by Telxon Corporation, a handheld computer manufacturer based in Akron, Ohio. MicroOffice continued operating as a subsidiary of Telxon, switching gears to develop custom software projects and provide data conversion services for medical offices and clinics. When Telxon was acquired by Symbol Technologies in 2000, MicroOffice was spun-off into a separate company once again and continued operating independently in the healthcare sector, until it was bought again by Medsphere Systems Corporation in 2020.

== See also ==
- Athena 1 (computer)
