= Epson HX-20 =

Laptop computer released by Epson in 1981

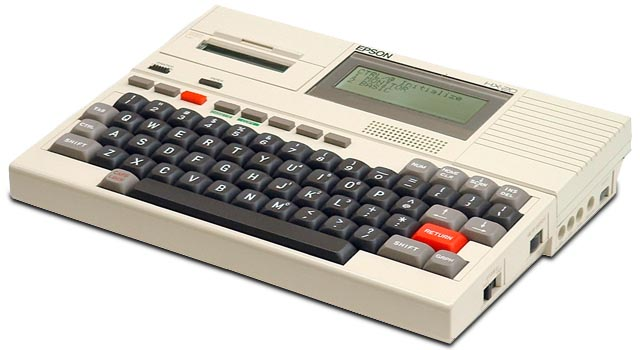
- The Epson HX-20
- Also known as: HC-20
- Manufacturer: Epson
- Type: Notebook computer
- Released: July 1982; 44 years ago
- Introductory price: US$795 (today $2570)
- CPU: Two Hitachi 6301 CPUs at 614 kHz
- Memory: 16 KB RAM expandable to 32 KB; 32 KB ROM expandable to 64 KB
- Display: 4 lines x 20 characters LCD
- Graphics: 120 × 32-pixel
- Input: Full-transit keyboard
- Power: rechargeable nickel-cadmium batteries
- Dimensions: A4 Sized
- Weight: Approximately 1.6 kg

The HX-20 (also known as the HC-20) was an early laptop computer released by Seiko Epson in July 1982. It was the first notebook-sized portable computer, occupying roughly the footprint of an A4 notebook while being lightweight enough to hold comfortably with one hand at 1.6 kilograms (3.5 lb) and small enough to fit inside an average briefcase.

Despite praise from journalists for its technical innovations, the computer was not a commercial success outside of Japan. Radio Shack's TRS-80 Model 100 (the American version of a Kyocera notebook), released in 1983, is thus credited as the first commercially successful notebook computer.

== History ==
The concept behind the HX-20 was first devised in July 1980 by Yukio Yokozawa, who worked for Suwa Seikosha, now the Seiko Epson subsidiary of the Japanese Seiko Group, receiving a patent for the invention. It was announced in 1981 as the HC-20 in Japan, and was introduced by Epson in North America as the HX-20 at the 1981 COMDEX computer show in Las Vegas, where it drew significant attention for its portability. It had a mass-market release in July 1982, as the HC-20 in Japan and as the Epson HX-20 in North America.

== Features ==
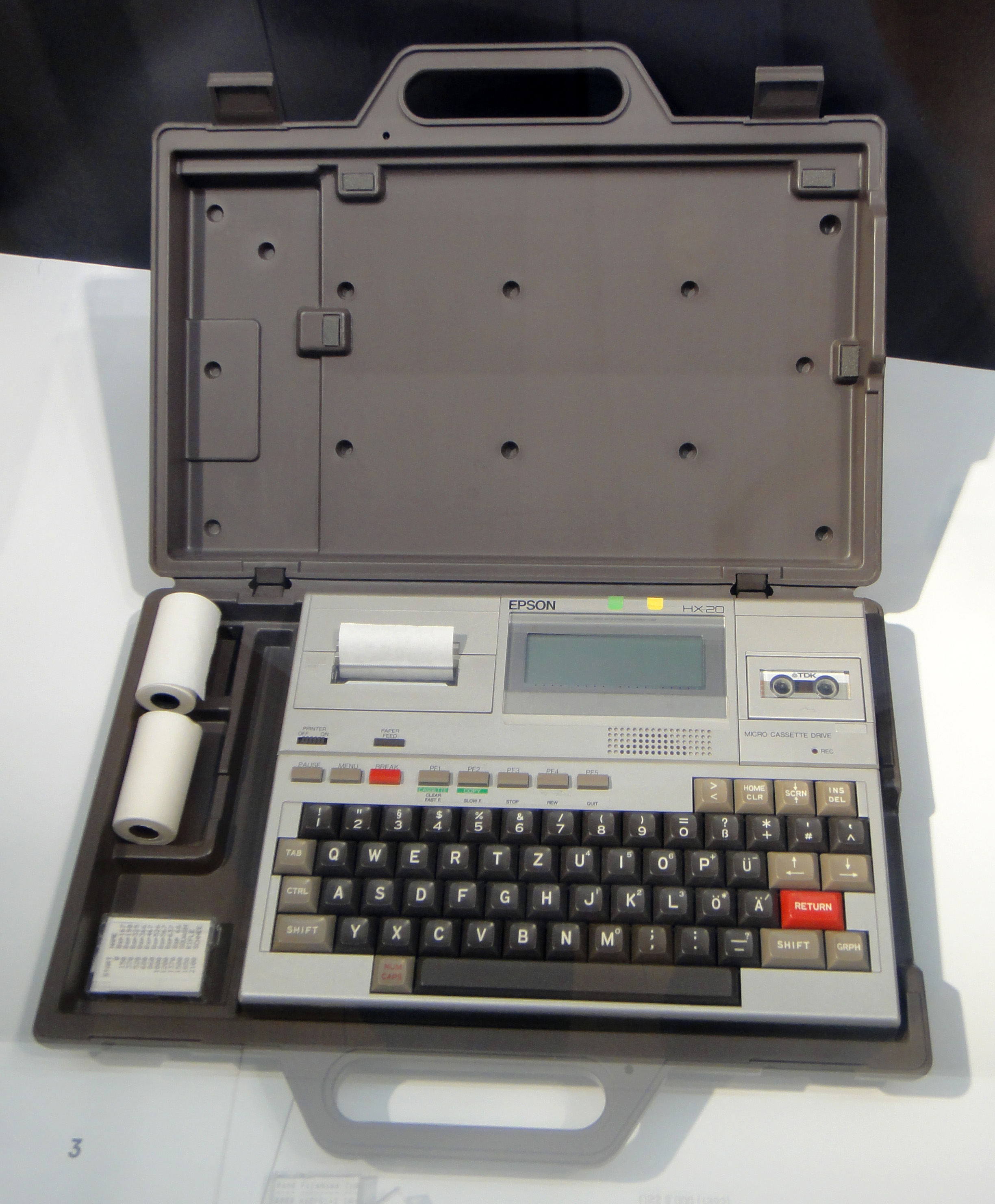
The Epson HX-20 in its transport case with two spare paper rolls

Epson advertised the HX-20 with a photograph and photo editing of the computer on two facing magazine pages with the headline "Actual size".

The Epson HX-20 weighed approximately 1.6 kilograms (3.5 lb) and featured a full-transit keyboard, rechargeable nickel-cadmium batteries, and a built-in 120 × 32-pixel LCD which allowed 4 lines of 20 characters. It featured a calculator-size dot-matrix printer, the EPSON BASIC programming language, two Hitachi 6301 CPUs running at 614 kHz (which were essentially an enhanced Motorola 6801), 16 kB RAM expandable to 32 kB, two RS-232 ports which ran at a maximum of 4800 bits/s for the first 8-pin DIN connector intended for modem or serial printer, and a maximum of 38400 bits/s for the second port using a 5-pin DIN connector which was mainly for use with external floppy drive and video display, an early concept of a docking station, a built-in microcassette drive, and a barcode reader connector. A 300 bit/s acoustic coupler was also available.

The HX-20 used a proprietary operating system, which consisted of the EPSON BASIC interpreter and a monitor program. The known colors of the machine are silver and cream, while some prototypes are dark grey. The HX-20 was supplied with a grey or brown carrying case. An external acoustic coupler, the CX-20, was available, as was an external floppy disk drive, the TF-20, and an external speech synthesis Augmentative Communication Device (ACD), 'RealVoice'. Another extension was the serially connected 40 × 24 character video. It used a special protocol, EPSP, which was also used by the external floppy disk drive.

The battery life of the HX-20 was approximately 50 hours running BASIC and less using the microcassette, printer, or RS-232 port. Data integrity could be preserved in the 4.0–6.0 V range. The power supply was rated for 8 W. Operating and charging it would tolerate 5–35 °C. Data integrity could be preserved at −5–40 °C. The HX-20 could be stored between −20–60 °C.

The later, more popular TRS-80 Model 100 line from Radio Shack, designed by Kyocera, owed much to the design of the HX-20.

== Reception ==
In September 1983, the tech magazine BYTE wrote that the HX-20, available in the United States for about a year, had been unsuccessful because of the lack of software or accessories. The review also noted that Epson had included the formerly US$160 microcassette drive in the standard US$795 configuration, as well as bundling a simple word processor. BYTE praised the printer as "nothing short of amazing" but criticized the lack of an operating system for cassette storage and said that compared to the TRS-80 Model 100's display, "the HX-20 looks primitive".

== Use in college prank ==
In April 1984, the tech magazine BYTE reported that an HX-20 had been used to control the Rose Bowl scoreboard remotely during the 1984 Rose Bowl prank.

== LCD ==
The LCD is 120×32 pixels and is controlled by six μPD7227 LCD controller ICs, each responsible for 40×16 pixels of the LCD. The μPD7227 uses a serial protocol and has two memory banks for switching between rows 0-7 and 8–15. It features multiple modes, including "Write", "Read", "AND", "OR", and "Character". The "character" mode draws characters from a built-in character map, but this mode is not used on the HX-20. Each bank is 40 bytes, with bit 6 of the address determining the bank. Even though the address can be up to 127, nothing will happen when trying to access data outside the banks. If the pointer action in a command is set to decrement and the pointer is at 0, the pointer will wrap to 127.

== Monitor ==
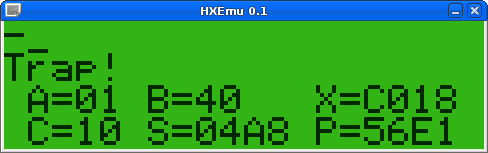
Monitor entered via a trap

The Monitor program can be accessed via the main menu on startup by pressing 1, by typing the command "MON" in BASIC, or by causing a trap (that is, writing/reading to/from protected addresses or executing an illegal instruction).

In the event of a trap, "Trap!" will be displayed in the Monitor, and the user can use it for debugging.

When entering Monitor, it shows a prompt on the first line, "Trap!" on the second line (if entered via a trap), and the CPU registers as they were right before the Monitor was entered on the third and fourth lines. These registers are:

- A (Accumulator A)
- B (Accumulator B)
- X (Index Register)
- C (Condition Code Register)
- S (Stack Pointer)
- P (program counter)

The monitor can be used for reading and writing memory, modifying CPU registers, running code at specific addresses in memory, saving/loading memory to/from a plugin option, etc. This is very useful for debugging programs written in machine code in contrast to programs written in the EPSON BASIC programming language.

=== Commands ===
| Command | Syntax | Description |
|---|---|---|
| S (Set) | S<addr> [old] [new] | Writes the 8-bit value "new" (in hex) to 16-bit address <addr>. Entering only the address and pressing enter will make the old value at the address appear, and the cursor will be put after the old value for entering a new value. |
| D (Dump) | D<addr> | Dumps the values from addresses <addr> to <addr + 14> to the display. |
| G (Go) | G<addr>,<breakpoint> | Sets the program counter to the 16-bit address <addr> and will return to Monitor before the breakpoint address <breakpoint> is executed. |
| X (Examine) | X | Allows the user to display and change the contents of each register. The RETURN key applies the changed value (if any) and jumps between registers. Typing a non-hexadecimal character exits this command. |
| R (Read) | R<device>,<filename> | Transfer data from an external storage to memory. <device> can be any of M (microcassette), C (external cassette), and P (ROM cartridge). The memory address is specified using the "A (Address)" command. |
| W (Write) | W<device>,<filename> | Transfer data from memory specified by the "A (Address)" command to an external storage. See "R (Read)" for more information. ROM cartridge is not supported by this command. |
| V (Verify) | V<device>,<filename> | Verifies data transferred to an external storage against the memory specified by the "A (Address)" command. See "R (Read)" for more information. ROM cartridge is not supported by this command. |
| A (Address) | A | Specify an address range for commands R, W and V. The user will be prompted with T (Top address), L (Last address), O (Offset value) and E (Entrypoint). Offset and entrypoint values are only used by the "W (Write)" and "V (Verify)" commands. |
| K (Key set) | K<text> | Enter a sequence of keys to be pressed automatically on power up (and reset). Press CTRL+@ to stop. A maximum of 18 characters can be entered and function keys counts as two characters. |
| B (Back) | B | Return to the procedure from which Monitor was called. |

== Memory map ==
| Start | End | Description |
|---|---|---|
| 0000 | 001F | Internal registers |
| 0020 | 003F | I/O select |
| 0040 | 007F | RTC registers + RAM |
| 0080 | 3FFF | RAM |
| 4000 | 5FFF | Used by expansion unit |
| 6000 | 7FFF | ROM #4 (Option ROM) |
| 8000 | 9FFF | ROM #3 |
| A000 | BFFF | ROM #2 |
| C000 | DFFF | ROM #1 |
| E000 | FFFF | ROM #0 |

ROM #0 and #1 are known as the I/O ROMs, handling system reset and providing functions for using the LCD, keyboard, clock, printer, speaker, serial communication, etc. The I/O ROMs are equivalent to the BIOS in modern PCs. ROM #0 also contains the interrupt vector table at FFF0-FFFF. FFFE-FFFF determines what the program counter should be set to on power-up or reset. In the standard set of ROMs for the HX-20, this value is E000, the start of ROM #0.

ROM #2 and #3 contains the BASIC interpreter. If the BASIC ROMs are removed from the motherboard, the BASIC option in the main menu will disappear, leaving only MONITOR. This is because ROM #3 contains a program header, which is detected by the menu routines. This works the same for all user-created programs, except the program type is different.

The expansion unit added up to 16 KB of RAM and two ROM sockets. The latter could only be used by switching off the internal BASIC ROMS.

== Similar Epson models ==
- HC-80 (Japanese version of the PX-8)
- HC-88 (Japanese version of the PX-8)
- HX-40 (American version of the PX-4)
- HX-45 (American version of the PX-4+)
- KX-1
- PX-16 (IBM PC compatible portable, cartridges compatible with PX-4)
- PX-4 (successor of the HX-20, with larger screen and CP/M compatible like the PX-8)
- PX-8 (Geneva)
- EHT-30, EHT-40

== See also ==
- Epson ActionNote
