= TRS-80 Model 100 =

Portable computer introduced in 1983

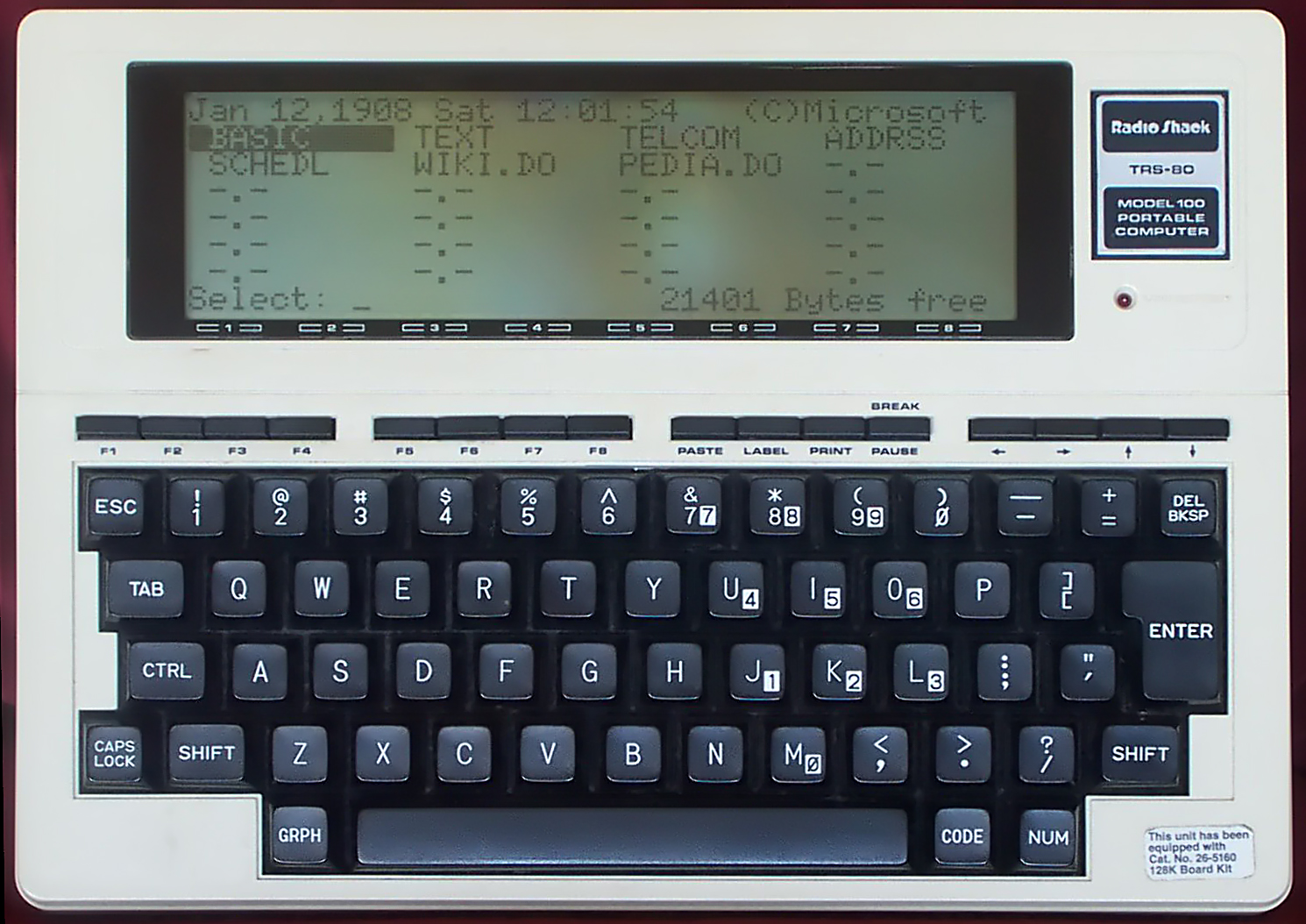
- Developer: Kyocera, Tandy, Microsoft
- Type: Portable computer (notebook)
- Released: April 26, 1983; 43 years ago
- Introductory price: 8K version US$1,099 (equivalent to $3,600 in 2025); 24K versions US$1,399 (equivalent to $4,500 in 2025)
- Units sold: 6 million
- Operating system: Custom dedicated runtime in firmware
- CPU: 2.4 MHz Intel 80C85
- Memory: 8 KB – 32 KB
- Display: 8 lines, 40 characters LCD
- Graphics: 240 by 64 pixel addressable graphics
- Input: Keyboard: 56 keys, 8 programmable function keys, 4 dedicated command keys, and 4 cursor control keys
- Power: Four penlight (AA) cells, or external power adapter 6V (>180 mA)
- Dimensions: 300 by 215 x 50 mm
- Weight: About 1.4 kg (3.1 lb) with batteries

The TRS-80 Model 100 is a notebook-sized portable computer introduced in April 1983. It was the first commercially successful notebook computer, as well as one of the first notebook computers ever released. It features a keyboard and liquid-crystal display, in a battery-powered package roughly the size and shape of a notepad or large book. The 224-page, spiral-bound User Manual is nearly the same size as the computer itself.

It was made by Kyocera, and originally sold in Japan as the Kyotronic 85. Although a slow seller for Kyocera, the rights to the machine were purchased by Tandy Corporation. The computer was sold through Radio Shack stores in the United States and Canada and affiliated dealers in other countries. It became one of the company's most popular models, with over 6 million units sold worldwide. The Olivetti M10 and the NEC PC-8201 and PC-8300 were also built on the same Kyocera platform, with some design and hardware differences. It was originally marketed as a Micro Executive Work Station (MEWS), although the term did not catch on and was eventually dropped.

== Specifications ==
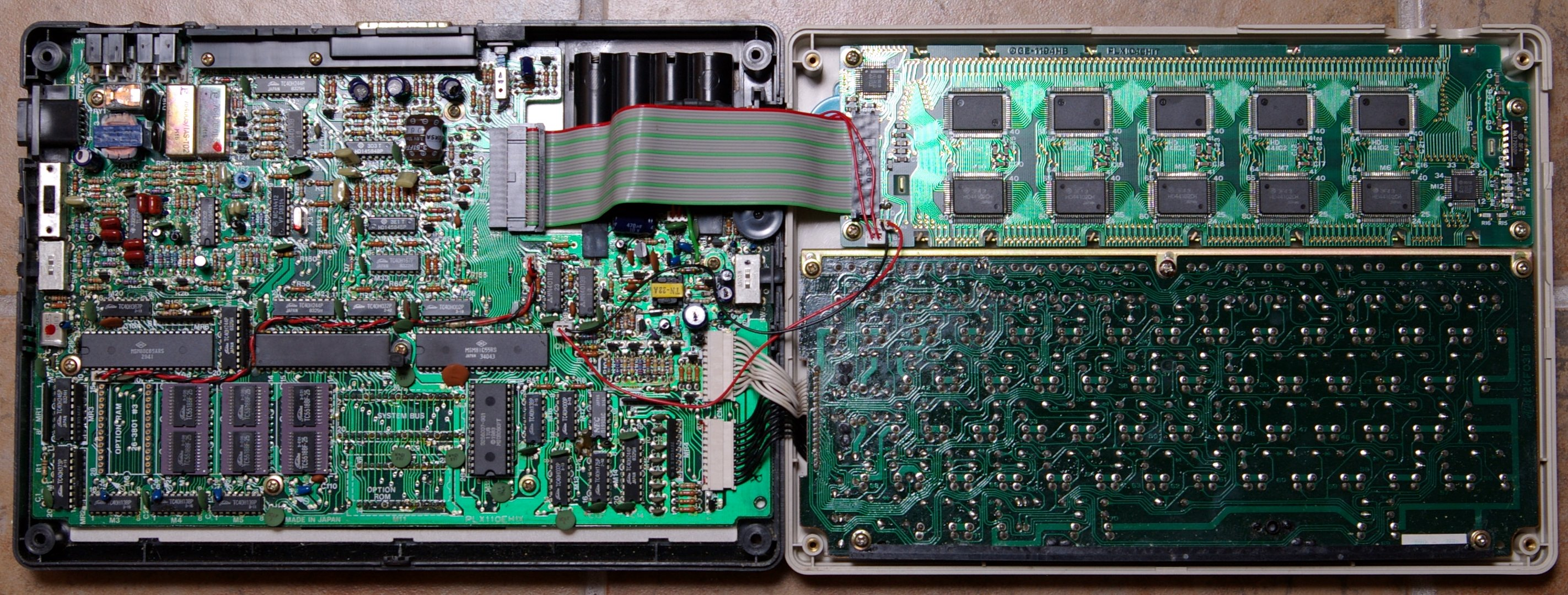
The internals of the TRS-80 Model 100. The left half is the back.

- Processor: 8-bit Oki 80C85, CMOS, 2.4576 MHz
- Memory: 32 KB ROM; 8, 16, 24, or 32 KB static RAM. Machines with less than 32 KB can be expanded in 8 KB increments of plug-in static RAM modules. An additional 32 KB Option ROM can be installed, for a total of 64 KB of ROM (bank-switched in a 32 KB aperture), and the Standard ROM is socket-mounted (not soldered-in) so is readily replaceable.
- Display: 8 lines, 40 characters LCD, with 240 by 64 pixel addressable graphics, twisted nematic (gray) monochrome. The screen is reflective, not backlit. (Note: The display hardware is pure graphics; character display is generated by software, and the 8x40 character format is a characteristic of the standard ROM software (which, incidentally, is socketed and replaceable).) The screen was made by Sharp Electronics. The LCD controllers are by Hitachi: (10) HD44102CH column controller ICs and (2) HD44103CH row driver ICs; the HD44102CH's provide the programmable hardware interface to software. The refresh rate is about 70 Hz (coarsely regulated by an RC oscillator, not a crystal).
- Keyboard: 56 keys, QWERTY layout with full standard spacing, eight programmable function keys, four dedicated command keys, and four cursor control keys. These last 16 are tactile "button"-style keys. Almost all keys other than the 16 "button" keys are capable of key rollover (without phantom keys appearing depressed), so multi-key combinations can be used.
- Peripherals: The basic unit includes: Built-in 300 baud telephone (POTS) modem (external cable necessary), Centronics-compatible parallel printer port, cassette audio tape I/O, barcode reader input, RS-232 serial communication port (sharing serial I/O chip with internal modem), real-time clock.
- Expansion: System bus interface 40-pin DIP socket (under a cover on the bottom of the machine).
- Dimensions: 300 mm × 215 mm × 50 mm, weight about 1.4 kilograms (3.1 lb) with batteries
- Power supply: Four AA batteries, or external power adapter 6V (>180 mA, tip negative configuration)
- Audio: Piezoelectric speaker

The 8K and 24K versions sold for US$1,099 and US$1,399.

The Model 100 runs for up to 20 hours on four alkaline AA batteries. A built-in 3.6V NiCad rechargeable battery maintains memory during battery swaps. The computer cannot run from the rechargeable nickel-cadmium batteries available at the time without hardware modification.

== Data storage ==
The computer includes a port to connect a cassette audiotape recorder for storage of data and programs. Programs written in BASIC can load and save data and programs to the cassette device. Control is provided to start and stop the tape, but the operator has to manually put the cassette recorder into "record" or "play" mode as needed.

A popular alternative is the Tandy Portable Disk Drive (TPDD), introduced in late 1985, an RS-232 serial device capable of storing 100 KB of data FM-encoded on a 3.5-inch single-sided double-density diskette; this drive is identical to the Brother FB100 drive for knitting machines. A second version, the TPDD2, can store up to 200 KB.

A Disk/Video Interface expansion box was released in 1984, with one single-sided double-density 180 KB 5-1/4 inch disk drive and a CRT video adapter. This allows the Model 100 to display 40 or 80 column video on an external television set or video monitor. One empty drive bay permits the installation of a second disk drive.

Another form of data backup is file transfer to a desktop computer, via either the modem connected to a telephone line, or the RS-232 serial port connected to a null modem cable. The built-in TELCOM firmware makes this a convenient option. The TRS-80 Model 4's TRSDOS 6 operating system includes the TAPE100 utility that uses the Model 4's cassette port to read and write tapes created by a Model 100, the data of which are stored in TRSDOS disk files. TRSDOS 6 also has a communications application (COMM/CMD), and the Model 100 was a popular "peripheral" for the Model 4 customer.

A bar code reader wand was also offered.

== ROM firmware ==
When first switched on, the Model 100 displays a menu of applications and files and the date and time. The ROM firmware-based system boots instantly, and the program that was running when the unit was powered off is ready to use immediately on power-up. Cursor keys are used to navigate the menu and select one of the internal or added application programs, or any data file to work on.

The 32 kilobyte read-only memory of the Model 100 contains the N82 version of the Microsoft BASIC 80 programming language. This is similar to other Microsoft BASICs of the time and includes good support for the hardware features of the machine: Pixel addressing of the display, support for the internal modem and serial port, monophonic sound, access to tape and RAM files, support for the real-time clock and the bar code reader, and I/O redirection between the machine's various logical devices. Like previous Microsoft BASIC interpreters, variable names are restricted to two characters and all program lines and subroutines are numbered and not named. However, the default for floating point numbers is double-precision.

The ROM also contains a terminal program, TELCOM; an address/phone book organizer, ADDRSS; a to-do list organizer, SCHEDL; and a simple text editor, TEXT. The TELCOM program allows automation of a login sequence to a remote system under control of the BASIC interpreter. As with other home computers of the era, a vast collection of PEEK and POKE locations were collected by avid hobbyists.

The Model 100 TEXT editor is noticeably slow in execution, especially for fast touch typists. This is due partly to the slow 8085 CPU and due partly to the slow response time of the LCD screen. Often after speed-typing a sentence or two, the user must wait several seconds for the computer to "catch up".

TEXT partially supports the WordStar command interface. The supported commands are the cursor movement and character deletion Ctrl+Alpha key combinations on the left hand side of the keyboard; the commands for activating Wordstar menus, like the Ctrl+K Block menu, are not functional.

Invisible files in the system RAM named "Hayashi" and "Suzuki" commemorate the names of designers Junji Hayashi and Jey Suzuki. Another invisible deleted file named "RickY" refers to Rick Yamashita. The Model 100 firmware is the last Microsoft product that Bill Gates developed personally, along with Jey Suzuki. According to Gates, "Part of my nostalgia about this machine is this was the last machine where I wrote a very high percentage of the code in the product."

Added applications and data files are stored in the internal battery-backed RAM; these can be loaded from and stored to an audio cassette tape recorder or external floppy disk drive. Optional ROMs can be installed in the Model 100, providing a range of customized application software. Only one optional ROM can be installed at a time. Some commercial software applications for the Model 100 were also distributed on cassette.

The Model 100 ROM has a Y2K bug; the century displayed on the main menu is hard-coded as "19XX". Since the century of the date is not important for any of the software functions, and the real-time clock hardware in the Model 100 does not have a calendar and requires the day of the week to be set independently of the date, the flaw does not impair the usability of the computer.

== Applications ==
The portability and simplicity of the Model 100 made it attractive to journalists; As of 1990, the 100 and 200 were among the few low-EMI computers approved for use on airline flights. Writers can type about 11 pages of text (if upgraded to the maximum of 32 KB RAM) and then transmit it for electronic editing and production using the built-in modem and TELCOM program.

The excellent keyboard is probably the most important reason for the computer's popularity. It is full-size and uses a standard (QWERTY) layout; reviewers praised it but reported that it was noisy. To quiet the computer, owners put orthodontic rubber bands under the keys. The computer is otherwise silent when it operates, except for the speaker, and runs for 20 hours on 4 readily available and easily replaceable AA batteries. Data is protected by a built-in rechargeable (Ni-Cd) battery when the AA batteries discharge or are removed for replacement. There are several simple programs available on the Internet for transferring files between a Model 100 and a modern personal computer (or a vintage one).

The Model 100 was also used for industrial applications and in science laboratories as a programming terminal for configuration of control systems and instruments. Its compactness (ease of handling and small space requirements), low maintenance needs, lack of air vents (a plus for dusty or dirty environments), full complement of ports, and easy portability makes it very well suited for these applications.

Third-party peripherals for the Model 100 extends its battery life and file storage capacity. Software extends the display capabilities (to 60 columns and 10 rows of text using smaller characters) and provides more advanced word-processing or calculation software than the supplied programs. Hobbyists continue to design games, applications, and hardware using the pixel-addressable display. Users are able to create their own applications using the included BASIC programming language. There are no built-in facilities for 8085 assembler programming, but the thoroughly documented BASIC interpreter by Microsoft offers tricks for accessing machine code subroutines. These tricks usually involve packing the raw object code into strings or integer arrays, and are familiar to programmers for the older TRS-80 Models I and III.

== Peers and successors ==
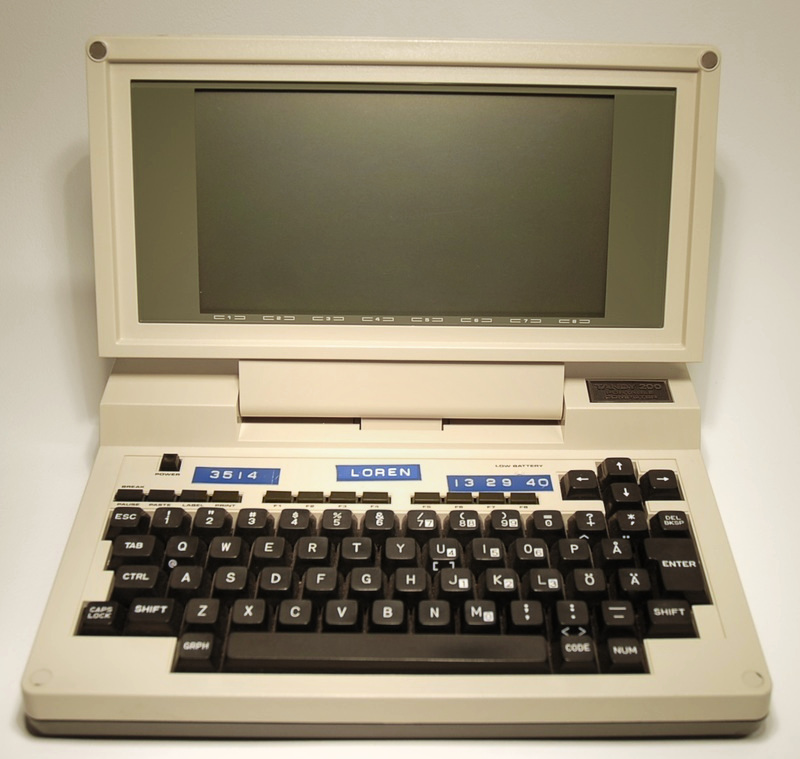
Tandy Model 200

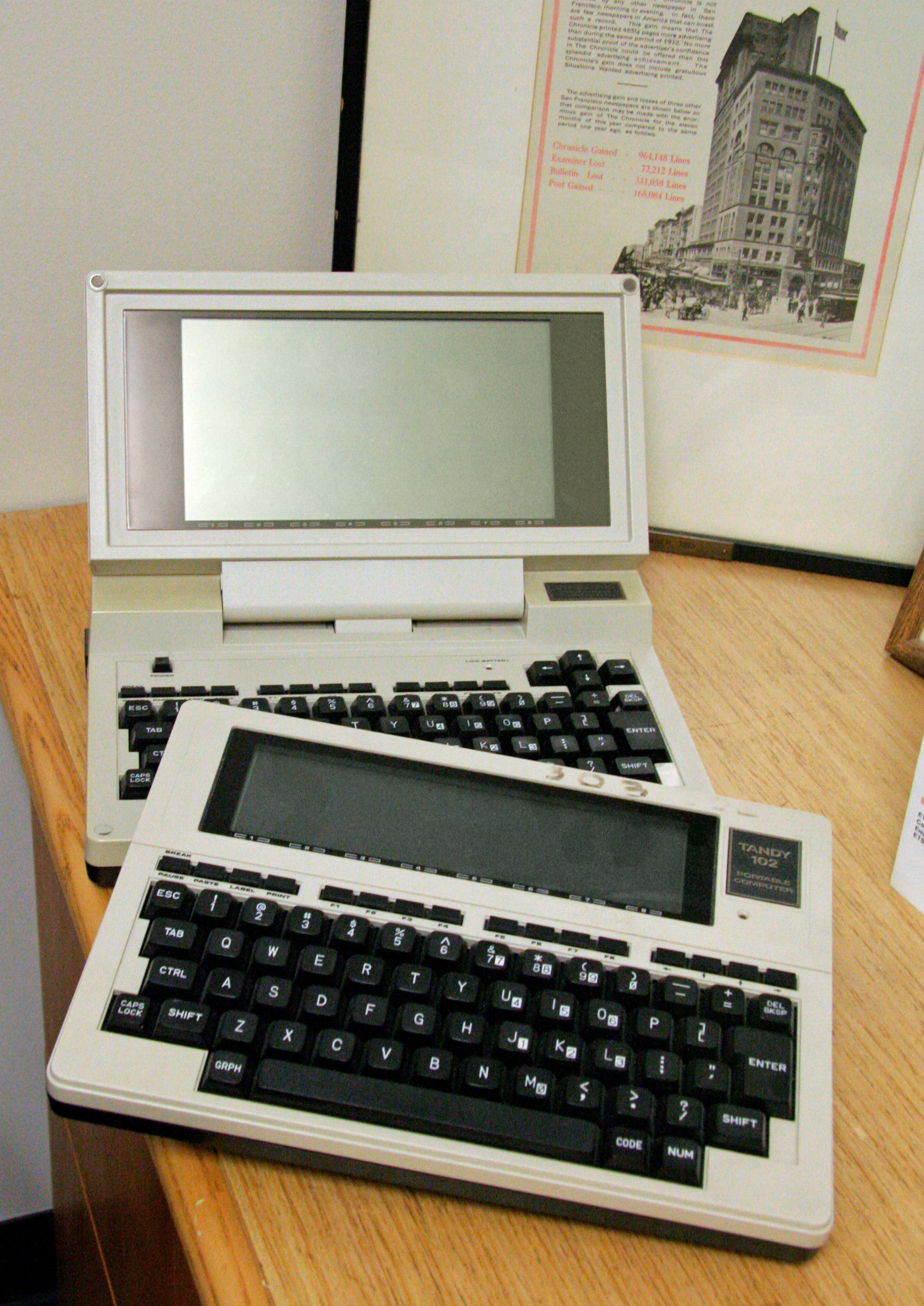
A Tandy 102 portable and Tandy 200 laptop

The Tandy 200 was introduced in 1984 as a more capable sister product of the Model 100. The Tandy 200 has a flip-up 16 line by 40 column display and came with 24 KB RAM which can be expanded to 72 KB (3 banks of 24 KB). Rather than the "button" style keys of the Model 100, its four arrow keys are a cluster of keys of the same size and shape as those comprising the keyboard, though the function and command "keys" are still of the button type. The Tandy 200 includes Multiplan, a spreadsheet application. It also added DTMF tone dialing for the internal modem, whereas the Model 100 only supports pulse dialing. On a phone line that does not support pulse dialing, users may dial manually using a touch-tone phone and then put the Model 100 online.

The last new related computer is the Tandy 600, introduced in October 1985. Similar to the Tandy 200, it features a flip-up screen, but with 80 columns rather than 40. Built-in features include a 3.5" diskette drive, rechargeable batteries, and 32K of RAM expandable to 224K. The underlying software platform is Microsoft's 16-bit Hand Held Operating System (Handheld DOS or HHDOS), along with word processing, calendar, database, communication and spreadsheet software. Unlike earlier models, BASIC was an extra-cost option rather than built in.

The last refresh to the product line was the Tandy 102, introduced in 1986 as a direct replacement for the Model 100, having the same software, keyboard, and screen, and a nearly identical, but thinner, form factor that weighed about one pound less than the Model 100. This reduction in size and weight was made possible by the substitution of surface-mount chip packaging. Standard memory for the Model 102, 24K RAM, is upgradable to 32K with an ordinary 8K SRAM chip.

Later portables from Tandy no longer featured a ROM-based software environment, starting with the Tandy 1400LT, which uses a diskette-based MS-DOS operating system in 768 KB of RAM, utilising two built-in 3.5" floppy drives. This model resembles the IBM PC Convertible with a "clamshell" design and has a screen supporting a textual display of 80 x 25 characters and a graphical resolution of 640 x 200 pixels, with eight intensity levels achieved using a form of pulse-width modulation.

Tandy also released similar word processing portables for the education market based on a Z80-compatible CPU: The Tandy WP-2 in 1989 equipped with 32 KB of RAM and 256 KB of ROM containing the application software, and the Tandy WP-3 in 1993 equipped with 64 KB of RAM. The WP-2 has serial and parallel interfaces, a cassette recorder port, an expansion card slot for 32 KB of non-volatile RAM, and an internal 32 KB RAM expansion slot. A disk drive connects via the serial port. In 1993, Tandy also announced the Tandy PPC-10 pocket PC, based on an 80C86-compatible CPU and having 1 MB of RAM, bundled with MS-DOS 5.0, Microsoft Works 2.0, PC link and personal information management software, also featuring two PCMCIA slots.

=== Similar computers from other companies ===
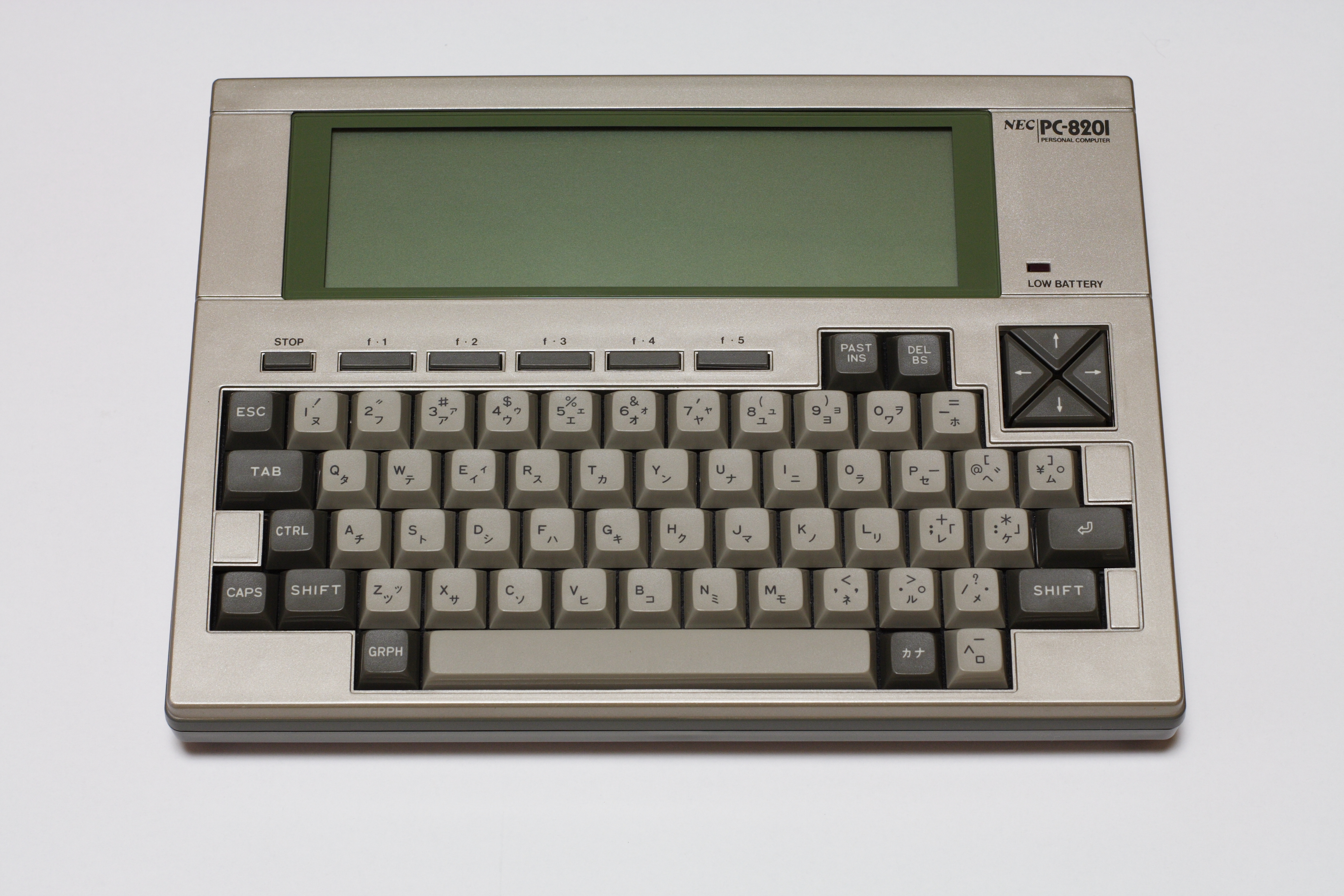
NEC PC-8201

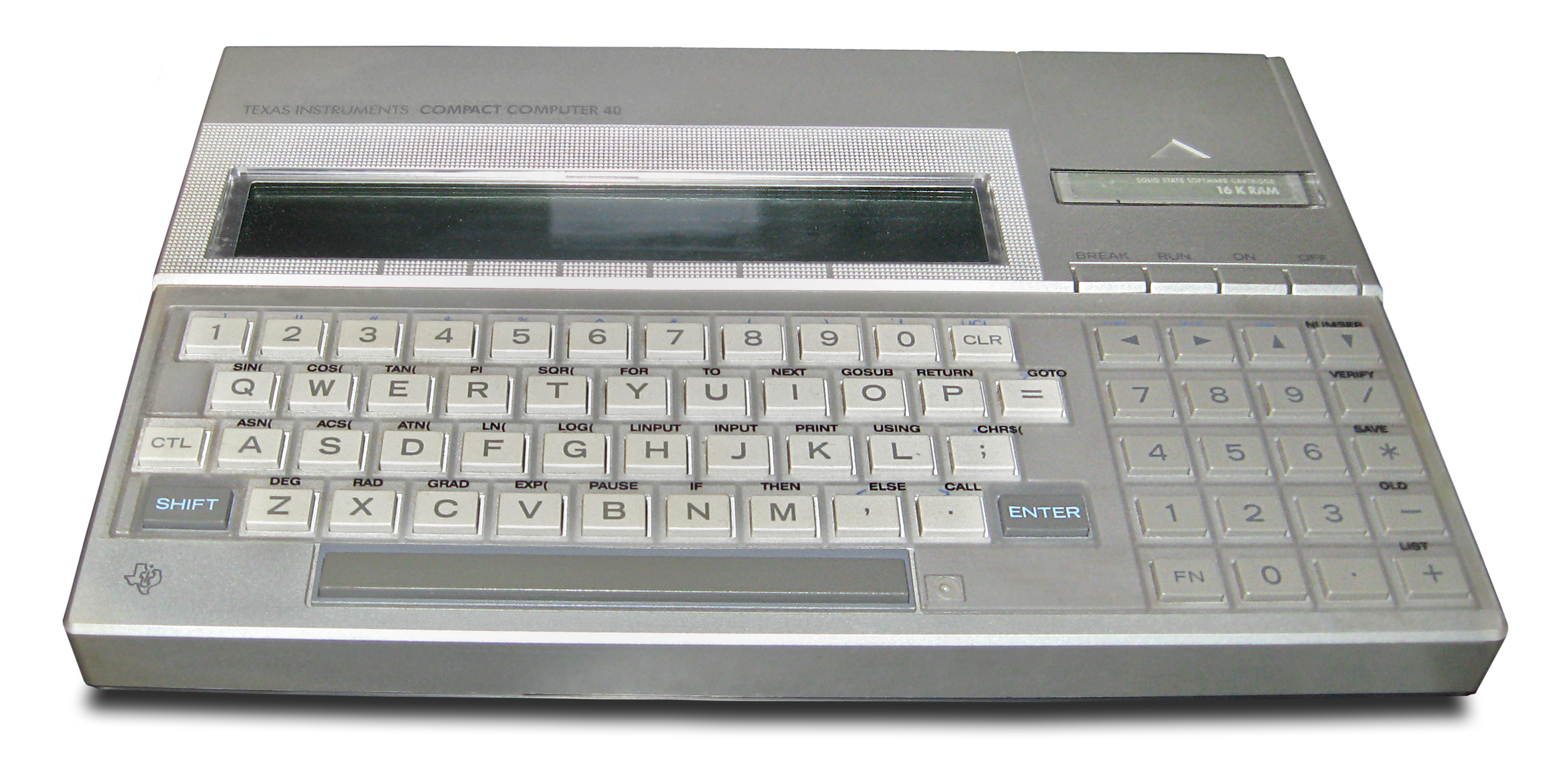
TI Compact Computer 40

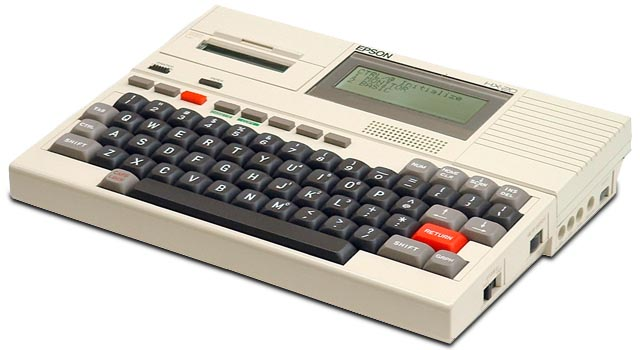
Epson HX-20

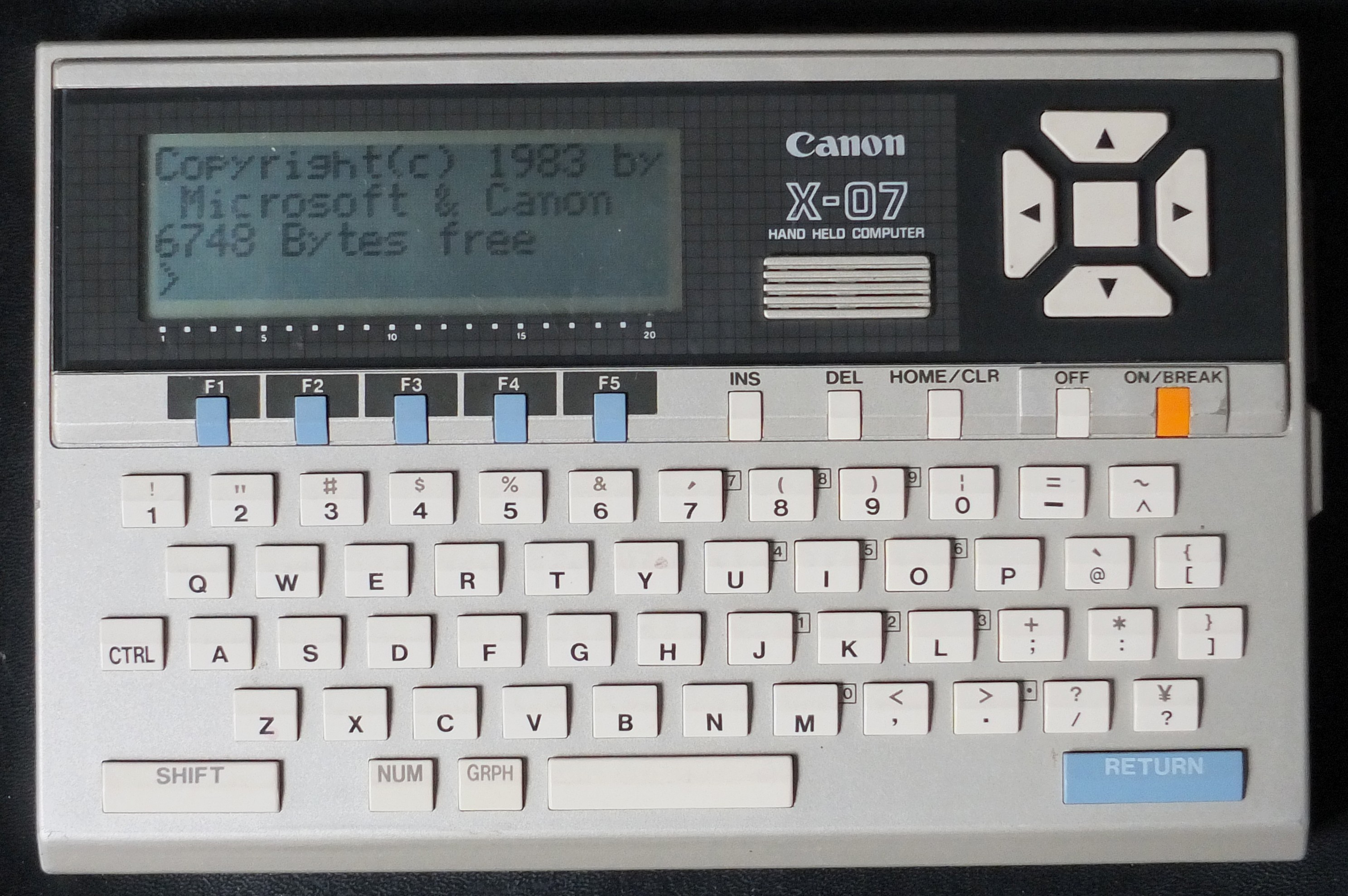
Canon X-07

The Olivetti M10, NEC PC-8201 and NEC PC-8300 were built on the same platform as the original Kyocera design, although the Olivetti M10 has a display that could be tilted towards the user. The earlier and smaller Epson HX-20 of 1982 has a much smaller LCD, four lines of 20 characters, and an internal cassette tape drive for program and file storage. There were several other "calculator-style" computers available at the time, including the Casio FP-200, the Compact Computer 40, and the Canon X-07.

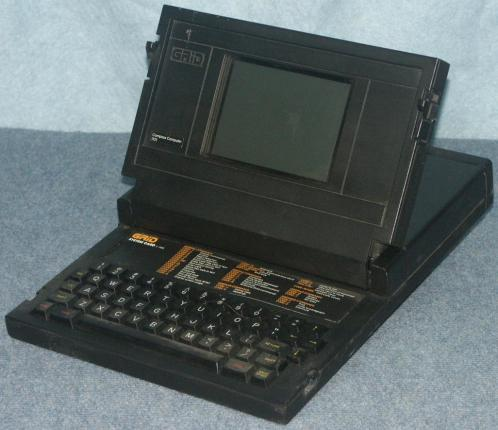
GRiD Compass 1101

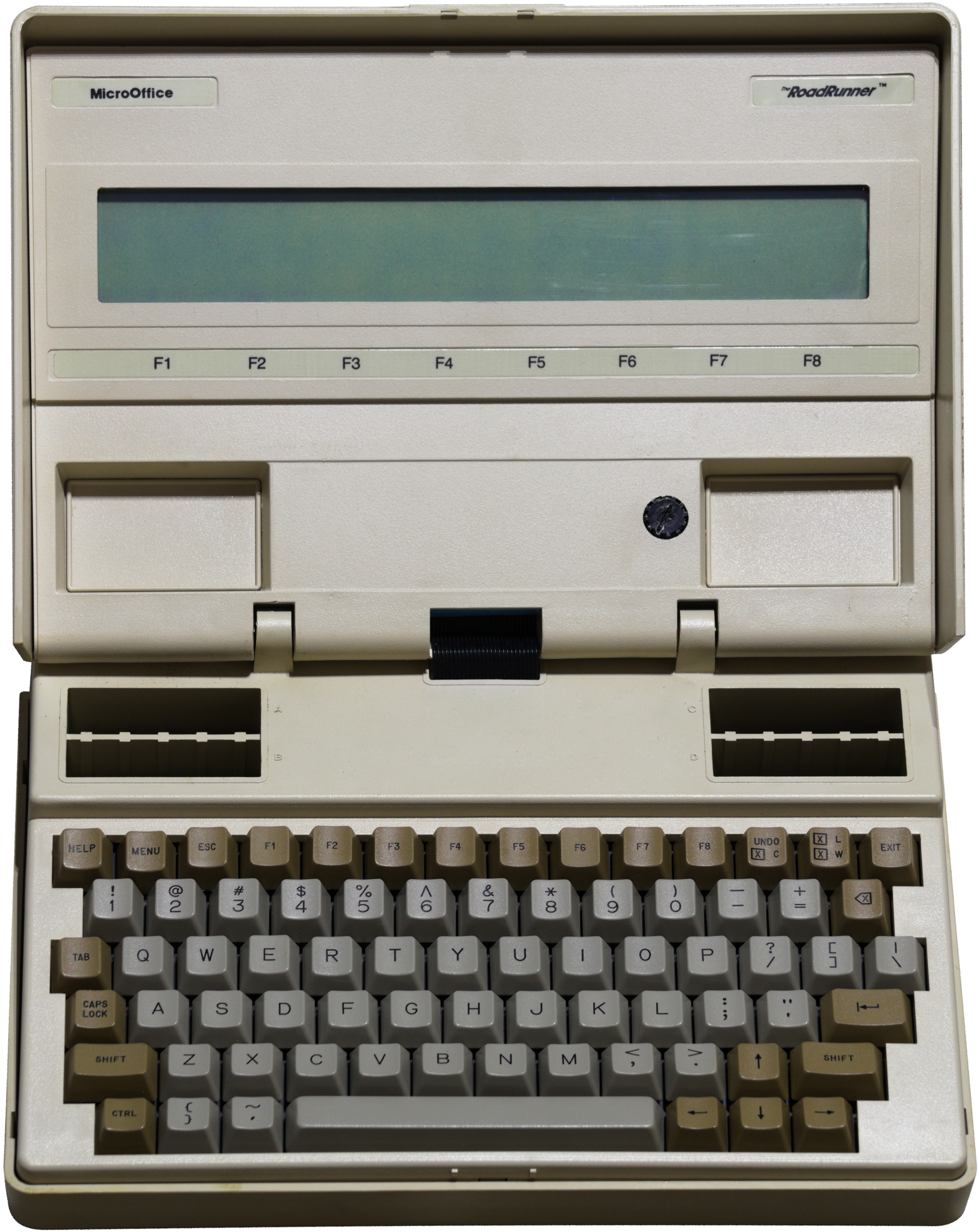
MicroOffice RoadRunner

Systems of about the same size and form-factor as the Model 100, aimed at journalists, were sold by companies such as Teleram, as the Teleram T-3000 and GRiD Systems, as the GRiD Compass, which was used by NASA. GRiD was later acquired by Tandy. The Bondwell 2 of 1985 is a CP/M laptop in a similar form factor to the Model 200. Both Convergent Technologies and MicroOffice released the WorkSlate and the RoadRunner respectively in late 1983.

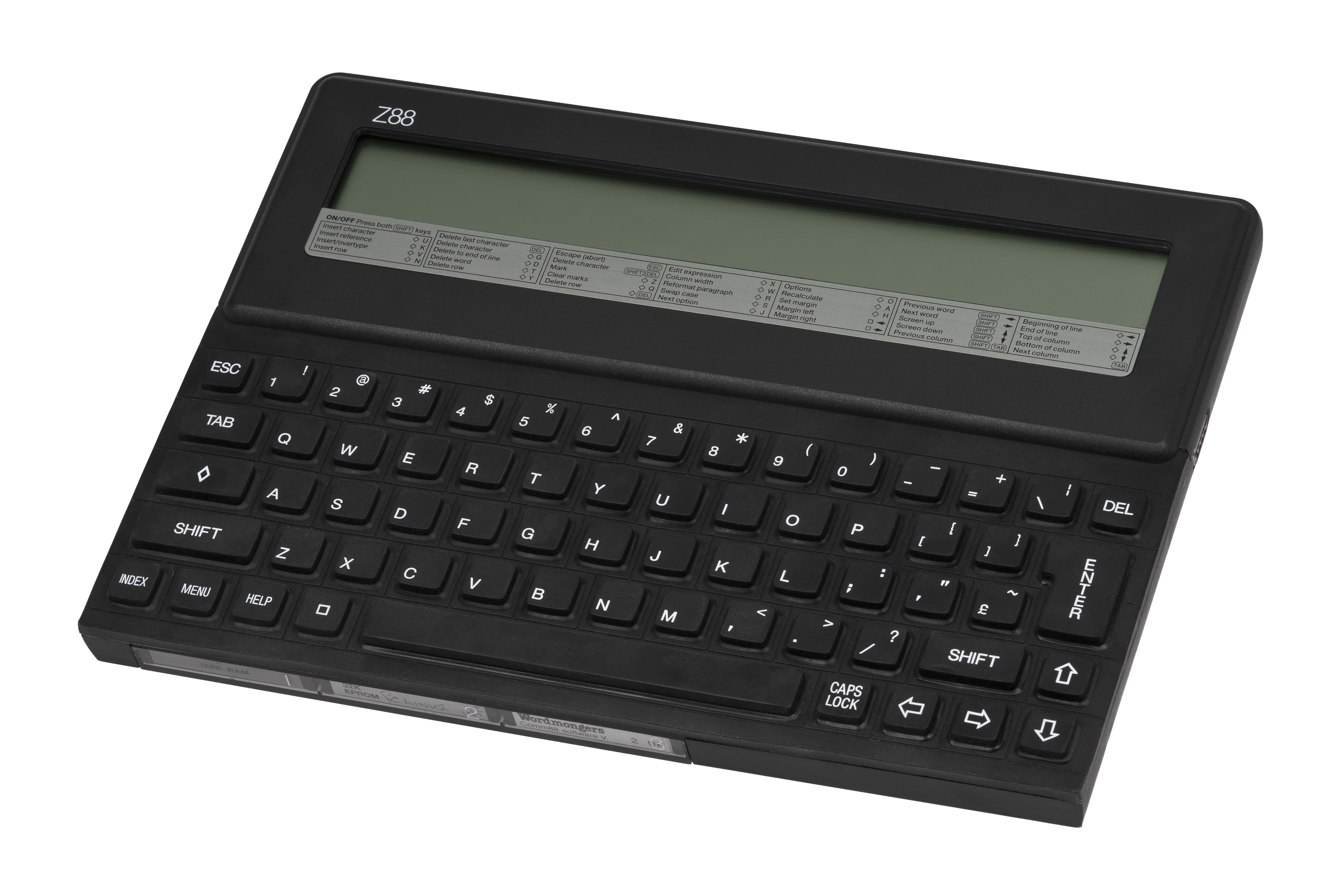
Cambridge Z88

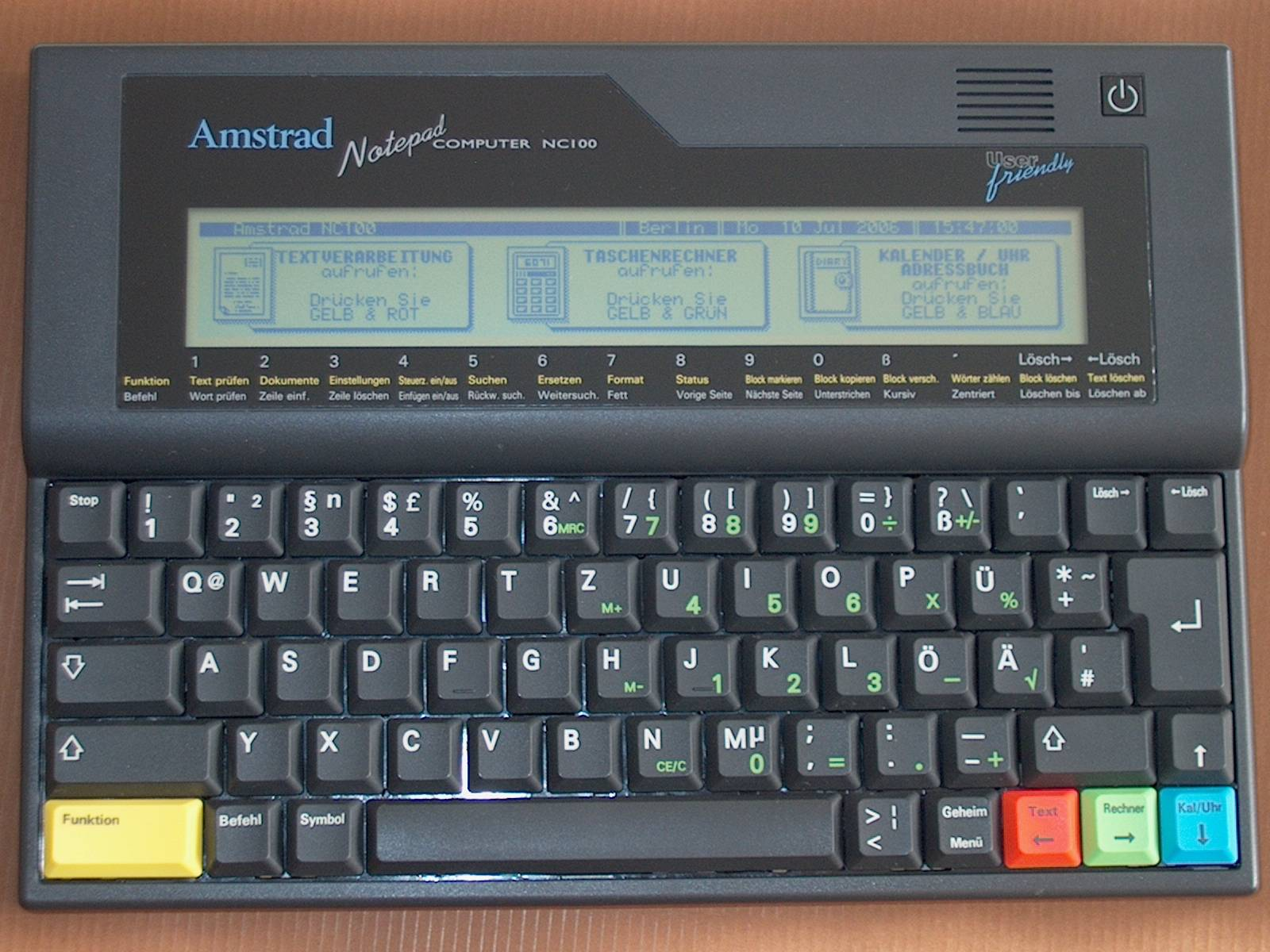
Amstrad NC100

Computers from two other British companies were similar in form and functionality to the Model 100 and its successors. The Cambridge Z88 of 1987, developed by British inventor Sir Clive Sinclair, has greater expansion capacity due to its built-in cartridge slots. It has a far more sophisticated operating system called OZ that could run multiple applications in a task-switched environment. The firmware contains a powerful application called Pipedream that is a spreadsheet that can also serve as a word processor and database. In comparison, the Tandy WP-2 was regarded in one review as "easier to use and sturdier than the Z88" with a "proper keyboard" as opposed to the Z88's "rubber membrane keyboard". Moreover, the WP-2 also includes a 100,000-word spellchecking dictionary and 200,000-word thesaurus, making the Tandy product more compelling as a dedicated word processor. The other British computers are the Amstrad NC100 and NC200, produced from 1992.

The electronic word processing keyboards AlphaSmart Dana and the Quickpad Pro bear some resemblance to the physical format of the TRS-80 Model 100. In Japan, Pomera still makes and sells dedicated word processors under model names Pomera DM100, Pomera DM200 etc.

The Laser 50 educational computer is in the same size and form factor as the Model 100, and was sold by Video Technology.

== Reception ==
Tandy sold an estimated one million Model 100 and 102 computers by 1991. PC World named it among the ten most important laptops of all time.

Tandy stated in 1984 that the Model 100's sales "have only been moderate", and an InfoWorld columnist said in 1985 that "it was only journalists" who had been buying it. By 1983 David Burnett and Bill Pierce were using Model 100s, and Newsday reportedly bought 500 units. The system's popularity with journalists probably helped Radio Shack improve the company's poor reputation with the press and in the industry. San Francisco Examiner reporters used the 100 to help publish an emergency edition of the newspaper after the 1989 Loma Prieta earthquake.

InfoWorld's reviewer in 1983 called the computer "remarkable", praising its power relative to size and price and noting that he wrote the review "at the lofty height of 37,500 feet aboard a United DC-10". He concluded, "I'm not used to giving Radio Shack kudos, but the Model 100 is a brave, imaginative, useful addition to the realm of microcomputerdom" and "a leading contender for InfoWorld's Hardware Product of the Year for 1983", an award which it indeed won.

BYTE in 1983 described the Model 100 as "an amazing machine". While noting the lack of mass storage, the reviewer praised "one of the nicest keyboards I've used on any machine, large or small" and the "equally impressive" built-in software, and concluded "the designers of this machine ... should be congratulated". Dave Winer in 1984 described the 100 in the magazine as "the first useful portable computer", listing its screen, keyboard, and software as why it was "a breakthrough". The magazine later stated that "Tandy practically invented the laptop computer". PC Magazine criticized the Model 100 display's viewing angle, but noted that the text editor automatically reflowed paragraphs unlike WordStar. It concluded that the computer "is an ingenious, capable device ... an exciting example of the new wave of portable computers".

Your Computer magazine selected the Kyocera portable computer (including the Tandy, NEC and Olivetti models) as the best personal computer in its 1983 "Personal Computer of the Year" awards. Creative Computing said that the Model 100 was "the clear winner" in the category of notebook portables under $1000 for 1984, although cautioning that "the 8K version is practically useless".

== Aftermarket products ==
- DLPilot - allows a Palm OS PDA with a serial port to emulate a Tandy TPDD drive, providing affordable, compact, and portable storage that is easily synced to a desktop computer
- ReMem - replaces all the memory in the laptop, allowing the use of 4MB of flash ROM and 2MB of SRAM
- REX - memory subsystem that fits in the option ROM socket
- Tandy 200 RAM Module - adds 2 banks of 24kb to a T200
- NADSBox - New Age Digital Storage Box - Interfaces an SD media card using the Tandy TPDD drive protocol for portable storage and easy file transfers to a desktop computer using industry-standard FAT-formatted Secure Digital cards.
- PCSG's SupeROM - WriteROM word processor; FORM spreadsheet input template; LUCID spreadsheet; Database (relational); Thought outliner.
- Soigeneris Backpack - a small SD card ‘disk drive’ for a Model T that runs from a single AA battery
