= Computer Transceiver Systems, Inc. =

American computer company

- Type: Public
- Industry: Computer
- Founded: 1967; 59 years ago in Upper Saddle River, New Jersey, United States
- Founder: Allen G. Jacobson
- Defunct: 1998; 28 years ago
- Fate: Acquired by Vertex Industries in 1987 following Chapter 11 bankruptcy; spun off and acquired by Mortgage Plus Equity and Loan Corporation in 1998
- Headquarters: Paramus, New Jersey (1970–1987)
- Products: Execuport

Computer Transceiver Systems, Inc. (CTSI) was an American computer company active from 1968 to 1998. It manufactured a wide range of portable data terminals, portable computers, and printers for microcomputers under the Execuport name. It was originally based in Upper Saddle River, New Jersey, soon relocating to Paramus, New Jersey, where it spent most of its independent existence. The original Execuport was one of the first portable terminals on the market.

== History ==
=== Foundation (1969–1973) ===
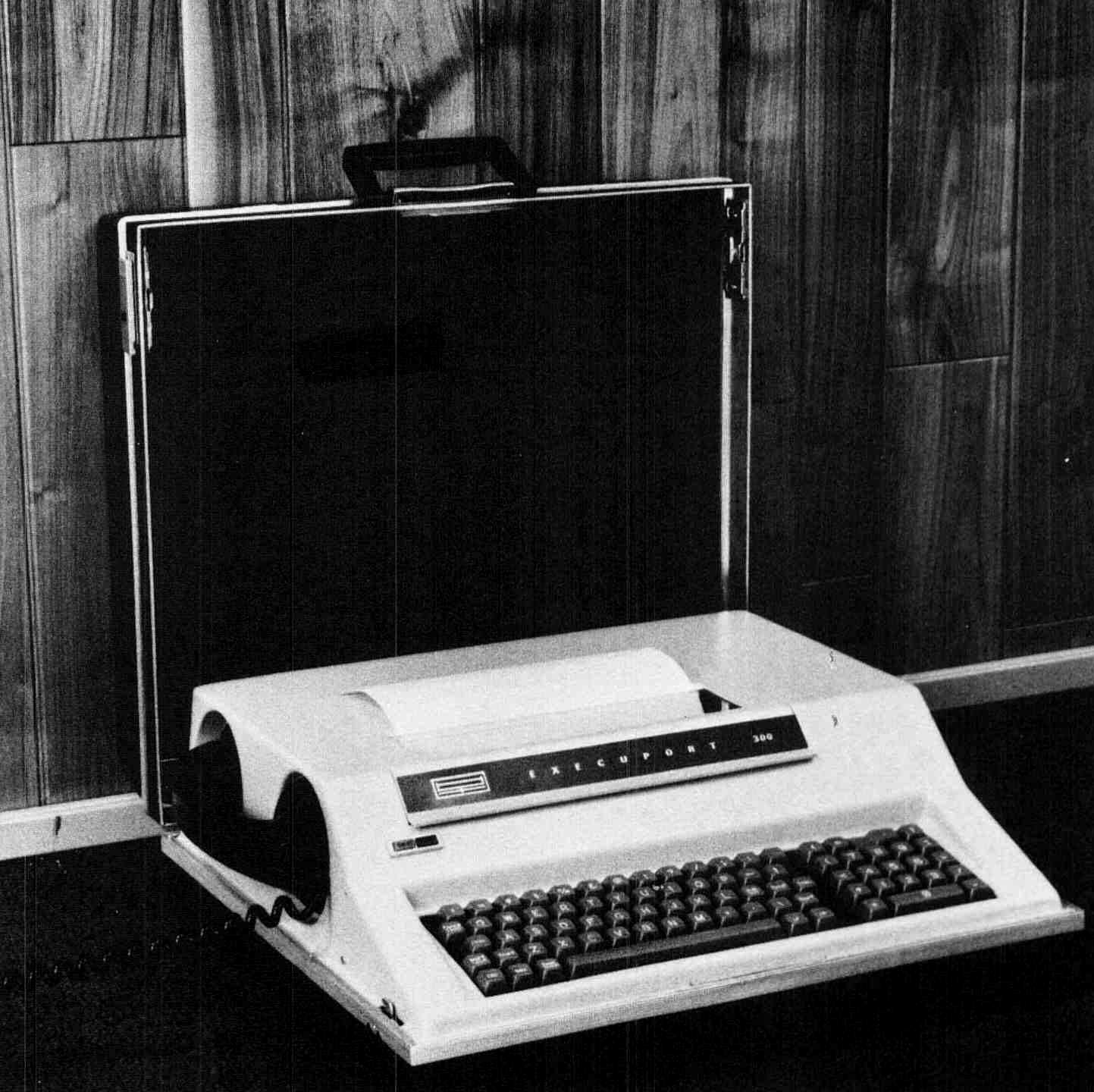
Execuport 300 portable terminal from 1969

Computer Transceiver Systems, Inc. (CTSI), was principally founded by Allen G. Jacobson in 1967, in Upper Saddle River, New Jersey. Before founding CTSI, Jacobson worked at various defense contractors after graduating from college, including the ITT Corporation, where he was employed in their Information Systems Division. Immediately after the completion of a command–control system commissioned by the Strategic Air Command, Jacobson and his fellow engineers at ITT were laid off. Following his dismissal, Jacobson went to work for Maxson Electronics, where he worked as an engineer on fire-control systems and warfare trainers. Jacobson disliked working for defense contractors and wanted to lean into the computer industry, seeing potential in the field of data communications. He was hired at Western Union's Processing Center in Middletown, Virginia, as a manager of engineering and design. There he familiarized himself with the technology behind telecommunications—namely telex and computer time-sharing.

Jacobson and a fellow engineer at Western Union found untapped potential in the market for teleprinters, over which the Teletype Corporation had a monopoly, especially with their flagship Teletype Model 33 introduced in the early 1960s. They saw the Model 33 as too clunky, of an era before the computer. The two devised a portable teletype in their spare time while developing the business acumen to start their own company. In order to gain knowledge of the economics of the telecommunications industry, Jacobson sought tasks at his work that emphasized accounting and budgeting and sought advice from coworkers, as well as his own father, who was a corporate lawyer. Jacobson and his business partner were able to persuade a group of venture capitalists to invest over $200 thousand in seed funding to found CTSI. Klein, his business partner, and three other engineers from Western Union left Virginia to found CTSI in New Jersey. Peterson was named president, joined by a corporate director, a marketing manager, and two engineers. Within a year, the company had dozens of employees on its payroll. While managing the company, Jacobson was also a volunteer pilot for the Civil Air Patrol. Between 1968 and June 1969, the company filed its initial public offering with the SEC.

The company's first product line was the Execuport, the company's brand of high-speed portable teletypes and terminals that were used to remote into the mainframe and minicomputers of the time. The flagship Execuport teletype weighs 27 pounds (12 kg) and has a letter-sized platen, a full-sized, alphanumeric keyboard, and an acoustic coupler for a modem to connect to the telephone network. The Execuport was developed in part by Jacobson and introduced in 1969. The first units of the Execuport were produced in mid-1969 from the company's production facilities in Upper Saddle River. The plot of land on which the production facilities rested also housed the company's research and development laboratories and executive offices.

Development and production of the Execuports was initially an amateur affair, with a prolonged prototyping phase and premature part failures. The Execuport's special thermal printing head (for which NCR Corporation was the only supplier) proved especially volatile. Beginning in July 1969, CTSI set up proper assembly lines for the manufacture of the Execuport, which improved yields. The company had another mishap with the development of a tape drive repurposed from surplus dictation machine parts, forcing the company to design the drive from the ground up.

The Execuport initially proved successful for CTSI, and the company's stock price reached an apex of $40, while the company employed 100 people. A plummeting of their stock price down to $3 in the beginning of the 1970 fiscal year, however, prompted a layoff of 40 workers. The company recovered shortly after, earning several major orders for models in the Execuport range. In the spring of 1970, CTSI moved its entire base of operations to Paramus, New Jersey, occupying a 41,000-square-foot (3809 m^{2}) building leased from Philips Norelco. The move to Paramus was completed in mid-1971; with it came a corporate reorganization that saw several new locals enter the executive team. In May 1972, the company partnered with North American Corporation to form a joint venture, Computer Transceiver Leasing Systems, which purchased and leased computer terminals to various corporate buyers.

=== Profitability (1973–1985) ===
CTSI faced losses of over US$302,400 in 1971 and $473,000 for the fiscal year 1972. The company reported its first profitable year in 1973, the netting income of over $119,400 on sales of $2.66 million (up from $1.76 million in 1972). This was following a marginal increase in share price and the sale of 550 units of Execuport Model 1200 terminals to Litton Industries in late 1972 worth $1 million. Said deal with Litton was part of a contract that allowed Litton to purchase up to $15 million worth of Execuport terminals through to 1977. CTSI's stock valuation increased apace from 1973 to at least 1977. The company remained largely profitable as well, netting over $120,000 between February and August 1976 and $182,700 in profit between the same period in 1977. Despite having the least amount of market share in the terminal industry, by 1976 they were tied with Digital Equipment Corporation for the best terminals on the market, according to an industry poll.

Following high executive turnover around the turn of 1978, the company reported their first quarterly loss since 1972 in late 1978. The company reported roughly $6 million in sales in 1981 and 1982. Their competitors around this time included market leader Texas Instruments (with their Silent 700 series of portable terminals), Teleram (with their Portabubble series of glass terminals), and 3M (with their Whisper Writer 1000 portable teletype). In 1982, the company beat out IBM, General Electric, and AT&T for the supply of networking hardware and terminals to the Federal Reserve Bank of New York.

In 1983, CTSI introduced the Execuport XL and Execuport XL+, a line of portable computers aimed at the high-end personal computer market. Both the XL and XL+ ran off of the Zilog Z80 and Intel 80186 microprocessors in unison; the XL+ added an additional 16-bit co-processor and 128 KB of RAM to the computer's base amount of memory. Both models of the Execuport featured dual 5.25-inch 800-kB floppy drives and a green-phosphor CRT display measuring 9 by 5 inches (23 by 13 cm) and displaying up to 132 columns by 24 rows. The computers were partially IBM PC compatible and ran MS-DOS and CP/M. In 1985, CTSI introduced a duo of general-purpose label printers for microcomputer systems, called the Execuport 2400 series.

=== Downturn, bankruptcy, and mergers (1985–1998) ===
CTSI employed around 60 individuals in 1985. In July 1985, the Federal Reserve Board delisted CTSI from the over-the-counter stock exchange for "failing to meet continued listing requirements", and in late 1986, CTSI filed for Chapter 11 bankruptcy. At the time they possessed $2.2 million in bank debts, $440,000 of which was owed to banks. In July 1987, they were acquired by Vertex Industries of Clifton, who invested $250,000 in the company and relinquished CTSI's bank debts. CTSI remained a subsidiary of Vertex until 1998. Founder Jacobson left the firm to work for Computer Integration Associates of Old Bridge in June 1988. In 1998, Vertex spun off CTSI, who subsequently merged with Mortgage Plus Equity and Loan Corporation of New York.
