= DAK Industries =

The DAK Catalog was published by DAK Industries, a discount electronics importer in the United States, and was named after the initials of the company's owner, Drew Alan Kaplan.

== Founding ==
DAK Industries was founded in 1966 and during the 1980s became a mail-order electronics firm based in Canoga Park, Los Angeles, California. A gadget enthusiast, Kaplan founded his business while studying psychology at UCLA. On the side, he sold reel-to-reel tapes and installed stereos.

Kaplan spent five years at UCLA, but never earned a degree, then went into business full-time, setting up shop in North Hollywood, Los Angeles, California, to sell recording tapes. The Los Angeles Times once called DAK "the L.L.Bean of consumer electronics", adding though that Kaplan was reclusive and rarely granted interviews, and refused to be photographed.

== 1980s ==
Before the Internet, companies like DAK relied on catalogs and print ads to generate sales and incurred high costs for printing and mailing. A large enterprise would have to create a great many catalogs to get sufficient sales. In 1985, Kaplan was involved in a lawsuit with his former printer, and court records show that he had ordered a run of 3.8 million catalogs.

By the late 1980s, DAK was a $120 million per year business with around 400 full-time workers. It was selling everything from radar detectors and stereo speakers to security lighting systems, hand-held photocopiers, and televisions with two-inch screens.

Kaplan's 1/4-inch-thick (6.4 mm) DAK catalogue was mailed across the United States and Canada, and its hallmark was the unusual first-person style of the ads, each with Kaplan's byline and with up to 1,400 words of text per page.

DAK was responsible for bringing a number of electronic gadgets previously unknown or little known in the US market to the public's attention; among these included an early bread making machine, and an early laptop computer, the Epson PX-8 Geneva.

== Bankruptcy ==
In 1992, DAK Industries filed a petition seeking relief under Chapter 11 of the U.S. Bankruptcy Code. DAK was forced to file for protection when Tokai Bank, a Japanese bank, suddenly pulled DAK's $18 million line of credit in August 1992. DAK continued in business until the case was converted to Chapter 7 in December 1994 and the company's inventory was liquidated.

Kaplan wrote on his website, "Well the truth is, in 1994 I lost DAK. And it closed. I really can't blame anyone but myself. I was behind the banking relationship. It was the beginning of the Asian Meltdown. As far as I can see, my bank decided to retrench and we lost our credit line. I had never been able to find an American bank that liked the high volume/low margin business I had built."

DAK's catalog mailing list and customer database was valuable and was sold during the bankruptcy proceedings to VentureDirect Worldwide. It was managed by Xactmail.com, a division of VentureDirect. Kaplan said it was not his buyers list, but a list of former DAK customers matched up against some other database.

== Microsoft dispute ==
During the bankruptcy case, computer software giant Microsoft lost a lawsuit against DAK Industries. It was a decision that has had significant implications for software licensors and also copyright license agreements under which distributors are given the right to sublicense or sell directly videos, theater or television rights, or other exploitations of intellectual property. Microsoft had sought to obtain payment from DAK for a non-exclusive software licensing agreement covering mostly its Word product.

The dispute was based on principles of bankruptcy law. A company in bankruptcy generally does not pay its debts while courts determine which creditors should get paid. But if that applied to all debts, no one would extend further credit to the company and it would be less able to administer the bankruptcy and ensure fair payment to its existing creditors. Therefore, bankruptcy law gives priority to new debts, incurred after filing of the bankruptcy, as part of administering the bankruptcy.

DAK continued to use a copyright license from Microsoft after filing bankruptcy and did not make royalty payments to Microsoft, classifying the money owed to Microsoft as just another debt so that Microsoft would have to compete with other creditors for payment. Microsoft contended that the ongoing use of the license constituted an administrative expense and extension of credit by Microsoft, so should have priority over previous debt.

The U.S. Court of Appeals for the Ninth Circuit held, however, that DAK's bankruptcy case was not entitled to priority as administrative expenses, and would instead be treated as non-priority general unsecured claims. Moreover, it found DAK as the debtor/licensee was not otherwise required to pay any administrative expense for its post-bankruptcy use of the license. Thus, DAK was not required to make any administrative payments to Microsoft, even though DAK made significant use of the copyright license following the Chapter 11 filing.

== Rising from the ashes ==
After a few years hiatus, Kaplan founded a successor business online, DAK 2000. He got back the website dak.com from the Drew Kaplan Agency, Inc. after a May 2000 arbitration. In 2012 Kaplan, now aged 66, sold the business to his longtime associate, Sol Harari, and retired from business altogether. Under Harari, DAK has continued to advertise electronics products using Kaplan's distinctive, personal and hyperverbal style. According to the company's current website, it is now located in Brooklyn, New York.
