= Canon X-07 =

Early personal computer made by Canon

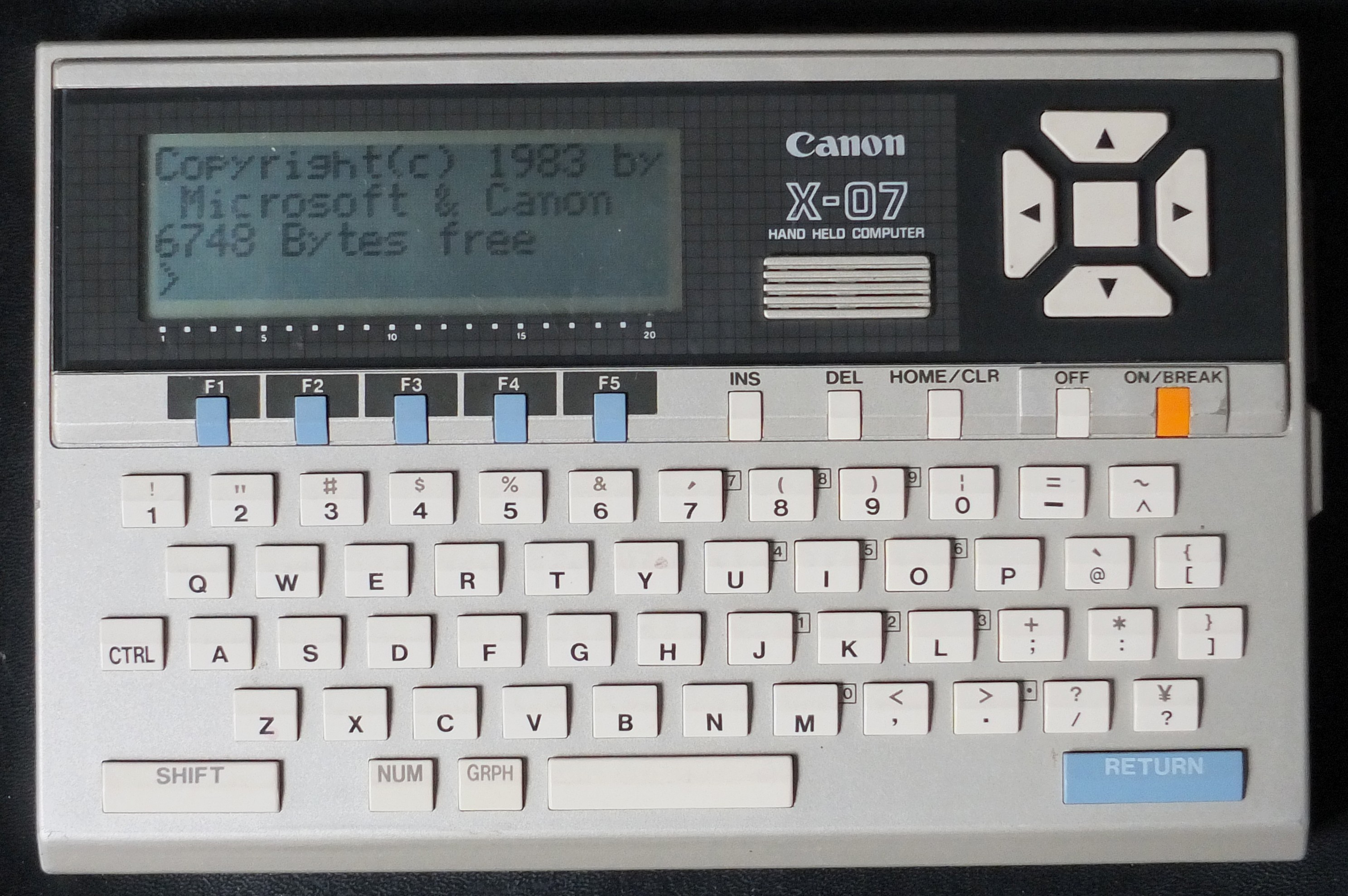
Canon X-07 (1983)

Canon X-07 was one of the first personal computers available in France manufactured by Canon. This is a laptop (or rather hand-held) based around the NSC800 (compatible with Z80) shipping Microsoft BASIC.

The specifications included:

- Memory extensions or independent IC card
- Parallel and serial port with an infrared extension X-721
- X-711 thermal printer or plotter 4-color X-710 or standard // printer.
- ROM card software (spreadsheet, monitor ...)
- X-720 video interface for connection to a TV
- Save to cassette
- Size: 20x13x2.7cm
