= Laser 50 =

The Laser 50 aka Laser-One is an educational portable computer sold by Vtech that ran the BASIC programming language. It was released in 1984.

== Specifications ==
The Laser 50 used a Zilog Z80 central processing unit running at 3.5 MHz, 2 kB to 18 kB of RAM, a 12 kB ROM, and an 80×7 dots LCD screen.
