= Double truck =

Pair of facing pages with content stretching over both

Double truck refers to a pair of facing pages, usually in a newspaper or magazine, with content that stretches over both pages.

In most newspapers and magazines, the booklet-like format is accomplished by folding large sheets of paper in half. This allows the pages to be opened like a book. Sometimes, usually only in magazines, the pages are stapled or stitched at the fold to hold the pages together.

Under this technique, each sheet of paper is actually four separate pages of the finished product. Two pages appear next to each other on the front of the sheet, with the other two likewise on the reverse side. Each time an additional sheet is added, the publication gains four additional pages. Because of this, most newspapers and publications are printed with page multiples of four.

This creates a rather confusing arrangement of pages. For example, in a 16-page newspaper, which uses 4 sheets of paper, the pages are arranged as follows:

- SHEET A FRONT: Pages 16 and 1
- SHEET A BACK: Pages 2 and 15
- SHEET B FRONT: Pages 14 and 3
- SHEET B BACK: Pages 4 and 13
- SHEET C FRONT: Pages 12 and 5
- SHEET C BACK: Pages 6 and 11
- SHEET D FRONT: Pages 10 and 7
- SHEET D BACK: Pages 8 and 9

These press sheets are known as printers pairs. In printers pairs the two pages that are next to each other should always add up to one more than the total number of pages in the finished product, that is if the first page starts with 1.

Notice how, in this example, the two middle pages, 8 and 9, will appear next to each other on the back of sheet D. This creates a double truck.

On a typical newspaper page, there is a margin on all four sides, say 1 inch all around. Obviously you don't want print running right against the edge of the paper, but you also don't want print to run into the fold or where the publication might be stapled. However, when the two pages meet in the middle like 8 and 9 in our example, this isn't a concern because both pages appear right next to each other and lie relatively flat.

In a double truck, the text and images on the pages crosses over the fold. This can create some eye-catching visual effects. For example, newspaper often use a double truck to display large illustrations, graphics, maps or photo collages, often in full color. Often double trucks are saved for special reports or in-depth graphical elements.

In addition, it is also possible to produce double truck advertisements, which are quite eye-catching as well. Typically, advertisers pay a premium price for such ads.

Although newspapers are most frequently published with page counts in multiples of four, it is possible to achieve page counts in multiples of two. To do this, a sheet of paper with only one page on each side is added often, but not always, in the center. This sheet, sometimes called a "dink," is half the size of a normal sheet because it doesn't have a mate next to it. Dinks are generally not used in magazines or bound publications because they cannot be held in place.

== Etymology ==
The name "double truck" comes from the days when the heavy forms for newspaper pages (the metal version of each page), largely filled with lead type, were rolled around the composing room floor on heavy carts called trucks. Two pages for one project meant a double truck.
