= List of Apple II clones =

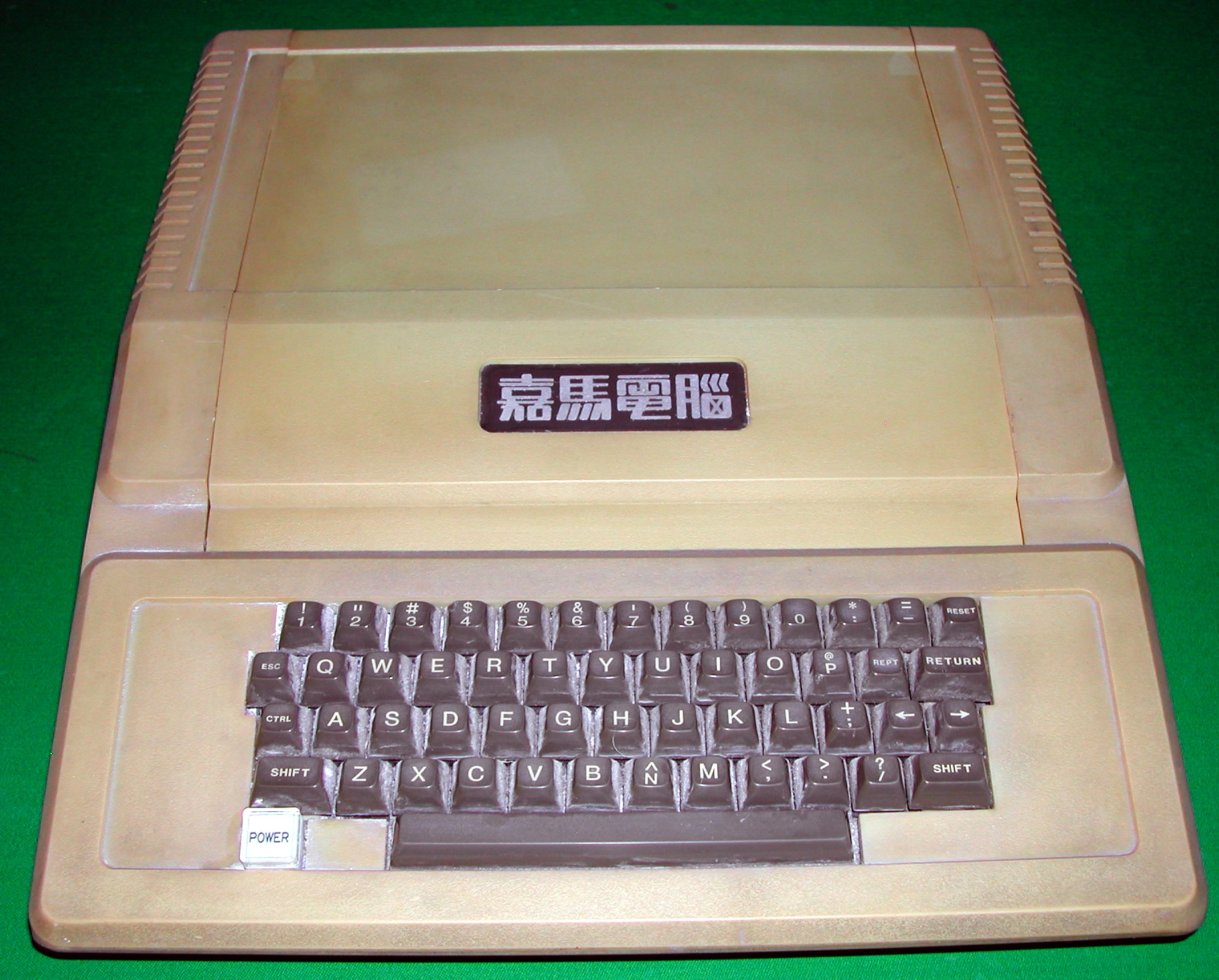
The Jiama (嘉馬) SPS-109, a Taiwanese clone of the Apple II, looks almost identical to the Apple II and II+, including an identical case, color, and keyboard layout. The only noticeable physical difference is the label above the keyboard.

Apple II clones are computers that share functionality with the Apple II line but were not created by Apple. The systems were cloned, both in the United States and abroad, in a similar way to the IBM PC. According to some sources (see below), more than 190 different models of Apple II clones were manufactured. Most could not be legally imported into the United States. Apple sued and sought criminal charges against clone makers in more than a dozen countries.

== Background ==
Many Apple II clones had fruit-related names, without explicitly stating that they were Apple II clones. An example was Pineapple, who Apple successfully forced to change its name to "Pinecom".

Agat was a series of Apple II compatible computers produced in the Soviet Union between 1984 and 1993, widely used in schools in the 80's. The first mass-produced models, the Agat 4 and Agat 7, had different memory layouts and video modes from Apple II, which made them only partially compatible with Apple II software.

Agats were not direct clones of Apple II, but rather uniquely designed computers based on 6502 CPU and emulated Apple II architecture. That helped developers to port Apple II software titles to Agat. A later model, the Agat 9, had an Apple II compatibility mode out of the box. Soviet engineers and enthusiasts developed thousands of software titles for Agat, including system software, business applications and educational software.

Bulgarian Pravetz series 8 was an Apple II clone with Cyrillic support.

Basis, a German company, created the Basis 108, a clone for the Apple II that included both a 6502 processor and the Zilog Z80, allowing it to run the CP/M operating system as well as most Apple II software. This machine was unusual in that it was housed in a heavy cast aluminum chassis. The Basis 108 was equipped with built-in Centronics (parallel) and RS232c (serial) ports, as well as the standard six Apple II compatible slots. Unlike the Apple II it came with a detached full-stroke keyboard (AZERTY/QWERTY) of 100 keys plus 15 function keys and separate numeric and editing keypads.

Another European Apple II clone was the Pearcom Pear II, which was larger than the original as it sported not eight but fourteen expansion slots. It also had a numerical keypad. Pearcom initially used a pear shaped rainbow logo, but stopped after Apple threatened to take legal action.

A Bosnian company named IRIS Computers (subsidiary of an electric company in Bosnia and Herzegovina and Yugoslavia’s ENERGOINVEST) produced Apple II clones starting in the early 1980s. Their official brand name was IRIS 8. They were very expensive and hard to obtain and were produced primarily for use in early computerized digital telephone systems and for education. Their use in offices of state companies, R&D labs and in the Yugoslav army was also reported. IRIS 8 machines looked like early IBM PCs, with a separate central unit accompanied by a cooling system and two 5.25-inch disks, monitor, and keyboard. Compatibility with the original Apple II was complete. Elite high schools in Yugoslavia and especially Bosnia and Herzegovina were equipped with clusters of 8, 16, or 32 IRIS 8 computers connected in a local network administrated by an IRIS 16 PC clone. Between 10,000 to 20,000 IRIS 8s are believed to have been produced.

An Australian-produced clone of the Apple II was the Medfly, named after the Mediterranean fruit fly that attacks apples. The Medfly computer featured a faster processor, more memory, detached keyboard, lower and upper case characters, and a built-in disk controller.

Until 1992 in Brazil, it was illegal to import microcomputers. Because of that, the illegal cloning industry of Apple II-based computers was strong there. In the early 1980s, there were around 20 different clones of Apple II Plus computers in that country, all of them using illegally copied software and hardware (since the Apple II and II Plus used commonly available TTL integrated circuits). Some of the names include Elppa ("Apple" spelled backwards), Maxtro, Exato MC4000 (by CCE), AP II (by Unitron), and even an "Apple II Plus" (manufactured by a company called Milmar, which was using the name illegally). There were only two clones of the Apple IIe, since it used custom IC chips that could not be copied, and therefore had to be reverse-engineered and developed in-country. These clones were the TK3000 IIe by Microdigital and Exato IIe by CCE. In addition, the Laser IIc was manufactured by Milmar and, despite the name, was a clone of the Apple II Plus, not of the Apple IIc, although it had a design similar to that of the Apple IIc, with an integrated floppy controller and 80-column card, but without an integrated floppy disk drive.

As of 1983 Franklin Computer Corporation's Ace computers were the only clones with substantial sales, with an estimated 50,000 units in 1983 compared to the Apple IIe's 650,000. Franklin copied Apple's ROMs and software and freely admitted to doing so. Franklin's response was that a computer's ROM was simply a pattern of switches locked into a fixed position, and one cannot copyright a pattern of switches. Apple fought Franklin in court for about five years to get its clones off the market, and was ultimately successful when a court ruled that software stored in ROM was in fact copyrightable in the US. (See Apple Computer, Inc. v. Franklin Computer Corp.) Franklin later released non-infringing but less-compatible clones; these could run ProDOS and AppleWorks and had an Applesoft-like BASIC, but compatibility with other software was hit-or-miss.

Apple also challenged VTech's Laser 128 in court. The Laser 128 (released in 1986) was an enhanced clone of the Apple IIc first released in 1984. This suit proved less fruitful for Apple, because VTech had reverse-engineered the Monitor ROM rather than copying it and had licensed Applesoft BASIC from its creator, Microsoft. Apple had neglected to obtain exclusive rights to the Applesoft dialect of BASIC from Microsoft; VTech was the first cloner to license it. The Laser 128 proved popular and remained on the market for many years, both in its original form and in accelerated versions that ran faster than 1 MHz. Although it was not fully compatible with the Apple II, it was close, and its popularity ensured that most major developers tested their software on a Laser as well as on genuine Apple machines. Because it was frequently sold via mail order and mass-market retailers such as Sears, the Laser 128 cut into the sales of low-cost competitors such as Commodore Business Machines as much as it did Apple's.

While the first Apple II clones were generally exact copies of their Apple counterparts that competed mainly on price, many clones had extra capabilities too. A Franklin model, the Ace 1000, sported a numeric keypad and lower-case long before these features were added to the Apple II line. The Laser 128 series is sometimes credited with spurring Apple to release the Apple IIc Plus; the built-in 3 1/2-inch drive and accelerated processor were features Laser had pioneered. The Laser 128 also had a IIe-style expansion slot on the side that could be used to add peripheral cards.

Bell & Howell, an audiovisual equipment manufacturer whose products (particularly film projectors) were ubiquitous in American schools, offered what appeared at first glance to be an Apple II Plus clone in a distinctive black plastic case. However, these were in fact real Apple II Plus units manufactured by Apple for B&H for a brief period of time. Many schools had a few of these Black Apples in their labs.

ITT made the ITT 2020, a licensed Apple II Plus clone, in the UK. It has the same shape as the Apple II but was matte silver (it was sometimes known as the "silver Apple") and was not an exact copy functionally. The ITT2020 produced a PAL video signal for the European market, where the domestic US market used NTSC. Software using the BIOS worked correctly on both the Apple and ITT, but software written to access the Apple's display hardware directly, bypassing the BIOS, displayed with vertical stripes on the ITT 2020. The Apple II itself was later introduced in the UK, and both the Apple II and ITT 2020 were sold for a time, the ITT at a lower price.

Syscom 2 Inc (from Carson City, NV) created the Syscom 2 Apple II+ clone. The case looked nearly identical. It had 48 KB of RAM and the normal expansion capabilities. These clones also supported lower case characters, toggled with a ^O keystroke.

An unknown company produced a clone called the RX-8800. One new feature it had was a numeric keypad.

The SEKON, made in Taiwan, had the same color plastic case as an Apple II, sported 48 KB of RAM standard, and a lower-uppercase switch, located where the power light indicator was typically situated on Apple II's. Additionally, it featured a 5-amp power supply which supplied ample power for add-on cards. SEKON avoided shipments being confiscated by US Customs, by shipping their computers without ROMs, leaving it to the dealers to populate the boards upon arrival to their private stores. Often these machines would boot up with a familiar logo of the Apple II after the dealers removed E-proms of original Apple ROMs and added them in. The reason for such activity was so that users could obtain a fully Apple-compatible clone for usually around US$600, as opposed to US$2500 from Apple.

Norwegian company West Computer AS introduced an Apple II clone West PC-800 in 1984. The computer was designed as an alarm center allowing use of several CPUs (6502, Z80, 8086, 68000) and operating systems.

=== Expansion cards ===
Although not technically a clone, Quadram produced an add-in ISA card, called the Quadlink, that provided hardware emulation of an Apple II+ for the IBM PC. The card had its own 6502 CPU and dedicated 80 K RAM (64 K for applications, plus 16 K to hold a reverse-engineered Apple ROM image, loaded at boot-time), and installed "between" the PC and its floppy drive(s), color display, and speaker, in a pass-through configuration. This allowed the PC to operate in a dual-boot fashion: when booted through the Quadlink, the PC could run the majority of Apple II software, and read and write Apple-formatted floppies through the standard PC floppy drive. Because it had a dedicated processor, rather than any form of software emulation, this system ran at nearly the same speed as an equivalent Apple machine.

Another company, Diamond Computer Systems, produced a similar series of cards called the Trackstar, that had a dual pair of 6502 CPUs, and ran Apple II software using an Apple licensed ROM. The original Trackstar (and "128" and "Plus" model) was Apple II Plus compatible, while the "Trackstar E", Apple IIe compatible. The original offered 64K of usable Apple II RAM, while the other models 128K RAM (192K is on board, with the additional memory reserved for the Trackstar itself). The original Trackstar also contained a Z80 CPU, allowing it to run both Apple DOS and Apple CP/M software, however the newer Trackstar models did not, and thus dropped CP/M compatibility. The Trackstar also had a connector allowing use of an actual Apple floppy drive, which enhanced its compatibility with software that took advantage of Apple hardware for copy-protection.

== North American clones ==
=== United States ===
- Albert
- CompuSource Abacus
- CompuSource Orange Peel
- Collins Orange+ Two
- Formula II kit ("Fully compatible with Apple II+")
- Franklin Ace series
- InterTek System IV
- Laser 128
- MicroSCI Havac
- Micro-Craft Dimension 68000
- Sekon
- Syscom 2
- Unitronics Sonic

=== Canada ===
- Apco
- Arcomp
  - Super 400
  - Super 800
- CV-777
- Golden II (Spiral)
- Logistics
  - Arrow 1000
  - Arrow 2000
- Mackintosh
- Microcom II+
- Microcom IIe
- MIPC
- O.S. Micro Systems
  - OS-21
  - OS-22
- Orange Computers Orangepeel
- Peach Microcomputer
- QCAL
  - QCAL 500
  - QCAL 600
  - QCAL 700
  - QCAL 900
  - QCAL 980
  - QCAL 1000

== Brazilian clones ==
- CCE
  - MC-4000 - Page in Portuguese (Exato Pro)
  - MC-4000 //e - Page in Portuguese (Exato IIe)
- Del MC01 - Page in Portuguese (Unreleased Apple II+ clone)
- Microcraft Craft II Plus
- Microdigital
  - Microdigital TK2000 Color (not 100% binary-compatible)
  - Microdigital TK2000 II Color (not 100% binary-compatible)
  - Microdigital TK-3000 IIe - Page in Portuguese
  - Microdigital TK-3000 //e System
  - Microdigital TK-3000 //e Compact
- Micronix Dactron E - Page in Portuguese
- Polymax Maxxi - Page in Portuguese
- Spectrum Equipam. Eletrônicos Ind.Com.Ltda
  - Spectrum ED - Page in Portuguese (Apple IIe)
  - Spectrum Microengenho I - Page in Portuguese (Apple II)
  - Spectrum Microengenho II - Page in Portuguese (Apple IIe)
- Unitron (not to be confused with the Taiwanese Unitron, the makers of the infamous U2000 and the U2200 systems)
  - Unitron APII - Page in Portuguese
  - Unitron APII TI
- D-8100 (Dismac)
- Victor do Brasil Eletrônica Ltda
  - Elppa II Plus (1983)
  - Elppa II Plus TS (1983)
  - Elppa Jr. (1984)
- Micronix Ind. e Com.de Computadores ltda
  - Dactron
  - Dactron E
- DGT AT (Digitus Ind.e Com.Serv.de Eletrônica Ltda - 1985)
- DM II (D.M. Eletrônica Ltda - 1983)
- Link 323 (Link Tecnologia - 1984)
- Maneger I (Magenex Eletrônica Ltda - 1983)
- Maxxi (Polymax Sistemas e Periféricos Ltda - 1982)
- Ômega - Ind e Com. Ltda
  - MC 100 (1983)
  - MC 400 (1984)
- MG-8065 (Magenex Eletrônica Ltda - 1983)
- (Milmar Ind. e Com. Ltda)
  - Apple II Plus (1983)
  - Apple II TN-1 (1984)
  - Apple II Senior (1984)
  - Apple II Master (1984)
  - Apple Laser IIc (1985)

== Chinese and Taiwanese clones ==
=== China ===
- China Education Computer
  - CEC-I
  - CEC-M
  - CEC-G
  - CEC-E
  - CEC-2000
- Venus II Series (Apple II+ Clone)
  - Venus IIA
  - Venus IIB
- ChangJiang-I (Apple II+ Clone)
- DJS-033 Series (Apple II+ Clone)
- DJS-033e Series (Apple IIe Clone)

=== Hong Kong ===
- ACC 8000 (a.k.a. Accord 8000)
- Basis Medfly
- CTC (Computer Technologies Corporation)
  - Wombat
  - Wombat AB
  - Wombat Professional
- Pineapple Computers
  - Pineapple 48K Color Computer (or "ananas")
  - Pineapple DP-64E
- Sprint 1000 (a.k.a. XT-80)
- Teleco Electronics
  - ATEX 2000 Personal Computer
- VTech (Video Technology)
  - Laser 128
  - Laser 3000

=== Taiwan ===
- AP Computer
  - BAT 250
- BOSS-1 (with dual CPU, 6502 and Z80)
- Chia-ma SPS-109
- Chin Hsin Industrial
  - RX-8800
- Copam Electronics
  - Base 48
  - Base 64
  - Base 64A
  - Base 64D
- Fugu Elite 5
- Golden Formosa Microcomputer
  - Golden II
- Happy Home Computer Co.
  - Multi-System
- I.H. Panda
  - CAT-100
  - CAT-200
  - CAT-400
- IMC
  - IMC-320
  - IMC-480
  - IMC-640
  - IMC-640E
  - IMC-2001 (with officially licensed DOS 3.3 from Apple; after battle in court IMC Taiwan got an agreement with Apple to officially license them DOS 3.3)
  - IMC Fox
  - IMC Junior
  - IMC Portcom II
- Lazar II
- Mitac
  - LIC-2001A/LIC-2001 (Little Intelligent Computer)
  - LIC-3001 (Little Intelligent Computer)
- Multitech
  - Microprofessor II (MPF II)
  - Microprofessor III (MPF III)
- Panda 64
- Rakoa Computer
  - Rakoa I
- SMC-II MCAD (Microcomputer Aided Design System)
- Sages Computer Zeus 2001
- Surwave Electronics
  - Amigo 202
  - Amigo 505
- The Jow Dian Enterprise
  - ZD-103 (The ZD 8/16 Personal Computer)
- Unitron U2000
- Unitron U2200

== European clones ==
=== Austria ===
- Zema Twin

=== Bulgaria ===
- IMKO-1
- IMKO-2
- Pravetz series 8
  - Pravetz 82
  - Pravetz 8A
  - Pravetz 8M
  - Pravetz 8E
  - Pravetz 8C (produced as late as 1994)

=== France ===
- 3CI Robot (non-Apple II clone, but comes with a dedicated cash register for hairdressing salons)
- TMS Vela (TMS means Troyes Micro Service)

=== Germany ===
- Basis Microcomputer GmbH
  - Basis 108
  - Basis 208
- Blaupunkt
  - Blaupunkt Apple II
- Citron II
- CSC Euro 1000
- CSC Euro Plus
- CSC Euro Profi
- CSC Euro Super
- ComputerTechnik Space 83
- ComputerTechnik SK-747/IBS Space-83
- Eurocon II
- Eurocon II+
- ITT 2020 (Europlus)
- Precision Echo Phase II (Basis 108 with a light milk chocolate brown case)

=== Greece ===
- Gigatronics KAT

=== Italy ===
- Asem AM-64e
- Selcom Lemon II
- Staff C1

=== The Netherlands ===
- AVT Electronics
  - AVT Comp 2
- Computer Hobbyvereniging Eindhoven
  - CHE-1
- Pearcom
  - Pear II

=== Norway ===
- West PC-800

=== Poland ===
- Lidia

=== Spain ===
- Katson
- Katson II

=== Yugoslavia ===
- Ananas
- Marta kompjuteri

== Israel ==
- General 48A
- General 64A
- RMC Kosmos 285
- Spring (sold, inter alia, in Israel)
- Winner 64K
- Elite //E

== East Asian clones ==
=== Japan ===
- Akihabara Japple
- Honda Computers (also known as Pete Perkins Apple) it used a custom Vectorio motherboard with a custom user EPROM socket (shown on Thames Television in 1984)
- Wakou Marvel 2000

=== Singapore ===
- Creative Labs CUBIC-88
- Creative Labs CUBIC-99
- Lingo 128 Personal Computer

=== South Korea ===
- Hyosung PC-8000
- Sambo TriGem20
- Sambo Busicom SE-6003
- E-Haeng Cyborg-3
- Zungwon HART
- Champion-86XT
- Sanho ACME 2000

== Australian clones ==
- Dick Smith Cat (VTech Laser 3000)
- Energy Control 128. Came with a 128k ROM with Forth built in. Needed a hardware modification to run ProDos.

== Soviet clones ==
- Agat
  - Agat-4
  - Agat-7
  - Agat-8
  - Agat-9

== Unknown models ==
- Bannana Banana
- CB-777 (confiscated by Apple Computer)
- CV-777
- REON
- TK 8000 (confiscated by Apple Computer)

== Other models ==
- AES easy3
- AMI II
- Aloha 50
- Aton II
- Bimex
- Elppa II
- General 64
- Iris 8
- Ivel Z3
- Lingo 8
- MCP
- Mango II
- Mind II
- Multi-system computer
- Orange
- Shuttle (computer)
- Space II
- Tiger TC-80A

=== Plug-in Apple II compatibility boards ===
- Apple IIe Card (Macintosh LC)
- Diamond Trackstar (IBM PC)
  - Trackstar
  - Trackstar 128
  - Trackstar Plus
  - Trackstar E
- Mimic Systems Spartan (Commodore 64)
- Quadram Quadlink (IBM PC)
- Titan III (Apple III)
  - III Plus II
  - III Plus IIe
