= Pravetz 82 =

Bulgarian model of personal computer

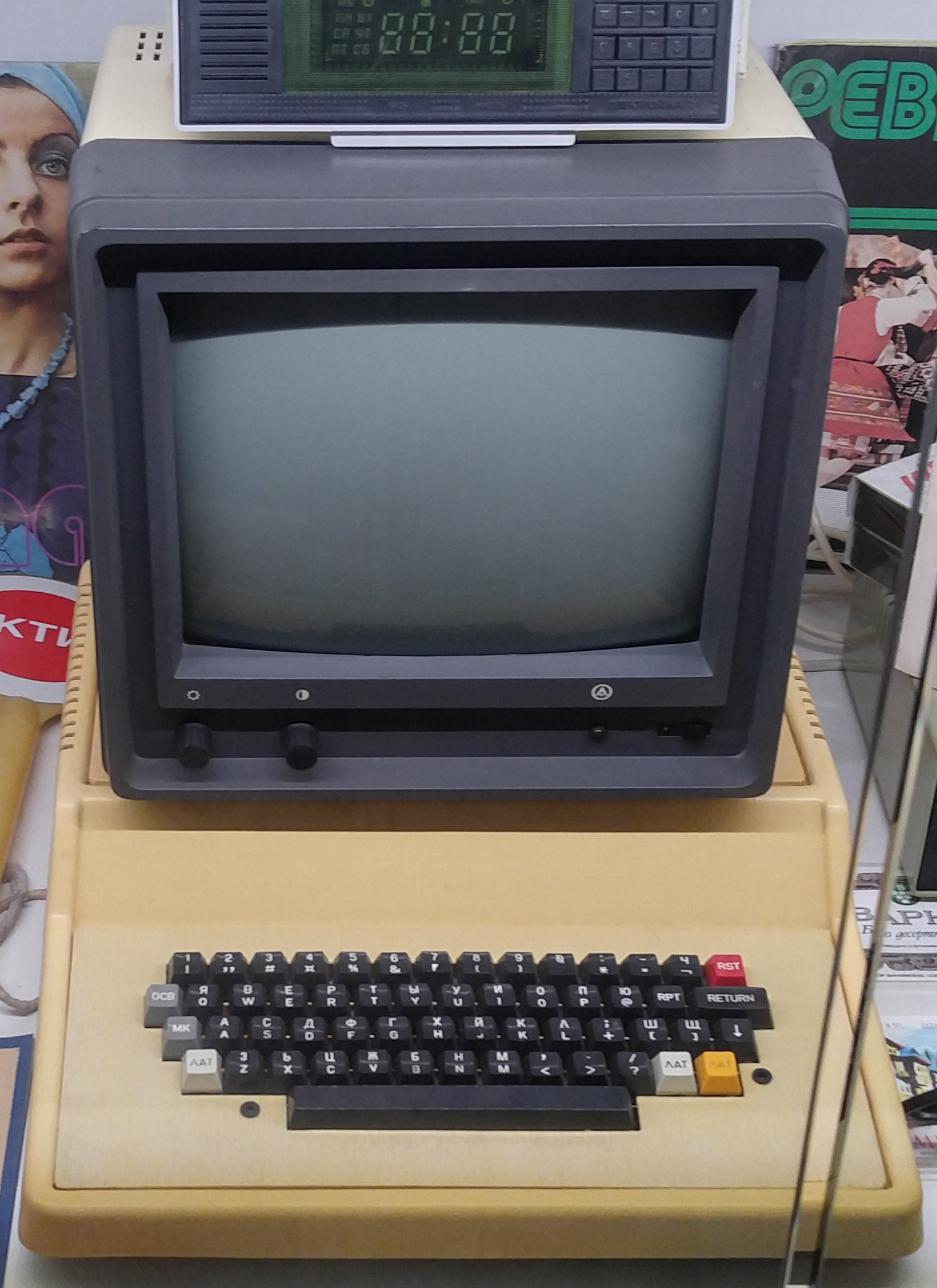
- Manufacturer: Pravetz
- Type: Personal Computer
- Released: 1983; 43 years ago
- Introductory price: 4190 Levs, approx $2600
- Media: Cassette tape initially, later Floppy disks
- CPU: 8-bit MOS Technology 6502 clocked at 1 MHz
- Memory: 48 KB on-board RAM, expandable to 64 KB with language card; 12 KB ROM
- Display: 280×192 resolution, 6 on-screen colours out of a palette of 16
- Dimensions: 40 × 48 × 16 cm (15.7 × 18.9 × 6.3 in.)
- Weight: 8 kg (17.6 lbs)
- Predecessor: IMKO-1
- Successor: Pravetz 8a

The Pravetz 82 (Bulgarian: Правец 82), previously IMKO-2 (Bulgarian: ИМКО-2) was the first serially manufactured personal computer in Bulgaria and first in the Pravetz series 8 range of computers. It was produced in the eponymous town of Pravetz. As the other computers in the series, it is an Apple II clone.

== History ==
After the success of the limited series of the IMKO-1 throughout various scientific institutions in Bulgaria, its developer Ivan Marangozov initiated development of a new model aimed for serial production.

=== The IMKO-2 prototype development ===
While IMKO-1 was based on the Apple II personal computer, the next prototype IMKO-2 was developed as a clone of Apple II Plus, although the keyboard design stayed close to the original Apple II model, rather than the Plus keyboard. At the time, clones of the Apple II series were already widespread around the world. The abbreviation IMKO stands for "Individual Micro Computer" (Bulgarian: Индивидуален микро компютър), as with its predecessor.

In 1982 experimental small series assembly of IMKO-2 units was organised by the Institute for Technical Cybernetics and Robotics (ITKR) (Bulgarian: ИТКР) of the Bulgarian Academy of Sciences in their production base in Iskar, Sofia. Initially, only about 50 units were manufactured for testing the feasibility for mass production.

=== Serial manufacturing in Pravetz ===
After feasibility of the serial production has been proven by the ITKR, the first choice of the state planners was the Silistra factory for electronic calculators ELKA—Factory for Organisational Technology (Orgtechnica). Meanwhile, the Orgtechnica's chairman Rumen Raichev was sent to prison, due to intrigues by the local party elite in Silistra, so the idea for computer assembly in Silistra did not materialise.

The next choice of the Bulgarian Ministry of Electronics proved to be successful. It was the Electronic Devices Factory (Bulgarian: Прибостроителен завод) in Pravetz, where Ivan Marangozov was supported by Christo Christov, one of the engineers there, to introduce the new product in the factory. The serial manufacturing started in 1982. Soon after the new product made its premiere at the Technical Expo of the International Fair Plovdiv.

After release, the computer was shipped mainly to educational institutions. Hundreds of thousands of units were shipped until 1986. Large quantities were exported to the other Comecon countries through the Eastern Bloc.

=== Later series of IMKO-2 ===
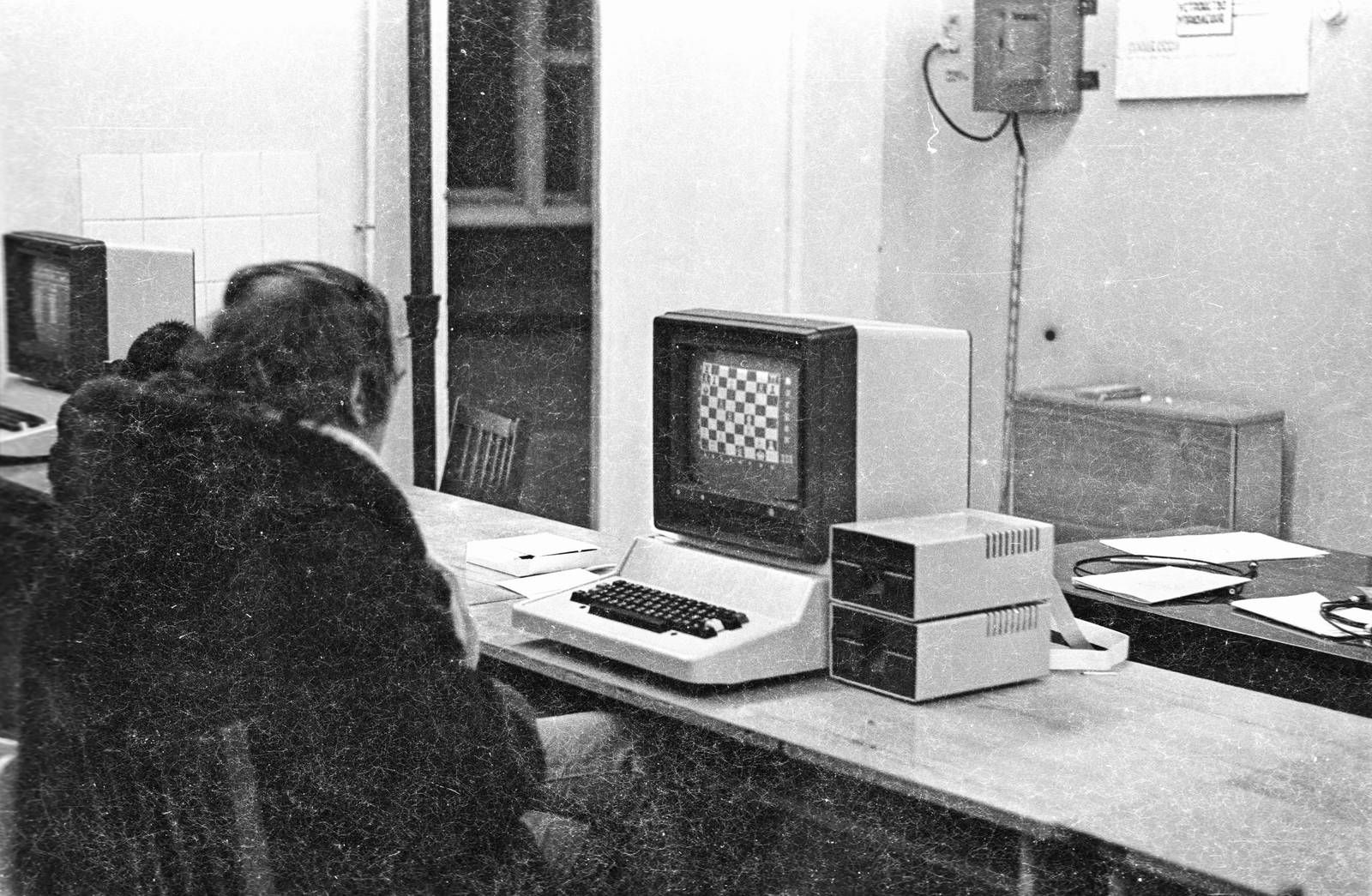
Pravetz 82 computer in a classroom in USSR in 1985

Even after the start of serial production in the Pravetz factory, ITKR continued manufacturing limited series under the mark IMKO-2, to be sold to scientific institutes and universities.

== Features ==
This model is an analogue of the Apple II Plus and had similar features with the notable exception of the case, the Cyrillisation of the keyboard and the upgrade to the respective keyboard circuits.

It has yellow plastic case and black keyboard with red RESET key. The later revisions used switching power supplies. ROM and schematics were not changed and were identical to those of the Apple II, while a lot of the chips used were Bulgarian and Soviet substitutes (clones) of the original chips. Pravetz 82 was relatively reliable—most of the hardware problems were due to the widespread use of substandard quality IC sockets, mainly used for the DRAM chips.

=== Processor ===
The computer uses the omnipresent CPU for that age, the 6502 by MOS, clocked at 1 MHz—the same processor as in the Apple II series of computers. Some series have 6502 CPUs produced by Synertek under license from MOS Technology.

=== Memory ===
- Memory (RAM): 48 KB RAM on board, with the possibility to extend to 64 KB by installing the so-called language card. This solution is identical to that used in Apple II Plus.
- Memory (ROM): 12 KB.
- Disk drives: No disk drives were available initially, only cassette recorder Unitra MK232 connected via a cassette player port; later on a 5.25-inch floppy drives were provided, connected through the respective connectivity card in one of the extension slots, a solution identical to that in Apple II Plus.

=== Expandability ===
Similarly to Apple II Plus, it offers wide options for expansion through one cassette player port and 8 expansion card slots. The zero slot was used for attaching the so-called language card for extra memory up to the 64 kB limit.

=== Display ===
In text mode the display size is 40×24 columns/rows, while in graphics mode the screen resolution is either 280×192 pixels in 6 colours, or 280×160 pixels with 4 text rows, 40×40 pixels with 4 text rows, or 40×48 pixels in 16 colours. Most of the units were initially shipped along with Sofia 31 TV set as monitor.

=== Keyboard and case ===
Keyboard design stayed closer to the original Apple II model, rather than the slightly mofified keyboard design of the Apple II Plus model. it has integrated 56 keys ASCII keyboard with built-in Cyrillic support. As all computers of the Pravetz series this model provided hardware support for Cyrillic alphabet, visualised in its Russian typeface variation both on the keys and on the screen.

The keys layout and overall design of the keyboard follows the keyboard layout of Apple II and Apple II Plus, with the characteristic RESET key in upper right in red colour. It differs however from the Apple key layout with lack of the power light on the left side of the space bar and the arrow keys, which were replaced with switch between Cyrillic and Latin. The Cyrillisation utilises phonetic key placement. Another difference is the 8-bit keyboard circuit board that allows for the hardware Cyrillisation. Because the Apple II keyboard was using 7 bits for transmitting the character codes the Cyrillic letters were overlapping the lower case Latin letters and it was only possible to type with uppercase Latin or Cyrillic letters. The two arrow keys for moving the cursor in two directions horizontally, left and right were not present in the mass-produced Pravetz 82.

The case also visibly differs from Apple II or Apple II Plus. Its design was inspired by the vacuum plastic forming technology of some contemporary French manufacturer.

=== Software ===
The computer uses version of Applesoft BASIC on board, same as Apple II Plus. It also utilises Apple DOS to connect to the floppy drives through an expansion card.

=== Pravetz 83 variation ===
Pravetz 83 was released in 1984 with upgraded keyboard, adding arrow keys for moving the cursor in two directions horizontally, left and right. Similar key arrangement was made for the later series of the IMKO-2 manufactured in limited quantities by the ITKR after the mass production of Pravetz 82 has already started.

== See also ==
- Apple II clones
- Apple II Plus
- Pravetz series 8
