= Pravec =

Pravec could mean:

- Petr Pravec, a Czech astronomer
- Pravec, Bulgarian computers produced from 1979 until the early 1990s
- Pravec, a town in central-western Bulgaria
