= Laser 128 =

Apple II clone

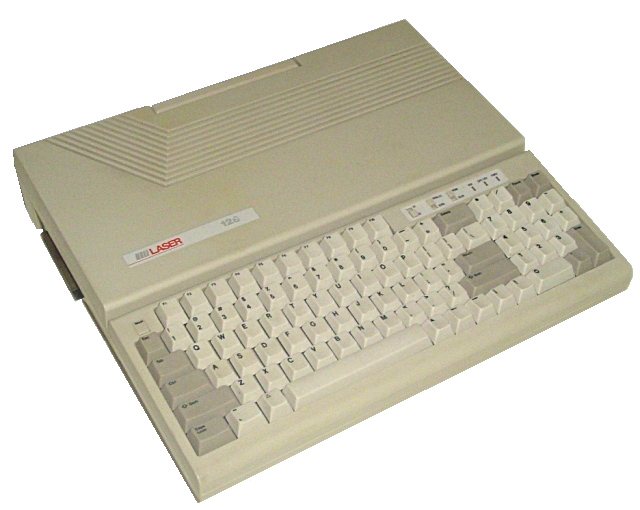
- Laser 128
- Manufacturer: VTech
- Type: Personal Computer
- Released: 1986; 40 years ago
- Introductory price: US$479 (equivalent to $1,410 in 2025)
- Media: floppy disk
- Operating system: Applesoft BASIC
- CPU: 65C02 @ 1 MHz
- Memory: 128 KB of RAM
- Removable storage: 5¼-inch floppy disk drive
- Display: Apple's IIc flat panel or RGBI interface; 15-pin D-sub video port; 560 x 384
- Graphics: 128 KB of dedicated video RAM
- Input: keyboard
- Controller input: 2-button joystick
- Connectivity: Centronics printer port, expansion slot
- Backward compatibility: Apple II

The Laser 128 is an Apple II clone, released by VTech in 1986 and comparable to the Apple IIe and Apple IIc.

== Description ==
VTech Laser 128 has 128 KB of RAM. Like the Apple IIc, it is a one-piece semi-portable design with a carrying handle and built-in 5¼-inch floppy disk drive, that uses the 65C02 microprocessor, and supports Apple II graphics. Unlike the Apple IIc, it has a numeric keypad, Centronics printer port, and 128 KB of dedicated video RAM. The 15-pin D-sub digital video port is compatible with Apple's IIc flat panel display, but unlike the IIc, Laser 128's port is also RGBI interface compatible with an adapter cable. The first 128 model has a proprietary 560x384 video mode removed in later units.

Laser 128 has a single expansion slot for Apple II peripheral cards, which gives it better expansion capabilities than a IIc, but cards remain exposed; the slot is intended for an $80 expansion chassis with two slots compatible with the Apple IIe's Slot 5 and Slot 7. The computer also has an internal memory-expansion slot, requiring a card that allows up to 1 MB of additional RAM that can be used as a RAM disk. Laser 128EX and 128EX/2, also expandable by 1 MB, come with the memory expansion card.

== Models ==
Model	Release date	CPU	Drive	Price
Laser 128	1986	1 MHz	5¼-inch	$479
Laser 128EX	1987	3.6 MHz	5¼-inch	$499
Laser 128EX/2	1988	3.6 MHz	5¼-inch	$499
Laser 128EX/2	1988	3.6 MHz	3.5-inch	$549

== History ==
As of 1983, Franklin's Ace computers were the only Apple II clones with substantial sales in the US. Unlike IBM, which usually did not pursue makers of IBM PC compatibles, Apple Computer aggressively sued clonemakers, such as Apple Computer, Inc. v. Franklin Computer Corp. (1983).

Announced in early 1986, VTech sold the Laser 128 in the US at a suggested retail price of $479, while Central Point Software sold it by mail for $395; by comparison, the Apple IIe sold for $945 in April 1986. Apple—already suing VTech regarding the also Apple-compatible Laser 3000—filed a lawsuit to stop distribution of the 128, but VTech obtained United States Customs approval to export the Laser 128 to the United States in 1986, and the lawsuit reportedly had no effect on demand for the computer. Central Point—the most prominent dealer—sold the Laser 128 and accessories with full-page magazine advertisements, saying that "a computer without expansion slots is a dead-end that stays behind as technology advances". It advertised the Laser 128 in Commodore computer magazines; the name was, Central Point president Mike Brown said, "chosen to sound like the Commodore 128", and the company intended to appeal to those who wanted to use the large Apple software library with a computer that cost the same as the comparable Commodore. By late 1986, other mail-order firms also sold the Laser 128, and at least one peripheral maker advertised its product's compatibility with the clone.

By 1988, VTech had purchased a majority share in Central Point Software and formed Laser Computer, Inc., as a division of the company. It ended Central Point's mail order sales of the 128, only selling through dealers such as Sears. inCider magazine wrote that year that "Laser will never sell as many computers or have as big a distribution network as Apple, but there's no doubt that the 128 [has] won a place in the Apple market, and irritated Apple in the process". VTech subsequently released the Laser 128EX (1987), with a 3.6 MHz CPU, and the $549 Laser 128EX/2 (mid-1988), with a 3.5-inch disk drive and MIDI port. (A $499 version of the 128EX/2 with a 5.25-inch drive was available.) Apple soon released the Apple IIc Plus.

== Compatibility ==
While the Franklin clones were discontinued after the company lost Apple's lawsuit, VTech reverse-engineered the Apple Monitor ROM using a clean room design rather than copying it, and licensed an Applesoft BASIC-compatible version of Microsoft BASIC. Apple carefully studied the Laser 128 but was unable to force the clone off the market.

Despite its physical resemblance to the IIc, software sees the Laser 128 as an enhanced IIe with 128 KB RAM and Extended 80-Column Text Card. Apple said in 1984 that the IIc was compatible with 90% of all Apple II software. Central Point said in 1986 that testing had found that only Choplifter, David's Midnight Magic, and Serpentine did not run on the clone, because of Broderbund's copy protection. "We think it safe to surmise that the latest and best software is 90 percent likely to run on the Laser 128", InfoWorld wrote in 1986. Compatible software included AppleWorks, Quicken, Apple Writer, VisiCalc, Flight Simulator II, The Print Shop, and Where in the World is Carmen Sandiego?, sometimes with slightly different colors. 12% of 129 tested software packages were incompatible, mostly educational software or games. While incompatible with some hardware, the magazine wrote that the expansion slot and parallel port let the Laser 128 use other products which were incompatible with the IIc. inCider called the computer "amazingly Apple-compatible", estimating 95% compatibility. Programs that successfully ran on the Laser 128 included F-15 Strike Eagle, Fantavision, WordPerfect, and The Hitchhiker's Guide to the Galaxy, and the magazine wrote that it was easy to install $25 upgraded ROM chips if necessary to improve compatibility. A+ similarly found that the computer was compatible with 28 of 30 popular Apple II programs, while only about half worked with the Franklin Ace. BYTE wrote that expansion cards worked properly but the magazine found "mixed results" with software compatibility, stating that "graphics programs I tested revealed flaws in the Laser 128's compatibility with both the Apple IIc and II+". The Laser 128's popularity ensured that most major software companies tested their software on the Laser as well as on Apple hardware.

Licensing BASIC greatly reduced the amount of code that had to be reimplemented. Applesoft BASIC constitutes the largest and most complex part of an Apple II's ROM contents. Microsoft made most of its money by retaining the rights to the software that it sold to others. Like IBM with PC DOS, Apple did not have an exclusive license for the Applesoft dialect of BASIC, and VTech was free to license it. Much Apple software depends on various machine code routines that are a part of BASIC in ROM.

== Reception ==
InfoWorld in May 1986 stated that "we can see why" Apple opposed the Laser 128's importation to the United States. It stated that other than the keyboard feel, the computer's external features (the expansion slot, numeric keypad, and Centronics port) improved on the IIc. Given the high degree of compatibility and a price less than half that of the IIc, the magazine concluded that the Laser 128 "is a real bargain." Writing that "it's cheap and it works", inCider in December 1986 stated that the Laser 128 "[deserved] a look from anyone considering a Commodore. Or, to be blunt, anyone considering an Apple IIc." The magazine also disliked the keyboard's feel and called the computer "homely", but concluded that "The Laser is a remarkably compatible, competent performer. The Apple market isn't known for hardware bargains, but it has one now."

BYTE in January 1987 preferred the Laser 128's keyboard, including the keypad and cursor keys' locations, to that of the Apple IIc and approved of the documentation's quality. Despite describing the software incompatibility issues as "disappointing" the magazine concluded that its "technical issues are relatively minor", and that its low price made the computer "perfect for someone looking for a second computer or an inexpensive first computer that runs the largest pool of software available today."

inCider in November 1988 stated that the Laser 128EX/2 "has everything you can possibly put into an 8-bit Apple II ... in terms of standard equipment, it's more than a match for the IIc Plus." The Apple product was faster (4 MHz vs 3.6 MHz), and the $126 difference in price between the two computers was much smaller than the IIc's $300+ premium over the Laser 128, but the 128EX/2's memory was more easily expandable, important to AppleWorks users. The magazine concluded that while the "128EX/2 is a slick machine, the most fully loaded II compatible you can buy", the 5 1/4-inch version of the EX/2—or the older EX for those who did not need a 3 1/2-inch drive—"may be bargain hunters' best bet."
