= IMKO-1 =

- Manufacturer: Pravetz
- Type: Personal Computer
- Released: 1980; 46 years ago
- Media: Cassette tapes
- Operating system: None
- Memory: 48KB-64KB RAM, 12KB ROM
- Display: 280×192 resolution, 6 on-screen colours out of a palette of 16
- Dimensions: 39 × 45 × 12 cm (15.4 × 17.7 × 4.8 in.)
- Successor: IMKO-2 (Pravetz 82)

The IMKO-1 (Bulgarian: Индивидуален микро компютър (ИМКО-1), Individualen Micro KOmputer, Individual micro computer) was the first Bulgarian personal computer, built in 1979 in Pravetz, Bulgaria. It was the first in the Pravetz series 8 range of computers. As the other computers in the series, it is an Apple II clone.

== History ==
The development of the first Bulgarian microcomputer started back in 1979 at the Institute for Technical Cybernetics and Robotics (Bulgarian: ИТКР).

The prototype of the Pravetz computers were developed by engineer Ivan Vassilev Marangozov. IMKO-1 was a nearly identical clone of the original Apple II with a few minor exceptions - case, keyboard, character table (the lower case Latin alphabet was replaced with Cyrillic upper-case), as well as the power supply (early models used bulky and heavy linear power supplies). A few early models were produced at the ITKR (pronounced ee-teh-kah-reh, Institute of Technical Cybernetics and Robotics), a section of the Bulgarian Academy of Sciences. Industrial production in Pravetz started shortly after.

The first working samples were manufactured in 1980. The abbreviation IMKO stands for "Individual Micro Computer". This model is an analogue of the Apple II Plus and only about 50 units were manufactured for testing purposes.

== Features ==
Start of production: 1980.
End of production: 1981.
CPU: MOS 6502, 1 MHz.
Memory (RAM): 48 KB (with the possibility to extend to 64 KB).
Memory (ROM): 12 KB.
Disk drive: No disk drives available, only a cassette player port.
Operating system: None.
Screen resolution: Text mode 40×24 (columns/rows), graphics mode 280×192 pixels - 6 colours, 280×160 pixels + 4 text rows, 40×40 pixels + 4 text rows, 40×48 pixels in 16 colours.
Variations: None.
Notes: Manufactured as an experimental model at the Institute for Cybernetics and Robotics at the Bulgarian Academy of Science. It was well accepted due to its low price for its time as well as due to its universal features and ease of use. It was first presented to the foreign audience in 1981 at the symposium on robotics in England as part of the demonstration of a robot arm (ROBKO-01).
At that time the robots in Japan and the USA were controlled by minicomputers, not microcomputers like IMKO-1 and this demonstration was a real success as the whole system cost tens of times less than the Japanese or American analogues. As all computers of the Pravetz series this model has hardware Cyrillic support, but because the keyboard was using 7 bits for transmitting the character codes the Cyrillic letters were overlapping the lower case Latin letters and it was only possible to type with upper-case Latin or Cyrillic letters.
Ports/slots: Cassette player port, 8 expansion slots. The zero slot was used for attaching extra memory up to the 64KB limit.
Manufacturer: ITCR - Sofia.
Price: N/A (never sold).
