= CompuSource =

American computer company

CompuSource Compatible Systems Inc.
- Type: Private
- Industry: Computer
- Founded: December 1982; 43 years ago in Minneapolis, Minnesota
- Founder: Joel Ronning
- Products: Apple II clones

CompuSource Compatible Systems Inc. was a short-lived privately held American computer company active in the 1980s and based in Minneapolis. It sold a variety of clones of the Apple II, including one portable that was also an IBM PC compatible and a CP/M machine. The company's first product, the Orange Peel, was the subject of a customs seizure in 1983, though the company was later cleared of wrongdoing.

== History ==
CompuSource was incorporated in December 1982 and co-founded by Joel Ronning in Minneapolis, Minnesota. The computer's first product was an Apple II clone called the Orange Peel. Ronning commissioned original equipment manufacturer Orange Computers, out of Toronto, to manufacture the computer. It was able to run software for the Apple II but had slightly altered capabilities; as well, it used a custom ROM that was a clean-room design of Apple's BIOS for the Apple II.

Around 95 Orange Peel units worth US$76,000 were sold between late 1982 and early 1983, before the computer was the subject of a confiscation at the Minneapolis–Saint Paul International Airport in February 1983, when guards of the U.S. Customs Service seized four units from a cargo plane coming from Toronto. Executives of Apple had appealed to the Customs Service to look out for potential counterfeits of Apple's products in the years prior; almost 2,000 such counterfeits had been confiscated up to that point in total. Ronning stated that the Orange Peel did not contain any of Apple's copyrighted code nor infringed on Apple's trade dress, with an entirely different external appearance and detachable keyboard. Customs eventually cleared CompuSource of any wrongdoing in March 1984, calling the incident a mistake, but by that point Orange Computer had dissolved, and CompuSource moved on to another supplier. The company continued selling the remaining inventory of Orange Peels, at roughly $300, down from $795 in 1983 (both prices being a fraction of what Apple charged for their Apple IIs at the time).

Shortly after CompuSource lost its first appeal against Customs in August 1983, the company switched to a different supplier of hardware for their next family of clones. Called the Abacus, these computers were manufactured by General Fabrication Corporation of Forest Lake. The Abacus comprised both a standard desktop computer and a portable computer, the latter with a built-in 9-inch CRT monitor and keyboard. Both were compatible with software written for the Apple II and for CP/M; the company licensed Apple DOS 3.3 from Apple and CP/M 2.2 from Digital Research. Ronning was able to avoid charges of patent infringement by deviating from Apple's floppy controller card for the Disk II and schemes to generate artifact color on composite video signals.

Optional for both Abacus machines were a memory expansion card, a clone of the 80-Column Text Card, and an IBM PC compatibility card. The latter contained the circuitry needed to run software designed for the IBM PC running MS-DOS, including an Intel 8088 microprocessor. IBM compatibility was somewhat constricted by the Abacus' RAM ceiling of 192 KB. (CompuSource had been in negotiations with Microsoft to license MS-DOS for the computers but failed to get a contract by the computer's launch date.) The computers came with Compucalc, Compuword, and Compubase, spreadsheet, word processor, and database software respectively—all developed by ArtSci of Los Angeles—as well as three video games.

The Abacus portables were introduced to market in January 1984, with the first 100 units delivered to 100 different dealers for inspection that month. CompuSource achieved volume production around February, manufacturing around another 15,000 in the following months. The Abacus portables were optioned with one or two floppy drives; a 10-MB hard disk option was planned for mid-1984.
