= Albert (computer) =

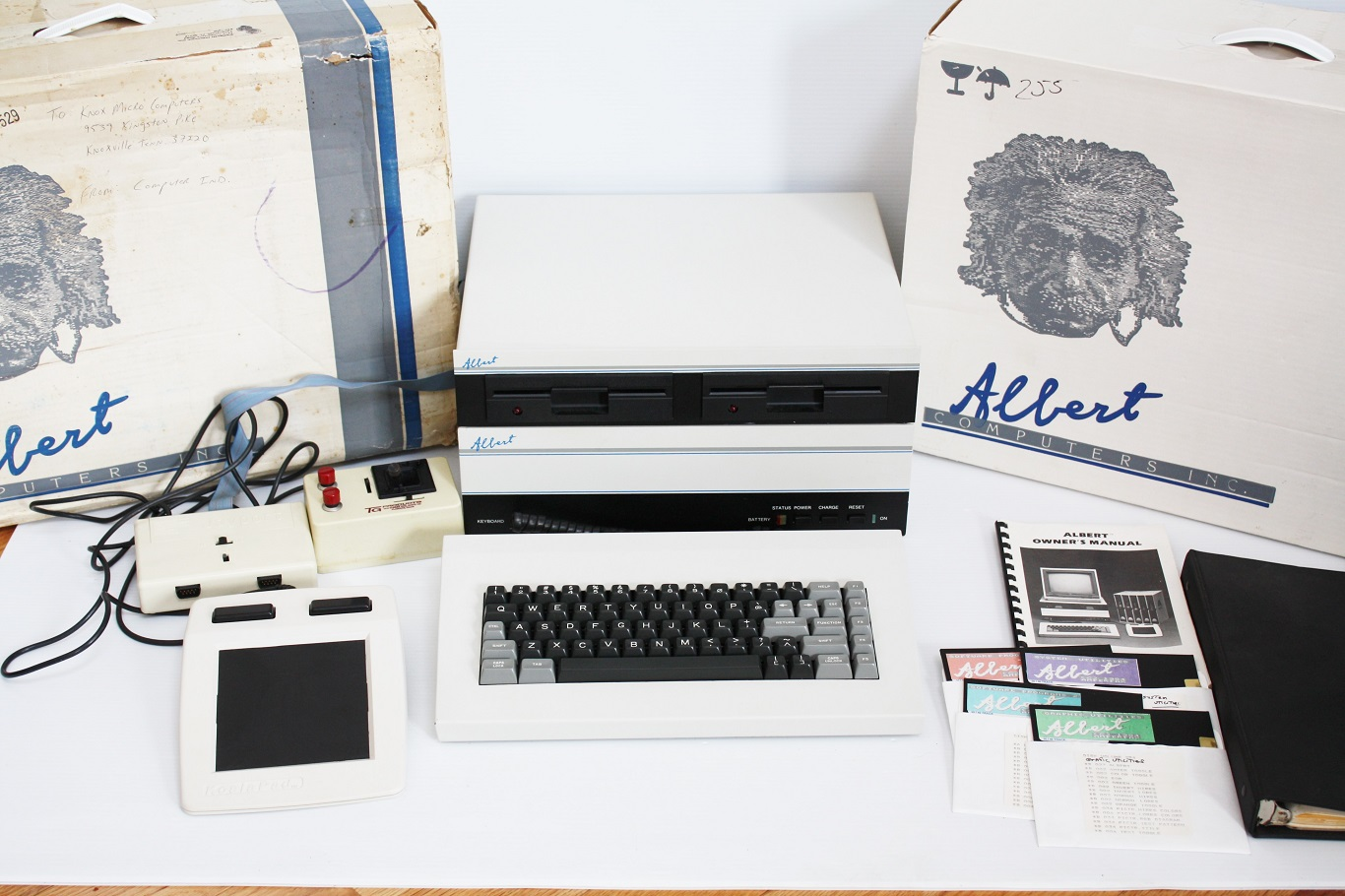
- Complete Albert computer package
- Manufacturer: Albert Computers, Inc.
- Released: 1983; 43 years ago
- CPU: MOS 6502A at 1 MHz
- Memory: 64 KB DRAM standard, expandable to 192 KB

The Albert is an Apple II clone released by Albert Computers, Inc., in 1983. Six models, comparable to the Apple IIe, were ultimately produced.

== Description ==
Albert Computers, Inc. offered a "complete system" for approximately the price of a basic Apple IIe. This included 64k of RAM (192k max), upper and lower case, 256 colors (as opposed to the Apple IIe's 16 colors), enhanced graphics, Analog RGB support, serial and parallel ports, a graphics digitizer tablet, voice recognition, a software package (including word processor, spreadsheet, data manager, mailing list, word speller), 110/220v AC/DC power, and even an integrated battery backup (option).

The Albert had an unusual "two-piece design" which the company termed "stereo" styling.

== History ==
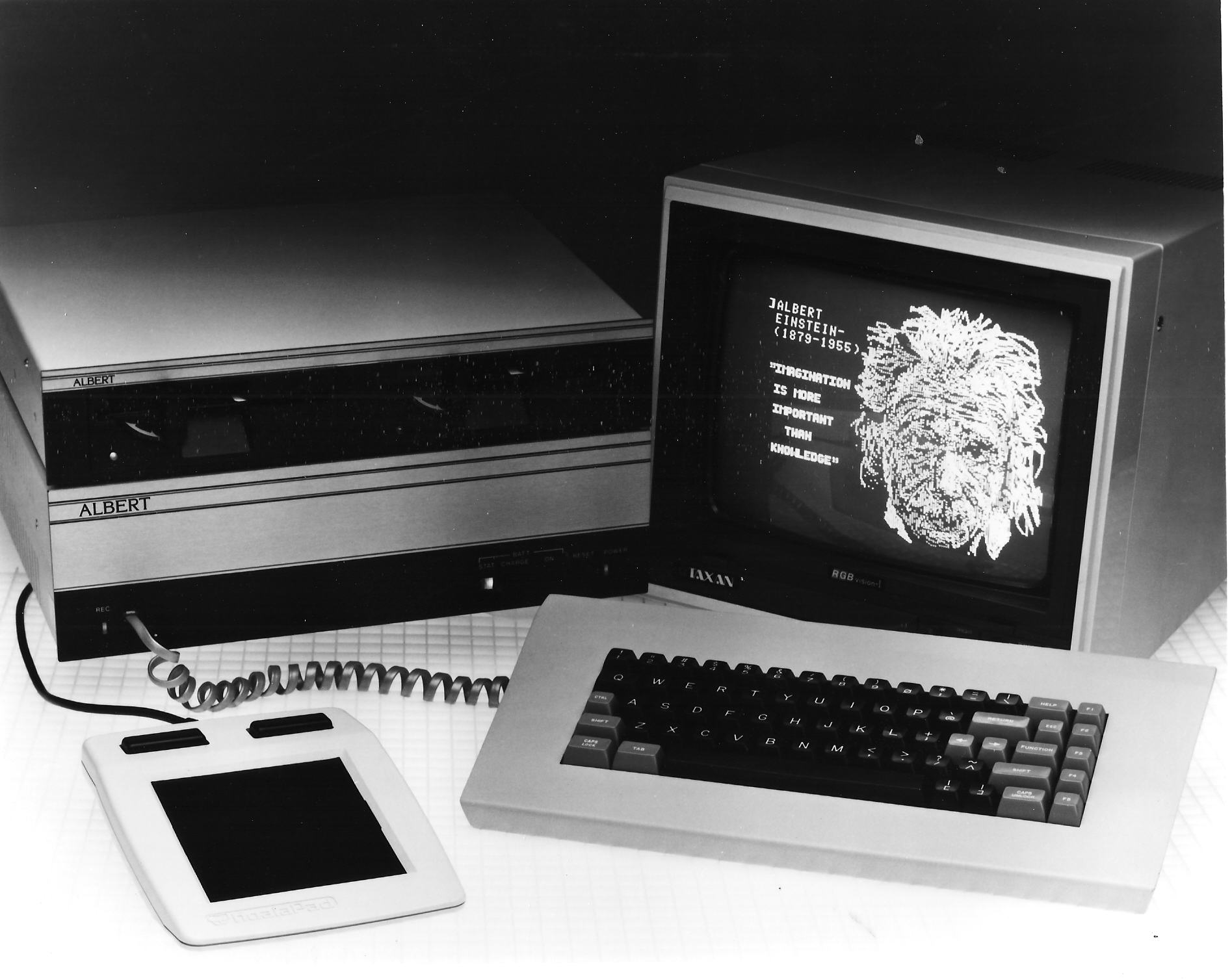
Albert computer system, 1983

Albert Computers, Inc., based in Thousand Oaks, California, modeled its line of Apple clones on the Apple IIe and aimed at home and business consumers.

The company, which insisted that the Albert was not an Apple clone but an improvement, said, "It’s a next-generation computer with more than a dozen advanced hardware features and software capabilities."

The base model of the Albert was $1,595, while the base price of the Apple IIe was $1,395. The options that came standard with the Albert were over $3,000.

Albert's marketing featured an image of Albert Einstein and copy which read: "When you're ready to buy a personal computer, it's easy to see why Albert is smarter than Apple." However, Albert Computers, Inc. quickly ran afoul of Apple Computer, Inc., which sued for copyright infringement.

== Models ==
Model	Release date	CPU	Video	Price
Albert	1983	6502	16 colors	$1,595
Express	1983	6502 and Z80	256 colors	$695
Executive	1983	6502 and Z80	256 colors	-
Professional Executive	1983	6502, Z80, 8088	256 colors	-
Pup	1983	6502 (Z80 coprocessor optional)	256 colors	$499
Profex Portable	1984 (?)	6502, Z80, 8088	256 colors	-

== Specifications ==
=== Video display ===
Display modes

- 40-column text, 5x7 dot matrix
- 80-column text, 5x7 dot matrix, monitor (optional with 128 KB RAM expansion)
- Low-resolution color graphics
- High-resolution color graphics
- RGB and composite monitor outputs

Text capacity

- 24 lines by 40 columns
- 24 lines by 80 columns (optional with 128 KB RAM expansion)

Character set

- 96 printable ASCII characters, upper- and lowercase

Character formatting

- Normal
- Inverse
- Flashing

Low-resolution graphics

- 6 on-screen colors (from 256 selectable colors)
- 48 H × 48 V resolution
- 48 H × 40 V with 4 lines of text

High-resolution graphics

- 6 on-screen colors (from 256 selectable colors)
- Color-selectable text and background
- 280 × 192 px resolution (6 colors)
- 140 × 192 px resolution (16 colors)

=== Processing ===
CPU

- 1 MHz 6502A 8-bit microprocessor with 16-bit address bus

Registers

- Accumulator (A)
- Index registers (X, Y)
- Stack pointers (P)

Register size

- 8-bits

Data bus

- 8-bits

Address bus

- 16-bits

Address range

- 65,536 (64K)

=== Memory ===
Standard memory

- 64 KB of dynamic RAM
- Expandable on the motherboard to 192 KB

Programmable storage

- 64 KB RAM

Read-only memory

- 2 on-board ROM sockets

=== I/O ===
- Detached typewriter-style keyboard
- Microphone input
- 8-ohm speaker
- Output speaker jack
- Amplifier with volume control
- Video display output (composite color or programmable RGB)
- RS-232 serial port
- Parallel printer port
- Serial printer port
- RS-432/422 (links to Ethernet via network gateway connector)
- 5 expansion slots (fully buffered with interrupt and DMA priority structure)

Hand control (gaming) I/O signals (16-pin DIP)

- Annunciator outputs: 4
- Strobe: 1
- Switch inputs: 3
- Analog inputs: 4
- Ground and +5 V
- Soft-switched

Analog-to-digital converter inputs

- Analog inputs: 6 (8)
- Annunciator outputs: 4
- Switch inputs: 3
- Ground and +5 V
- Soft-switched

Digital-to-analog converter outputs

- 8-bit digital/analog converter
- Real-time clock: month, day, hour, minutes, seconds

=== Power requirements ===
Line

- 110 to 220 VAC ～, or 8 to 32 VDC

Battery

- 12 VDC
- 1.2 ampere-hours

(All specifications standard except as indicated.)
