= ELKA =

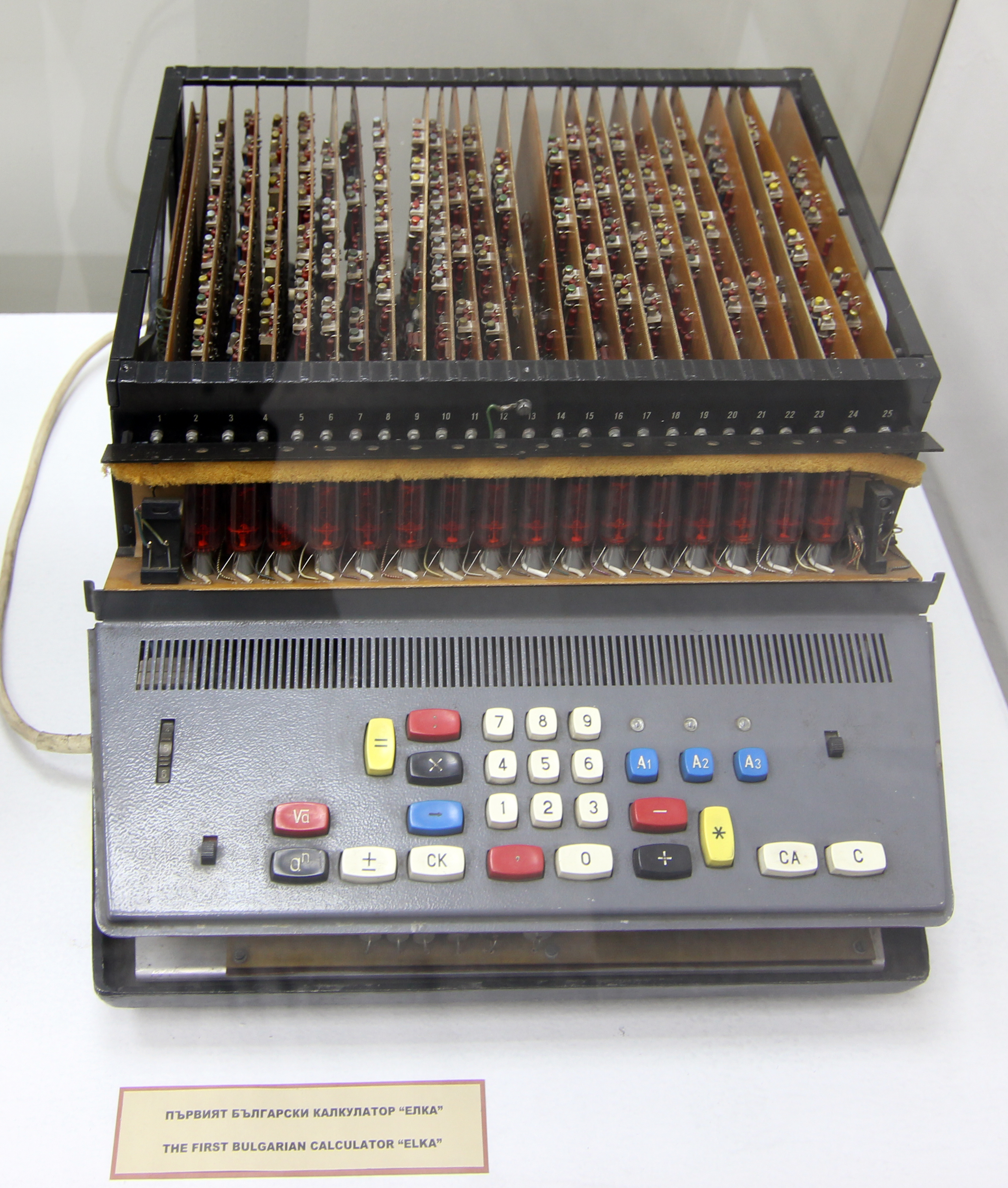
The ELKA 6521

ELKA (Bulgarian: ЕЛКА) is a Bulgarian brand of electronic calculator, developed by the Central Institute for Computation Technologies and built at the Elektronika plant in Sofia. The name is a contraction of електронен калкулатор, or "electronic calculator", and the word elka has, by extension, become the generic name for a calculator in Bulgaria.

The first model, the ELKA 6521, was introduced in 1965, shipped from 1966, and used germanium transistors and a nixie tube display. It weighed 16 kg and although some Bulgarian authors claim that it was the first calculator in the world to include a one-key square root function it was preceded in this respect by several models from American and Japanese manufacturers. Its developers—Lyubomir Antonov, Petar Popov and Stefan Angelov, were the first scientists in the field of electronics to win the highest honour in Bulgaria at the time, the Order of Georgi Dimitrov.

Later, the models ELKA 22 (again, with a nixie tube display) and ELKA 25, (with a built-in printer) were developed. These models had a plastic case and were based again on discrete technology, their numerous phenolic boards being populated with hundreds of transistors, diodes and resistors, plus a magnetic-core memory. Their experimental production began in 1966. These two models proved successful and in 1967 their serial production began in earnest by the Factory for Organizational Technology in Silistra.

In 1969, the Scientific research, study and design institute for electronic calculators was founded specifically for the design of calculators. In 1972 this developed the lighter and more portable, but still relatively large calculator models ELKA 40 and ELKA 42 built around integrated circuits (medium-scale integration). These had again nixie tube displays. Later models in the 1970s were the ELKA 50 and ELKA 1300, which had a similar outward appearance and used vacuum-fluorescent tube displays and relatively expensive but very reliable reed-switch keyboards. Meanwhile, the ELKA 77 was the first electronic cash register.

The first pocket model was the ELKA 101, introduced in 1974. This was the first in a large series, including the scientific ELKA 135. Other models in the 100 series included the ELKA 103, 105, 131 and 130M. These were all designed with export in mind, so all writing on them is in Latin script. The 100 series came in three bright colours, orange, green and yellow, and their displays could be either red or green.

As of 2013 the factory in Silistra, now named "Orgtehnika", still produces mostly vending oriented machines branded ELKA: cash registers, electronic scales, taxi meters, etc.

== See also ==
- Pravetz computers
