= Franklin Electronic Publishers =

American manufacturer based in New Jersey

- Logo of the company doing business as Franklin Computer
- Formerly: Franklin Computer Corporation
- Company type: Public
- Founded: 1981; 45 years ago in Burlington County, New Jersey, United States
- Founder: Barry Borden; Russell Bower; Joel Shusterman
- Parent: Saunders Acquisition Corporation
- Website: www.franklin.com

Franklin Electronic Publishers, Incorporated (formerly Franklin Computer Corporation) is an American consumer electronics manufacturer based in Burlington, New Jersey, founded in 1981. Since the mid-1980s, it has primarily created and sold hand-held electronic references, such as spelling correctors, dictionaries, translation devices, medical references, and Bibles. It was publicly traded on the American Stock Exchange under the symbol FEP until September 30, 2009, when it merged with Saunders Acquisition Corporation.

== History ==
Franklin was founded in 1981 by Barry Borden, Russell Bower, and Joel Shusterman as Franklin Computer Corporation. It manufactured clones of the Apple II, which it first marketed in 1982.

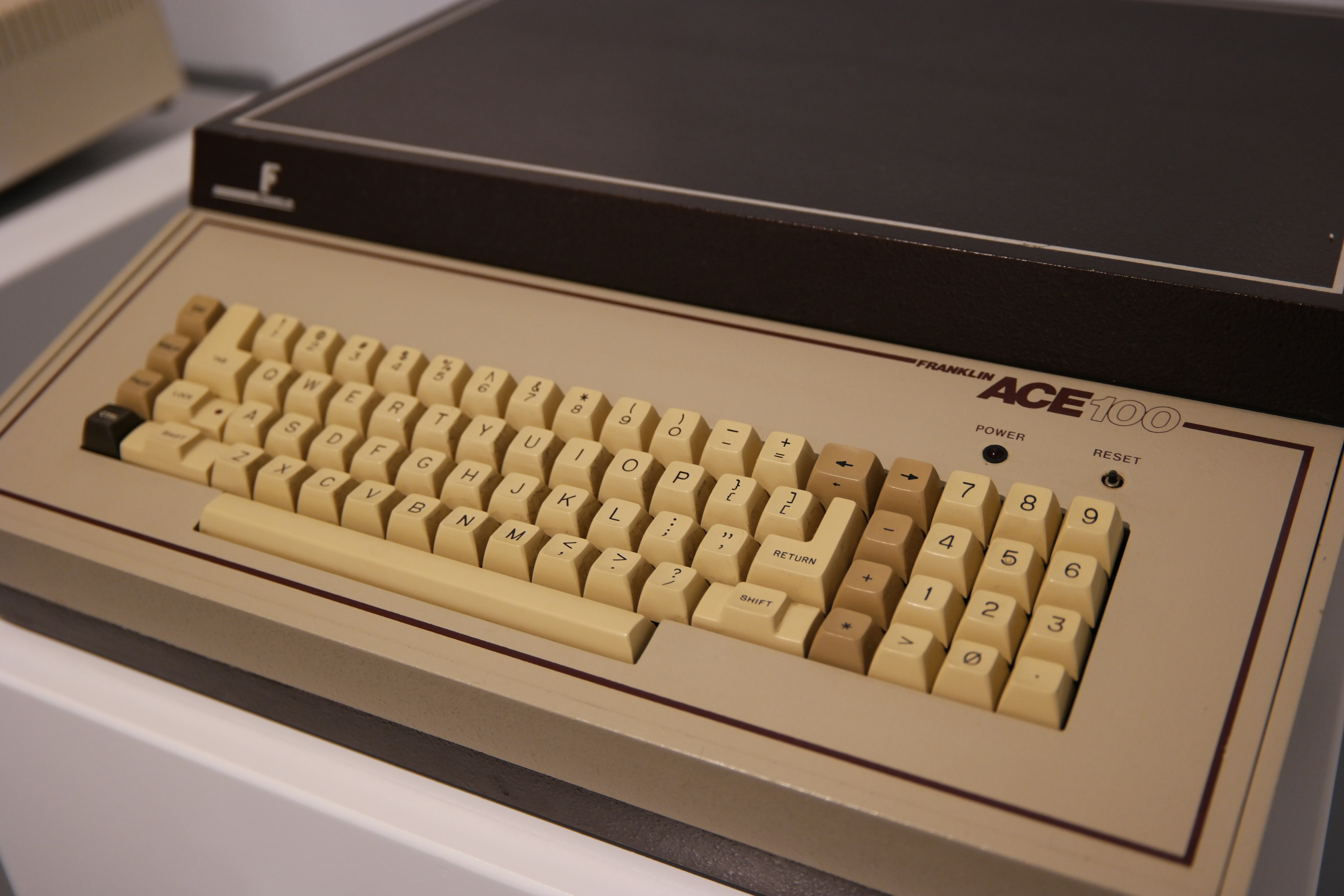
Franklin ACE 100

In early 1982, Franklin released the Franklin ACE 100, and in March of the same year, the Franklin ACE 1000; they were very close copies of the Apple II and Apple II Plus computers, respectively. The motherboard design is nearly identical and Franklin also copied Apple's ROMs. Two months later, Apple Inc. sued Franklin for copyright violation. Franklin initially won, but ultimately lost.

Franklin followed with the ACE 1200, which included two built-in 5¼" floppy drives and an ACE 80 Zilog Z80 processor card (a rebranded PCPI Appli-Card) for CP/M compatibility—a popular third-party option for the Apple II. The ACE 1200 was identical to the ACE 1000, but with the addition of dual built-in floppy drives and four expansion cards pre-installed (one of which offered color video; the ACE 1000 was monochrome). At its peak workforce in 1983, Franklin employed 450 employees.

In August 1983, Franklin faced a legal ruling against its argument that computer code, being primarily in digital form, could not be copyrighted since it did not exist in printed form. Franklin openly acknowledged that it had copied Apple's ROM and operating system code. Despite this admission, Franklin obtained an injunction that allowed it to continue selling its computers. This significant case had long-lasting effects and established important legal precedents regarding copyright and reverse engineering. Even more than 30 years after the ruling in August 1983, the case continued to be frequently cited in legal discussions.

In June 1984, Franklin filed for reorganization under Chapter 11 of the Federal Bankruptcy Act. Franklin reduced its workforce to just over 100, from a previous total of 275 employees. Franklin had been planning to release the Franklin CX, a portable Apple II clone, but this release was canceled due to the bankruptcy.

Starting in October 1985, Franklin released a second-generation line of Apple II clones, consisting of the ACE 2000 series (based on the Apple IIe) and ACE 500 (based on the Apple IIc). These included more memory, as well as offering many features unique to the Apple IIe and Apple IIc, all while undercutting Apple's price. The ACE 2200 sported a detached keyboard and dual internal 5.25-inch floppy disk drives.

Franklin also released a pair of IBM PC compatible computers, the Franklin PC6000 and PC8000, during 1986–1988. Both were based on the Intel 8088 running at 4.77 MHz. The PC6000 had 512K of RAM and a single floppy drive, while the PC8000 had 640K and dual drives. These matched the most common configurations of the time.

Soon after the ACE 2200's release, Apple was able to force Franklin out of the desktop computer market entirely, including its IBM-compatible PCs. As a result, the only Apple-compatible computer that remained on the market was VTech's Laser 128.

With the loss of its desktop computer business, Franklin concentrated on its handheld line, which it had introduced in 1986.

In 1987, Franklin released the Spelling Ace, which could provide spelling corrections to 80,000 English words based on technology from Proximity Technology. Franklin also released its Language Master device, which included spelling correction, dictionary definitions and a thesaurus. In 1988, Franklin acquired Proximity Technology. In 1989, Franklin released an electronic version of the Bible in the King James, Revised Standard and New International versions. Johnny Cash was a spokesperson for the company, recording Bible passages for their line of electronic Bibles.

In 1995, Franklin launched its Bookman product line, which came with an installed database and included a slot for plugging in a second electronic book. Prices varied depending on the title. Previously, the Digital Book System (DBS) product was a player only, with two slots for electronic book cards. Franklin collaborated with Bien Logic to create educational titles for the Bookman platform.

Franklin Electronic Publishers outsourced all of its R&D to Hong Kong, with the last day of US R&D operations being March 31, 2009.

== See also ==
- Bilingual dictionary
- Franklin eBookMan
