= Apple Computer, Inc. v. Franklin Computer Corp. =

Court case in the United States

- Court: United States Court of Appeals for the Third Circuit
- Full case name: Apple Computer, Inc. v. Franklin Computer Corp.
- Argued: March 17 1983
- Decided: August 30 1983
- Citations: 714 F.2d 1240 (3d Cir. 1983); 70 A.L.R.Fed. 153, 219 U.S.P.Q. 113, 1983 Copr.L.Dec. P 25,565

Case history
- Prior history: Injunction denied, E.D. Pa. July 30, 1982; motion for reconsideration denied
- Subsequent history: Rehearing denied; rehearing en banc denied, Sept. 23, 1983; petition for certiorari dismissed Jan. 4, 1984, 464 U.S. 1033

Holding
- Computer software could be protected by copyright. District Court reversed and remanded.

Court membership
- Judges sitting: Circuit Judges James Hunter III, A. Leon Higginbotham, Jr., Dolores Sloviter

Case opinions
- Majority: Sloviter, joined by Hunter, Higginbotham

Laws applied
- Copyright Act of 1976

Apple Computer, Inc. v. Franklin Computer Corp., 714 F.2d 1240 (3d Cir. 1983), was the first time an appellate level court in the United States held that a computer's BIOS could be protected by copyright. As second impact, this ruling clarified that binary code, the machine-readable form of software and firmware, was copyrightable too and not only the human-readable source code form of software.

Franklin Computer Corporation introduced the Franklin Ace 1000, a clone of Apple Computer's Apple II, in 1982. Apple quickly determined that substantial portions of the Franklin ROM and operating system had been copied directly from Apple's versions, and on May 12, 1982, filed suit in the United States District Court for the Eastern District of Pennsylvania. It cited the presence of some of the same embedded strings, such as the name "James Huston" (an Apple programmer), and "Applesoft," on both the Apple and Franklin system disks.

Franklin was the only Apple clone maker with substantial sales, with an estimated 50,000 units in 1983 compared to the Apple IIe's 650,000. Franklin admitted that it had copied Apple's software but argued that it would have been impractical to independently write its own versions of the software and maintain compatibility, although it said it had written its own version of Apple's copy utility and was working on its own versions of other software. Franklin argued that because Apple's software existed only in machine-readable form, and not in printed form, and because some of the software did not contain copyright notices, it could be freely copied. The Apple II firmware was likened to a machine part whose form was dictated entirely by the requirements of compatibility (that is, an exact copy of Apple's ROM was the only part that would "fit" in an Apple-compatible computer and enable its intended function), and was therefore not copyrightable.

The district court found in favor of Franklin. However, Apple appealed the ruling to the United States Court of Appeals for the Third Circuit which, in a separate case decided three days after Franklin won at the lower level, had determined that both a program existing only in a written form unreadable to humans (e.g. object code) and one embedded on a ROM were protected by copyright (see Williams Elec., Inc., v. Artic Int'l, Inc., 685 F.2d 870 (1982)). The Court of Appeals overturned the district court's ruling in Franklin by applying its holdings in Williams and going further to hold that operating systems were also copyrightable. The Court remanded the case to the District Court for a determination regarding whether Apple's operating system was one of a very limited number of ways to achieve its function. If it was, then Franklin would not be liable for copyright infringement. The parties settled.

Apple was able to force Franklin to withdraw its clones by 1988. The company later brought non-infringing clones to market, but as these models were only partially compatible with the Apple II, and as the Apple II architecture was by this time outdated in any case, they enjoyed little success in the marketplace.

IBM believed that IBM PC clone makers such as Eagle Computer and Corona Data Systems similarly infringed on its copyright, and after Apple v. Franklin successfully forced them to stop using the BIOS. The Phoenix BIOS in 1984, however, and similar products such as AMI BIOS, which were clean-room engineered and did not contain any of IBM's code, permitted computer makers to legally build essentially 100% PC-compatible clones without having to reverse engineer the PC BIOS themselves.

Another impact of the decision was the rise of the shrink-wrap proprietary software commercial business model, where before a source code-driven software distribution schema dominated.

== See also ==
- Litigation involving Apple Inc.
