= Gigatronics =

Gigatronics (1980-1992) was a Greek computer manufacturer. It produced the model "ΕΡΜΗΣ" (1984) based on the microprocessor 6502, and the personal computer "KAT" (1988) based on the microprocessors 8088 and 65C816. "ΕΡΜΗΣ" had its own operating system, database and the programming language "SUPER BASIC", while "KAT" was running in both IBM and Apple modes.

In 1986, it developed the database, spreadsheet and word processing program "Foundation" that was also distributed in the US for Apple personal computers.
