= Pravetz (computer) =

Range of Bulgarian personal computers

- Native name: Правец
- Type: Public
- Industry: Computer hardware Electronics
- Founded: 1979; 47 years ago
- Founder: Engineer Ivan Vasilev Marangozov
- Headquarters: Pravets, Bulgaria, near Sofia, Bulgaria
- Area served: Bulgaria
- Products: Desktops, servers, notebooks, netbooks

Pravetz (Bulgarian: Правец) is a brand of personal computers produced in Bulgaria from 1979. They were widely used in scientific organizations and schools until the 1990s.

Pravets were the first personal computers made in Bulgaria. Before that, various types of large computer systems were used, the size of rooms (60-70), as well as even vacuum tube computers before that. The name of the Pravets computers comes from the city where they were manufactured, called Pravetz, ("Правец" in Bulgarian) with some components and software being produced in other towns such as Sofia, Plovdiv, Stara Zagora and other Bulgarian cities.

Pravetz computers are still in use in some schools such as NPH of CTS (National Professional High school of Computer Technological Systems "НПГ по КТС" ), locally also known as UKTC. and TSES (Technological School "Electric Systems", ТУЕС)[, similar to college for beginner students in computing, because they are adapted in manufacturing for educational purposes.

Bulgaria was the leading manufacturer, with its leading trademark Pravetz, of computer and peripherals electronics for the socialist economic union COMECON in 20th century, with about 40% of the total of exports within the communist bloc.

== History ==
An early Bulgarian-made personal computer was IMKO-1 (its name resembles Bulgarian name ELKA (short name for ELektronen KAlkulator, Cyrillic ЕЛКА ЕЛектронен КАлкулатор) or calculator, yet the name of the first state-manufactured personal computers points to its production as a PC or Pravetz Computers (правя, pravja - make, manufacture)). The prototype of the Pravetz computers that were developed by engineer Ivan Vassilev Marangozov, who was rightfully accused of cloning the Apple II. In fact, IMKO-1 was a nearly identical clone of the original Apple II with a few minor exceptions - case, keyboard, character table (the lowercase Latin alphabet was replaced with Cyrillic uppercase) and power supply (early models used bulky and heavy linear power supplies). A few early models were produced at the ITKR (pronounced ee-teh-kah-reh, Institute of Technical Cybernetics and Robotics), a section of the Bulgarian Academy of Sciences. Industrial production in Pravetz started shortly after.

The line of Bulgarian personal computers at the time of release was prohibitively expensive for individuals and in addition were only sold to different government institutions - educational sector, military and administrative sector.

Pravetz computers were of major importance in the economy of the Comecon.

== Model line ==
=== 8-bit architecture ===
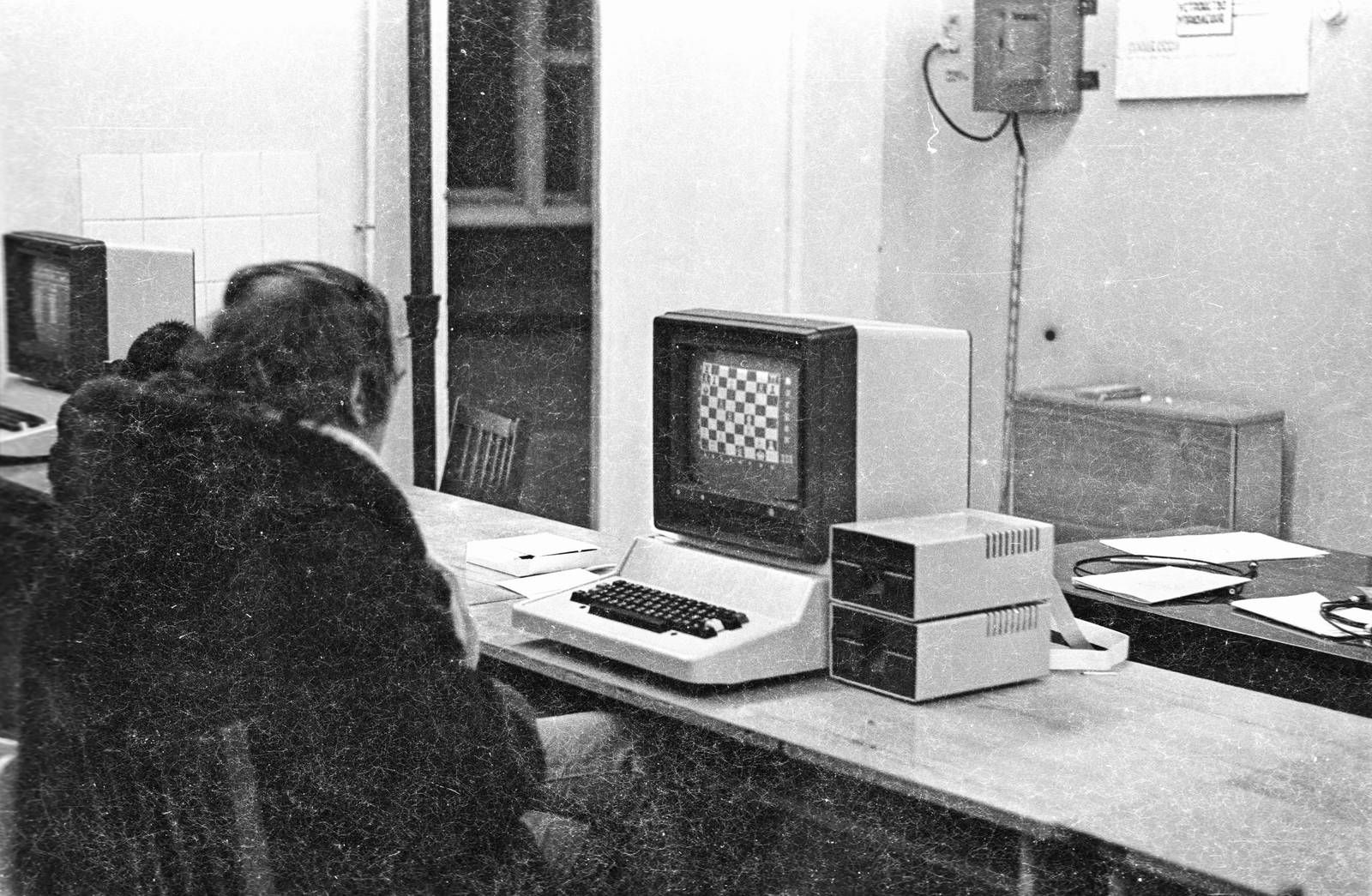
Pravetz 82 computer in school class in Russia

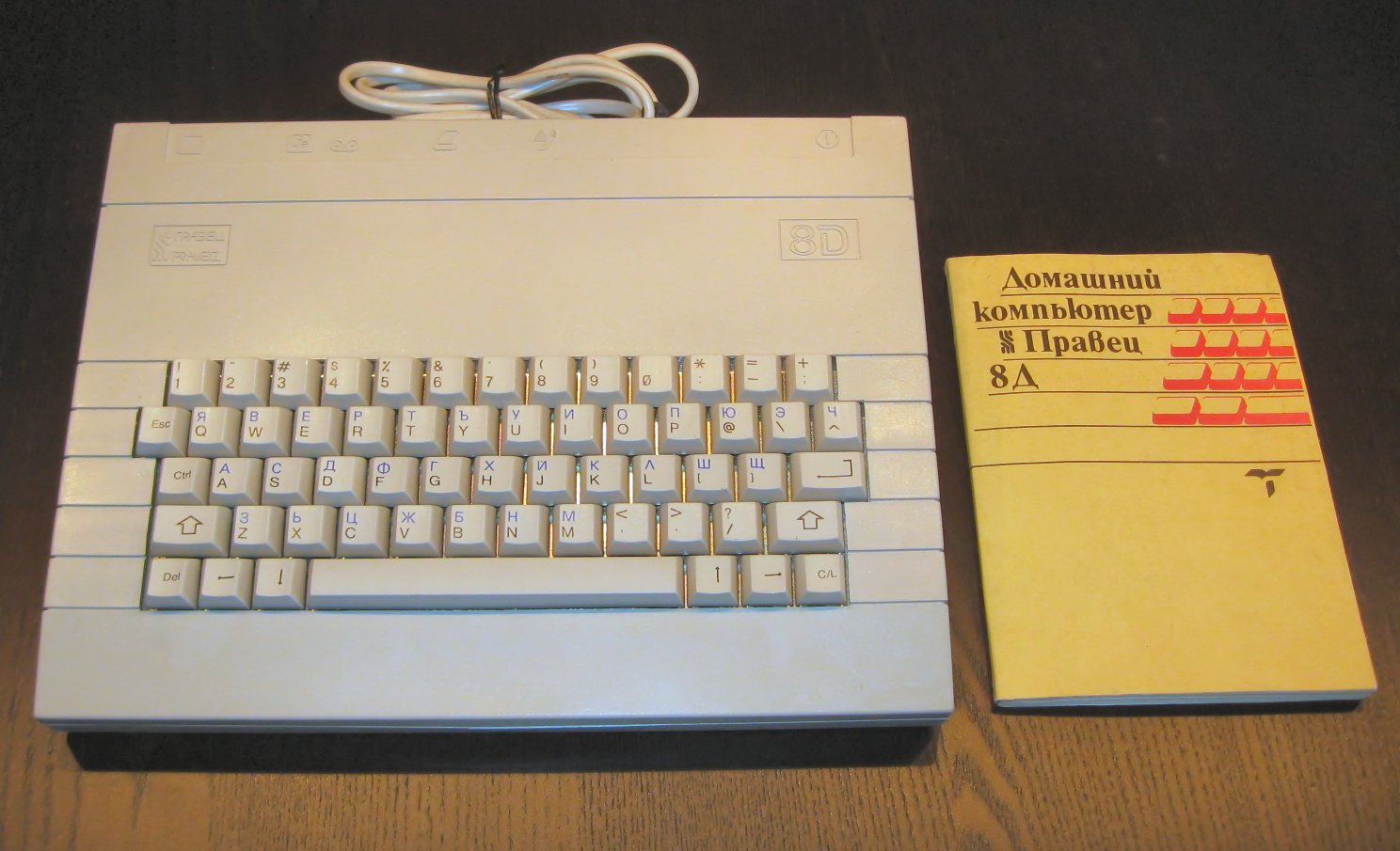
Pravetz 8D

Except for the Oric-derived Pravetz 8D (and possibly the IMKO-1), all the Pravetz 8-bit systems are largely compatible with the popular Apple II and its successors, with the exception that they offer Cyrillic fonts and some other improvements compared to Apple.

==== IMKO scientific computers ====
Much before Pravetz entered serial manufacturing, the IMKO-1 prototype development within the Institute of Technical Cybernetics and Robotics (ITKR) (ИТКР), a section of the Bulgarian Academy of Sciences 1979. According to some computer users, IMKO was the very first Bulgarian personal computer, its name resembles the ELKA name for the contemporary Bulgarian electronic calculator. It used a clone of the MOS Technology 6502 CPU running at 1 MHz and 16/4 KB of RAM/ROM. The storage media is a cassette recorder. It had a metal case and very large and heavy linear power supply. The ROM was an exact copy of the Apple II ROM (the only change was the name).

The next prototype IMKO-2 was developed as a clone of Apple II Plus, although the keyboard design stayed close to the original Apple II model, rather than the Plus keyboard. In 1982 experimental small series assembly of IMKO-2 units was organised by the ITKR in their production base in Iskar, Sofia. Initially, only about 50 units were manufactured for testing the feasibility for mass production. In became the basis of the industrial scale production of the Pravetz series 8.

==== Pravetz series 8 ====
- Pravetz 82 - is one of the first Pravetz Computers, PC, that were named so to be clear to be the Personal Computers, PC in Bulgaria, 82 is the model year. BASIC interpreter, RAM/ROM - 48/12 KB; CPU Synertek 6502 /1 MHz. The storage is improved due to the availability of (optional) 5.25" floppy disk drive(s). They had yellow plastic case and black keyboards. The later revisions used switching power supplies. ROM and schematics were not changed and were identical to those of the Apple II. A lot of the chips used were Bulgarian and Soviet made clones. Pravetz 82 was relatively reliable - most of the hardware problems were due to the widespread use of substandard quality IC sockets, mainly used for the DRAM chips.
- Pravetz 8М - Integrated second CPU Zilog Z80A at 4 MHz to be able to run CP/M and its software. The military version features integrated terminal design. It was essentially a version of Apple II+ with the optional CP/M card integrated on the motherboard. It had 64 KB of RAM on-board, a switching power supply and an off-white plastic case with an improved design.
- Pravetz 8E - Industrial model based on the original Pravetz 82 architecture plus some memory extensions
- Pravetz 8А - Uses Bulgarian-made chipset СМ 630, memory could be expanded up to 1 MB using optional memory card, accessible in 64 KB banks. It was a nearly identical clone of Apple //e on electrical diagrams and ROM content levels. The case was similar to the one used for the 8M model. The keyboard was improved with arrow keys, and the Char table included Cyrillic upper and lowercase symbols. This was the most advanced model with the greatest level of upgradeability.
- Pravetz 8С - "streamlined version" of the 8А model. 128 KB RAM integrated, but not expandable. Fewer slots, but all essential controllers were integrated on the motherboard - Parallel (Centronics) interface, FDD controllers, joystick and sometimes with RS-232. A version of 8C is the Pravetz 8VC, which features a terminal-like design.
- Pravetz 8D - 8 bit home computer, based on 6502 and VIA 6522. It used a TV set instead of a computer monitor. Not compatible with Pravetz 82 but inherits its architecture from the English Oric Atmos home computers and compatible with their software.

=== 16-bit architecture ===
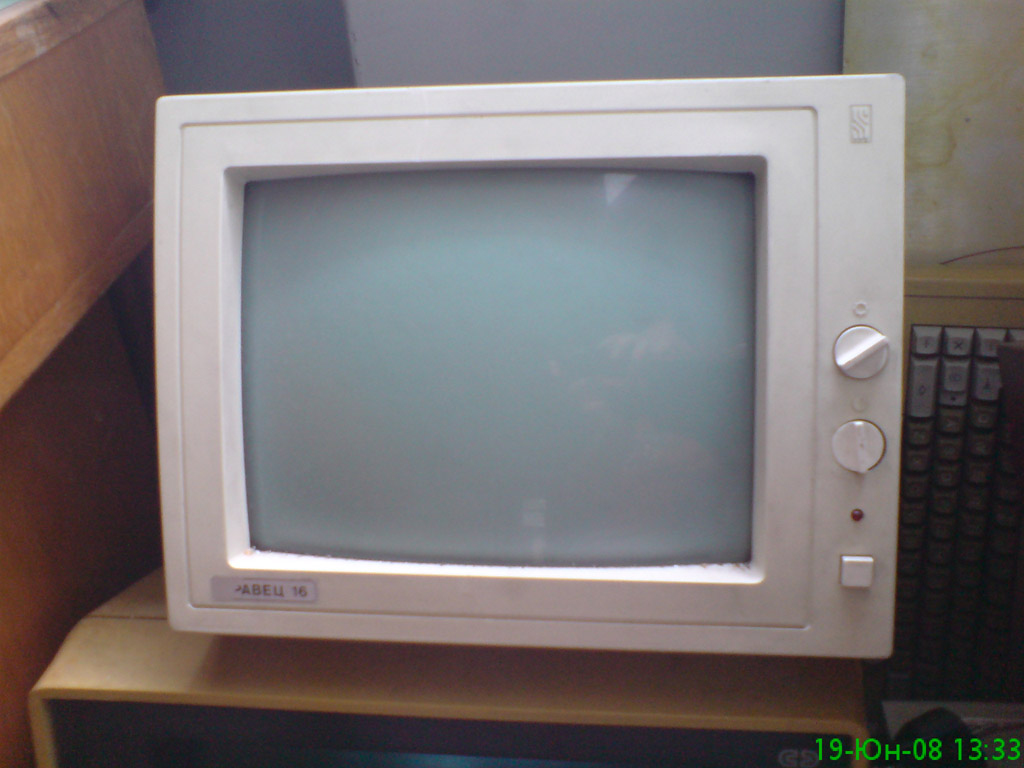
Display of Pravetz 16

Pravetz-16 were IBM PC compatible:

- Pravetz-16 (IMKO-4) - Featured Intel 8088 at 4.77 MHz. Simple motherboard design with Bulgarian chipset. Standard RAM 256 KB or 512 KB expandable to 640 KB.
- Pravetz-16E
- Pravetz-16ES (variations as a desktop or tower box) - Featured the 80186 processor at 8 MHz.
- Pravetz-16A
- Pravetz-16T - Turbo version
- Pravetz-286

=== 32-bit architecture ===
- Pravetz-386
- Pravetz-486

=== 64-bit architecture (Revival in 2014) ===
The brand was revived in 2014 by Pravetz Computers OOD, a private company that specializes in x86-64 based laptops.

== See also ==
- History of computer hardware in Bulgaria
