= Pravets =

Pravets Правец
- Town
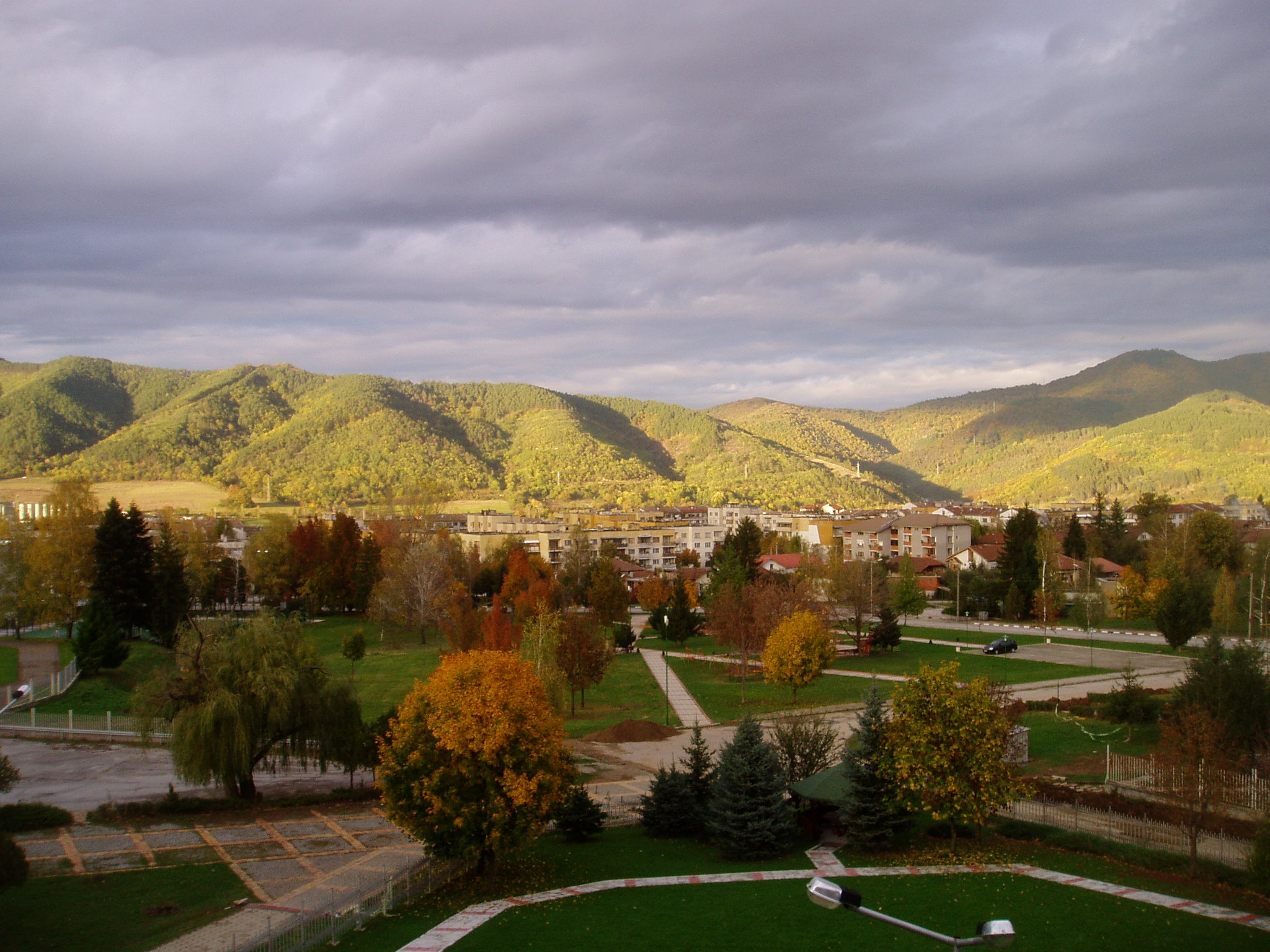
- Pravets in autumn

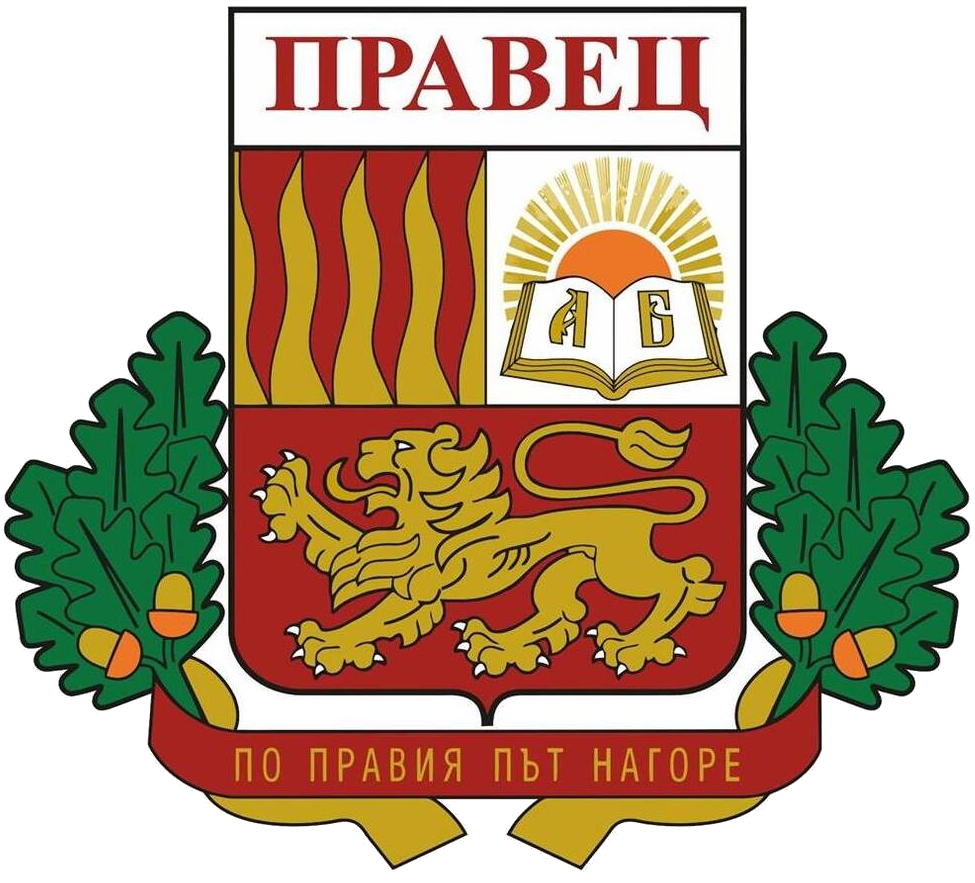
- Coat of arms

- Location of Pravets within Bulgaria
- Coordinates: 42°53′40″N 23°54′56″E
- Country: Bulgaria
- Province: Sofia Province

Government
  - Mayor: Rumen Guninski (BSP)

Area
  - Total: 46.073 km^{2} (17.789 sq mi)
- Elevation: 440 m (1,440 ft)

Population (15 June 2020)
  - Total: 4,363
  - Density: 94.70/km^{2} (245.3/sq mi)
- Time zone: UTC+2 (EET)
  - Summer (DST): UTC+3 (EEST)
- Postal Code: 2161
- Area code: 07133
- Website: www.pravets.bg

Pravets or Pravetz (Bulgarian: Правец, also transliterated as Pravec, pronounced [ˈpravɛt͡s]) is a town in Pravets Municipality of Sofia Province in central western Bulgaria, located approximately 60 kilometres (37 mi) from the capital Sofia. Pravets is home town of Pravetz computers.

Pravets has a population of 4,512 people. Mountains surround it, which allows for a mild climate with rare winds. In the outskirts there is an artificial lake used for fishing and recreation. The town is the birthplace of Bulgaria's longtime communist president Todor Zhivkov. The first microprocessor factory in Bulgaria was established in Pravets. The computers produced there, which were among the first in Bulgaria, were named Pravetz after the town.

Today, the town is most famous for its computers and technology systems high school and the Hyatt Pravets golf resort complex. There is also a language high school by the name of Aleko Konstantinov. It prepares many students who continue their undergraduate education in Bulgaria, England, the US, Germany, and France. The Professional Computing and Technology Systems high school is one of two technical schools in Bulgaria, which prepares students for the Technical University in Sofia, Bulgaria, and allows for direct admission to the university to its top students.

== Gallery ==
The coat of arms of Pravets on a billboard

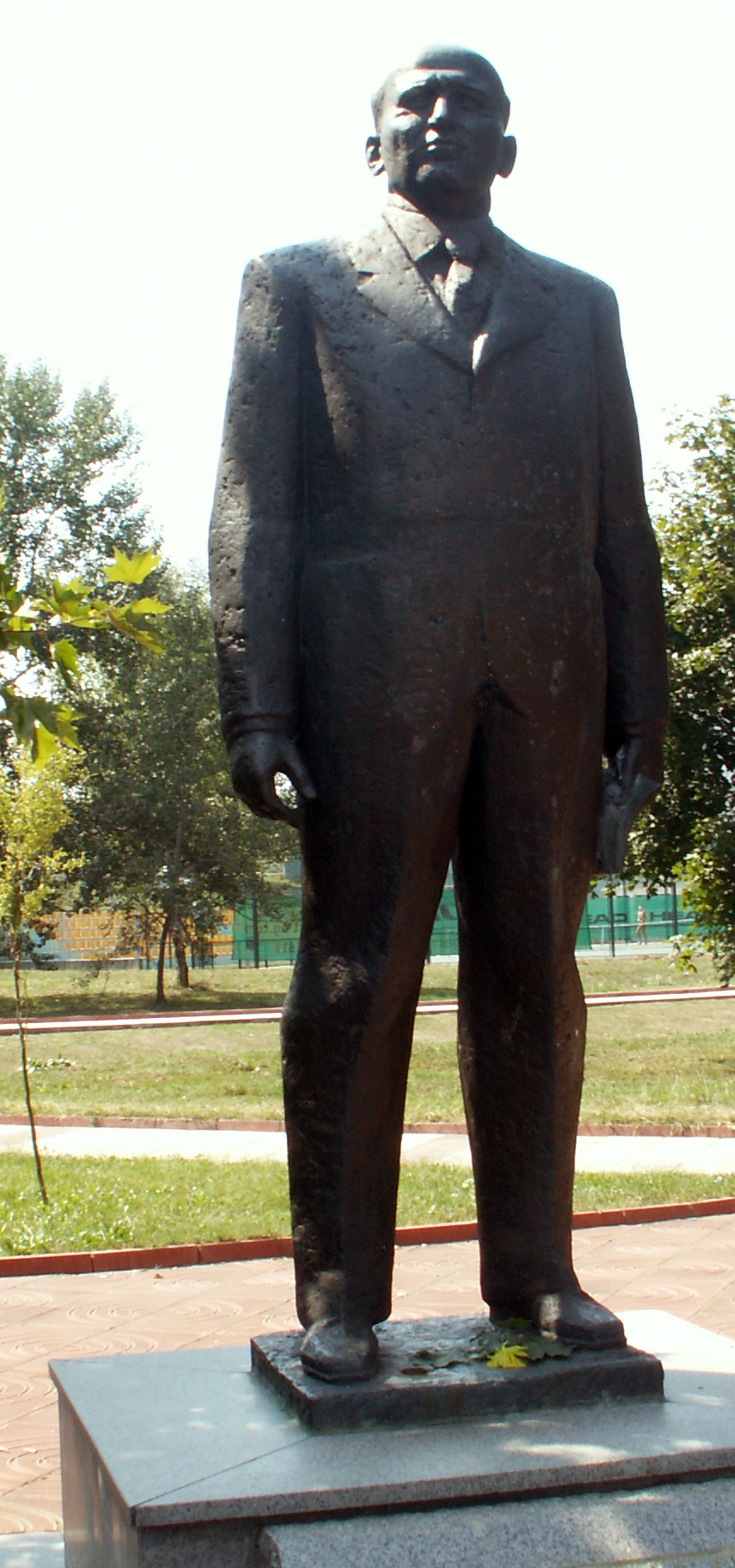
Todor Zhivkov memorial in Pravets

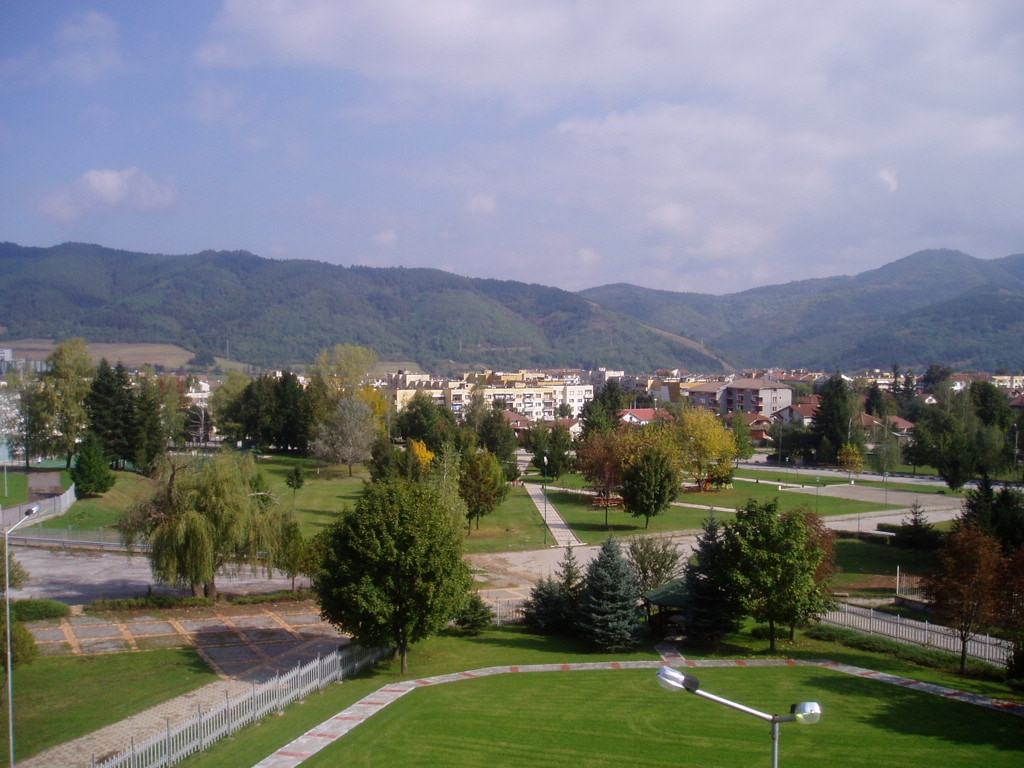
Pravets in summer

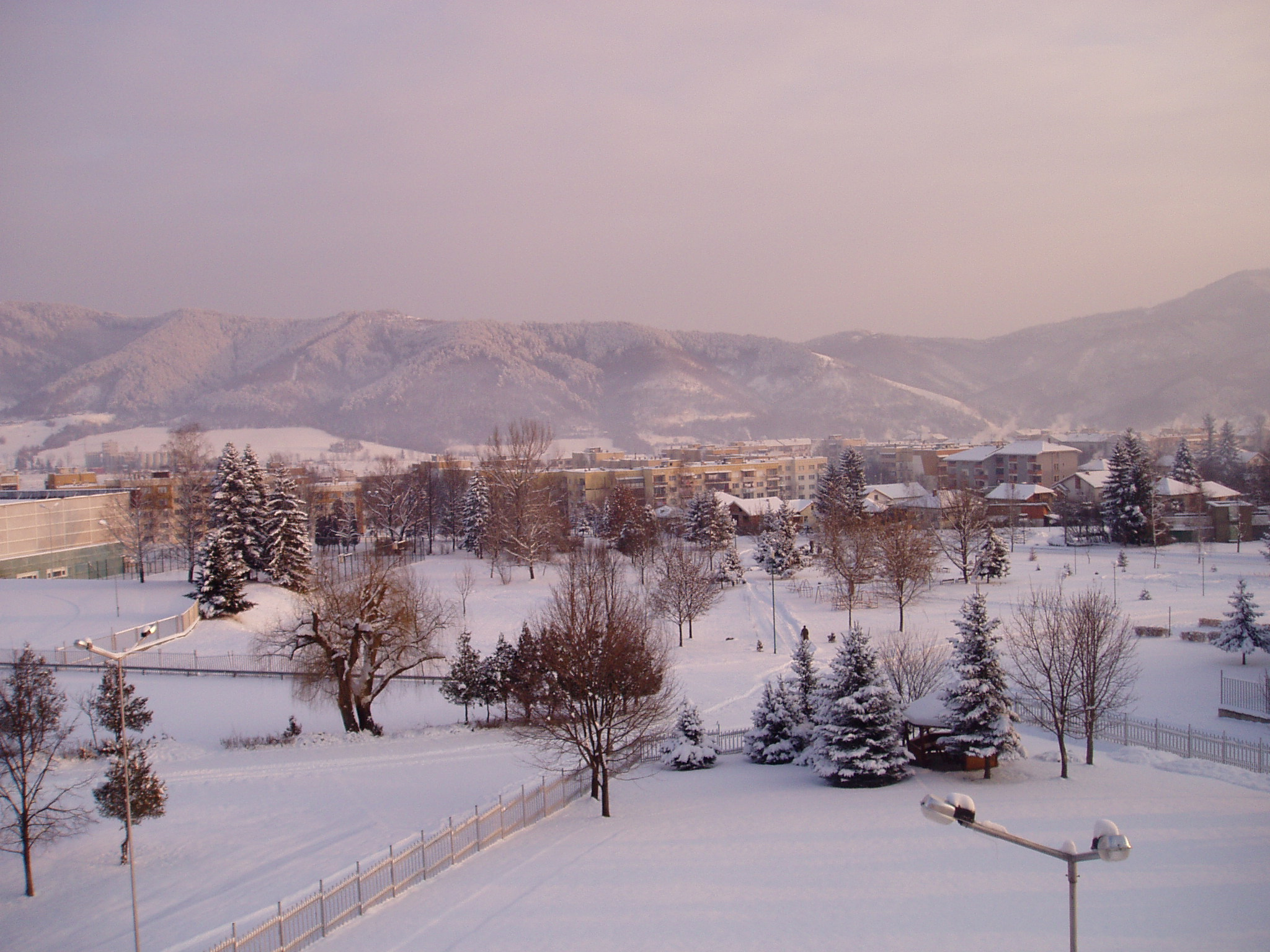
Pravets in winter

Pravets in spring

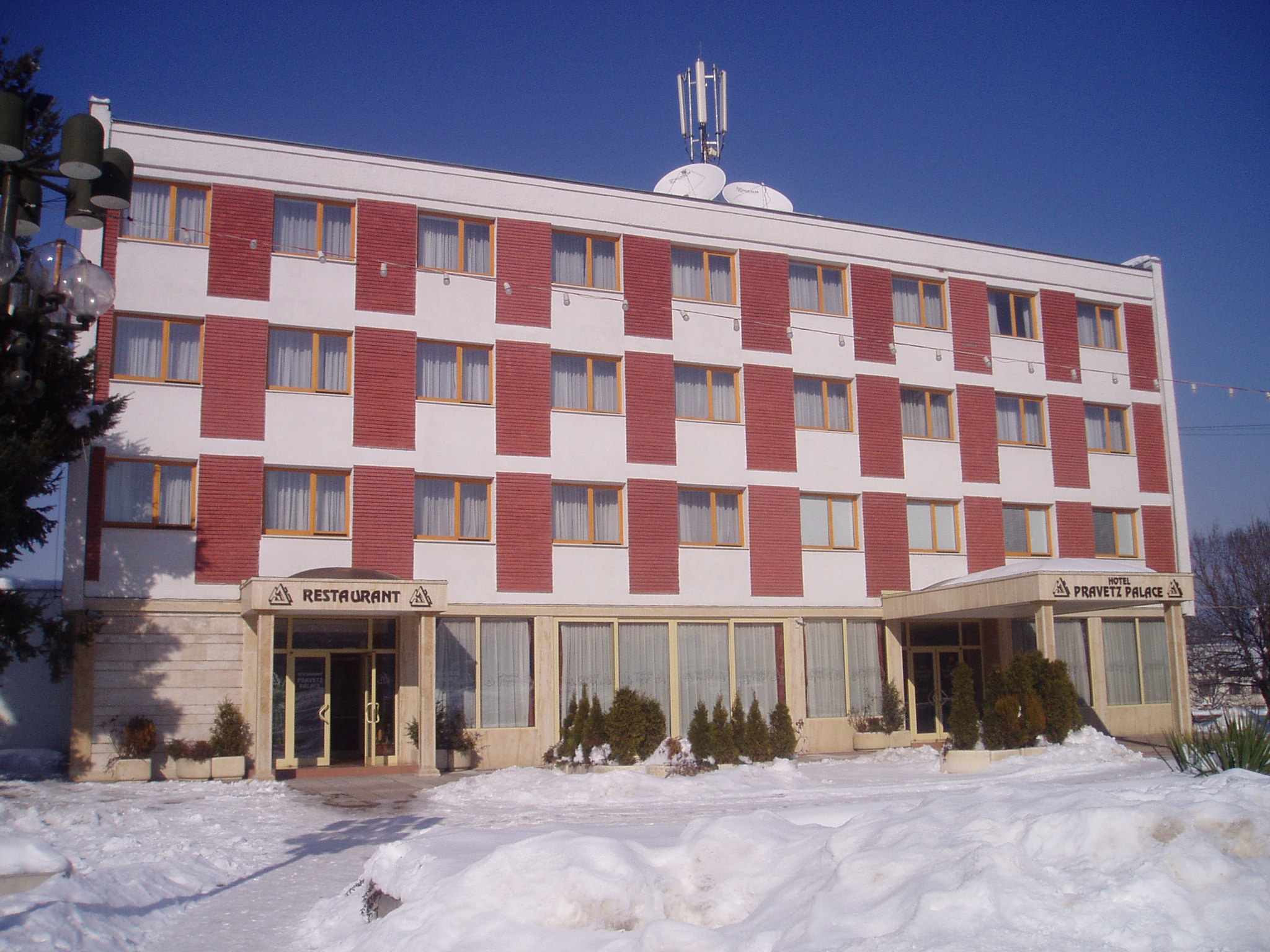
The Palace Hotel

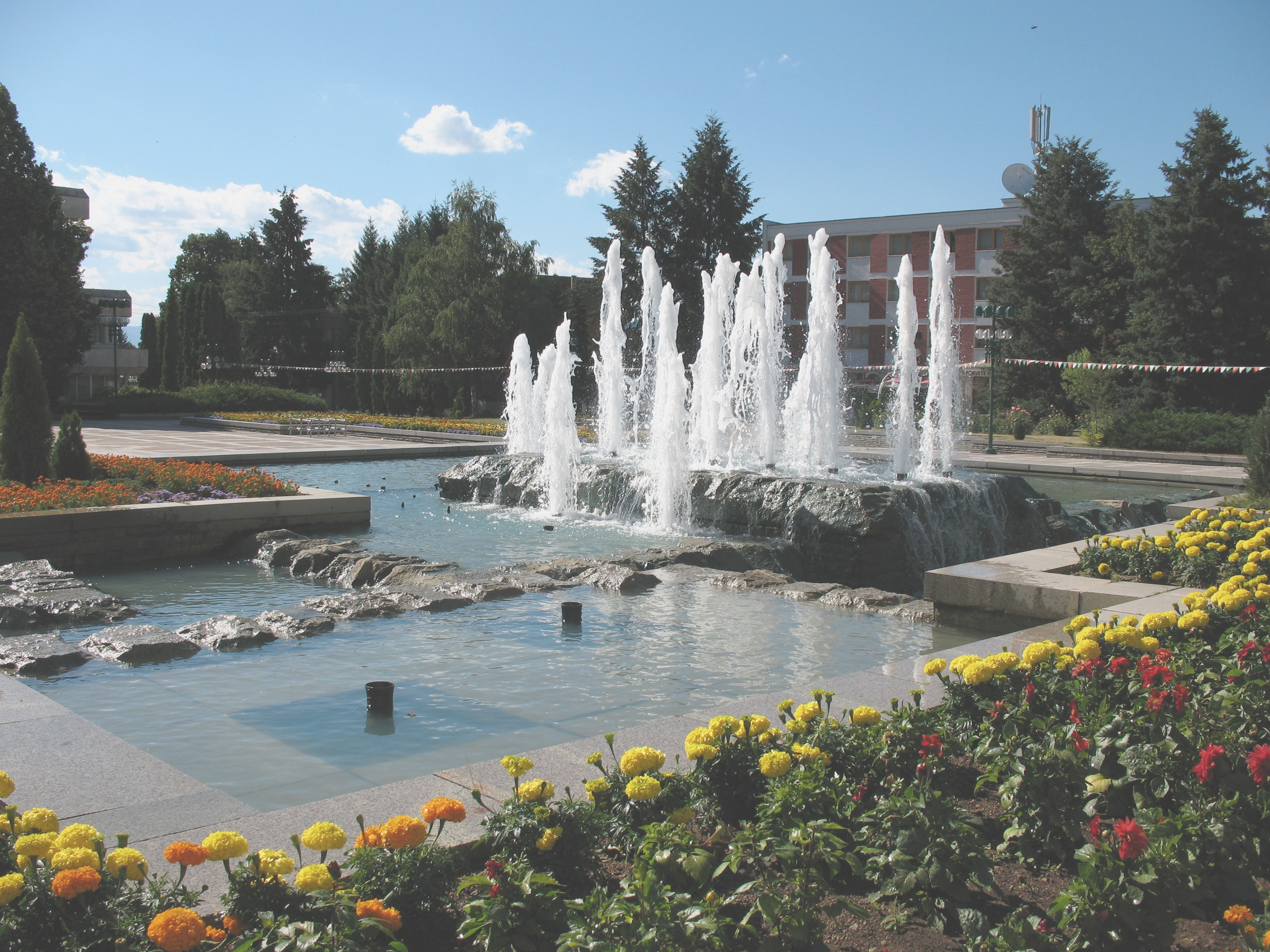
Square

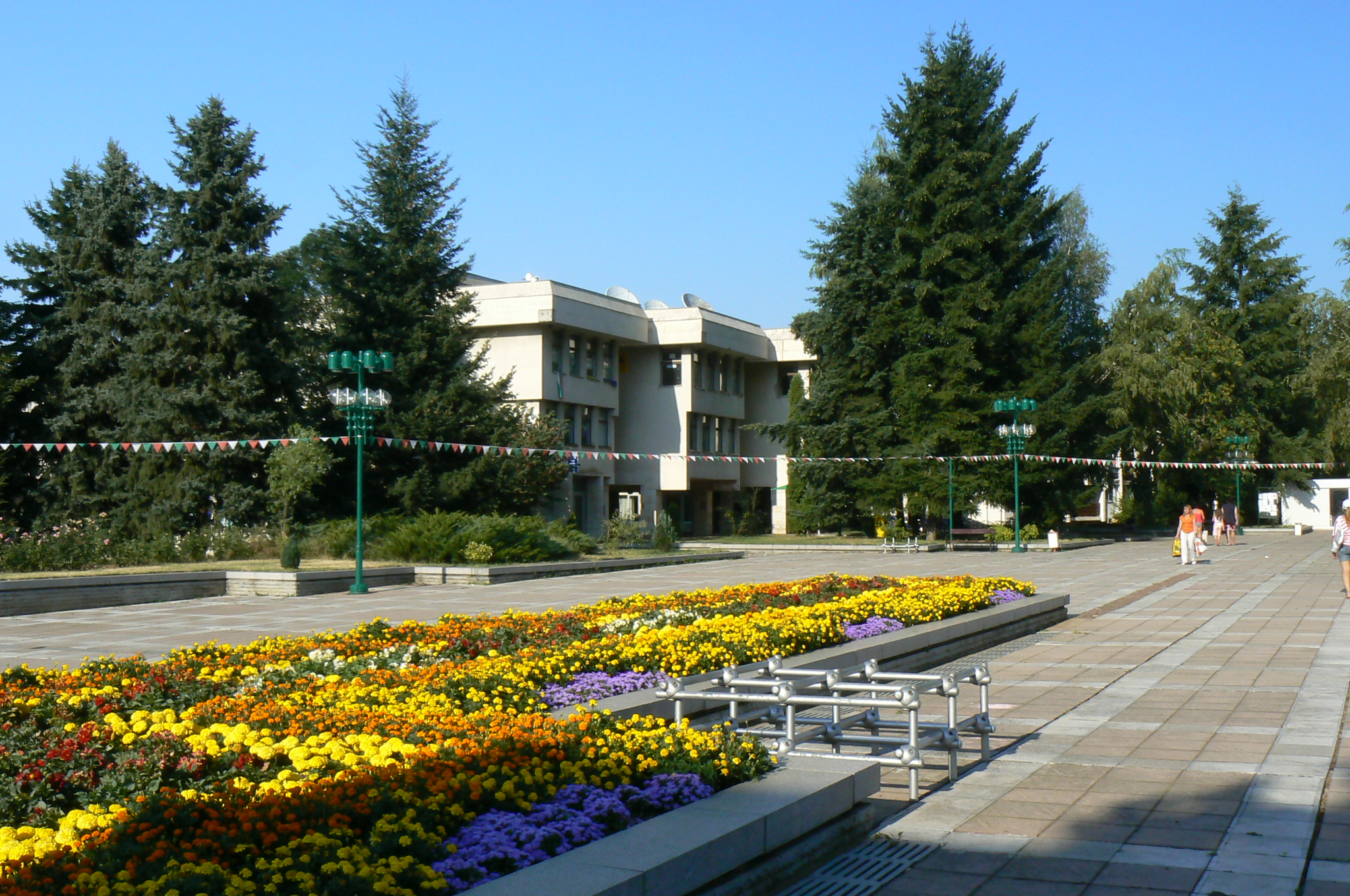
Square
