= List of computer system manufacturers =

This is a list of notable computer system manufacturers. A computer system is a nominally complete computer that includes the hardware, operating system (main software), and the means to use peripheral equipment needed and used for full or mostly full operation. Such systems may constitute personal computers (including desktop computers, portable computers, laptops, all-in-ones, and more), mainframe computers, minicomputers, servers, and workstations, among other classes of computing. The following is a list of notable manufacturers and sellers of computer systems, both present and past. There are currently 432 companies in this incomplete list.

== Current ==
Name	Parent company	Country of origin	Year of market entry	Note(s)/ ref(s).
Acemagic	—	China	2013	
Acer Inc.	—	Taiwan	1976	
ACube Systems Srl	—	Italy	2007	
Advanced Battlestations	Newegg	United States	2000	
AG Neovo	—	Taiwan	1978	
Aigo	—	China	1993	
Alienware	Dell (since 2006)	United States	1996	
AOpen	Acer Inc.	Taiwan	1996	
Aorus	Gigabyte Technology	Taiwan	2016	
Apple Inc.	—	United States	1976	
ASRock	Pegatron (since 2010)	Taiwan	2002	
Asus	—	Taiwan	1989	
BenQ	Qisda Corporation	Taiwan	1984	
Biostar	—	Taiwan	1986	
Brother Industries	—	Japan		
Chassis Plans	—	United States	1997	
Chip PC Technologies	—	Israel	2000	
Cisco Systems	—	United States	1984	
ClearCube	—	United States	1997	
Clevo	—	Taiwan	1983	
Clover Network	Fiserv	United States	2010	
Compal Electronics	—	Taiwan	1984	
Cray	Hewlett Packard Enterprise (since 2019)	United States	1972	
CyberPowerPC	—	United States	1998	
Dell	—	United States	1984	
DFI	—	Taiwan	1981	
Digital Storm	—	United States	2002	
Dynabook Inc.	Sharp Corporation (since 2020)	Japan	1954	
Elitegroup Computer Systems	—	Taiwan	1987	
Epson	—	Japan	1982	(Note: Formerly a subsidiary of Seiko; now independent)
Eurocom Corporation	—	Canada	1989	
EVGA Corporation	—	United States	1999	
Falcon Northwest	—	United States	1992	
First International Computer	—	Taiwan	1979	
Founder Technology	—	China	1986	
Foxconn	—	Taiwan	1974	
Framework Computer	—	United States	2021	
Fujitsu	—	Japan	1954	
Fujitsu Technology Solutions	Fujitsu	Japan	1999	
Gigabyte Technology	—	Taiwan	1986	
Google	Alphabet Inc. (since 2016)	United States	2011	
Gradiente	IGB Eletrônica	Brazil	1964	
Groupe Bull	Atos	France	1952	
Grundig	Arçelik	Germany		
Hasee	—	China	1995	
HCLTech	—	India	1975	
Hewlett Packard Enterprise	—	United States	2015	
Hisense	—	China	1994	
Hitachi	—	Japan	1958	(Note: Exited the computer business in 2007, but still active in servers)
HP Inc.	—	United States	2015	
Huawei	—	China	1987	
Hyundai Technology	Hyundai Group	South Korea	1986	
IBM	—	United States	1950	
IGEL Technology	—	Germany	2001	
Intel	—	United States	1968	
Inventec	—	Taiwan	1975	
Itautec	Itaúsa	Brazil	1979	
Kontron	—	Germany	1959	
Lanix	—	Mexico	1990	
Lanner Electronics	—	Taiwan	1986	
Lenovo	—	China	1984	
LG Corporation	—	South Korea	1983	
Lite-On	—	Taiwan	1975	
Maingear	—	United States	2002	
MCST	—	Russia	1992	
Medion	Lenovo (since 2011)	Germany	1983	
Mesh Computers	—	United Kingdom	1987	
Micro Center	Micro Electronics, Inc.	United States	1979	
Microsoft	—	United States	2012	
Micro-Star International	—	Taiwan	1986	
MiTAC	—	Taiwan	1982	
Motorola Mobility	Lenovo (since 2014)	United States	2011	
Mouse Computer	—	Japan	1998	
NComputing	—	United States	2003	
NCR Corporation	—	United States	1953	
NEC	—	Japan	1954	
Nvidia	—	United States	1993	
NZXT	—	United States	2004	
Olidata	Acer Inc. (since 2009)	Italy	1982	
Oracle Corporation	—	United States	1977	
Origin PC	Corsair Gaming (since 2019)	United States	2009	
Panasonic	—	Japan	1958	
Pine64	—	Hong Kong	2015	
Positivo Tecnologia	Grupo Positivo	Brazil	1989	
Puget Systems	—	United States	2000	
Quanta Computer	—	Taiwan	1988	
Raspberry Pi Holdings	—	United Kingdom	2012	
Razer Inc.	—	Singapore	1998	
RCA	American Future Technology Corporation	United States		
Research Machines	—	United Kingdom	1977	
Samsung Electronics	—	South Korea	1982	
Sapphire Technology	—	Hong Kong	2001	
Shuttle Inc.	—	Taiwan	1983	
Síragon	—	Venezuela	2004	
Sord Computer Corporation	—	Japan	1970	
Stratus Technologies	—	United States	1980	
Supermicro	—	United States	1993	
System76	—	United States	2005	
TabletKiosk	—	United States	2003	
Tatung Company	—	Taiwan	1984	
Tuxedo Computers	—	Germany	2004	
Tyan	MiTAC (since 2007)	Taiwan	1989	
Unisys	—	United States	1986	
Vaio	—	Japan	1996	(Note: Formerly a brand of Sony; in 2014, Vaio Corporation Inc., a joint venture majority-owned by Japan Industrial Partners and minority-owned by Sony, was formed to buy out the Vaio trademark)
Valve Corporation	—	United States	2015	
Velocity Micro	—	United States	1997	
VIA Technologies	—	Taiwan	1987	
Viglen	—	United Kingdom	1975	
Vizio	—	United States	2002	
Walton Group	—	Bangladesh	1977	
Wistron	—	Taiwan	2001	
Wortmann	—	Germany	1986	
Xiaomi	—	China	2010	
Zoostorm	VIP Group	United States	1993	
ZOTAC	—	Hong Kong	2006	
zSpace	—	United States	2007	

== Inactive ==
Name	Parent company	Country of origin	Year of market entry	Year of market exit	Fate	Note(s)/ ref(s).
3R Computers	Orange Nassau Electronics (1985–1992)	United States	1981	1992	Acquired by Digital Communications Associates	
Acorn Computers	—	United Kingdom	1978	1998	Acquired by Morgan Stanley and reorganized as Element 14	
Action Computer Enterprise	—	United States	1978	1990	Dissolution	
Adage, Inc.	—	United States	1957	1994	Acquired by Systems & Computer Technology Corporation	
Advanced Digital Corporation	—	United States	1980	1990	Bankruptcy	
Advanced Logic Research	—	United States	1984	1997	Acquired by Gateway, Inc.	
ACFA, Inc.	—	United States	1977	1980	Dissolution	
Airis Computer	—	United States	1989	1993	Dissolution	
Alaris, Inc.	—	United States	1991	1996	Left the computer business	
Alliant Computer Systems	—	United States	1982	1992	Bankruptcy	
Alpha Microsystems	—	United States	1977	2018	Dissolution	
Altos Computer Systems	—	United States	1977	1990	Acquired by Acer Inc.	
AM Jacquard Systems	—	United States	Unknown	Unknown	Unknown	
Ambra Computer Corporation	IBM	United States	1992	1996	Dissolution	
Amdahl Corporation	—	United States	1970	1997	Acquired by Fujitsu	
Amdek	Wyse	United States	1987	1988	Left the computer business; continued to make monitors until the late 1990s	
Ampro	—	United States	1983	2008	Acquired by ADLINK	
American Computer and Peripheral	—	United States	1985	1990	Bankruptcy	
American Micro Technology	—	United States	1985	1988	Dissolution	
Ampere, Inc.	—	Japan	1984	Unknown	Unknown	
Amstrad	—	United Kingdom	1984	2007	Acquired by BSkyB	
AnyBus Technologies	CMS Enhancements	United States	1992	1994	Dissolution	
Apollo Computer	—	United States	1980	1989	Acquired by Hewlett-Packard	
Apparat, Inc.	—	United States	1978	1988	Dissolution	
Apricot Computers	—	United Kingdom	1965	1999	Dissolution	
Ardent Computer	—	United States	1985	1989	Merged with Stellar Computer to form Stardent Inc.	
AST Research	Samsung Electronics (1997–1999)	United States	1980	1999	Acquired by Samsung Electronics in 1997; division dissolved in 1999	
Atari Corporation	JT Storage (1996–1998)	United States	1984	1996	Acquired by JT Storage; JT in turn sold to Hasbro in 1998	
Athena Computer & Electronic Systems	—	United States	1982	1987	Dissolution	
The Authorship Resource	—	United States	1977	Unknown	Dissolution	
AT&T Computer Systems	AT&T Corporation	United States	1984	1989	Merged back into AT&T Corporation; previously reorganized as AT&T Information Systems	
Averatec	TriGem	United States	2003	2012	Dissolution	
Barrington International	—	United States	1980	1986	Dissolution	
Be Inc.	—	United States	1990	2001	Acquired by Palm, Inc.	
Bell & Howell	—	United States	1979	1982	Exited the computer business	
Bendix Corporation	—	United States	1956	1963	Sold computer division to Control Data Corporation	
BiiN	—	United States	1982	1990	Liquidation	
Billings Computer	—	United States	1977	Unknown	Unknown	
Blue Chip Electronics	—	United States	1981	1989	Acquired by Capewood Limited	
Burroughs Corporation	—	United States	1953	1986	Merged with Sperry Corporation to form Unisys	
CADO Systems	—	United States	1976	1983	Acquired by Contel Business Systems	
Callan Data Systems	—	United States	1980	1985	Bankruptcy	
Calma	General Electric (1980–1988)	United States	1965	1988	Broken up	
Canon Computer Systems	Canon Inc.	United States	1992	1997	Exited the computer business; dissolved in 2001	
Canon Inc.	—	Japan	1978	1992	Spun off computer division as Canon Computer Systems	
Celerity Computing	—	United States	1983	1988	Acquired by Floating Point Systems	
Centurion Computer Corporation	—	United States	1974	1985	Exited the computer business	
Chicony Electronics	—	Taiwan	1988	2000	Left the computer business; still active in peripheral business	
Cobalt Networks	—	United States	1996	2000	Acquired by Sun Microsystems	
Commodore International	—	United States	1976	1994	Bankruptcy	
Compagnie Internationale pour l'Informatique	—	France	1966	1976	Merged into Groupe Bull	
Comp-Sultants	—	United States	1969	1977	Dissolution	
Compaq	—	United States	1982	2002	Acquired by Hewlett-Packard; defunct as a subsidiary since 2013	
CompuAdd	—	United States	1982	1994	Bankruptcy	
CompuPro	—	United States	1980	1985	Restructured as Viasyn	
CompuSource	—	United States	1982	Unknown	Unknown	
Computervision	—	United States	1969	1998	Merged into Prime Computer	
Computer Automation	—	United States	1968	1992	Ceased operations in 1992	
Computer Control Company	—	United States	1953	1966	Acquired by Honeywell	
Computer Devices, Inc.	—	United States	1969	1998	Dissolution	
Computer Research Corporation	—	United States	1950	1953	Acquired by NCR Corporation	
Computer Transceiver Systems, Inc.	—	United States	1968	1998	Acquired by Vertex Industries in 1987 following bankruptcy; spun off and acquired by Mortgage Plus Equity and Loan Corporation in 1998	
Concurrent Computer Corporation	—	United States	1985	2017	Broken up	
Control Data Corporation	—	United States	1957	1992	Broken up from 1988 to 1992; remainder is now Ceridian	
Convergent Technologies	—	United States	1979	1988	Acquired by Unisys	
Convex Computer	—	United States	1982	1995	Purchased by Hewlett-Packard	
Corona Data Systems	Daewoo (1987–1993)	United States	1982	1993	Acquired by Daewoo in 1987; brand phased out in 1993	
Corvus Systems	—	United States	1979	1987	Bankruptcy	
CPT Corporation	—	United States	1971	Unknown	Dissolution	
Cray Computer Corporation	—	United States	1989	1995	Bankruptcy	
Cromemco	—	United States	1974	1987	Acquired by Dynatech	
Cydrome	—	United States	1984	1988	Dissolution	
Cumulus Computer Corporation	—	United States	1990	1992	Bankruptcy	
Daisy Systems	—	United States	1981	1990	Acquired by Intergraph	
Data General	—	United States	1968	1999	Acquired by EMC in 1999	
Dataindustrier AB	—	Sweden	1970	1990	Acquired by Groupe Bull	
Datapoint	—	United States	1968	2000	Bankruptcy	
Dauphin Technology	—	United States	1988	2006	Reverse merged with GeoVax	
Datavue	Intelligent Systems	United States	1983	Unknown	Unknown	
Dayna Communications	—	United States	1984	1997	Acquired by Intel	
Decision Data	—	United States	1969	1988	Acquired by Onset Corporation	
Deltagold	Delta Computer	United States	1986	1990	Bankruptcy	
DeskStation Technology	—	United States	1989	2000	Acquired by Samsung Electronics in 1998; division dissolved in 2000	
Digital Equipment Corporation	—	United States	1957	1998	Acquired by Compaq	
The Digital Group	—	United States	1975	1979	Bankruptcy	
DTK Computer	Datatech Enterprises	Taiwan	1981	2009	Dissolution; Dubai subsidiary is active as of November 2022	
Durango Systems Corporation	—	United States	1977	1984	Merged with Molecular Systems in 1982; Molecular went bankrupt in 1984	
Dynalogic	—	Canada	1982	1983	Acquired by Bytec	
Eagle Computer	—	United States	1978	1986	Dissolution	
ECD Corporation	—	United States	1974	1983	Dissolution	
Eckert–Mauchly Computer Corporation	—	United States	1946	1950	Acquired by Remington Rand	
EduQuest	IBM	United States	1992	1995	Discontinued computer lineup after reorganizing as IBM K–12 Education	
Eldorado Electrodata	—	United States	1968	1976	Dissolution	
ElectroData Corporation	—	United States	1954	1956	Acquired by Burroughs Corporation	
Electronic Associates	—	United States	1945	Unknown	Unknown	
Elektronorgtechnica	—	Soviet Union	1971	2005	Acquired by The Tetris Company in 2005	
Elonex	—	United Kingdom	1986	Unknown	Exited the computer business; currently sells tablets	
Elxsi	—	United States	1979	1989	Acquired by Tata Group	
eMachines	Gateway, Inc. (2004–2007); Acer Inc. (2007–2013)	United States	1998	2013	Acquired by Gateway, Inc., in 2004, in turn acquired by Acer Inc.; brand discontinued by Acer in 2013	
Encore Computer	—	United States	1983	1998	Acquired by Gores Technology Group and renamed to Encore Real Time Computing	
Engineering Research Associates	—	United States	1946	1952	Acquired by Remington Rand	
English Electric LEO Company	English Electric	United Kingdom	1963	1967	Acquired by International Computers Limited	
Escom AG	—	Germany	1986	1996	Bankruptcy	
ETA Systems	Control Data Corporation	United States	1983	1989	Dissolution	
Evans & Sutherland	—	United States	1986	1989	Exited the computer business	
Everex	Formosa Plastics Group (1993–2009)	United States (1983–1993); Taiwan (1993–2009)	1983	2009	Dissolution	
Evesham Technology	—	United Kingdom	1983	2008	Liquidation; assets purchased by Time Group	
Exxon Office Systems	Exxon Enterprises	United States	1981	1985	Acquired by Harris Corporation	
First Class Systems	—	United States	1989	1990	Dissolved	
Floating Point Systems	—	United States	1970	1991	Acquired by Cray	
Foonly	—	United States	1976	1989	Dissolution	
Fortune Systems	—	United States	1980	1987	Exited the computer business	
Franklin Computer Corporation	—	United States	1981	1986	Exited the computer business; reorganized into Franklin Electronic Publishers	
Friden, Inc.	—	United States	1957	1965	Acquired by Singer Corporation	
Gateway, Inc.	—	United States	1985	2007	Acquired by Acer; brand revived in the United States in 2020	
General Automation	—	United States	1968	Unknown	Unknown	
General Computer Corporation	—	United States	1981	2015	Dissolution	
General Electric	—	United States	1954	1970	Sold computer division to Honeywell	
Genisco Technology	—	United States	1983	1997	Bankruptcy	
Gericom	—	Austria	1990	2008	Acquired by Quanmax AG and merged with Systemhaus mit Eigentechnologie (S&T)	
Gimix	—	United States	1975	Unknown	Unknown	
Gnat Computers	—	United States	1976	1983	Acquired by Data Technology Industries	
GO Corporation	—	United States	1987	1994	Dissolution	
Gould Electronics	—	Germany	1981	1988	Sold computer division to Nippon Mining; division in turn sold to Encore Computer in 1988	
Grid Systems	Tandy Corporation (1988–1993)	United States	1979	1993	Acquired by Tandy Corporation; brand sold to UK investors in 1993, which still exists as Grid Defence Systems	
HAL Computer Systems	Fujitsu (1993–2001)	United States	1990	2001	Dissolution	
Handspring, Inc.	—	United States	1998	2003	Acquired by Palm, Inc.	
Harris Corporation	—	United States	1967	1994	Spun off computer division as Harris Computer Systems in 1994, itself acquired by Concurrent Computer Corporation in 1996	
Hazeltine Corporation	—	United States	1970	1986	Acquired by Emerson Electric	
Hewlett-Packard	—	United States	1980	2015	Broken up into Hewlett Packard Enterprise and HP Inc.	
Honeywell	—	United States	1957	1991	Sold computer division to Groupe Bull	
HTC	—	Taiwan	1997	2017	Sold computer division to Alphabet Inc.	
IMLAC	—	United States	1968	1979	Acquired by Hazeltine Corporation	
IMS Associates, Inc.	—	United States	1973	1979	Bankruptcy	
Inacom	—	United States	1991	2000	Bankruptcy	
Informer Computer Terminals	—	United States	1971	2007	Dissolution	
Ithaca InterSystems	—	United States	1976	1986	Dissolution	
Intelligence Technology Corporation	—	United States	1986	2000	Dissolution	
International Computers and Tabulators	—	United Kingdom	1959	1968	Acquired by International Computers Limited	
International Computers Limited	—	United Kingdom	1968	2002	Acquired by Fujitsu	
Intertec Data Systems	—	United States	1973	1991	Bankruptcy	(Note: Later known as Wells American)
Iskra Delta	—	Slovenia	1974	2021	Bankruptcy	
Jetta International	—	United States	1991	Unknown	Dissolution	
Jonos	Phoenix Group (1989–1992)	United States	1982	1992	Bankruptcy	
Jupiter Cantab	—	United Kingdom	1982	1983	Bankruptcy	
Kaypro	Non-Linear Systems	United States	1981	1992	Bankruptcy	
Kenbak Corporation	—	United States	1970	1973	Acquired by CTI Education Products	
Kendall Square Research	—	United States	1986	1994	Bankruptcy	
Kohjinsha	—	Japan	2004	Unknown	Dissolution	
Korea Data Systems	—	South Korea	1998	2003	Left the computer business	
LanSlide Gaming PCs	—	United States	2005	2011	Dissolution	
Lap Power	—	Sweden	1991	2000	Bankruptcy	
Leading Edge Products	Daewoo (1989–1995); Manuhold Investment AG (1995–1997)	United States	1980	1997	Acquired by Daewoo; division in turn sold to Manuhold Investment AG; brand phased out in 1997	
Leading Technology	—	United States	1985	1992	Acquired by VTech	
Léanord	—	France	1960	1989	Merged with Intertechnique	
Librascope	Singer Corporation (until 1992)	United States	1956	1992	Acquired by Loral Space & Communications	
Librex Computer Systems	Nippon Steel Corporation	United States	1990	1993	Dissolution	
Linus Technologies	—	United States	1985	1990	Dissolution	
Lisp Machines	—	United States	1979	1987	Bankruptcy	
LogAbax	—	France	1947	1988	Bought by Olivetti	
Logical Machine Corporation	—	United States	1974	Unknown	Dissolution	(Note: Originally John Peers and Company, later known as Logical Business Machines)
Luxor AB	—	Sweden	1978	1986	Sold computer division to Nokia in 1985; brand phased out in 1986	
Mad Computers	—	United States	1982	Unknown	Unknown	
Magnavox	Philips	United States	1972	1991	Magnavox-branded computers discontinued in 1992	
Magnuson Computer Systems	—	United States	1977	1983	Bankruptcy	
Martin Research	—	United States	1974	1986	Acquired by Zebra Technologies	(Note: Later renamed to Quint Systems)
MASSCOMP	—	United States	1981	1988	Acquired by Concurrent Computer Corporation	
MasPar	—	United States	1987	1999	Acquired by Accrue Software	
Maxdata	—	Germany	1987	2008	Dissolution; warranty claims taken over by Swiss Belinea AG, itself acquired by Bluechip Computer	
Meebox	—	Mexico	2009	Unknown	Dissolution	
Metaphor Computer Systems	—	United States	1982	1994	Acquired by IBM	
Micro Craft	—	United States	1981	1987	Dissolution; restructured as Dimension Electronics in 1987	
Micro Instrumentation and Telemetry Systems	—	United States	1969	1977	Acquired by Pertec Computer	
Microdata Corporation	—	United States	1969	1983	Acquired by McDonnell Douglas	
Micron Technology	—	United States	1991	2001	Spun off computer division as MPC Corporation	
Micromation	—	United States	1978	1983	Unknown	
Micronics Computers	—	United States	1986	1998	Acquired by Diamond Multimedia	
MicroOffice	—	United States	1981	1985	Acquired by Telxon Corporation in 1985	
Micros Systems	—	United States	1978	2014	Acquired by Oracle Corporation	
Midwest Scientific Instruments	—	United States	1972	1985	Dissolution	
Mitsubishi Electric	Mitsubishi Group	Japan	1960	1990	Exited the computer business	
Modcomp	—	United States	1970	Unknown	Exited the computer business; survives today as CSPi Technology Solutions, a systems integrator	
Mohawk Data Sciences Corporation	—	United States	1964	1988	Acquired by Decision Data; previously restructured as Qantel Corporation	
Monorail Inc.	—	United States	1995	2005	Dissolution	
Motion Computing	—	United States	2001	2015	Acquired by Xplore Technologies	
MPC Corporation	—	United States	2001	2008	Bankruptcy	
Motorola	—	United States	1974	2011	Dissolution	
Multiflow	—	United States	1984	1990	Dissolution	
Mycron	—	Norway	1975	1999	Exited the computer industry	
NBI Incorporated	—	United States	Unknown	1991	Bankruptcy	
nCUBE	—	United States	1983	2005	Acquired by C-COR	
Neoware	—	United States	1992	2007	Acquired by Hewlett-Packard	
Network Computing Devices	—	United States	1987	2004	Dissolution	
NeXT	—	United States	1985	1997	Acquired by Apple Computer	
Nixdorf Computer	—	West Germany	1952	1990	Acquired by Siemens; renamed Siemens Nixdorf Informationssysteme AG	
Norsk Data	—	Norway	1967	1992	Acquired by Telenor	
Northgate Computer Systems	—	United States	1987	1997	Acquired by Lan Plus, after filing for Chapter 11 bankruptcy in 1994	
Northwest Microcomputer Systems	—	United States	1977	1982	Dissolution	
North Star Computers	—	United States	1976	1989	Dissolution	
Noval, Inc.	Gremlin Industries (1977–1978); Sega (1978–1979)	United States	1977	1979	Dissolution	
Ohio Scientific	—	United States	1975	1980	Acquired by M/A-COM	
Olivetti	—	Italy	1955	1997	Exited the computer business	
Omnidata	—	United States	1978	1988	Dissolution	
Onyx Systems	—	United States	1979	1985	Acquired by Corvus Systems	
Osborne Computer Corporation	—	United States	1980	1985	Dissolution; assets and name sold to Mikrolog Ltd, of Finland	
Otrona	—	United States	1981	1984	Bankruptcy	
Outbound Systems	—	United States	1989	1993	Bankruptcy	
Pacific Cyber/Metrix	—	United States	1975	2001	Dissolution	
Packard Bell	—	United States	1986	2008	Majority stake purchased by NEC in 1995; stake relinquished in 2006; eventually acquired by Acer Inc. in 2008	
Packard Bell Computer Corporation	Packard Bell Corporation	United States	1957	1964	Acquired by Raytheon Company	
Panda Project	—	United States	1992	1998	Exited the computer business	
Pandigital, Inc.	—	United States	1998	2012	Bankruptcy	
Parallan Computer	—	United States	1986	1994	Exited the computer business	
Parasitic Engineering	—	United States	1976	1983	Dissolution	
Pencept	—	United States	1980	Unknown	Unknown	
Pertec Computer	—	United States	1967	1987	Acquired by Triumph-Adler	
Philco	—	United States	1954	1961	Exited the computer business before being acquired by Ford Motor Company	
Philips	—	Netherlands	1953	1991	Sold computer division to Digital Equipment Corporation	
PolyMorphic Systems	—	United States	1976	Unknown	Unknown	
Poqet Computer Corporation	—	United States	1989	1992	Acquired by Fujitsu	
Power Computing Corporation	—	United States	1993	1998	Acquired by Apple Computer	
Prime Computer	—	United States	1972	1998	Acquired by Parametric Technology Corporation	
Processor Technology	—	United States	1975	1979	Dissolution	
Pronto Computers	—	United States	1983	1987	Bankruptcy	
Psystar Corporation	—	United States	2008	2009	Exited the computer business following permanent injunction to stop selling computers with Apple's Mac OS X	
Pyramid Technology	—	United States	1981	1995	Acquired by Siemens	
Q1 Corporation	—	United States	1971	1974	Acquired by Nixdorf Computer	
Quantex Microsystems	—	United States	1984	2000	Bankruptcy	
Quasar Data Products	—	United States	1978	1986	Dissolution	
Réalisation d'Études Électroniques	—	France	1970	1980	Taken over by Groupe Bull	
Radio Shack	Tandy Corporation	United States	1977	1983	Branding subsumed by the Tandy name in 1983	
Raytheon Company	—	United States	1949	1984	Spun off as Raytheon Data Systems in 1971, itself acquired by Telex Corporation in 1984	
RCA	—	United States	1956	1971	Exited the computer business in 1971; division sold to Sperry Rand in 1972	
Reeves Instrument Corporation	—	United States	1944	1995	Unknown	
Remington Rand	—	United States	1950	1955	Acquired by Sperry Corporation to form Sperry Rand	
Regnecentralen	—	Denmark	1955	1989	Acquired by International Computers Limited	
Reply Corporation	—	United States	1988	1997	Acquired by Radius Inc.	
Ridge Computers	—	United States	1982	1990	Dissolution	
RGS Electronics	—	United States	1974	Unknown	Dissolution	
ROLM	IBM (1984–1998)	United States	1969	1998	Acquired by Siemens	
Seattle Computer Products	—	United States	1978	Unknown	Dissolution	
Sanyo	—	Japan	1982	2009	Acquired by Panasonic	
Scientific Data Systems	—	United States	1961	1969	Acquired by Xerox	
Sequent Computer Systems	—	United States	1983	1999	Acquired by IBM	
Siemens	—	Germany	1955	2009	Siemens Nixdorf Informationssysteme AG merged with Fujitsu into Fujitsu Siemens Computers in 1999; remaining stake sold to Fujitsu in 2009	
Silicon Graphics International	—	United States	1982	2016	Formerly Rackable Systems, Inc., it acquired Silicon Graphics, Inc. in 2009; acquired by Hewlett Packard Enterprise in 2016	
Silicon Graphics, Inc.	—	United States	1981	2009	Acquired by Rackable Systems, Inc., to become Silicon Graphics International	
SIMIV	—	France	1982	1989	Exited the computer business	
Sinclair Research	—	United Kingdom	1978	1986	Acquired by Amstrad	
Sirius Systems Technology	—	United States	1980	1984	Acquired by Datatronic AB	
Smoke Signal Broadcasting	—	United States	1977	1991	Dissolution	
SMT Goupil	—	France	1979	1991	Bankruptcy	
Société d'Electronique et d'Automatisme	—	France	1947	1966	Merged within CII	
Société européenne de mini-informatique et systèmes	—	France	1976	1982	Merged into Groupe Bull	
Solbourne Computer	—	United States	1986	2008	Acquired by Deloitte Consulting	
Sony	—	Japan	1982	2014	Exited the computer business	
Soyo Group	—	United States	1985	2009	Bankruptcy	
Spectravideo	—	United States	1981	1988	Acquired by SpectraVideo plc, unrelated holding company from the United Kingdom	
Sperry Corporation	—	United States	1953	1986	Merged with Burroughs to form Unisys; company was formerly Sperry Rand until it dropped Rand from its name in 1978 and continued as Sperry	
Sperry Rand	—	United States	1955	1978	Reverted to Sperry Corporation name in 1978	
Stardent Inc.	—	United States	1989	1994	Restructured as Kubota Graphics in 1994; dissolved the same year	
Sun Microsystems	—	United States	1982	2010	Acquired by Oracle Corporation	
Southwest Technical Products Corporation	—	United States	1975	1990	Dissolution	
STM Systems	—	United States	1976	Unknown	Unknown	
Sycor	—	United States	1967	Unknown	Unknown	
Symbiotic Systems	—	United States	1977	1983	Dissolution	
Symbolics	—	United States	1980	1996	Bankruptcy	
Syntrex	—	United States	1979	1992	Dissolution	
Systemax	—	United States	1981	2021	Exited the computer business	
Systems Engineering Laboratories	—	United States	1959	1981	Acquired by Gould Electronics	
Systime Computers	—	United States	1973	1989	Acquired by Control Data Corporation; broken up in 1989	
T-Platforms	—	Russia	2002	2023	Bankruptcy	
Tadpole Computer	—	United States	1994	2005	Acquired by General Dynamics	
Tandem Computers	—	United States	1976	1998	Acquired by Compaq; then Hewlett Packard Enterprise	
Tandon Corporation	—	United States	1975	1993	Dissolution	
Tandy Corporation	—	United States	1977	1993	Sold computer division to AST Research; former parent company of Radio Shack	
Tangerine Computer Systems	—	United Kingdom	1979	1987	Bankruptcy	
Télémécanique	—	France	1968	1976	Computer division merged with CII's minicomputer division to become Société européenne de mini-informatique et systèmes (SEMS)	
Tava Corporation	—	United States	1983	1984	Acquired by Replitech	
Terak Corporation	—	United States	1975	1985	Acquired by Sanders Associates	
TeleVideo	—	United States	1975	2011	Dissolution	
Teleram	—	United States	1973	1985	Bankruptcy	
Texas Instruments	—	United States	1979	1997	Sold computer division to Acer Inc.	
Thinking Machines Corporation	—	United States	1983	1994	Bankruptcy; hardware and software divisions acquired by Sun Microsystems	
Three Rivers Computer Corporation	—	United States	1974	1985	Bankruptcy	
Tiki Data	—	Norway	1983	1996	Acquired by Merkantildata	
Timex Sinclair	—	United States	1982	1984	Dissolution	(Note: Joint venture between Sinclair Research and Timex Corporation)
Tiny Computers	—	United Kingdom	1996	2002	Acquired by Time Group; brand phased out in 2005	
Toshiba	—	Japan	1954	2016	Discontinued computer lineup in 2016; computer business restructured as Dynabook Inc. in 2018, with majority of its shares sold to Sharp Corporation the same year; remaining shares sold to Sharp in 2020	
TriGem	—	South Korea	1980	2010	Bankruptcy	
Trilogy Systems	—	United States	1980	1985	Acquired by Elxsi	
TRW Inc.	—	United States	1959	2002	Acquired by Northrop Grumman	
Tulip Computers	—	Netherlands	1979	2009	Bankruptcy; previously restructured as Nedfield NV in 2008	
Umtech	—	United States	1976	1979	Acquired by Cha Group	
V3 Gaming PC	—	United States	2010	2016	Dissolution	
Varian Data Machines	—	United States	1967	1977	Acquired by Sperry Rand	
VEB Robotron	—	German Democratic Republic	1969	1990	Liquidated / converted into separate corporations and sold off	
Vector Graphic	—	United States	1976	1987	Dissolution	
Vestel	—	United States	1984	Unknown	Exited the computer business	
Viasyn	—	United States	1985	1991	Dissolution	
Viatron	—	United States	1967	1971	Bankruptcy	
ViewSonic	—	United States	2001	2012	Left the computer business; still active in monitor business	
Vigor Gaming	—	United States	2004	2010	Bankruptcy	
VoodooPC	—	United States	1991	2009	Acquired by Hewlett-Packard in 2006; brand retired in 2009	
VTech	—	Hong Kong	1976	1997	Spun off computer division as PC Partner	
Walton Group	—	Bangladesh	1977	Unknown	Exited the computer business	
Wang Laboratories	—	United States	1951	1999	Acquired by Getronics	
Wicat Systems	—	United States	1980	1992	Acquired by Jostens	
Wipro	—	India	1977	Unknown	Exited the computer business	
Wyse	—	United States	1981	2012	Acquired by Dell	
Xerox	—	United States	1969	2014	Exited the computer business	
Xybernaut	—	United States	1990	2005	Bankruptcy	
Zenith Data Systems	Zenith Electronics (1979–1991); Groupe Bull (1991–1996)	United States	1979	1996	Acquired by Groupe Bull in 1991; sold to NEC in 1996, who merged it into Packard Bell	
Zeos	—	United States	1987	1995	Acquired by Micron Technology	
Zeda Computers	—	United States	1974	Unknown	Unknown	
Zonbu	—	United States	2006	Unknown	Dissolution	

== See also ==
- Market share of personal computer vendors
- List of computer hardware manufacturers
- List of laptop brands and manufacturers
- List of touch-solution manufacturers
