= Gigabyte Technology =

Taiwanese computer hardware company

Gigabyte Technology Co., Ltd.

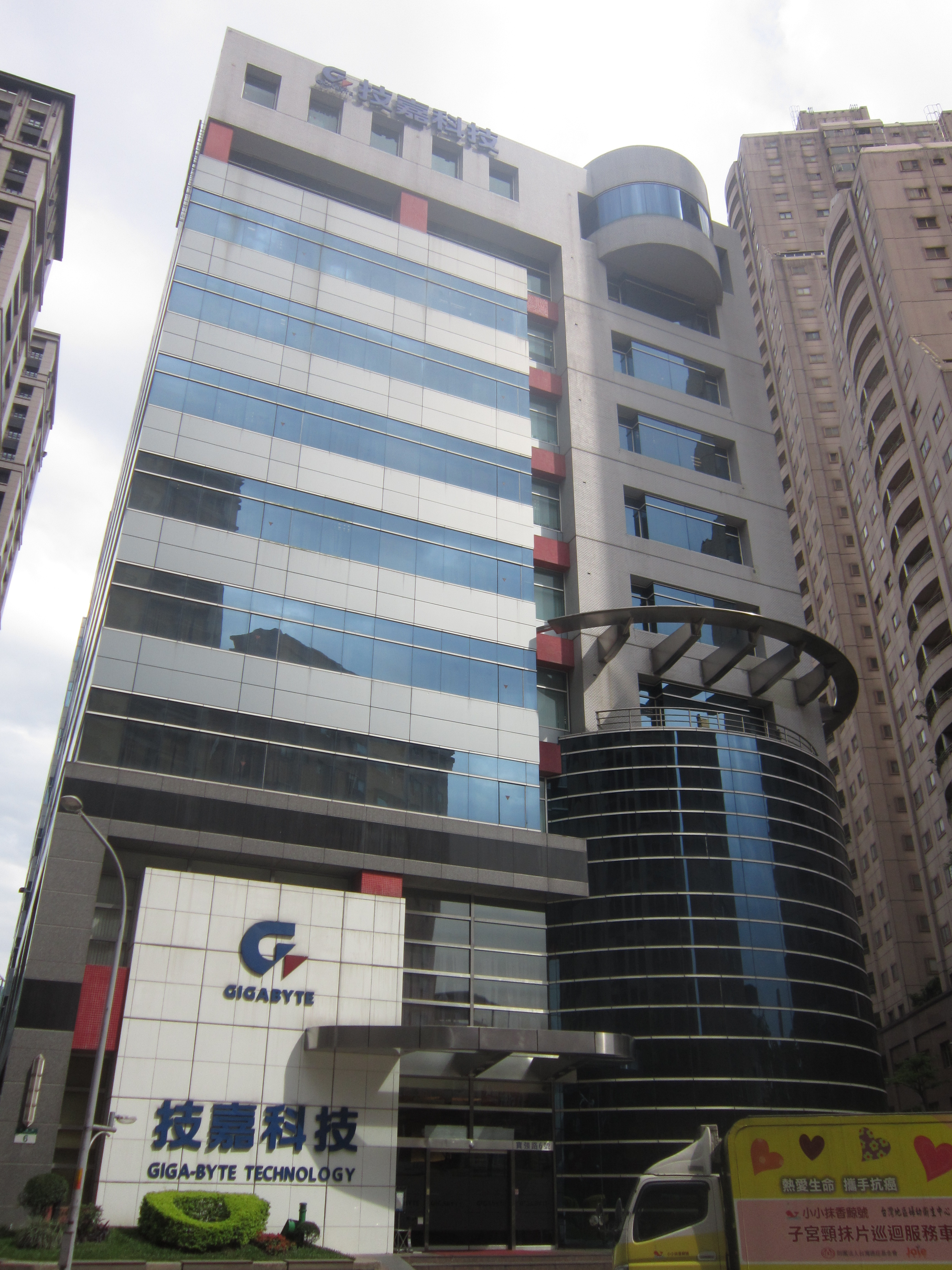
- Headquarters
- Native name: 技嘉科技
- Type: Public
- Traded as: TWSE: 2376
- Industry: Computer hardware Consumer electronics
- Founded: 30 April 1986; 40 years ago
- Founder: Pei-Chen Yeh
- Headquarters: Xindian District, New Taipei City, Taiwan
- Area served: Worldwide
- Key people: Pei-Cheng Yeh (chairman); Ming-Hsiung Liu (CEO)
- Products: Personal computers; Motherboards; Graphics cards; Power supply units; PC components; Peripherals; Monitors; Server hardware
- Revenue: ▲NT$136 billion (US$4.87 billion) (2023)
- Operating income: ▼NT$4.8 billion (US$171.85 million) (2023)
- Net income: ▼NT$4.7 billion (US$168.27 million) (2023)
- Number of employees: 2,040 (2024)
- Subsidiaries: Aorus; Giga Computing
- Website: www.gigabyte.com

Gigabyte Technology Co., Ltd. (commonly referred to as Gigabyte Technology or simply Gigabyte) is a Taiwanese manufacturer and distributor of computer hardware.

Gigabyte's principal business is motherboards. It shipped 4.8 million motherboards in the first quarter of 2015, which allowed it to become the leading motherboard vendor. Gigabyte also manufactures custom graphics cards and laptop computers (including thin and light laptops under its Aero sub-brand). In 2010, Gigabyte was ranked 17th in "Taiwan's Top 20 Global Brands" by the Taiwan External Trade Development Council.

The company is publicly held and traded on the Taiwan Stock Exchange, stock ID number TWSE: 2376.

== History ==
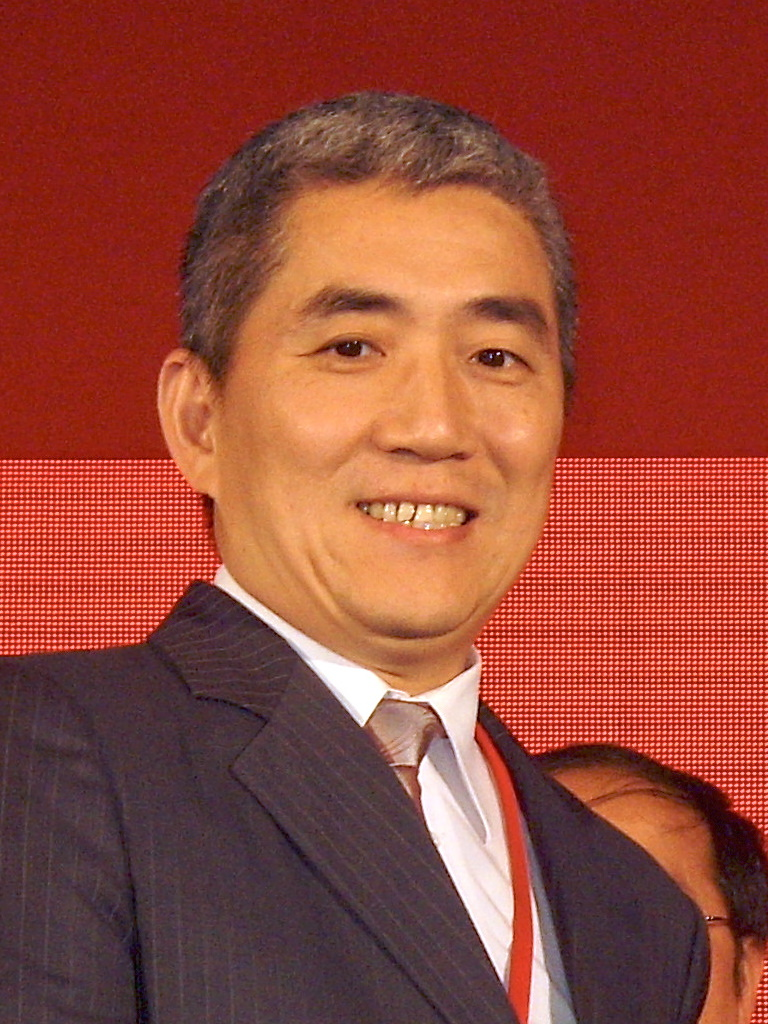
Gigabyte founder Pei-Cheng Yeh

Gigabyte Technology was established in 1986 by Pei-Cheng Yeh.

One of Gigabyte's key advertised features on its motherboards is its "Ultra Durable" construction, advertised with "all solid capacitors". On 8 August 2006 Gigabyte announced a joint venture with Asus. Gigabyte developed the world's first software-controlled power supply in July 2007.

An innovative method to charge the iPad and iPhone on the computer was introduced by Gigabyte in April 2010. Gigabyte launched the world's first Z68 motherboard on 31 May 2011, with an on-board mSATA connection for Intel SSD and Smart Response Technology. On 2 April 2012, Gigabyte released the world's first motherboard with 60A ICs from International Rectifier.

In 2023, researchers at firmware-focused cybersecurity company Eclypsium said 271 models of Gigabyte motherboards are affected by backdoor vulnerabilities. Whenever a computer with the affected Gigabyte motherboard restarts, code within the motherboard's firmware initiates an updater program that downloads and executes another piece of software. Gigabyte has said it plans to fix the issues.

== Products ==
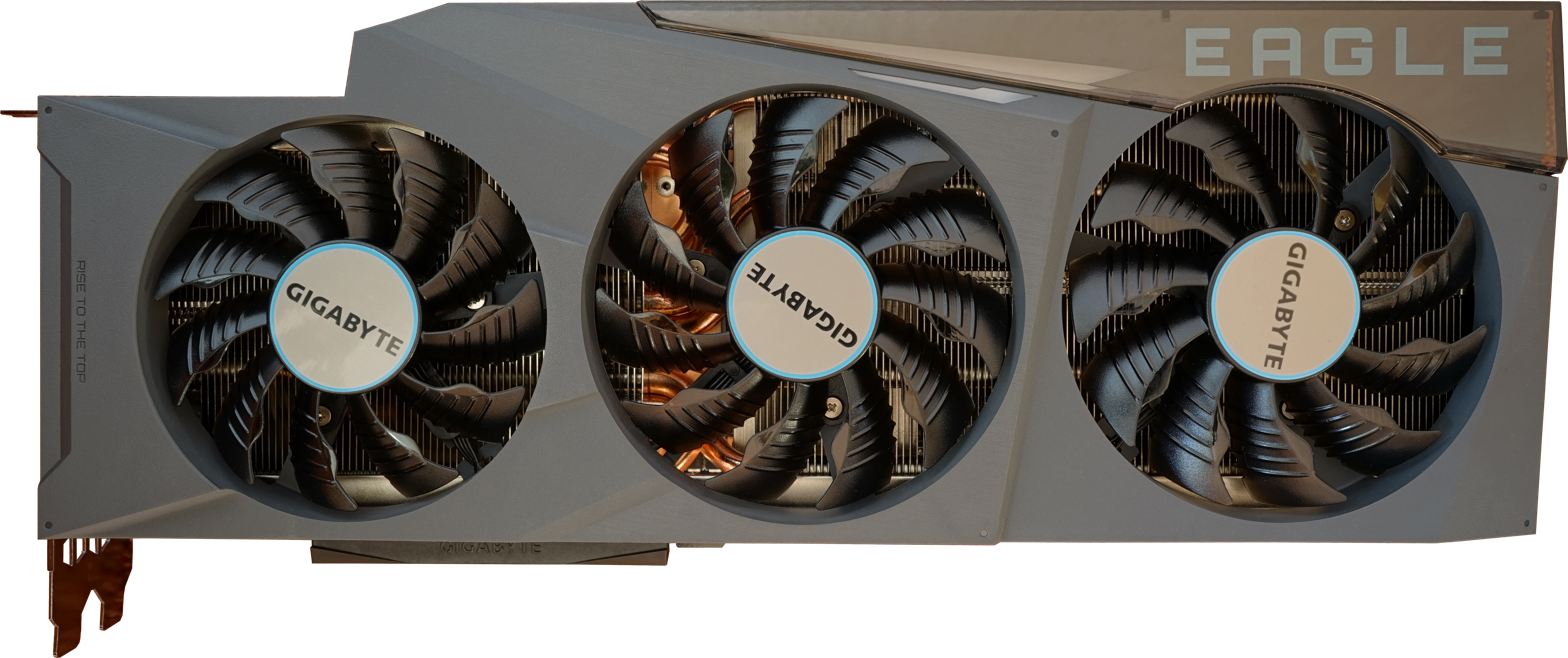
Gigabyte GeForce RTX 3090 graphics card

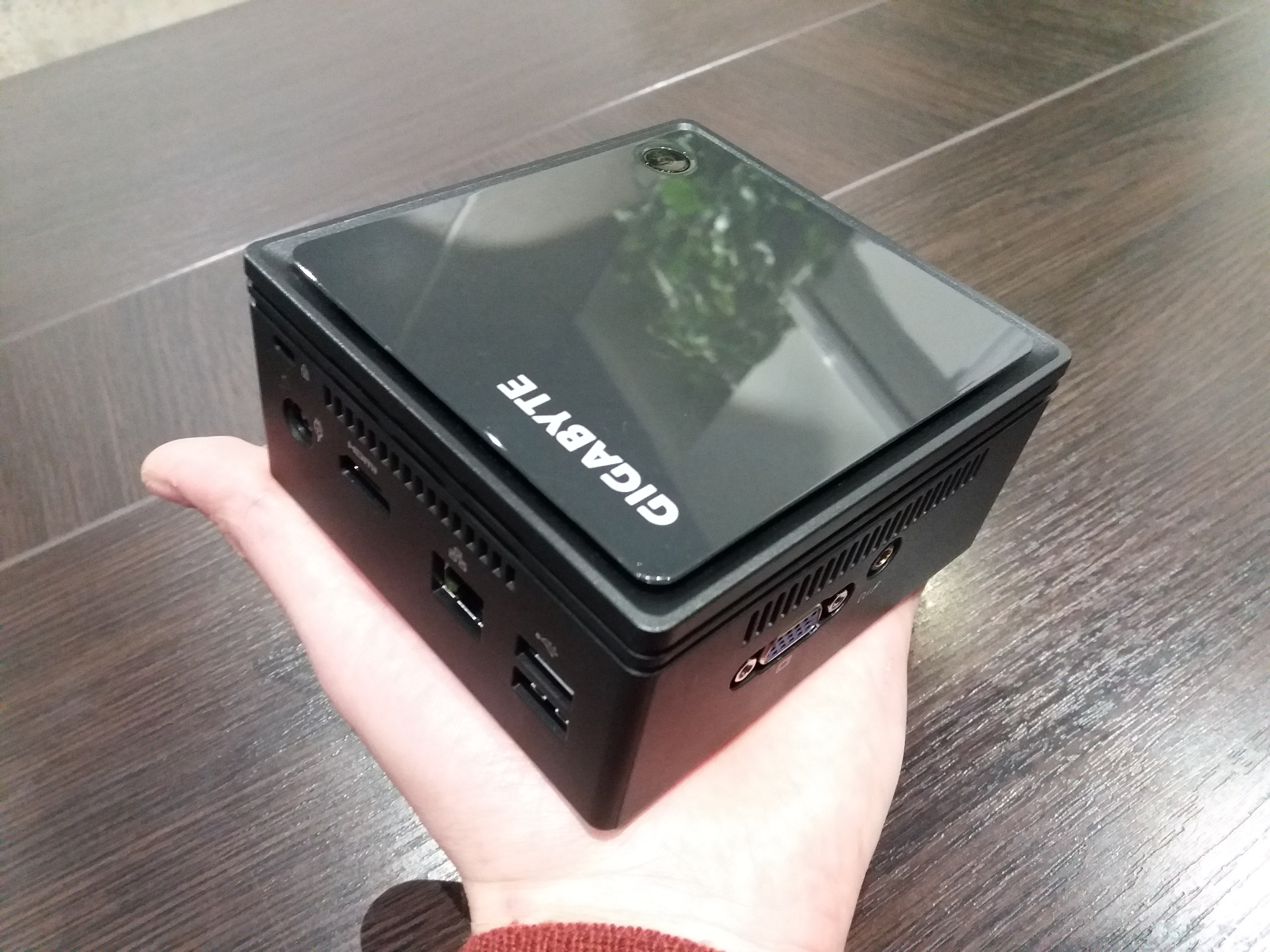
Gigabyte Brix Mini Computer

Gigabyte designs and manufactures motherboards for both AMD and Intel platforms, and also produces graphics cards and notebooks in partnership with AMD and Nvidia, including Nvidia's Turing chipsets and AMD's Vega and Polaris chipsets. Gigabyte's components are used by Alienware, Falcon Northwest, CybertronPC, Origin PC, and exclusively in Technology Direct desktops.

Other products of Gigabyte have included GPU servers, data center solutions, desktop computers, tablet computers, ultrabooks, mobile phones, personal digital assistants, server motherboards, server racks, networking equipment, optical drives, computer monitors, mice, keyboards, cooling components, power supplies, and cases.

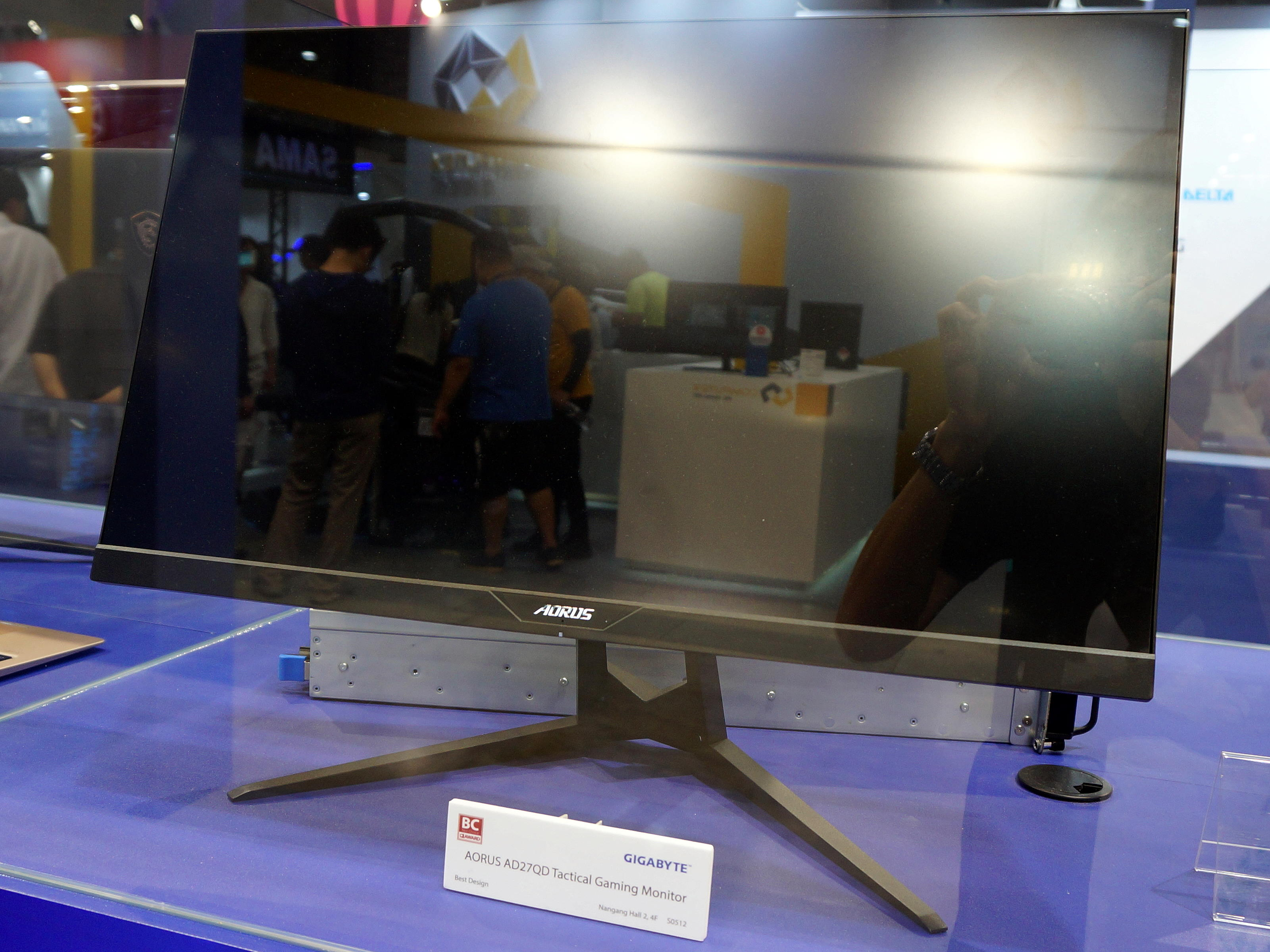
Aorus AD27QD monitor

== Subsidiaries ==
Aorus is a registered sub-brand trademark of Gigabyte belonging to Aorus Pte. Ltd., which is a company registered in Singapore. Aorus specializes in gaming-related products such as motherboards, graphics cards, notebooks, mice, keyboards, SSDs, headsets, cases, power supply and CPU coolers.

== See also ==
- List of companies of Taiwan
