= American Computer and Peripheral =

American computer company

American Computer and Peripheral, Inc.

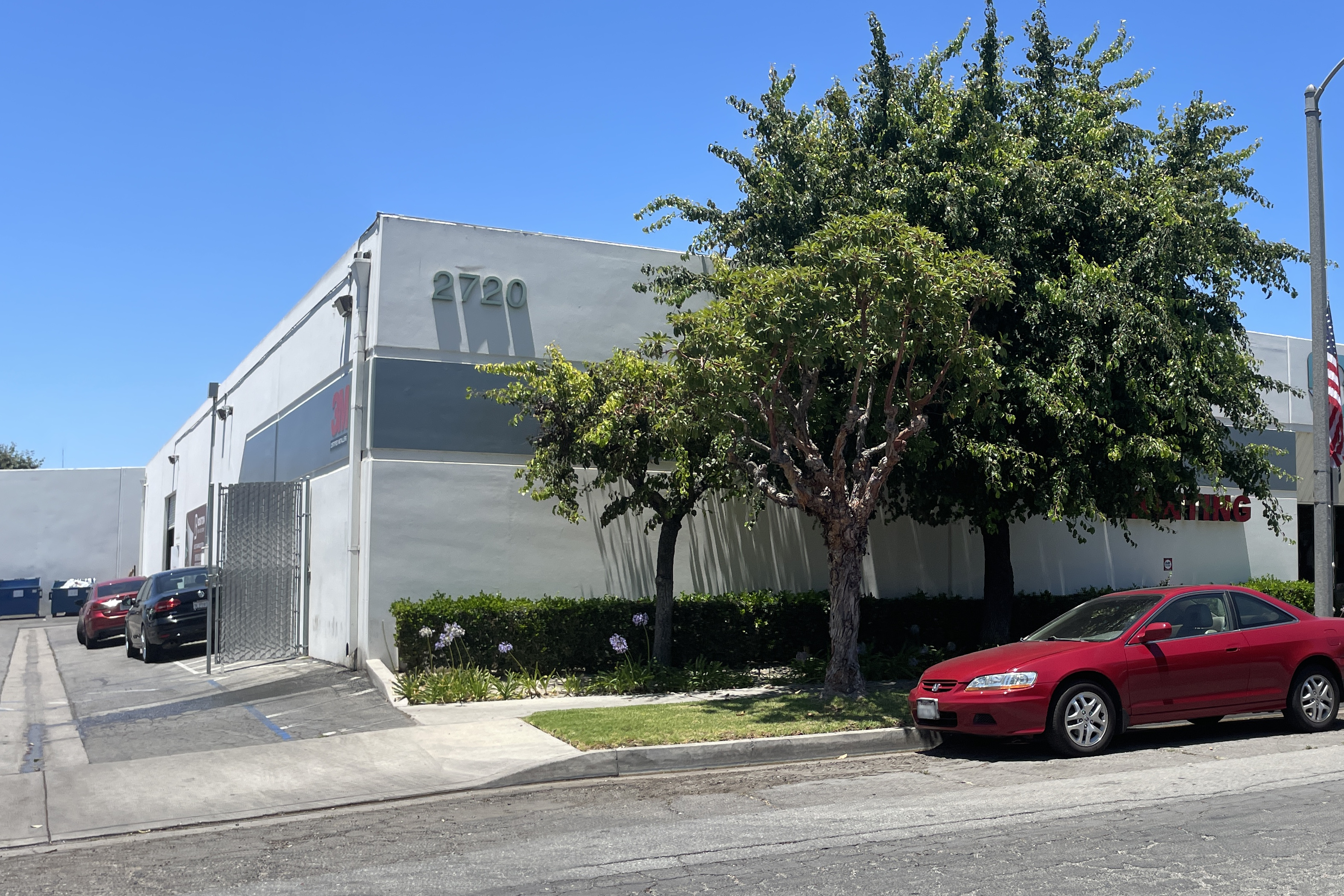
- Former headquarters in Santa Ana, California
- Type: Private
- Industry: Computer
- Founded: April 1985; 41 years ago in Santa Ana, California, United States
- Founder: Alan Lau
- Defunct: February 1990; 36 years ago
- Products: American XTSR; American 286; 386 Translator; 386 Turbo

American Computer and Peripheral, Inc. (AC&P), also written as American Computer & Peripheral, was an American computer company based in Santa Ana, California. The company was founded in 1985 by Alan Lau and released several expansion boards for the IBM PC as well as a few PC clones before going bankrupt in December 1989. Obscure in its own time, the company's 386 Translator was the first plug-in board for Intel's newly released 80386 processor and the first mass-market computing device to offer consumers a means of using the 386 in July 1986.

== History ==
=== PC clones and peripherals ===
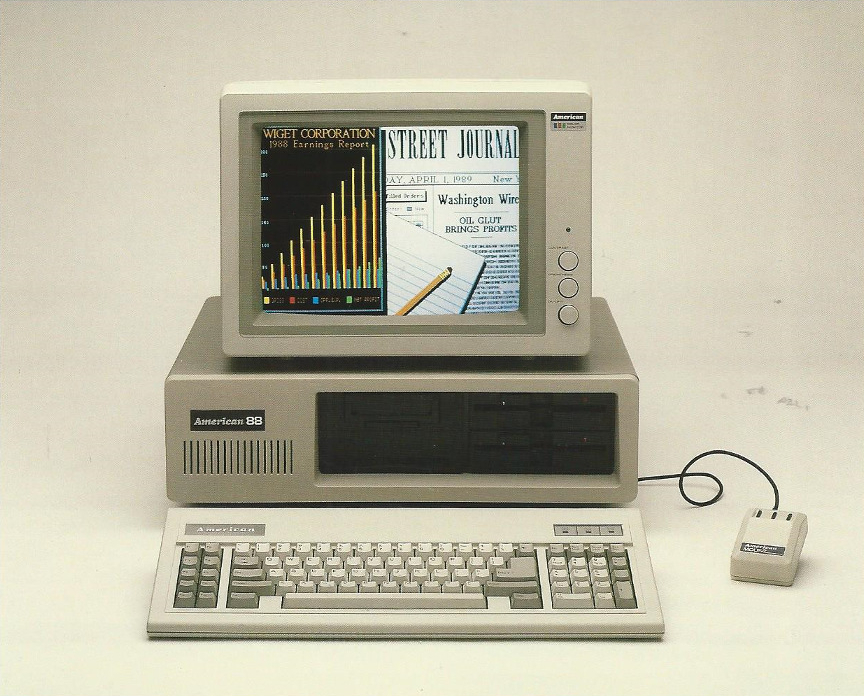
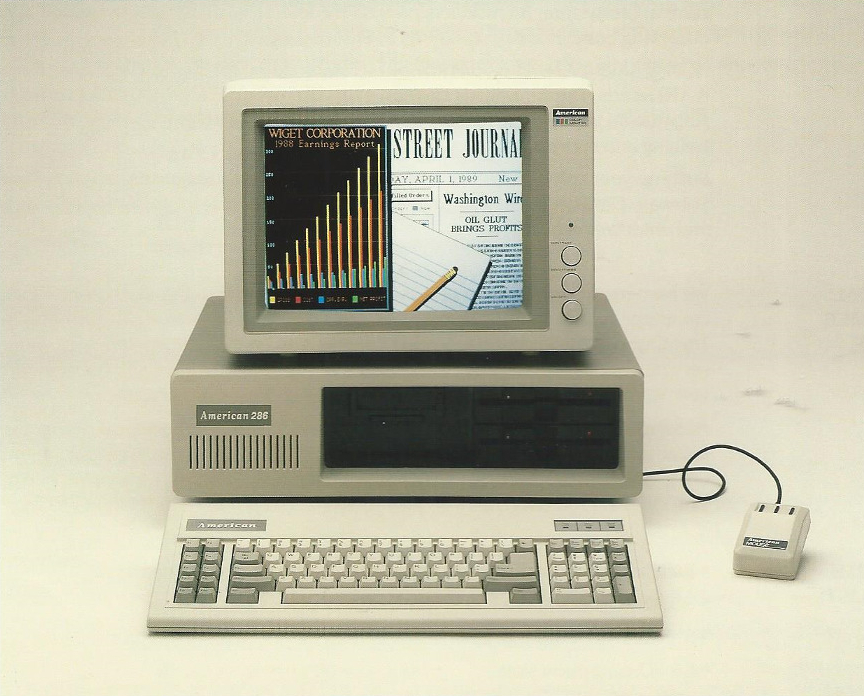
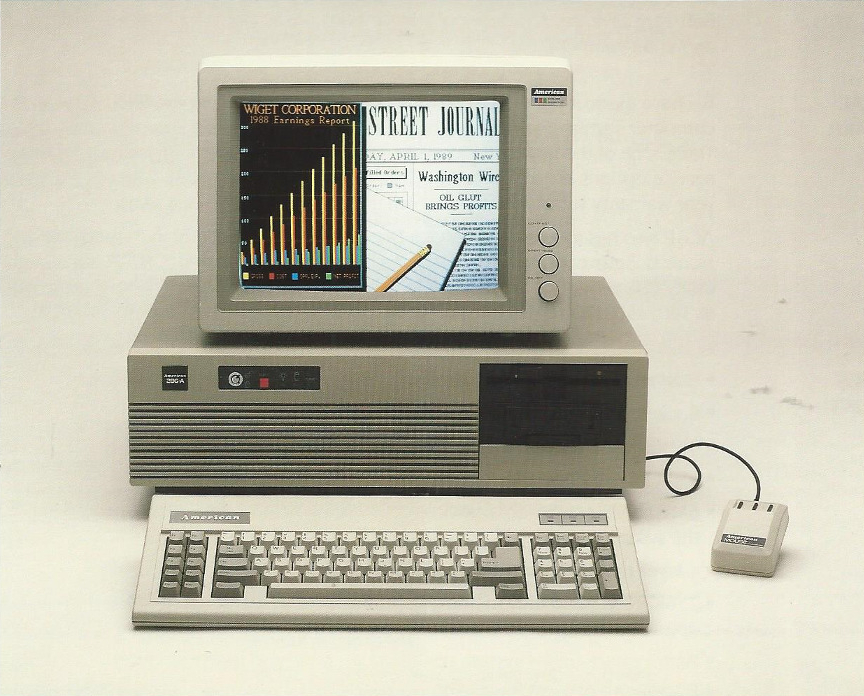
Various AC&P PC clones; from top to bottom: the American 88, the American 286, and the American 286-A

American Computer and Peripheral was founded in Santa Ana in April 1985 by Alan Lau. Among the company's first offerings were a duo of IBM PC clones: the American XTSR and the American 286. These clones were introduced in May 1986 and were clones of IBM's PC XT and PC/AT, respectively. The clock speed of the XTSR's Intel 8088 microprocessor was selectable, allowing users to change it from 4.77 MHz to 7.37 MHz. The module that allowed this selection of clock speeds was later sold separately as the American Turbo. (Note: A version of the XTSR with the module removed, which limited the clock speed to 4.77 MHz, was sold as the American 88 (Staff writer 1986b, p. 124)) The American 286 featured a motherboard in the Baby AT form factor with five expansion slots housed in the same case as the American XTSR. AC&P later introduced the American 286-A, an AT clone with a full-sized AT motherboard, featuring eight expansion slots. AC&P hired Chi Yeung, previously a designer for Eagle Computer before the company went out of business in 1986, to design the 286-A. Both it and the regular 286 ran the Intel 80286, with clock speeds selectable from 6 MHz to 8 MHz. AC&P was one of the few companies based in the United States that designed and fabricated its own motherboards domestically.

In June 1986, the company released the Abovefunction multifunction board that allows the PC, PC XT and compatibles to address up to 2 MB of RAM, as well as adding ports for joysticks and serial and peripheral devices. A year later, the company introduced the American 386-16, an i386-based desktop computer that touted superiority over other 386 clones due to its use of zero-wait states when accessing video and making system calls to the BIOS for peripheral access. By the end of 1985, American achieved sales of US$7.5 million (equivalent to US$22.45 million in 2025). In 1987, AC&P signed an $8-million agreement with Arrow Electronics to manufacture AC&P's computers in the state of New York.

=== Upgrade devices ===
In June 1986, AC&P released the 386 Translator. This was a module that could be plugged into the pin-grid array socket reserved for the 80286 microprocessor on the motherboard of IBM's PC/AT or clones of the AT, in order to upgrade them to the newer 80386 by Intel. This product allowed AC&P to beat Compaq by a slim margin in offering consumers the first means through which they could interact with the 386. Compaq released the Deskpro 386, the first PC clone that featured a 386—and which marked the first time a major component to the IBM PC standard was upgraded by a company outside IBM—in September 1986. (Note: Advanced Logic Research had announced a PC clone with a 386 alongside AC&P's 386 Translator in the summer of 1986 (Chabal & Ranney 1986, p. 8). However, they were beaten to market by Compaq (Warner 1986, p. 1).) The 386 Translator was designed by NDR, a electronics design firm located in Corona, California. Scheduled for release as soon as Intel started shipping the chip out to computer vendors like AC&P, which occurred in mid-July along with Intel shipping production samples of the 386 to consumers, AC&P launched the 386 Translator ahead of time in late June.

Various companies such as Daisy Systems and Valid Logic Systems manufactured software development workstations equipped with the 386 microprocessor and running Intel's own assembler, compilers, and software utilities as early as December 1985, when pre-production batches of 386es were manufactured. However, these workstations were large, cumbersome to set up and expensive, costing several thousands of dollars. The 386 Translator, by comparison, cost $895 (equivalent to $2,629 in 2025) with a 386 included or $395 ($1,160 in 2025) without. In addition, existing ATs could be equipped with the 386 using AC&P's module, avoiding the need for a dedicated workstation. Counter-intuitive to the nature of an upgrade module, however, the 386 Translator ran an AT computer 10 percent slower than a stock computer with a 286. This was due to the module inserting wait states in order for slower AT-grade memory chips to work with the faster 386. Aside from this performance penalty, the 386 Translator allowed software developers with ATs to get a head start on learning 386's new virtual 8086 mode. According to David Springer of NDR, the 386 Translator was also targeted at high-end users wanting to set up a file server on an AT-class machine. Following the release of the 386 Translator, American projected sales of US$25 million (equivalent to US$73.43 million in 2025) and reportedly exhausted its storage facility in Santa Ana.

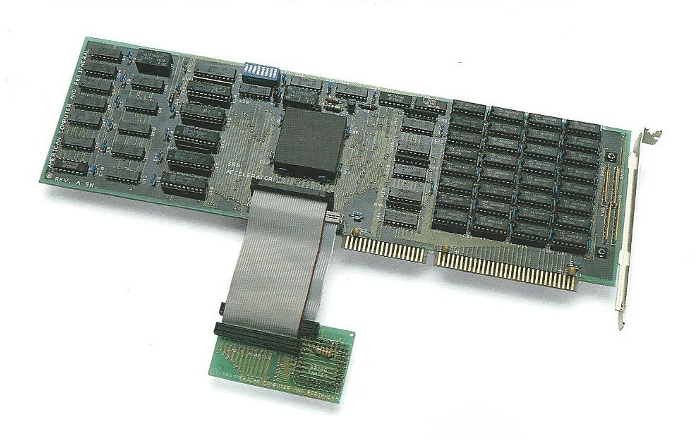
386 Turbo, showing ISA card with 386 and processor module connected via two ribbon cables

Just three months after the release of the 386 Translator, in November, AC&P introduced the 386 Turbo expansion board. Like the Translator, the Turbo board allowed users to upgrade their existing PC/ATs with the 386 processor, this time with the promise of increased speed over the AT's 286 processor. The Turbo 386 also advertised compatibility with AT clones, although only clones whose motherboards had a socket for the pin grid array package of the 286 were supported. The company touted a 400 percent increase in software performance and claimed that the Turbo could double the clock speeds of ATs running between 6 and 12 MHz. The company later revised their claim to only double the clock speeds of 6 and 8 MHz 286s, as 386 processors at the time were not rated for 24 MHz. The 386 Turbo allowed users to switch the clock speed of the 386 on the fly, and it also included 1 MB of cache memory.

AC&P recommissioned NDR for the design of the 386 Turbo. It was comparable to Intel's Inboard 386, which came out at the same time. Both boards plugged into one of the AT's 16-bit ISA expansion slots. While Intel offered a version of the Inboard that could work on XTs, the 386 Turbo could only be used by ATs. The Turbo's 1 MB of memory was strictly used for cache, while the Inboard could accept up to 4 MB of memory chips to be used as conventional RAM, on top of having 64 KB of cache memory itself. The Turbo was to be accompanied by a graphics accelerator card, dubbed the "Turbo Graphics Adapter", which would have included a 82786 graphics processing unit for use with CAD–CAM systems. Scheduled for release alongside the 386 Translator in November, it was ultimately shelved.

== Reputation ==
Despite the company's strong sales for a small computer hardware company, AC&P's peripherals received mixed reviews throughout the company's short life. Stephen Satchell of InfoWorld found that the Turbo 386 failed to double the performance of ATs with 6 MHz 286 processors, as claimed by the company, instead only increasing performance by 83 percent. He felt that this was the product's biggest downfall, because 6 MHz ATs had the slowest clock speeds of the AT class, and thus users with these computers would have been the perfect market for the Turbo. Satchell contrasted the Turbo with Intel's Inboard, which increased performance of 6 MHz ATs by 250 percent, surmounting even the Turbo's boost on 8 MHz machines. Howard Marks of PC Magazine found the increased performance adequate on his AT but panned the lack of memory beyond the 1 MB used for cache; access to memory on the computer's motherboard above 1 MB would be bottlenecked by the AT's 16-bit data bus, negating the processing speed of the 386. Satchell praised the company's Abovefunction as a bargain, on the other hand.

The poor quality of the documentation provided with the company's products was a source of frequent criticism. Of the Turbo 386, Satchell wrote that its manual was "lacking in several key areas. Both the wording and the diagrams are unclear, and a user could easily damage the system board by removing the 286 chip as directed in the manual". Marks found an error in the same manual: a jumper on the board was factory-set to "slow mode" as stated in the manual, underclocking the 386 to be later configured for "fast mode" in a program provided with the Turbo 386. However Marks discovered that the Turbo 386 only worked on his PC AT with jumper configured for "fast mode"—the AT displayed nothing when he first turned it on with the Turbo 386 configured to "slow mode", leading him to believe that he had destroyed his computer. When the company released a mouse in 1987, Christopher Barr of PC Magazine found that it only worked with Mouse Systems drivers not included with the mouse, a trait not mentioned in its manual.

AC&P expected to file its initial public offering in 1987. This was cancelled, however, the company remaining private for the rest of its existence. It declared Chapter 7 bankruptcy on December 8, 1989, just four years after its incorporation. It reported debts of $1.3 million, on assets of $110 thousand. It was suspended from the Franchise Tax Board of California in February 1990.
