= V3 =

V3 or V03 may refer to:

== Medicine ==
- Mandibular nerve (V_{3}), division of the trigeminal nerve
- ATC code V03, a subgroup of the Anatomical Therapeutic Chemical Classification System
- Area V3 of the visual cortex
- V_{3}, one of six precordial leads in electrocardiography

== Technology ==
- V3 Gaming PC, an American manufacturer of custom-built personal computers
- V3 engine, a combustion engine configuration
- Flap retraction speed (V_{3}) in aviation, see V speeds
- Motorola RAZR V3, a series of mobile phones
- V3 Supercharger, third generation 250 kW battery charger for Tesla electric cars
- Z3 (computer), where it is previously known as V3
- Brilliance V3, a Chinese SUV
- V-3 cannon, German WWII super-cannon

== Other ==
- V-3 cannon, a large-calibre German World War II gun
- LNER Class V3, a class of British steam locomotives
- Belize's International Telecommunication Union callsign prefix
- Carpatair's IATA code
- Past participle form (V_{3}) of an English verb
- V3, or v3.co.uk, a British technology news website published by Incisive Media
- V3 (music group), an urban contemporary gospel group from the United States
- Danganronpa V3: Killing Harmony, a 2017 adventure visual novel video game
- Kamen Rider V3, a Japanese tokusatsu television series that aired from 1973 to 1974

== See also ==
- 3V (disambiguation)
