= LanSlide Gaming PCs =

LanSlide Gaming PCs, LLC
- Company type: Privately Owned
- Industry: Computer hardware
- Founded: 2005
- Defunct: c. 2011
- Fate: Dissolution
- Headquarters: Schenectady, New York
- Products: Desktops; Peripherals
- Website: http://www.lanslidepcs.com

LanSlide Gaming PCs was a privately owned, internet-based, gaming computer company located in Schenectady, New York. Specializing in high end portable gaming desktops, all of the company's computers were based around portable designs and marketed towards LAN party enthusiasts.

== History ==
LanSlide Gaming PCs, LLC was founded in 2005 by a group of gamers tired of moving large gaming desktops to LAN parties. The company focused on computers designed to be portable and sells a wide range of desktop gaming computers, all of which are built into cases with carrying handles for ease of transport. Each computer came with a special backpack to hold everything needed to run a desktop computer with the exception of the computer case. In addition to portable computers, LanSlide Gaming PCs also sold a line of computers designed for 3D gaming.

== Products ==
Small Form Factor Computers:

- Earthquake - Entry level gaming desktop
- Avalanche - Mid-range gaming desktop
- Armageddon - High-end gaming desktop

Mid-Tower Computers:

- Monsoon - Entry level gaming desktop
- Cyclone - Mid-range gaming desktop
- Hurricane - High-end gaming desktop

3D Gaming Computers:

- Sandstorm - Mid-range 3D gaming system
- Whirlwind - High-end 3D gaming system

== Free, Public Computer Support Service ==
In August, 2010 LaSlide Gaming PCs launched the "Absolutely Free Computer Help Page", which provided free computer support to the general public, regardless of their status as a customer of the company. The service allowed users to submit gaming computer related questions and get answers from live people within approximately 48 hours. While the service was focused on questions about building, buying, and fixing gaming computers, it was completely open-ended, allowing users to ask any computer related question and get an answer.

== PC Pack ==
LaSlide Gaming PCs holds patent pending status on a special backpack intended to make it easier to move a gaming set-up in one trip and avoid dropping or damaging desktop components during transit. The backpack is designed to hold and protect up to a 22″ widescreen monitor, extra-long gaming keyboard, mouse, headphones, surge protector, cables, and other miscellaneous paraphernalia need to run a desktop computer.

== Noteworthy Public Appearances ==
- PaxEast 2010: Mitchell Shuster, one of the founders of the company, appeared on a panel called "The Future of PC Gaming" at the first annual PAX-East convention, alongside John Abercrombie, lead programmer of Irrational Games and Joe Kreiner of Terminal Reality, where he spoke on the future prospects of the gaming PC industry.

== See also ==
- List of Computer System Manufacturers
