= V3 Gaming PC =

Personal computer manufacturer

- Company type: Privately held
- Founded: 2010; 16 years ago
- Defunct: 2016; 10 years ago
- Fate: Dissolution
- Headquarters: Lomita, California
- Products: 3D gaming computers
- Parent: Morphosis Inc.
- Website: www.v3gamingpc.com

Morphosis Inc., doing business as V3 Gaming PC was a manufacturer of custom-built personal computers headquartered in Lomita, California. The company, founded in 2010 by industry veterans, touted compatibility with 3D gaming technologies such as Nvidia 3D Vision as a selling point for its products. V3 Gaming PC computers were specifically designed for the gaming and enthusiast markets, and offered different levels of performance for different usage environments and price segments. V3 offered several different models of desktop computers ranging from full-tower systems to small form factor mini-PCs, all of which are liquid-cooled. The company also had a range of laptop computers with high-end gaming hardware and full HD displays.

In line with their 3D gaming persuasion, V3 was a launch partner for Nvidia 3D Vision Technology under the 3D PC initiative.

Morphosis, Inc. dissolved in 2016.

== Media coverage ==
V3 Gaming PC products garnered favorable reviews from various print and online technology publications, including PC World, Legit Reviews, CPU Magazine, and PC Magazine. A review of the V3 Gaming PC Avenger desktop computer earned the prestigious TweakTown Must Have: Best Features Award, citing value-adding tweaks like a significant processor overclock and RAID 0 as justification.

In February 2011, the V3 Convoy system reviewed at PC World was ranked in second place on the Top 10 Performance Desktop PCs list behind a $6399 computer from Origin PC. Given the similar performance of the V3 Convoy at $2499, it represents far greater value for money.

== See also ==
- List of computer system manufacturers
