= 3V =

3V or 3-V may refer to:

- TNT Airways S.A.'s IATA code
- 3V, a model of Toyota V engine
- SSH 3V (WA); se Washington State Route 241
- S281-3V, a model of Saleen S281
- 3V (V-70), manufacturer's designation for Venera 7
- 3V (V-72), manufacturer's designation for Venera 8

== See also ==
- V3 (disambiguation)
