= Corvus Systems =

Defunct computer technology company

- Type: Public
- Industry: Computers
- Founded: 1979; 47 years ago in San Jose, California
- Founder: Michael D'Addio; Mark Hahn
- Defunct: 1987
- Fate: Bankruptcy

Corvus Systems was a computer technology company that offered, at various points in its history, computer hardware, software, and complete PC systems.

== History ==
Corvus was founded by Michael D'Addio and Mark Hahn in 1979. This San Jose, Silicon Valley company pioneered in the early days of personal computers, producing the first hard disk drives, data backup, and networking devices, commonly for the Apple II. The combination of disk storage, backup, and networking was very popular in primary and secondary education. A classroom would have a single drive and backup with a full classroom of Apple II computers networked together. Students would log in each time they use the computer and access their work via the Corvus Omninet network, which also supported eMail.

They went public in 1981 and were traded on the NASDAQ exchange. In 1985 Corvus acquired a company named Onyx & IMI. IMI (International Memories Incorporated) manufactured the hard disks used by Corvus.

The New York Times followed its financial fortunes. It was a modest success in the stock market during its first few years as a public company. The company's founders left Corvus in 1985 as the remaining board of directors made the decision to enter the PC clone market. D'Addio and Hahn went on to found Videonics in 1986, the same year Corvus discontinued hardware manufacturing.

In 1987, Corvus filed for Chapter 11. That same year two top executives left. Its demise was partially caused by Ethernet establishing itself over Omninet as the local area network standard for PCs, and partially by the decision to become a PC clone company in a crowded and unprofitable market space.

== Disk drives and backup ==
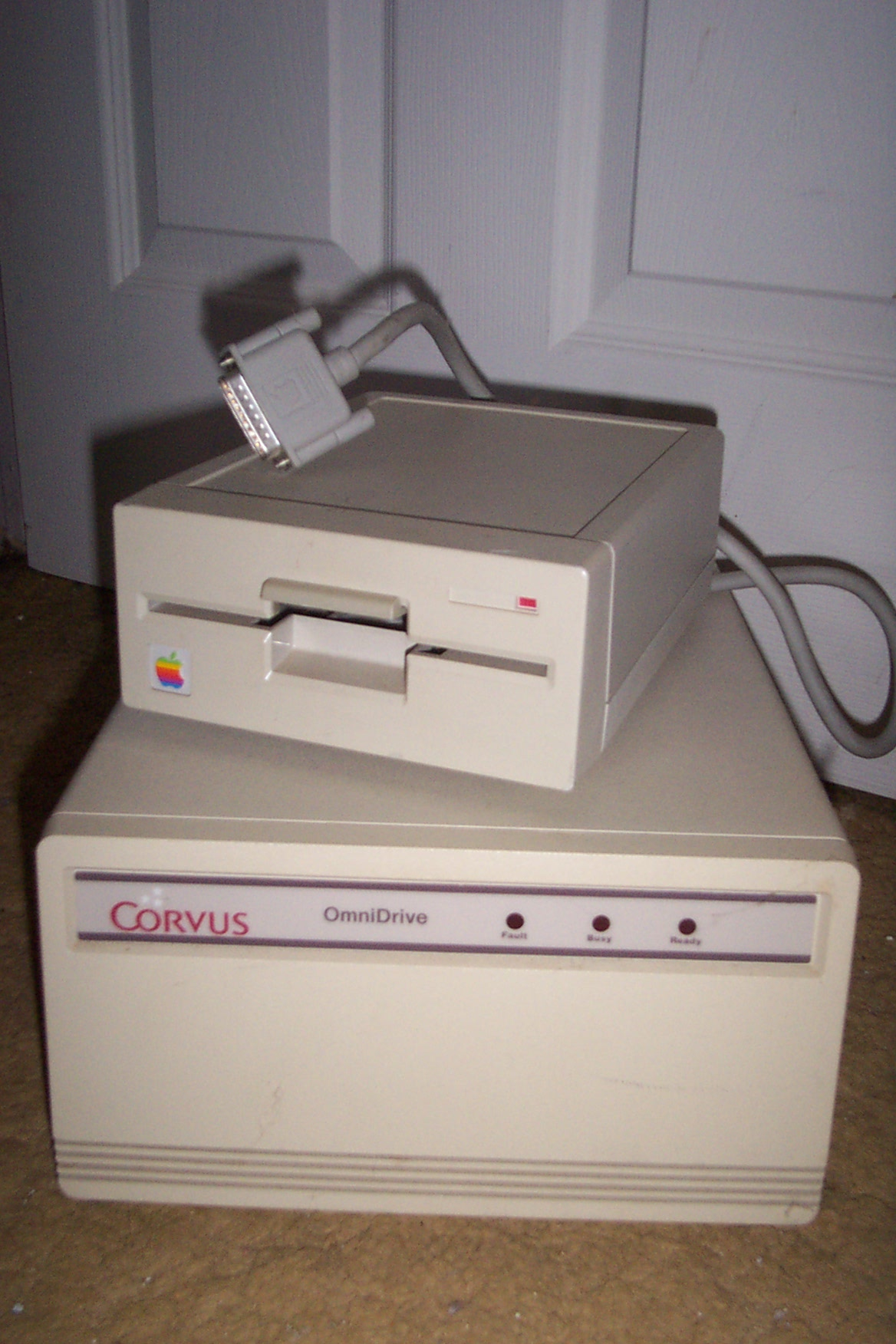
Corvus Omnidrive pictured under an Apple 5.25" Disk II floppy disk drive

The company modified Apple DOS for the Apple II to enable using Corvus's 10 MB Winchester technology hard disk drives. Apple DOS normally was limited to the usage of 140 KB floppy disks. The Corvus disks not only increased the size of available storage but were also considerably faster than floppy disks. These disk drives were initially sold to software engineers inside Apple Computer.

The disk drives were manufactured by IMI (International Memories Incorporated) in Cupertino, California. Corvus provided the hardware and software to interface them to the Apple II, TRS-80, Atari 8-bit computers, and S-100 bus systems. Later, the DEC Rainbow, Corvus Concept, IBM PC, Mac, and Sony SMC-70 were added to the list. These 5 MB and 10 MB drives were twice the size of a shoebox and initially retailed for US$5000. Corvus sold many stand-alone drives whose numbers increased as they became shared over Omninet. This allowed sharing a then-very costly hard drive among multiple, relatively inexpensive Apple II computers. An entire office or classroom could thus share a single Omninet-connected Corvus drive.

Certain models of the drives offered a tape backup option called "Mirror" to make hard disk backups using a VCR, which was itself a relatively new technology. A standalone version of "Mirror" was also made available. Data was backed up at roughly one megabyte per minute which resulted in five or ten-minute backup times. Tapes could hold up to 73MB. Even though Corvus had a U.S. patent 4380047A on this technology, several other computer companies later used this technique.

A later version of tape backup for the Corvus Omninet was called The Bank. and was a standalone Omninet connected device that used custom backup tape media that were very similar in shape and size to today's DLT tapes. Both the Corvus File Server and The Bank tape backup units were in white plastic housings roughly the size of two stacked reams of paper.

== Networking ==
In 1980, Corvus came out with the first commercially successful local area network (LAN), called Omninet. Most Ethernet deployments of the time ran at 3 Mbit/s and cost one or two thousand dollars per computer. Ethernet also used a thick and heavy cable that felt like a lead pipe when bent, which was run in proximity to each computer, often in the ceiling plenum. The weight of the cable was such that injury to workers from ceiling failure and falling cables was a real danger. A transceiver unit was spliced or tapped into the cable for each computer, with an additional AUI cable running from the transceiver to the computer itself.

Corvus's Omninet ran at one megabit per second, used twisted pair cables and had a simple add-in card for each computer. The card cost $400 and could be installed by the end user. Cards and operating software were produced for both the Apple II and the IBM PC and XT. At the time, many networking experts said that twisted pair could never work because "the bits would leak off", but it eventually became the de-facto standard for wired LANs.

Other Omninet devices included the "Utility Server" that was an Omninet connected device that allowed one Parallel printer and two Serial devices (usually printers) connected to it to be shared on an Omninet network. Internally the Utility Server was a single-board Z80 computer with 64 kB of RAM, and on startup the internal boot ROM retrieved its operating program from the File Server. The literature/documentation and software that shipped with the Utility Server included a memory map and I/O ports writeup. It was possible to replace the Utility Server's operating code file with a stand-alone copy of WordStar configured for the serial port, and to fetch and save its files on the file server. A dumb terminal connected to the first serial port then became an inexpensive diskless word processing station.

A single Omninet was limited to 64 devices, and each device's address was set with six DIP switches. Device zero was the first file server, device one was the Mirror or The Bank tape backup, the rest were user computers, or Utility Servers. Systems with more than one file server had them at zero and up, then the tape backup, then the user computers. No matter what the configuration, one could only have 64 devices.

== Corvus Concept ==
In April 1982, Corvus launched a computer called the Corvus Concept. This was a Motorola 68000-based computer in a pizza-box case with a 15" full page display mounted on its top, the first that could be rotated between landscape and portrait modes. Changing display orientation did not require rebooting the computer - it was all automatic and seamless and selected by a mercury switch inside the monitor shell. The screen resolution was 720×560 pixels. Positioned vertically, the monitor displayed 72 rows by 91 columns of text; the horizontal resolution was 56 rows by 120 columns.

The first version of the Concept came with 256 KB standard, and expanding the RAM to its maximum supported capacity of 1 MB cost $995 at the time. The Concept was capable of using more RAM, and a simple hack provided up to 4 MB. The failure of the Concept was mostly related to its lack of compatibility with the IBM PC, introduced the previous August.

The Concept interface, though not a GUI, was a standardized text user interface that made heavy use of function keys. Application programs could contextually redefine these keys, and the current command performed by each key was displayed on a persistent status line at the bottom of the screen. The function keys were placed on the top row of the keyboard close to their onscreen representation. A crude "Paint" program was available for $395 that permitted a user to create simple bitmap graphics. These could be pasted into Corvus' word processing program called "Edword", which was quite powerful by the standards of the day; it was judged to be worth the cost of the system by itself.

The operating system, called CCOS, was prompt-driven, communicating with the user using full sentences such as Copy which file(s)? when the "Copy file" function key was pressed. The user would respond by typing the path of the file to be copied. The OS would then prompt for a destination path. Wildcard pattern matching was supported using the * and ? characters. The OS supported pipes and "Exec files", which were similar to shell scripts.

Versions of the Concept running Unix were available; these configurations could not run standard Concept software. The UCSD p-System was available, and a Pascal compiler was available supporting most UCSD extensions FORTRAN was also standard. Built-in BASIC was also an option, enabling the computer to boot without a disk attached. A software CP/M emulator was available from Corvus, but it was of limited usefulness since it only emulated Intel 8080 instructions and not the more-common Z80-specific instructions. Wesleyan University ported the KERMIT file transfer protocol.

The entire motherboard could slide out of the back of the cabinet for easy access to perform upgrades and repairs. The system was equipped with four 50-pin Apple II bus-compatible slots for expansion cards. External 5.25" and 8" floppy disk drive peripherals (made by Fujitsu) were available for the Concept. The 8" drive had a formatted capacity of 250 kB. The 5.25" drive was read-only, and disks held 140 kB. The video card was integrated in the monitor's update circuitry. The system had a battery-backed hardware clock that stored the date and month, but not the year. There was a leap year switch that set February to have 29 days.

The system had a built in Omninet port on it. The system could boot from a locally-connected floppy disk or Corvus Hard Drive or it could be booted over the Omninet network.

In 1984, the base 256 KB system cost US$3,995 (equivalent to $12,400 in 2025) with monitor, keyboard and bundled Edword word processor. The floppy drive cost an additional $750. Hard drives from 6 MB ($2,195) to 20 MB ($3,995) were also available (SCSI I on some). A software bundle containing ISYS integrated spreadsheet, graphing, word processing, and communication software cost $495. The hardware necessary for networking cost $495 per workstation. The Concept Unix workstation came with 512 KB and cost $4,295 for the Concept Uniplex that can be expanded to two users and $5,995 for the Concept Plus that can service eight users. The Concept was available as part of turnkey systems from OEMs, such as the Oklahoma Seismic Corporation Mira for oil well exploration, and the KeyText Systems BookWare for publishing.
