= Intel Inboard 386 =

The Intel Inboard 386 was a family of ISA expansion cards released by Intel starting in 1987. The family comprised the Intel Inboard 386/AT and Intel Inboard 386/PC, which allowed users to upgrade an IBM AT or an IBM PC (or compatible) respectively. The boards allowed users to upgrade their machines' CPU to a 16 MHz 80386 processor. Both variants utilized a ribbon cable which plugged into the computer's original CPU socket on one end and into a socket on the Inboard card on the other end.

Both boards were full-length ISA expansion cards and occupied one slot. Each card came with 1 MB of onboard memory as standard, included an 80386 processor, and included a socket for an 80387 math coprocessor. Originally, the Intel Board 386/AT offered board without memory and 1 MB of memory for US$1,995 and US$2,495 respectfully. Later into the lifespan of the Inboard, Intel began offering 2 MB and 4 MB memory expansion daughter cards. Initially, the Intel Inboard 386/AT have available 1 MB piggyback memory board for US$645 and 2 MB piggyback memory board for US$1,145. The available Intel Inboard 386/AT has the optional module of 10-MHz 80287 Mathematics Coprocessor for US$495. The Intel Inboard 386/PC comes with 1 MB of 32-bit memory which it has no switches and jumpers. This version was available for US$995. Daughter boards designed for use in the Intel Inboard 386/PC were incompatible with the Intel Inboard 386/AT and vice versa. The Inboard 386/PC were expandable up to 5 MB with the combination of onboard memory and with optional piggyback memory board.

Both boards utilized DOS drivers to configure the onboard memory. Without these drivers, the boards would still function, but the onboard memory could only be used as conventional, and not as extended or expanded. The Intel Inboard DOS drivers could also be configured to "slow down" system performance by adding memory wait states, thus alleviating compatibility issues.

== Disadvantages ==
Some of the disadvantages of the product were:

1. Though the 80386 was a 32-bit CPU, it was limited to a 16-bit I/O bus in the case of the Intel Inboard 386/AT and an 8-bit I/O bus in the case of the Intel Inboard 386/PC. Both boards retained 32-bit data and address buses, however.
2. Although computers upgraded with the Intel Inboard 386 featured 16 MHz 80386 processors, they still tended to be inferior to most 386-class machines, as they still sported their original (by then obsolete) motherboard bus circuitry (e.g. DMA, ISA bus, etc.)

== Advantages ==
The Intel Inboards allowed users to run 386-dependent software which would not normally run on an XT or AT class machine. Examples of such programs include: Ventura 2.0 Desktop Publishing Software (with Hercules monochrome graphics), AutoCAD 386, Windows 3.1 (Inboard 386/AT model only). The Intel Inboard 386/PC was also the only upgrade solution which allowed owners of XT-class machines to utilize extended memory without replacing the motherboard.
