= CMS Computers =

- Industry: Computer manufacturer
- Founded: Warrington, UK (1993)
- Founder: Ian Fraser and Sion Roberts
- Fate: Acquired by VIP Group (2011)
- Headquarters: Warrington, UK
- Products: Laptops, desktops and tablets
- Website: www.cms-computers.co.uk

CMS Computers was a manufacturer of desktop, laptop and tablet computers based in Warrington, UK. It primarily traded under the brand Zoostorm. The company was founded in 1993, and was acquired by VIP Group in 2011.

Logo for the Zoostorm brand

In a 2009 press release, CMS Computers cited Microsoft figures placing the company as the fifth largest manufacturer of desktop computers, laptops and servers in the UK, and the third largest manufacturer of Intel-based systems.

In November 2011, PC components distributor VIP Computer Centre acquired CMS Computers for an undisclosed amount. At the time, CMS generated more than £30 million in annual sales and operated the Zoostorm and FizzBook brands. CMS initially continued operating independently under co-founders Ian Fraser and Sion Roberts; however they left the company in 2017 and established a new PC manufacturing company.
