= Quasar Data Products =

American computer company

QDP Computer Systems Inc.
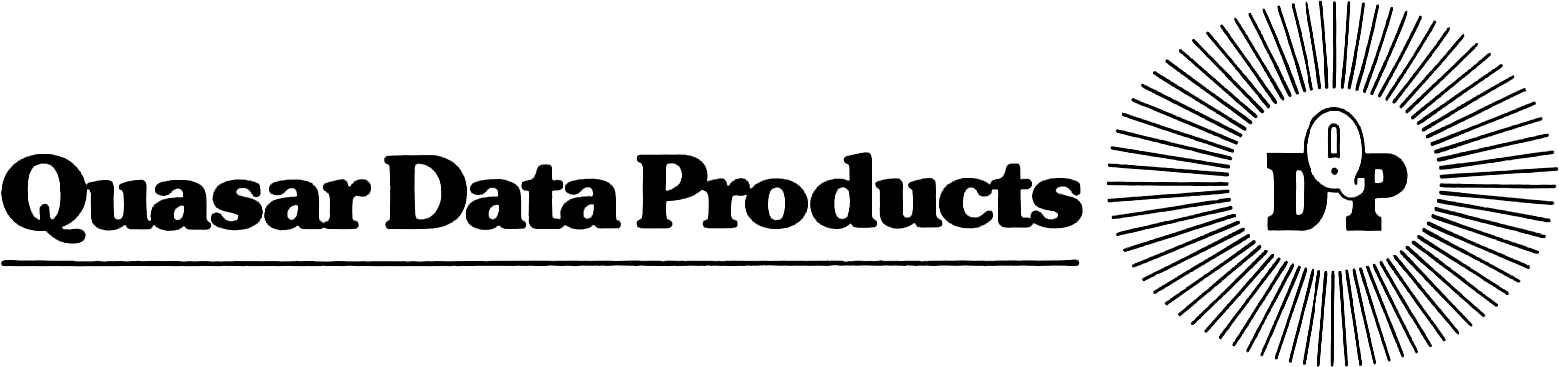
- Formerly: Quasar Data Products Inc. (1978–1983)
- Industry: Computers
- Founded: 1979; 47 years ago in North Olmsted, Ohio, United States
- Founders: Brian A. Catalucci; Dave L. Kelley
- Defunct: 1989; 37 years ago
- Fate: Dissolved
- Number of employees: 16 (1983)

Quasar Data Products Inc. (QDP), later QDP Computer Systems Inc., was an American computer company based in 1979 in North Olmsted, Ohio, United States. The company was founded by Brian A. Catalucci and Dave L. Kelley, the former a trained engineer who had previously worked as an airline pilot.

From the late 1970s to the mid-1980s, Quasar sold various after-market expansions for S-100-based computers. They also sold their own line of computers, called the QDP series, beginning in 1980. These QDP computers were popular among the U.S. Navy for their reliability, and Quasar tapped into this military demand by making further entries in the series field-hardened. The company pivoted to manufacturing high-spec graphics cards for the IBM PC before going defunct in 1989.

== Foundation (1979–1982) ==
Quasar Data Products was founded in North Olmsted, Ohio, a suburb of Cleveland, in 1979 by a group of Kent State University graduates. The company's principal founders were Brian A. Catalucci and Dave L. Kelley. Prior to founding the company, Catalucci was a pilot for United Airlines and had graduated from KSU with a degree in aeronautical engineering.

The company's first product, introduced in 1979, was the QDP-100. It was a Z80-based CP/M desktop computer with a 4-MHz-clocked microprocessor and 64 KB of RAM stock. The computer was based on the S-100 bus introduced with the Altair 8800 and comes shipped with a floppy card that controls two 8-inch floppy disk drives. A monochrome dumb terminal was included in order to interface with the computer; it connected via one of the two serial ports (the computer also has two parallel peripheral ports). The QDP-100 also shipped with a PROM programmer. It retailed in 1980 for $4,795. The QDP-100 proved quite popular with the U.S. Navy for its reliability, with four system units aboard the USS Lexington in 1983 and one unit aboard the USS Stump, among others. While Quasar intended the computer as a general-purpose personal computer, the computer's popularity among the Navy gave the company the incentive to ruggedize further units. For example, the computer's power supplies were built from premium components, including heavy-duty line-filter capacitors, and were built to be shock- and temperature-resistant.

Later in 1980, Quasar introduced the QDP-8100, another CP/M desktop computer, this time based on the 16-bit Zilog Z8000 microprocessor. It featured similar specifications to the QDP-100, including an equivalent clock speed, amount of RAM, and floppy drives, but came shipped with an intelligent terminal. The QDP-8100 was backwards-compatible with Z80-based applications via software emulator. Quasar sold the QDP-8100 for $6,395.

== Name change (1982–1984) ==
Between 1980 and 1982, the company changed its name to QDP Computer Systems. In November 1982, the company released the QDP-200, described as a streamlined version of the QDP-100 that featured slimline 8-inch floppy drives, in either dual or single configurations, and an improved version of the Z80 processor known as the Z80A. Like its predecessor, it featured 64 KB of RAM stock.

In December 1982, Quasar began producing the QDP-300, an explicitly ruggedized machine that featured a built-in thermistor in the system unit which sounded an alarm if the temperature inside the main chassis was potentially overheating the computer. The computer ran off the Z80A-DMA, a version of the Z80A microprocessor with support for a direct memory access controller, allowing for high-speed data transfer to any peripherals attached to the bus while freeing up the microprocessor to accomplish other tasks in the background. The QDP-300 came with 128 KB of RAM stock, expandable up to 256 KB. Additional memory acts to cache data written to and read from the disk; the cache memory also read-ahead/read-behind. Like its predecessors, the QDP-300 came with two 8-inch floppy drives by default, although the user could have purchased it with a 5.25-inch hard disk drive adapted to fit inside the unit.

Quasar Data Products brought in $1 million in revenue in 1983 and expected to triple that figure in the following year. QDP was one of the few technology companies in northern Ohio—largely the domain of automotive manufacturing and steelmaking—to specialize in the field of computers. This circumstance was both a source of pride and frustration for the company's owners, who had difficulty raising capital to expand the company. According to Catalucci, this was due to local investors largely being reluctant to fund to high-tech companies out of ignorance and apathy for such products. In 1983, Catalucci planned on opening a demonstration center for the company's products and capitalizing on a contemporary initiative by then Ohio governor Dick Celeste to promote consumer goods made in Ohio.

Over the summer of 1984, the company announced the final two entries in the QDP series, the QDP-400 and QPD-500. The QDP-400 was meant for multi-user environments, shipped stock with a copy of TurboDOS, while the QPD-500 could be used as either a single-user or multi-user machine (as stock, the QDP-500 came with CP/M, but optioned was MP/M). The QDP-400 was a multiprocessor machine, featuring a Z80B clocked at 6 MHz for the primary processor and a Z80A at the same clock speed for each of the five co-processors sockets; the computer came with two such Z80As by default. The primary processor and each co-processor were located on their own expansion boards that plugged into one of the six double-height S-100 bus slots. The aforementioned processor cards also contained RAM chips 128 KB in total size. Each workstation terminal that interfaced with the QDP-400 was allocated a full 128 KB, and for a multi-user session this necessitated a card for each user. The QDP-400 came with a 55 MB hard drive and one 1.2 MB 8-inch floppy drive that accepted hard-sectored disks. The QDP-400 came with two Centronics-style parallel ports and 12 serial ports.

The QDP-500, by contrast, was a much simpler machine, featuring only one Z80A processor clocked at 4 MHz, 128 KB of RAM stock, and one 5.25-inch disk drive. With MP/M, four terminals could access the QDP-500 simultaneously.

== Pivot and dissolution (1984–1989) ==
Between 1984 and 1986, the company moved out from its 10330 Brecksville Road suite to new headquarters at 23632 Merchantile Road and made the business pivot from S-100 based microcomputer products to high-specification ISA-based graphics cards, meant for CAD applications on the IBM PC and its clones. They received mixed, mostly positive, reviews in PC Magazine. Quasar Data Products eventually went out of business in 1989.
