= Zeda Computers =

Defunct American computer company

Zeda Computers International Limited
- Type: Private
- Industry: Computer
- Founded: 1974; 52 years ago in Provo, Utah
- Founder: John McMullen
- Fate: Dissolution
- Headquarters: Provo, Utah; Nottingham, Nottinghamshire, England, Auckland NZ,

Zeda Computers International Limited, trading as Zeda Computer Systems, was an American computer company based in Provo, Utah, and with overseas office in Nottingham and Auckland NZ. Founded in 1974, their best-selling computer was the Zeda 580, a Zilog Z80-based all-in-one microcomputer.

== Corporate history ==
Zeda Computers International was founded in 1974 by John McMullen. Beginning life as a electronics research and development laboratory, with few years later the company expanded to full-time production and marketing of computer systems and electronic word processors from within its 7,000-square-foot headquarters. Expansion was hastened after the company earned a contract to design a computer terminal and a data buffer system for a computer peripheral manufacturer out of San Jose, California, in the mid-1970s. In 1976, the company established an overseas sales office in Nottingham, and in 1980 established a subsidiary in Auckland New Zealand. Raj Sharma, based in Auckland, was appointed as the Regional Manager -South Pacific.

After Zeda released its first microcomputers in late 1977, the company's revenues soon rose to US$1.5 million. The company's Z80-based all-in-one, the Zeda 580, sold especially well and prompted Zeda's expansion into a 1,500-square-foot building adjacent to its Provo headquarters to where they moved their marketing department. They released a companion dumb terminal, the Zeda 550, in December 1979, allowing two users to operate the computer at once with the computer's special operating system, InfiNet.

Zeda had by 1980 dealer networks in the Western United States, England, Australia, New Zealand and the South Pacific. That year's summer, the company earned two additional contracts from dealers in Portland, Oregon, and Rantoul, Illinois, to distribute $5.7 million worth of Zeda's 580 systems. The computer topped $1 million in domestic sales in August 1981; in the United Kingdom, the company topped £1 million in sales turnover in 1984. Its Brighton sales office staffed 40 that year. The branch was commissioned by the Peterborough Building Society to transform the bank's Westgate branch into having a computerized open office floor plan.

== Products ==
- Zeda Computer System
- Zeda-80
- Zeda 520
- Zeda 550
- Zeda 580
- ZeDoS - operating system, as superset of CP/M
- Lexicon - A fully customisable Word-processing software designed for typesetting
- InfiNet- Local area networking on RS232C- at 19.2Kb/s speeds prior to invention of Ethernet. Used to share drives and printers across a LAN with file locking built into the ZeDoS
