= Acemagic =

Computer company

ACEMAGIC
- Company type: Private
- Industry: Consumer electronics
- Founded: 2013
- Headquarters: Shenzhen, China
- Area served: Worldwide
- Products: Mini PCs, laptops, small form factor systems
- Website: acemagic.com

ACEMAGIC (also stylized as AceMagic or AceMagician) is a Chinese manufacturer of compact desktop computers and laptops.

== Background ==
ACEMAGIC was established in 2013 in Shenzhen, China. It began as a small assembler of personal computers before moving into the design of mini PCs and compact laptops. By the late 2010s, the company began exporting through online marketplaces and third-party distributors.

== Operations ==
Production and design take place in Shenzhen, with distribution managed through Hong Kong-based channels. ACEMAGIC products are sold through global e-commerce platforms including Amazon and AliExpress. The company has exhibited at technology trade shows such as Computex Taipei, where it showcased prototypes including the dual-screen X1 laptop.

ACEMAGIC uses components from Intel and AMD for many devices. Following Intel's discontinuation of its NUC mini PC brand, ACEMAGIC was among several manufacturers producing compact desktop alternatives.

== Research and development ==
The company develops compact system architectures and cooling solutions for small enclosures. It has introduced concept designs including sci-fi–inspired mini PCs and the horizontally folding dual-screen X1 laptop.

== Products ==
The company has released several compact systems, including the S1 (2023), the Tank 03 (2024), the F2A with Intel Core Ultra processors (2024), the X1 (2024), and the F3A featuring AMD Ryzen AI 9 HX 370 chips (2025).

== Controversy ==
In early 2024, ACEMAGIC was reported to have shipped certain mini PCs containing pre-installed malware. The company stated that the issue was limited to early shipments and later announced measures to improve software verification processes.

== Reception ==
NotebookCheck has noted steady hardware improvements in its mini PC range, while TechRadar and Ars Technica described mixed performance and build quality compared with established brands. The company remains part of the expanding global market for compact and low-power personal computers.
