= Micromation =

Micromation Inc. was as an early pioneer (1978–1983) in the design, manufacture and sale of microcomputer systems, circuit boards and peripherals. The company's products were built around early Intel and Zilog microprocessors, the S-100 bus and the CP/M and MP/M operating system software from Digital Research. Micromation's headquarters and manufacturing plant were both located in San Francisco.

Unlike other computer companies of the same era, Micromation's products were targeted primarily at business users rather than hobbyists or consumers. The systems could be used to run a wide variety of software applications including the popular WordStar word processing program from Micropro and many other programs available for the CP/M and MP/M operating systems.

The company built some of the first multi-user computer systems based on microprocessor technology and supported as many as 16 CRT terminals for users. A unique feature of Micromation systems was that they were also "multi-processor", meaning that a single system could contain as many as 16 separate CPUs, one for each user. This allowed the system to support multiple users without sacrificing performance. Most other multi-user systems of the day used a single CPU to run applications for multiple users which resulted in lower performance.

Micromation built and sold thousands of computer systems in the U.S., Canada, Europe, South America and Australia before going out of business in 1985. Like most of the early microcomputer companies, Micromation was not able to adapt to the changing marketplace following the introduction of the IBM PC in 1981.

== History ==
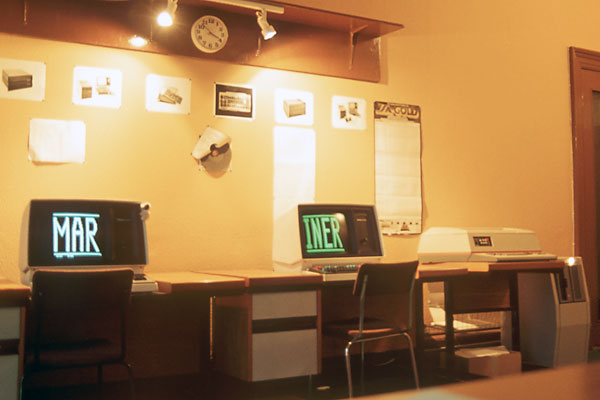
Micromation Mariner

Micromation was founded in 1977 by Ben Cooper, an electronic engineer and former officer in the U.S. Navy. The company's headquarters were located in downtown San Francisco and manufacturing was located in the South of Market area of the city.

Micromation's first major product was an S-100 bus floppy disk controller card called the "Doubler", named for its ability to record information on 8" floppy diskettes at twice the bit density previously available. This was accomplished by writing 256 byte sectors using MFM encoding, instead of the standard 128 byte sectors with FM encoding. This allowed users to store approximately 500 kilobytes of data on each side of an 8" diskette instead of 243 kilobytes.

While the Doubler board was successful with hobbyists building and supporting their own S-100 computers, Micromation began to focus on building complete S-100 computer systems. The first full system was called the Z-Plus or Z-System, and affectionately become known as "The Coffin Computer" due its finished wooden sides and elongated shape. Though the case itself was designed to fit into a standard 19" rack, this format was unpopular with smaller businesses, leading to the units being clad in wood and retro-fitted into customised wooden desks.

Micromation was an early OEM supplier to Zendex Corporation of a single board implementation of the Intel SBC-202 Double Density MMFM Floppy Disk Controller in 1980. This disk controller was the only Multibus-I product made by Micromation. Zendex wholesaled hundreds of the Micromation boards in the Zendex Development Systems and wrote a user's manual and added quality assurance and customer support for retail customers under the Zendex model number ZX-200. Zendex later reverse engineered the product and began second sourcing itself just as Micromation discontinued the product to focus on S-100 systems.

The M/System, Mariner and MiSystem models followed, all of which were multi-user, multi-processor business computers which ran a Micromation-modified version of Digital Research's MP/M operating system.
