= Tava Corporation =

American computer company

- Industry: Computers; Retail
- Founded: March 1983; 43 years ago in Irvine, California
- Founders: Perry Lamba; Earl Perera
- Defunct: October 1984; 42 years ago
- Fate: Acquired by Replitech Inc.
- Products: Computers
- Divisions: CompuShack

Tava Corporation was an American computer company that was active from 1983 to 1984 and based in Irvine, California. It was an early manufacturer of IBM PC compatibles. It also operated the CompuShack chain of franchised computer retail stores across the United States.

== History ==
Tava Corporation was incorporated and headquartered in Irvine, California, by Perry Lamba and Earl Perera in March 1983. The company's first product was a coin-operated personal computer that was a clone of the Apple II with a coin acceptor that allowed purchasers to buy computer usage time. Introduced in April 1983, this coin-op Apple II clone was aimed at the general public but especially public libraries, secondary schools, and colleges to allow children to learn how to use a real personal computer and for students to be able to perform academic research and compose essays, without having to purchase an entire Apple II, which at the time retailed for several thousands of dollars (US$). The coin-op nature meanwhile prevented any one person from monopolizing computer time and acted as a monetization scheme for both the libraries and Tava, each of which taking a percentage of the profits. Tava's coin-op computers were installed in libraries in Southern California, including Walnut Creek, Santa Ana, and San Diego. Each quarter-hour of computer time cost 50¢.

In mid-1983, Tava established CompuShack, a computer retailer. By December 1983, the company had opened 20 locations across the United States. In the same month, Tava began franchising existing and new locations. In around June 1983, Tava began developing their first entries into the IBM PC compatible market, hiring Gene Lu to help engineer these products and Faraday Electronics to manufacture its motherboard. In October 1983, they were unveiled as the Tava PC, a desktop computer, and the Tava PC 1, a luggable portable. Like the original IBM PC, both of these Tava computers featured Intel 8088 microprocessors; the PC retailed as a barebones system, with just the desktop, for under US$1000, while the PC1 cost a little under $2000. Tava later raised the base price of the Tava PC to $1995 (~$3,845 in 2025) while doubling the amount of RAM and including a monochrome monitor and keyboard. In June 1984, Tava unveiled the Tava Turbo PC, which upgraded the microprocessor of its predecessors to the Intel 8088-2, clocked at 7.16 MHz. The company sold their computers through their CompuShack stores as well as through other retailers. According to Mini-Micro Systems, Tava were likely the first proprietor of a computer retailer to sell their own private label IBM PC clone.

Between April and August 1984, Tava sold roughly 2,500 of their PCs a month. The company experience a slowdown in sales that June after IBM instituted price cuts across their entire IBM PC range that month. Shipments of Tava PCs significantly dwindled in the months after the introduction of the Tava Turbo PC in late August 1984, while the company had been spending between $60,000 and $70,000 monthly on its advertising budget. In late October 1984, Tava Corporation was acquired by Replitech, a distributor of computers based in the East Coast, who planned on keeping the Tava label while producing a broader range of systems on the low end of the market.

In 1985, Replitech renamed themselves Tava USA Inc. and released a series of PC compatibles, from the low-end Megaplus, which featured a 4.77-MHz Intel 8088, dual 5.25-inch floppy disk drives, a monitor and keyboard, and 256 KB of RAM; to the Sprite, which featured a hard disk drive. Tava USA commissioned Advanced Logic Research, a company founded by Lu in Irvine, to manufacture the motherboards for both the Sprite and the Megaplus. Both computers were manufactured and assembled entirely in the United States while sold at prices rivaling those of the East Asian-built Turbo XTs starting to flood the market at the time.

== American Micro Technology ==
After selling Tava to Replitech, Lamba founded American Micro Technology (AMT), a mail-order supplier of IBM PC compatibles, in 1985 with former Tava sales representative Art Afshar. AMT's lineup included the AMTjr and the XT-plus, named after the IBM PCjr and IBM PC XT respectively.

In March 1987, IBM filed a lawsuit against AMT alleging trademark infringement with their aforementioned product lines, as well as claiming that AMT's use of the Chaplin Tramp motif in their print advertisements infringed IBM's creative direction for their own print advertisements for the PC.
