= Genisco Technology =

Genisco Technology Corporation
- Industry: Electronics
- Founded: 1983; 43 years ago in La Mirada, California, United States
- Defunct: 1997

Genisco Technology Corporation, also known as Solaris Genisco, is a maker of military computers and electronic filters and has been heavily involved with military contracts. Genisco incorporated in 1983 and is based in Anaheim, California.

Genisco's products were used primarily in the military and in factory automation. The company was based in La Mirada, California before moving to Anaheim.

Its transducer sub-division built the altimeters for the HARM missile, Space Shuttle cabin pressure transducers and liquid thruster fuel line pressure sensors, Mark 48 naval torpedoes, civilian airliner brake pad pressure sensors, and Idaho Nuclear Commission water valve switching sensors. In November 1988, the company pled guilty to falsifying test data on torpedo simulators, a mobile underwater target device, and HARM missile transducers. Genisco paid a $725,000 fine and three supervisors in the transducer division were sentenced to prison terms in January 1989.

The company filed for Chapter 11 bankruptcy in February 1995. Soon after, it announced that it had sold its filter division, Genisco Electronics, and its Eldema Indicator Lites indicator line, including a factory in Tijuana, Mexico, to Potter Production Corp. of Minneapolis, Minnesota. It retained its Solaris division, which produced "hardened" computer workstations for factory floors, in a licensing agreement with Sun Microsystems.
