= Exxon Enterprises =

Former Exxon fully owned affiliate

Exxon Enterprises was formed by Exxon Corporation in 1964, as a wholly owned affiliate, for the purpose of diversification - creating and investing in new businesses outside the petroleum and chemical industries. It was initially headed by Eugene ("Gene") McBrayer, President, and Hollister ("Ben") Sykes, Senior Vice President.

By 1978, Exxon's chairman, Clifton C. Garvin, had "... earmarked $1 Billion for non-oil related capital spending through 1980."

== Background ==
After several initial efforts in commercializing non-energy-related developments from Exxon's research laboratories failed to reach commercial success, in 1968 the focus was narrowed to ten business areas which appeared to hold potential for substantial growth. However, several of those areas failed to germinate, such as factory-built housing, artificial foods, and health and medical products. As a result, the focus was further narrowed, to companies which had the potential to reach $100 million in value, within three selected market areas: New Materials; Solar Energy; and Information Processing.

In 1969, venture capital investing was also undertaken. These investments were generally made to startup situations, and limited to $500,000 in the first year. These initial funds were most often used to expand the venture team, continue technical development, and undertake market research. Later, additional funding was used for prototype development and test marketing. More funding was provided once commercial viability was established. For more mature venture capital situations, 10% to 40% of the equity was acquired.

By 1976, Exxon had added two existing, fully owned companies to Exxon Enterprises: Gilbert & Barker Manufacturing, a $100 million long-term Exxon affiliate which made gas pumps and other equipment for gas stations; and Exxon Nuclear Company, which supplied nuclear fuel and other services for nuclear reactors. In addition, Exxon Enterprises had 26 other companies in various stages of development, 10 of which remained from projects started from within Exxon, and 16 of which were venture-capital-type investments in small, outside technology-based companies.

== Exxon Information Systems ==
In early 1979, Exxon Enterprises combined its startup Information Systems companies into an entity named Exxon Information Systems, with a goal of becoming a major supplier of advanced office systems and communications networks to the office systems market. Four of the formerly autonomous companies (Vydec, Qwip, Qyz, and Zilog) were grouped together in advertisements for the Office of the Future.

There were also changes in Exxon Enterprises' leadership. Exxon rotated Eugene McBrayer out of Exxon Enterprises to a vice president position at Exxon Chemical Co., and Robert Winslow, the former President of Exxon Chemical Co., was brought in to replace McBrayer as President of Exxon Enterprises. Winslow immediately began to manage more of the disparate companies' activities from Exxon's New York City headquarters. Additional experienced Office Systems management from IBM and Xerox, in particular, was also hired.

1980 was the peak year for Exxon Information Systems. Sales reached an estimated $200 million in that year, but losses continued, estimated at tens of millions of dollars. Although the Office Systems companies were the first in their markets with their original products, such as the Qyx typewriter, Vydec word processor, and Qwip low-priced fax transceiver, they were not able to produce and market updated versions in time, and the original products quickly became obsolete. As a result, EOS needed to reach out to outside companies to produce new generation word processors and ink-jet printers.

Although it was able to increase its sales of Qyx typewriters by selling through Sears, Roebuck & Co., other efforts at increasing sales through independent retail outlets proved to be insufficient. Consequently, the EOS companies were leapfrogged by competitors, including Xerox, IBM and Wang Laboratories.

In 1981, Exxon tried to stanch the losses and move into profitability. Qyx, Qwip and Vydec were consolidated into Exxon Office Systems (EOS), and reorganized into product lines, with joint marketing and manufacturing facilities. An initial layoff of 600 employees in early 1981, both from within the individual companies and at headquarters, was followed by the closing of a Qwip manufacturing plant and a subsequent layoff of another 1,100 workers later in the year, reducing the entire Exxon Enterprises workforce by about 20% to 4,000 total employees. Parts of the company developing and producing data storage systems were sold to Storage Technology Corp. (StorageTek). The losses continued, however, and the Office Systems Company never regained a prominent position in the overall Office Systems market.

== Closure of Exxon Enterprises and Exxon Office Systems ==
By 1984, Exxon had overspent the $1 billion that Clifton Garvin had initially allocated in 1964. The oil industry as a whole was suffering, causing Exxon to focus its management on its primary business. The electronic power systems company and other projects had already been closed, and Exxon Office Systems had failed to become a prominent force in the Office Systems market, with Garvin quoted as saying, "I just don't know where that's going. That's one of our problems." By that point, Office Systems' annual losses reached $70 million on continuing annual sales of about $200 Million, far short of the expected $1 billion that had been projected for 1985.

In late 1984, Exxon confirmed that "discussions regarding the sale of Exxon Office Systems Co. are being held." By that time, Exxon Office Systems was down to 2,300 total employees. The company wrote off $30 million in Office Systems as well.

Finally, in 1985, Lanier Business Products, a division of Harris Corp., and a major supplier to the office automation market, announced that it was acquiring Exxon Office Systems. The sale would include EOS field sales force, dealers and agents, service and support personnel, inventory, and technology rights. Lanier would also continue to provide equipment, supplies, and service, and would assume warranty responsibilities.

== List of Exxon Enterprises investments within the three selected market areas as of 1978 ==
=== Advanced Materials ===
- Emdex (silicon photodiodes)
- Intermagnetics General (superconducting materials and devices)
- Optical Information Systems (semiconductor laser diodes)
- Datascreen (electronic flat panel displays)
- Graftek (graphite-fiber reinforced plastic)
- Xentex (glass-fiber reinforced structural foam plastic)

=== New Energy Systems ===
- Electric Power Conversion Systems (DC to AC power synthesizers)
- Solar Power Corporation (solar photovoltaic cells)
- Daystar (solar heating systems)
- Environmental Data (air pollution instrumentation)

=== Information Systems ===
- Qwip Systems (fax machines) - an in-house venture started in 1972.
- Vydec (word processors)
- Qume (character impact printers) Exxon's 9% stake was sold in 1979 to ITT Corp for a 24x return on investment)
- Qyx (microprocessor-driven electronic typewriters)
- Dialog (computerized speech recognition)
- Ramtek (interactive color graphics displays)
- Periphonics (communications interfaces)
- Delphi (automated telephone answering systems)
- Zilog (microprocessors)
- Magnex (thin-film magnetic disc drive heads)
- Scan-Tron (mark reader for scholastic test scoring)
- Electromedical Systems (solid-state electrosurgical equipment)
- InteCom (voice and data switching networks)
