= CMS Enhancements =

US computer company (1983–1993)

CMS Enhancements Inc.
- Formerly: Complete Management Systems
- Industry: Computer
- Founded: 1983; 43 years ago in Irvine, California
- Founders: Jamshed Farooquee; Mason Tarkeshian; Tom Ong
- Successor: AmeriQuest Technologies (1993); CMS Products (1997)
- Products: Data storage
- Number of employees: 549 (early 1990s, peak)

CMS Enhancements Inc. (originally Complete Management Systems) was an American computer company headquartered in Irvine, California. Founded in 1983, the company's main product lines in the 1980s were internal and external hard drives and tape drives. The company's hard drives were chiefly sourced from Seagate and reconfigured in bespoke configurations for certain computing platforms, such as the Macintosh (under the MacLite name), the IBM PC, and the Compaq Deskpro, among others.

The company encountered financial difficulty in the early 1990s following two failed attempts at selling its own personal computers, and it reorganized into AmeriQuest Technologies in 1993.

== History ==
=== 1983–1990 ===
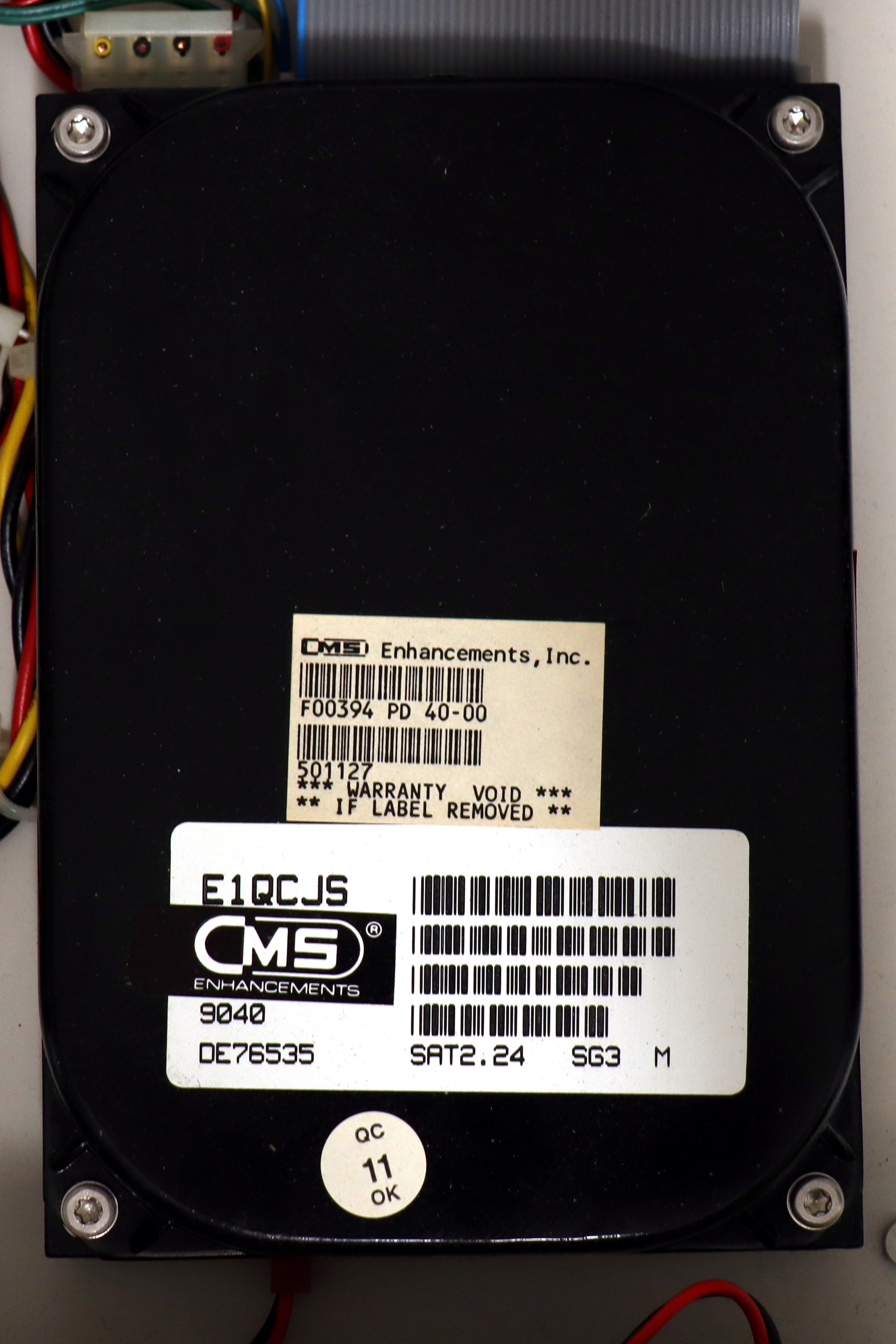
A CMS-branded SCSI hard drive

CMS Enhancements was founded in Irvine, California, as Complete Management Systems in July 1983, by Jamshed "Jim" Farooquee, Mason Tarkeshian, and Tom Ong. Farooquee, the principal founder, had moved to the United States after graduating from a technical college in Karachi, Pakistan, in 1976. He funded CMS's start-up period with $12,000 of his personal funds. In 1986, the company went public. Early in the next year CMS achieved a $36 share price, its peak.

Fueled by growth in 1987 leading to $133 million in sales, CMS expanded rapidly in 1988. The company by 1989 had more than 300 distinct mass storage products—now including tape drives—and had introduced graphic cards, memory expansion boards, and uninterruptible power supplies under the CMS brand. While most of these were rebadged or re-engineered products from OEMs (such as Seagate for their hard drives), the tape drive products were of CMS' manufacture, the result of the purchase of North Atlantic Industries' Data Storage Products division in April 1988. Based in Long Island, New York, North Atlantic's DSP division had manufactured a wide variety of tape drives for personal and enterprise computers. Along with the acquisition of its intellectual property, inventory, and tooling came a 10,000-square-foot facility in Singapore and a 5,000-square-foot plant in Long Island. The purchase of the North Atlantic DSP allowed CMS to manufacture its own products for the first time. CMS's first product to come from these factories was the LiteTape, a 40-MB portable tape drive for PC-compatible laptops like the Toshiba T1200 and Zenith SupersPort, introduced in 1989.

Back in Tustin, the company operated a 73,000-square-foot facility; in 1988, the company purchased another 50,000-square-foot building in the city. In August 1988 they opened up a branch office in the Netherlands. Right before the end of 1988, Tarkeshian and Ong left the company, the latter retiring at the age of 60. By June 1989, CMS reached sales of $200 million, a 32 percent increase from the previous year, while net income reached to $4.8 million, a 92 percent increase from 1988.

=== 1990–1997 ===
CMS began to flounder in the early 1990s. The first of its difficulties were faulty hard drive units delivered to CMS by Seagate in late 1988, which led to numerous RMAs and requests for refunds from CMS customers. Secondly, its acquisition of North Atlantic DSP with all its factory space turned out too complex for CMS to manage, leading to multi-million dollar write-offs by 1992, at which point the company had 440 employees worldwide. A price war in the external data storage industry led to a shrinking market share for CMS between 1990 and 1991. These combined difficulties led to CMS posting its first loss in June 1991, of $8.5 million. In an attempt to turn the company's fortunes around by diversifying its portfolio, CMS made a joint venture with the Korean computer manufacturer TriGem in 1991, to manufacture CMS-branded PC compatibles. CMS's entry in the personal computer arena proved very ill-timed due to a fierce price war in the segment ushered in by Compaq Computer Corporation in 1992. Virtually none of these TriGem-built CMS computer systems were ever manufactured, and the joint venture collapsed that year. CMS posted another $8.5 million in losses in June 1992.

In order to avoid seeking bankruptcy protection with the Securities and Exchange Commission, CMS was forced to downsize heavily during this time, reducing its workforce from a peak of 549 to 215 and selling off its manufacturing plants in Singapore and Pakistan (the latter opened in 1990). Following Farooquee's strict refocusing of the company's bottom line toward hard drive products, the company returned to profitability in October 1992. In December 1993, Farooquee was replaced by Hal Clark as CEO; Farooquee remained on the board of directors.

CMS again tried selling its own personal computers in late 1992, this time contracting IBM for the manufacture of its motherboards. The company opened up AnyBus Technologies and sold computers under the same brand name. It was one of the first computers on the market to support multiple competing bus architectures, namely ISA, VESA Local Bus, and the OPTiLocal bus. The AnyBus division was shuttered in February 1994, following a large-scale restructuring of CMS Enhancements that saw the company changing its name to AmeriQuest Technologies. COO Mike Rusert cited a $100,000-per-month loss on AnyBus as a reason for its closure. AmeriQuest became a value-added reseller, buying existing computer systems from established manufacturers and outfitting them with software and hardware catered to specific industries. The company was to focus on the burgeoning market for Unix-based graphical workstations, which Rusert said is "where the growth opportunity is". AmeriQuest later acquired Kenfil Distribution, a software distributor based in Van Nuys, in 1994. The drive-manufacturing unit of AmeriQuest, also known as CMS Enhancements, continued to operate as subsidiary until 1997, when AmeriQuest spun off the company, to be managed Kenneth Burke. CMS would continue operating in Orange County, in Costa Mesa, while AmeriQuest moved to Florida. This spin-off is still in business as of November 2022, as CMS Products, a data security and backup company.
