= Advanced Logic Research =

American computer company

Advanced Logic Research, Inc.

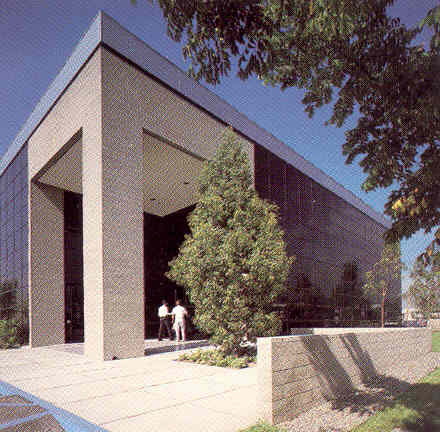
- Irvine headquarters in 1986
- Type: Public
- Traded as: Nasdaq: AALR
- Industry: Computers
- Founded: 1984; 42 years ago, in Irvine, California
- Founder: Gene Lu
- Defunct: June 19, 1997; 29 years ago
- Fate: Acquired by Gateway, Inc.
- Key people: Gene Lu (CEO); Ronald J. Sipkovich (CFO)
- Number of employees: 459 (1995)
- Website: alr.com (archived)

Advanced Logic Research, Inc. (ALR), was an American computer company founded in 1984 in Irvine, California by Gene Lu. The company marketed IBM PC compatibles across that standard's evolution until 1997 when it was acquired by Gateway 2000.

ALR had a reputation for beating its larger competitors to market with compatibles featuring cutting-edge technologies; for example, it delivered the first computer systems featuring Intel's Pentium processor in 1993. Despite its innovation, ALR struggled with brand recognition in the fiercely competitive market of low-end PCs in the mid-1990s. According to computer journalist and collector Michael Nadeau, "ALR's business strategy was to be the first to market with the latest and fastest possible PC-compatible designs", a strategy that "often succeeded".

== History ==
=== Foundation and early products (1984–1989) ===
Logo used from 1984 to 1992

Gene Lu (born c. 1954) founded Advanced Logic Research (ALR) in 1984. Lu emigrated with his family from Taiwan to El Monte, California, in 1963 and worked for Computer Automation as a systems designer in the late 1970s. Among ALR's first products was an 8088-equipped motherboard for Tava Corporation's Megaplus computer. In July 1986, ALR announced the first i386-based personal computer, the Access 386. It would have marked the first time a major component to the IBM PC standard was upgraded by a company outside IBM; however, ALR was beaten to market by Compaq with the release of the Deskpro 386 in September. Lu considered ALR's chief rival in the 1980s to be AST Research, another Irvine-based computer company also founded by former Computer Automation employees. In 1985, the Singapore-based holding company Wearnes Brothers Ltd. invested $500,000 in ALR and agreed to market the company's computers in Singapore and provide overseas manufacturing services in exchange for 40 percent of ownership. This stake grew to 60 percent over the following years.

ALR was one of the first companies to license the Micro Channel architecture from IBM in 1988. The MicroFlex 7000, released in January 1989 and configured with a 25-MHz i386 and 16 MB of SIMM random-access memory, was billed as outpacing IBM's MCA-based IBM PS/2 Model 70 due to the inclusion of a proprietary cache prefetching system in its chipset. The company's i386-based FlexCache 25386 earned the company a PC Magazine Award for Technical Excellence for desktop computers in 1988. Year-to-year sales from September 1988 totaled $40 million—one-tenth of AST's but up from $5 million in 1986—prompting Lu to negotiate to buy out the Wearnes Brothers' stake in the company. The buyout was completed in December 1988 for an undisclosed sum. ALR later abandoned Micro Channel for the competing Extended Industry Standard Architecture (EISA) in October 1989, releasing the EISA-based PowerCache/4e later that year.

==== 1989 armed robbery attempt ====
The company was the victim of an attempted armed robbery of its Irvine headquarters in April 1989. Four masked intruders pointed an assault rifle and a .45-caliber handgun at a security guard's head and demanded entry into the building. Two sanitation workers fled upstairs to a locked room and screamed, prompting the gunmen to leave. The guard was uninjured, and no property was stolen. The incident was part of a broader series of robberies targeting technology firms for high-value computer chips across the United States in 1989—five of which occurred in Orange County from November 1988 to April 1989.

=== Success and IPO (1989–1992) ===
ALR posted revenue of $73.1 million in fiscal year 1989, double that of its 1988 revenue. The company also posted between $12 and $13 million for the first two months of Q1 1989, compared to Q1 1988's total revenue of $13 million. Lu expressed interest in launching ALR's IPO in the next year. A crowded computer marketplace and ALR's lack of brand recognition put this IPO into question among investment bank analysts and industry journalists; Walter Winnitzki wrote that "anyone who wants to succeed will need both advanced products and a differentiated distribution approach". Its IPO nevertheless commenced on March 6, 1990, with 2.65 million shares sold through PaineWebber.

ALR was ranked the 25th and 26th largest personal computer manufacturer globally in 1991 and 1992, respectively, according to Electronics magazine—ahead of Unisys' presence in the market but behind Zeos International. Additionally, Fortune listed Advanced Logic Research as the 40th-fastest-growing company in the United States in 1992. Most of ALR's computers were manufactured locally in Orange County, but ALR's contract with its Singaporean manufacturers bartered under its ownership by Wearnes Brothers continued into the early 1990s to keep the price of some of its computers down.

In April 1991, ALR released the Business VEISA 486/20SX, the first computer system to ship with an i486SX processor from Intel on its motherboard from the factory.

=== Downturn and purchase (1992–1997) ===
Following strong growth in 1990 and 1991, ALR posted its first quarterly loss in Q4 1992, following a fierce competition in the low-end computer market and the ongoing recession in the United States leading to relatively high unemployment in California. The price war began after Compaq lowered prices for low-end models in spring 1992, from up to 30% above that of ALR and AST to 5% above. IBM and others also lowered prices, causing great difficulty for ALR. After announcing a new product on the morning of 10 August, for example, it lowered the price later that day. ALR's stock price reached a then all-time low of $4 per share in late September 1992, and the company laid off about 100 of its roughly 670 employees in October 1992, along with imposing a company-wide progressive salary cut for employees with salaries above $50,000—including Lu. ALR struggled through 1993, posting quarterly losses in all four fiscal quarters, before returning to profitability in Q1 1994.

In early July 1993, ALR became the first company to ship a computer system with a Pentium processor when it began shipping its Evolution V line of computers. The flagship Evolution V was intended as a workstation and included a Pentium P5 clocked at 60 or 66 MHz, six ISA expansion slots, three VESA Local Bus (VLB) slots, 8 MB of RAM (expandable to 128 MB), and an optional 170 MB hard drive. The Evolution V-Q was intended as a file server and included 13 full-sized drive bays, 1 GB of memory, ten EISA expansion slots, three VLB slots, and a 1.2 GB SCSI hard drive standard.

In March 1994, the company was awarded a patent for a microprocessor upgrade path that piggybacked off an existing processor while disabling it—a technology that ALR claimed was copied by Intel and several other PC manufacturers. ALR's stock rose from $1 per share to $7.125 following the announcement. Its shares fell to $5.125 in July of that year; however, due to customers waiting for Intel's P54C redesign to the Pentium processor to be released that summer. ALR anticipated another Q3 loss.

The company released the Optima SLR, the first Pentium-based PC priced under $1,000, in July 1995. Clocked at 75 MHz, the base system shipped without a monitor, hard drive, or peripherals, though it included 8 MB of RAM, four PCI slots (two occupied by a graphics card and a multi-I/O card), and one ISA slot. The Optima SLR was ALR's attempt to recapture the low-end computer market the company had lost. InfoWorld noted that the configuration appealed to resellers, who could increase their profit margins by bundling low-cost peripherals with the system.

In April 1996, ALR released the Revolution Quad6, the first computer system to ship with a Pentium Pro processor. It came in either single-processor or SMP configurations, supporting up to four Pentium Pro processors clocked at either 166 or 200 MHz.

Advanced Logic Research was purchased by Gateway 2000 in June 1997 in a stock swap valuated at $194 million. According to Money, the acquisition afforded Gateway ALR's "high-end client/server and high-performance desktop innovations". The company was to continue operating as a subsidiary of Gateway, with Lu remaining president while simultaneously rising to the vice presidency of Gateway 2000.
