= Falcon Northwest =

American custom PC assembler

Falcon Northwest Computer Systems, Inc.
- Type: Private
- Industry: Personal computers
- Founded: 1992
- Founder: Kelt Reeves
- Headquarters: Medford, Oregon
- Area served: Worldwide
- Key people: Kelt Reeves, President
- Website: falcon-nw.com

Falcon Northwest Computer Systems, Inc. (doing business as Falcon Northest) is an American private company headquartered in Medford, Oregon. It designs, assembles, and markets high-end custom computers. The company was founded in 1992 and was one of the first to specialize in PCs built specifically for gaming.

== History ==
Falcon Northwest was founded in April 1992 by gamer hobbyist and former pilot Kelt Reeves. Falcon Northwest released the first pre-built computer model intended specifically for gaming, the Mach V, in 1993, starting the "gaming PC" category of computer products. The company was founded in Florida, but later moved to Coos Bay, Oregon, then Ashland, Oregon, and finally Medford, Oregon.

In the late 1990s, Falcon grew to $3 million in annual revenues and opened a new manufacturing facility in Oregon. Later on, the company collaborated with Intel on early liquid cooling components. Intel worked with Falcon Northwest in secret, in order to avoid the appearance of endorsing overclocking by selling liquid cooling products under its own brand.

== Products ==
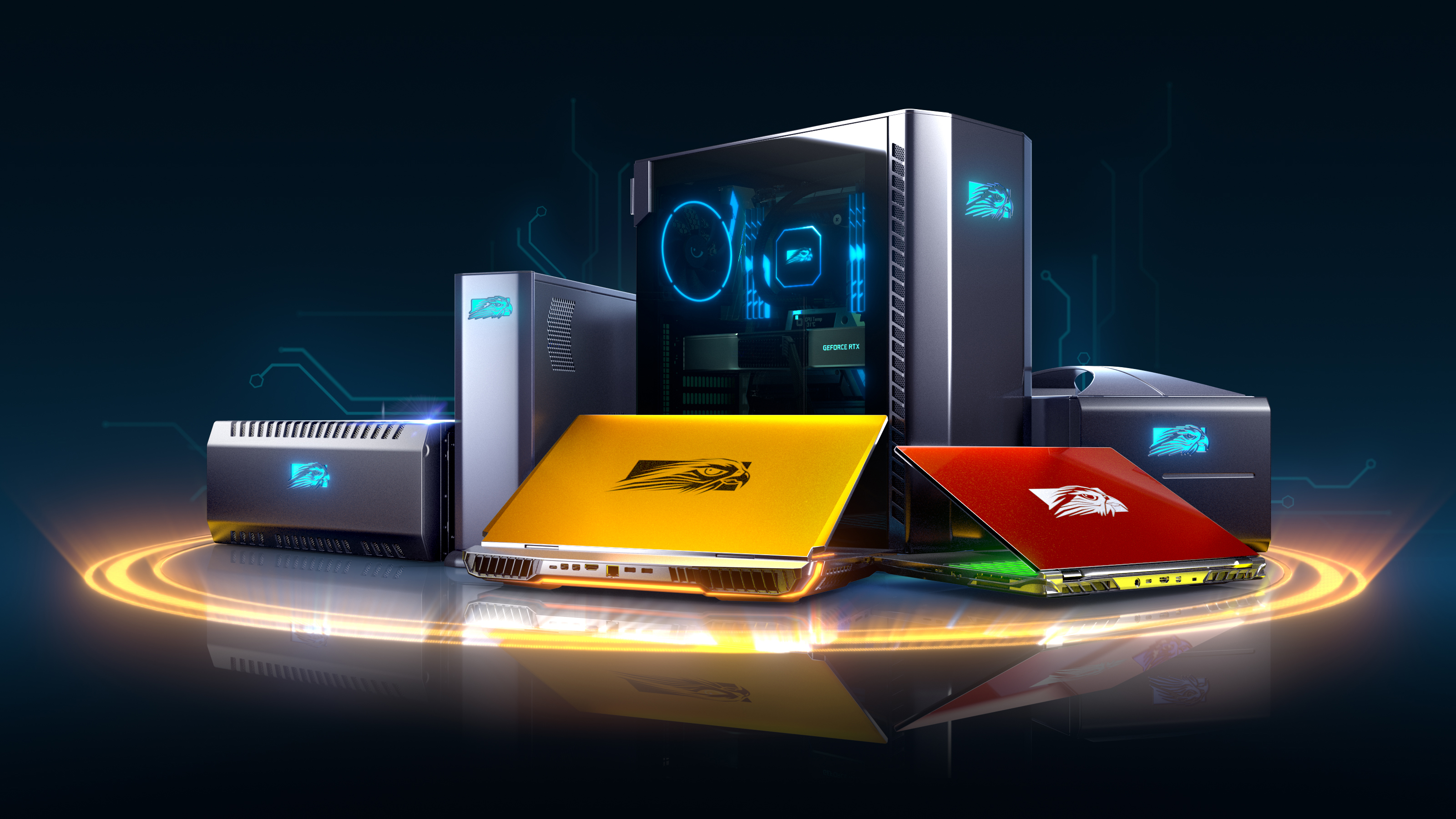
A collection of Falcon Northwest computer products

Falcon Northwest sells high-end computers that are optimized for gaming, scientific, or military applications. As of 2013, about half of its sales were from gamers. Falcon's computers are consistently highly ranked in benchmark tests, but cost $1,500 to over $10,000 depending on the user's configuration. Many Falcon PCs are sold with custom paint jobs, high-end graphics cards, and special low-latency components. Though it was originally known for tower desktops like the Mach V, and also sells laptops, as of 2017 Falcon is best known for its smaller, portable mini-PCs.

Their products include:

- Mach V - Desktop tower PC
- Talon - Desktop tower PC
- FragBox - Small Form Factor (SFF) PC
- Tiki - Micro-tower PC
- TLX - Thin & light class laptop PC
- DRX - Desktop replacement class laptop PC

== Reception ==
In benchmark tests by Maximum PC in 2018, Falcon Northwest's Tiki mini-PC performed better than a tower computer with a high-end graphics card, but was also the most expensive computer the reviewers had ever used. Similarly, Falcon's FragBox mini-PC was praised by Tom's Guide in 2017 for its appearance and power, but the configuration cost $5,000. Tom's Guide said it was "one of the best options out there" for consumers that have the budget for a high-end portable gaming computer.

PC Magazine said in 2018 that the Talon tower gaming PC from Falcon Northwest set records in benchmark performance tests and has high-quality components but was too expensive for most consumers. The same publication gave Falcon's Mach V desktop gaming computer a 5 out of 5. A 2015 review in PCWorld, praised the Mach V's performance but noted the high price that comes with buying a computer running three graphics cards.

In 2022, PC Magazine reviewed the Falcon Northwest FragBox, Talon, and Tiki. In each case, the reviewer gave the computer a 4.5 out of 5 rating. The reviews praised the three models' performance, noise, and build quality, though, like previous reviews, noted that all of Falcon Northwest's products had a high price as a result.
