= Origin PC =

Custom PC manufacturer

Origin PC Corp.
- Company type: Subsidiary
- Industry: Computer hardware
- Founded: 2009; 17 years ago
- Headquarters: Miami, Florida, U.S.
- Key people: Kevin Wasielewski, (Chief Executive Officer); Richard Cary, (President); Hector Penton, (Chief Operating Officer)
- Products: Custom Desktops; Custom Laptops
- Parent: Corsair Gaming, Inc.
- Website: www.originpc.com

Origin PC Corp. is a custom personal computer manufacturing company located in Miami, Florida. Founded by former Alienware employees in 2009, Origin PC assembles high-performance gaming and professional-use desktop and laptop computers from third-party components.

== History ==
Soon after the acquisition of Alienware by Dell, former executives Kevin Wasielewski, Richard Cary, and Hector Penton formed Origin PC in Miami, Florida. The company states that the name Origin came from the company's intention to get back to the roots of building custom, high-performance computers for gamers and hardware enthusiasts. Origin PC's first products were the GENESIS desktop and the EON18 laptop. In 2014, Origin PC announced a new line of EVO series laptops.

On January 7, 2014, at CES, Origin PC announced and launched Genesis (Full-Tower) and Millennium (Mid-Tower) desktop case.

In July 2019, Corsair Components, Inc. announced its acquisition of Origin PC Corp. In February 2024, Corsair announced it would be shutting down Origin's Miami facility and relocating production to Atlanta. 55 employees were laid off as a result.

== Hardware ==
Origin gaming laptops are based upon the Clevo whitebox notebook chassis.

== See also ==
- List of computer system manufacturers
