= List of computers running CP/M =

Many microcomputer makes and models could run some version or derivation of the CP/M disk operating system. Eight-bit computers running CP/M 80 were built around an Intel 8080/8085, Zilog Z80, or compatible CPU. CP/M 86 ran on the Intel 8086 and 8088. Some computers were suitable for CP/M as delivered. Others needed hardware modifications such as a memory expansion or modification, new boot ROMs, or the addition of a floppy disk drive. A few very popular home computers using processors not supported by CP/M had plug-in Z80 or compatible processors, allowing them to use CP/M and retaining the base machine's keyboard, peripherals, and sometimes video display and memory.

The following is an alphabetical list of some computers running CP/M.

== A ==
- Ai Electronics ABC-24 / ABC-26 (Japan, running Dosket, CP/M & M/PM)
- Action Computer Enterprise ACE-1000
- Action Computer Enterprise Discovery D-500 (CP/M-80 on each of up to 4 user processors, DPC/OS on service processor)
- Action Computer Enterprise Discovery D-1600 (CP/M-80 on each of up to 15 user processors, DPC/OS on service processor)
- Actrix Computer Corp. Actrix (Access Matrix)
- Advanced Digital Corporation Super Six
- Allen Bradley Advisor - Industrial Programmable controller graphical user interface (development mode only), fl. ca. 1985
- Alspa
- MITS Altair 8800
- Altos 580
- Amada Aries 222/245 CNC turret punch press
- Amstrad CPC 464 (w/DDI-1 disk drive interface), 664, 6128, 6128Plus
- Amstrad PCW 8256/8512/9512/9256/10
- Amust Executive 816
- Apple II (with a Z-80 card like the Microsoft SoftCard; on some clones a SoftCard equivalent was built into the mainboard)
- Apple III (with a Z-80 card like the Apple SoftCard III)
- Applied Technology MicroBee (56KB+ RAM models)
- Aster CT-80
- Atari 8-bit computers (with 64k SWP ATR8000 module, LDW Super 2000, CA-2001 or Indus GT disk drives expanded to 64k)
- Atari ST - runs GEMDOS, which was DRI's more advanced replacement for CP/M for use with their GEM GUI
- ATM-turbo - Soviet/Russian clone of ZX-Spectrum with extension graphic and 512/1024Kb RAM: CP/M 2.2 in ROM
- AT&T 6300 with CPU 3 upgrade
- AT&T 6300 PLUS

== B ==
- Basis 108
- BBC Micro/Master (with external Z80 module - or Raspberry Pi based system)
- Beehive Topper II
- BMC if-800
- Bondwell II,12, 14
- BT Merlin M2215 series based on ICL PC-2 (CP/M) (also ran MP/M II+)
- BT Merlin M4000 series based on Logica Kennett (Concurrent CP/M-86)

== C ==
- Camputers Lynx (96k/128k models)
- Casio FP1000 FL
- CASU Super-C - Z80 based with a 21 slot S100 bus (Networkable with MP/M) - UK manufactured
- CASU Mini-C - Z80 based with a 7 slot S100 bus and twin 8" floppy disk drives (Networkable with MP/M) - UK manufactured
- Challenger III - Ohio Scientific OSI-CP/M
- Cifer Systems 2684, 2887, 1887 - Melksham, England.
- CIP04 - Romanian computer
- CoBra - Romanian computer
- Coleco Adam (with a CP/M digital data pack)
- Comart Communicator (CP/M-80), C-Frame, K-Frame, Workstation and Quad (Concurrent CP/M-86)
- Commodore 64 (with Z80 plug-in cartridge)
- Commodore 128 (using its internal Z80 processor—along with its 8502—ran CP/M+ which supported memory paging)
- Compaq Portable - was available with CP/M as a factory installed option.
- Compis
- Compupro
- Cromemco
- C't180 HD64180 ECB-System (CP/M2.2 & 3.x)
- Cub-Z - Romanian made computer

== D ==
- Datamax UV-1R
- Data Soft PCS 80 and VDP 80 (France, 1977)
- Data Technology Industries "Associate" (USA, 1982)
- Digico Prince (UK, 1982)
- DEC Rainbow 100/100+ (could run both CP/M and CP/M-86)
- DEC VT180 (aka Personal Computing Option, aka 'Robin')
- Digital Group DG1

== E ==
- Eagle Computer Eagle I, II, III, IV, V
- ELWRO 800 Junior Polish clone of Sinclair ZX spectrum—running CP/J, a CP/M derivative with simple networking abilities
- ENER 1000
- Enterprise 128 (with EXDOS/IS-DOS extensions)
- Epic Episode
- Epson PX-4, PX-8 (Geneva), QX-10, QX-16
- Eracom ERA-50 & ERA-60 with encrypted disks (Eracom Corporation, Australia)
- Exidy Sorcerer

== F ==
- Ferguson Big Board
- FK-1 - Czech microcomputer
- Franklin ACE 1000 (with Microsoft Z-80 SoftCard)
- Franklin ACE 1200 (includes a rebranded PCPI Appli-Card)
- Fujitsu Micro 7 (with Z-80 plug-in card)

== G ==
- General Processor GPS5 (Italy, running CP/M 86 - Concurrent CP/M 86)
- General Processor Model T (Italy, 1980 running CP/M 80)
- Grundy NewBrain
- Genie II, IIs, III, IIIs
- Goupil G3 (SMT) with the Z80 CPU card
- G.Z.E. UNIMOR Bosman 8 (Poland, 1987 running CPM/R, CP/M 2.2 compatible)
- Gemini 801 and Gemini Galaxy (UK, 1981-1983 running CP/M 2.2 and MP/M)
- GNAT Computers (San Diego 1975-? CP/M 2.2 Industrial Control Systems, Sail Cutting and others)

== H ==
- HBN Computer (Le) Guépard
- HC-88
- HC-2000
- Heath/Zenith Heathkit H90|H90 and Heathkit H89/Zenith Z-89
- Hewlett-Packard HP-85 / HP-87 (with addition of CP/M Module containing Z80)
- Hewlett-Packard HP-125 and HP-120, one Z80 each for CP/M and the inherent HP terminal
- Hobbit
- Holborn 6100
- Holborn 9100 (Netherlands, 1981)
- Husky Computers Ltd Hunter (1 and 2, 16), Hawk

== I ==
- Ibex 7150 and other models
- ICL PC-1 (CP/M) (also ran MP/M)
- ICL PC-2 (CP/M) (also MP/M II+)
- ICL PC-16 (Concurrent CP/M-86)
- ICL PC Quattro (Concurrent CP/M-86)
- ICL DRS8801 (CP/M-86)
- ICL DRS300 (Concurrent CP/M-86)
- ICL DRS20 (CP/M or Concurrent CP/M-86)
- IBM Displaywriter
- IBM PC (CP/M-86 only; CP/M-80 with the Baby Blue Z-80 card)
- IMSAI 8080
- IMSAI VDP-80 (8085 3 MHz)
- Intel MDS-80
- Intertec Superbrain
- Iotec
- Iskra Delta Partner
- Itautec I-7000, I-7000G, I-7000 Jr. (SIM/M)
- ITT 3030
- Ivel Ultra

== J ==
- JET-80 (Swedish Made Computer)
- Juku E5101–E5104 came with an adaptation of CP/M called EKDOS
- JUNIOR Romanian Computer

== K ==
- Kaypro
- KC 85/2-4
- Kontron PSI98 (KOS & CP/M2.2)
- Korvet (Корвет) — Soviet PC

== L ==
- Labtam
- LNW-80
- LOBO Max-80
- Logica VTS 2200 (CP/M-86)
- Logica VTS Kennet (Concurrent CP/M-86)
- LOS 25 (10 MB harddisc)
- Luxor ABC 802, ABC 806 (Sweden, 1981)

== M ==
- MCP (128K, Z80, S-100 bus)
- MC CP/M Computer (Z80 ECB-System, CP/M2.2)
- Megatel Quark
- Memotech MTX
- MicroBee
- Micro Craft Dimension 68000 (CP/M-68K, and CP/M-80 with optional Z80 card)
- Micromation M/System, Mariner and MiSystem (MP/M and MP/M II)
- Micromint SB180 (Hitachi HD64180 CPU)
- Mikromeri Spectra Z (Finland)
- Molecular Super Micro 8A (CPM or MPM II)
- Morrow Designs (MD2, MD3, MD11)
- MSX (some MSX-standard machines ran the CP/M-like MSX-DOS)
- Mycron 3
- M 18 Romanian Computer
- M 118 Romanian Computer
- MK 45 Polish computer based on MCY7880

== N ==
- N8VEM
- N8VEM ZetaSBC
- NABU Network PC
- Nascom 1, 2
- NCR Decision Mate V
- NEC APC
- NEC PC-8001 Mk II
- NEC PC-8801
- Nelma Persona
- NorthStar Advantage (all in one computer)
- NorthStar Horizon (S-100)
- Nokia MikroMikko 1
- NYLAC Computers NYLAC (S-100)

== O ==
- Ohio Scientific computers using the 510 triple-processor CPU board
- OKI IF-800 (Z80 5 MHz) Second Z80 on video controller
- Olivetti ETV300
- Olivetti M20 (CP/M-8000)
- Osborne 1
- Osborne Executive
- Osborne Vixen
- Otrona Attaché
- Otrona Attaché 8:16

== P ==
- P112
- Philips P2000T
- Philips 3003/3004
- Piccolo RC-700|Piccolo
- Partner RC-750|Piccolo
- Piccoline RC-759
- Pied Piper
- PolyMorphic Systems 8813
- The Portable Computer Co (AU) PortaPak
- Pravetz 8M
- Profi - Soviet/Russian clone of ZX-Spectrum with extension grafic and 1024Kb RAM: CP/M plus in ROM
- Processor Technology Sol-20 (optional)
- Pulsars Little Big Board

== Q ==
- Quasar Data Products QDP-300
- Quay Computer Corporation Quay-900

== R ==
- RAIR "Black Box" (also ran MP/M)
- Regnecentralen Piccolo RC-700
- Regnecentralen Piccoline RC-759
- Research Machines 380Z and LINK 480Z
- Retro! Z80 by John Winans
- Rex Computer Company REX 1
- Robotron A 5120
- Robotron KC 85, KC 87
- Robotron PC 1715
- Royal Business Machines 7000 "Friday"

== S ==
- SAGA PBS-800
- SAGE II / IV CP/M-68K
- SAM Coupé - (Pro-Dos = CP/M 2.2)
- Samsung SPC-1000
- Sanyo MBC families (i.e. MBC-1150)
- SBS 8000
- Scandis
- Seequa Chameleon
- Sharp MZ series
- Sharp X1 series
- Sirius 1 (sold in the U.S. as the Victor 9000)
- SKS KISS
- Software Publisher's ATR8000
- Sony SMC-70
- Sord M5 has CP/M as an option, CP/M-68K standard for the M68/M68MX
- Spectravideo SV-318/328
- Sperry Univac UTS 40 CP/M 2.2 - Zilog 80
- Stride 400 series CP/M-68K was one of many operating systems on these
- SWP ATR-8000 CPM 2.2 - Z80 4mhz
- SWP ATR-8500 CPM 2.2 - Z80 4mhz 'Littleboard" form-factor
- Symag Micromachine 2000 and 3000: CP/M 2.2, MPM
- Symag Micromachine 4000: Concurent CP/M-86
- Symag Orchidée with Z80 cartridge: CP/M 3
- Symag Orchidée with 80186 cartridge: Concurent CP/M-86

== T ==
- Tatung Einstein TC-01 (runs Xtal/DOS which is CP/M compatible)
- Tandy TRS-80 CP/M 2.2 (Models I, II, III, IV, and 4) Z80
- Tandy TRS-80 Model 100 with REXCPM add-on CPM 2.2, 8085 CPU
- Technical Design Labs (TDL) XITAN
- TeleData (Z80 Laptop)
- Telenova Compis (CP/M-86)
- Teleputer III
- TeleVideo TS-80x Series
- TeleVideo TS-160x Series
- TI-99/4A (with the MorningStar CP/M card or the Foundation CP/M card)
- Tiki-100 (runs KP/M, or later renamed TIKO. A CP/M 2.2 Clone.)
- TIM-011
- TIM-S Plus
- Timex FDD3000 (on Z80 CPU) with ZX Spectrum as terminal.
- Toshiba T100
- Toshiba T200
- Toshiba T200 C-5
- Toshiba T200 C-20
- Toshiba T250
- Transtec BC2
- Triumph-Adler AlphaTronic P1/P2
- Triumph-Adler AlphaTronic P3/P4
- Triumph-Adler AlphaTronic P30/P40
- Triumph-Adler AlphaTronic PC (CPU was a Hitachi Z80 clone)
- Tycom Microframe

== U ==
- Unitron 8000, a dual processor machine built São Paulo in the early 1980s. The Unitron could boot either as an Apple II clone (using a clone 6502 processor) or in CP/M (using the Z80).

== V ==
- Vector-06C (Intel 8080, 16 color graphics, made in USSR)
- Vector Graphic Vector Graphic Corporation Vector Model 1,2 (Internal Model),3, Model 4 (Z80 & 8088 CP/M, CP/M-86 & PCDOS), Model 10 (Multiuser)
- Victor 9000 (sold as the Sirius 1 in Europe)
- Video Technology Laser 500/700
- Visual Technology (Lowell, Ma) Visual 1050, 1100 (Not Released)

== W ==
- Wave Mate Bullet
- Welect 80.2 (France, 1982)
- West PC-800

== X ==
- Xerox 820
- Xerox Sunrise 1800 / 1805

== Y ==
- Yodobashi Formula-1

== Z ==
- Zenith Data Systems Z-89 (aka Heathkit H89)
- Zenith Data Systems Z-100 (CP/M-85)
- Zorba
- ZX Spectrum family (built by Amstrad)
