= List of TRS-80 clones =

The following is a list of clones of Tandy's TRS-80 model I and III home computers:

- Aster CT-80 by Aster b.v. (Netherlands)
- DGT-100 and DGT-1000 by Digitus (Brazil)
- D8000, D8001 and D8002 by Dismac (Brazil)
- Komtek I by Komtek Technologies (Hong Kong)
- Le Guépard by HBN Electronic Sa (France)
- LNW-80 by LNW Research (United States)
- Max-80 by Lobo Systems (United States)
- Meritum by Mera-Elzab (Poland)
- MTI Mod III Plus by Microcomputer Technology Inc. (United States)
- CP-300 and CP-500 by Prológica (Brazil)
- Pentasonic PROF 80 (France)
- R1001 by Radionic (United Kingdom)
- Sysdata Jr by Sysdata Eletrônica Ltda (Brazil)
- Video Genie (also known as the "Dick Smith System-80" or the "PMC-80") by EACA (Hong Kong)
- Misedo 85 by Montex (Socialist Federal Republic of Yugoslavia)
- HT-1080Z School Computer (Híradástechnikai Szövetkezet, Hungary)
- SpotLight I (스포트라이트I) by Hanguk Sangyeok (한국상역) (South Korea)
- Stolový Počítač SP830 by ZVT (Czech Republic)
