= Dimension 68000 =

Microcomputer introduced by the Micro Craft Corporation in 1983

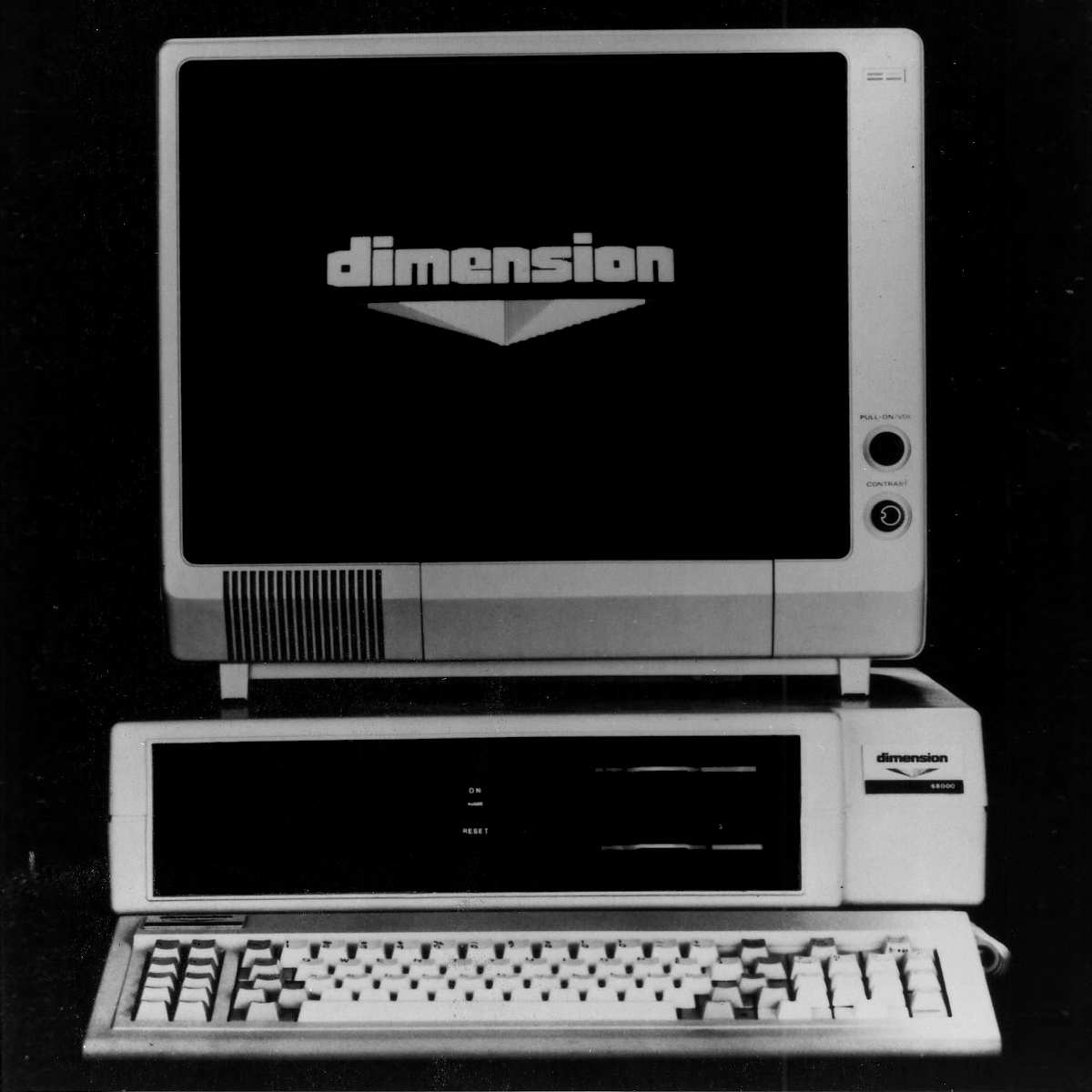
- Developer: Micro Craft Corporation
- Manufacturer: Micro Craft Corporation
- Type: Microcomputer
- Released: October 1983; 43 years ago
- Lifespan: 1983–1986
- Discontinued: 1986; 40 years ago
- Media: 5.25-inch floppy disks
- Operating system: Apple DOS; CP/M-68K; CP/M-80; Mirage; MS-DOS; PC DOS; ProDOS; SofTech Pascal; Unibasic
- CPU: Motorola 68000 (native); MOS 6512 (Apple II mode); Intel 8086 (IBM PC mode); Zilog Z80A (CP/M-80 mode)
- Memory: 128 KB – 512 KB (up to 16 MB on memory expansion card)
- Storage: Hard disk drives
- Power: 100 W, 15 A switched-mode power supply
- Platform: Apple II; IBM PC; Kaypro II; Osborne 1
- Dimensions: 18 by 18 by 6 inches (46 cm × 46 cm × 15 cm)
- Weight: 22–27 lbs (10-12.2 kg)
- Successor: New Dimension 68000 (1987)

The Dimension 68000 is a microcomputer introduced by the Micro Craft Corporation in 1983 that emulates the Apple II, the IBM PC, and various CP/M-centric computers through a family of coprocessor expansion cards and emulation software. The Dimension 68000 can also run as a standalone computer based on the Motorola 68000 from which it gets its namesake. The computer is mostly the brainchild of Mike Carpenter, a former executive of a scientific instrument manufacturer who incorporated Micro Craft in Dallas, Texas, to develop the Dimension 68000. It had a market lifespan of three years and received mixed, mostly positive, reception from the technology press. Criticism was leveled at the $6,250 price tag for the computer with the full deck of coprocessor cards, as well as the extent of the emulation power of those cards.

== Specifications ==
=== Main unit and keyboard ===
The Dimension 68000 is a desktop microcomputer whose main unit measures 18 by 18 by 6 inches (46 by 46 by 15 cm) and weighs between 22 and 27 pounds (10.0 and 12.2 kg), depending on the configuration. The main unit comprises a steel chassis with a cream-painted lid, a material chosen to resist RF interference. Early models had a chassis constructed from Noryl thermoplastic, painted cream on the outside and coated with conductive nickel paint on its underside. Six screws hold the lid on and can be unfastened for servicing. Micro Craft encouraged user-servicing from the onset and did not void the warranty of purchasers should they have opened the case, as was an increasing practice around the time of the Dimension's release. The dual 5.25-inch floppy disk drives and the accompanying full-drive-height blanking plate of the stock configuration feature black trim. Next to the disk drives is a reset button; the functionality of the button can be disabled in software to prevent accidental actuation. In the rear of the main unit are six expansion card holes which may be populated depending on the configuration (all six are populated with blanking plates in stock configuration), as well as one RS-232 serial port, a Centronics-style parallel port, the keyboard port, a joystick port, and the composite video output jack. A 100-watt, 15-amp switched-mode supply powers the unit and was described by Microcomputing magazine as "offer[ing] enough juice to power just about any board you'd want to add".

The motherboard of the Dimension 68000 comprises a four-layer printed circuit board. It rests on the bottom of the chassis and features six expansion slots. Among the other logic chips on the motherboard resides the main microprocessor—a Motorola 68000 clocked at 8 MHz—and the random-access, DIP memory chips. These chips takes up most of the footprint of the motherboard and are laid out as four banks of 17. The motherboard accepts a total of 512 KB of RAM on the motherboard. Additional RAM could be installed only on expansion cards; Micro Craft promised a memory expansion card in early 1984, for which multiple orders of the card could be used within the same machine and expand the computer's memory to 16 MB—the full amount of RAM that the Motorola 68000 can address. The stock configuration of the Dimension 68000 came only with 256 KB of RAM. An 8-KB read-only memory chip holds the bootstrap code, the Dimension 68000's BIOS, and basic diagnostic utilities. All the chips on the motherboard are socketed, rather than soldered.

The disk drives of the stock Dimension 68000 consist of two half-height, 5.25-inch, 40-track floppy drives. Two more half-height 5.25-inch floppy drives can be outfitted in the blank full-drive-height space to the right, or one full-height hard drive can be installed in the same space. The floppy drives are controlled by the NEC 765 chip, a versatile controller that supports numerous contemporary floppy disk encoding schemes, allowing it to read and format disks for the computer's IBM PC and CP/M-80 emulation modes. The Apple II emulation mode required its own unique floppy controller on the Apple II coprocessor card (see § Coprocessor cards). Hard drives also required their own controllers, included on expansion cards sold by Micro Craft with the drive or should the computer have been optioned with one; this controller card was not available in the first few months of the Dimension 68000's market availability. A utility included in the system disk also allows the floppy drives to read disks formatted in IBM PC CP/M, the TRS-80 range, all of Kaypro's computers, and single-density drives used by Cromemco and Osborne computers.

The computer has no prescribed monitor, and purchasers were expected to buy one separately. It did come packaged with a keyboard, built by Key Tronic and which features the same layout and interface as the keyboard for the IBM PC and PC XT. The display output of the stock machine generates composite video for both graphics and text. The text output was multi-mode and supported the following resolutions expressed as rows by columns of text: 20 by 20, 40 by 24, 80 by 24, and 50 by 25, non-interlaced; 80 by 50 and 100 by 50, interlaced. For graphics, the horizontal resolution of the stock machine is limited to 525-lines of NTSC video. An RGB expansion card for digital component video output was introduced sometime between July 1984 and April 1985.

=== Expansion bus, coprocessor cards, and emulation modes ===
The Dimension 68000's coprocessor expansion cards were the main draw of the computer because it promised a cross-platform experience in one unit. Regardless, purchasers could have ordered a Dimension 68000 without any cards and have it still be functional as a 68000-based computer, albeit with a limited selection of turnkey applications. The Dimension 68000's expansion bus is of Micro Craft's own proprietary design, although its specification was open to prospective third-party manufacturers, as well as a development-kit version of the computer with a prototyping perfboard included. The bus connectors are 86 pins wide, allowing access to the computer's 16-bit data path, 24-bit address lines, and the Motorola 68000's major and memory-access signals, as well as providing individual direct memory access and interrupt capabilities for each slot. The bus also conveys all disk drive signals, allowing expansion cards to equip disk controllers besides the built-in NEC 765; such is the case with the Apple II coprocessor card.

The Dimension 68000 was described as a "hybrid emulator"—that is, each of the coprocessors performed the bulk of code execution in their respective emulation modes, while certain memory-resident programs handled elements of emulation in the background. The Motorola 68000 additionally handled certain interrupts the coprocessors by themselves could not execute—chiefly regarding display output and disk reading and writing.

From its inception through to its demise, Micro Craft only offered three expansion cards for the Dimension 68000—an IBM PC emulation card, an Apple II emulation card, and a CP/M card for Zilog Z80–based machines such as the Kaypro and Osborne 1. In order to use any of these emulation cards, an "emulation master" disk comprising the specific files included in the master system disk had to be written to a user's spare floppy disk, in a process outlined in the copy utility included in the master disk and in the Dimension 68000's manual. This "emulation master" disk is necessary to boot from any of the three emulation cards. The user then has to insert the system disk into drive A and the "emulation master" disk into drive B and type into the default system prompt, e.g., B: IBM, to boot into the IBM PC emulation mode. Both disks could then be removed from the drives, and specific IBM PC software can be loaded from disk.

==== Apple II card ====
The Apple II coprocessor card runs off an MOS 6512, as opposed to the real Apple II's MOS 6502, because of the former's reliance on an external clock generator—a setup better suited for multiprocessor arrangements such as the Dimension 68000. A bespoke floppy controller is also included on the Apple II coprocessor card, necessary for allowing the floppy drive motor to move in half-steps among tracks, a feature favored by certain Apple II software developers to copy-protect their commercial releases. Copy protection schemes relying on specific timings of the Apple II's disk loader routine, on the other hand, may cause some software to fail to load, because of the Motorola 68000's handling of certain interrupts during this routine.

As opposed to loading IBM emulation mode, which only requires the user enter B: IBM at the Dimension 68000's native CP/M prompt, the Dimension 68000's Apple II emulation mode requires the user enter several arguments after B: APPLE. These arguments specify the presence of a printer, how many disk drives if any are to be emulated, the type of keyboard, the type of display, and so on.

The Apple II emulation mode additionally requires the user provide their own copy of an operating system, such as Apple DOS or ProDOS. Once booted into a Applesoft BASIC prompt, however, the interpreter recognizes all BASIC syntax, down to the PEEKs and POKEs. As well, the Apple II coprocessor card emulates a full deck of Apple II peripheral cards: in slot 0 is the 16 KB Language Card; in slot 1 is the parallel card; in slot 2 is the serial card; in slot 3 is the 80-Column Text Card; in slot 6 is the floppy controller, with two virtual Apple disk drives plugged in; and in slot 7 is the hard drive controller card. Applesoft BASIC can be used to invoke any of these cards with expected behavior; for example, to load the 80-Column Text Card, the user enters PR#3 at the prompt.

==== IBM PC card ====
The IBM PC coprocessor card runs off an Intel 8086 clocked at 7.3 MHz, slightly less than twice the speed of the IBM PC's 4.77-MHz Intel 8088 (a variant of the 8086 with an eight-bit external data bus). This faster clock speed was chosen to compensate for any slowdown caused by software emulation and interrupt handling by the Motorola 68000. The resulting speed of calculations performed within spreadsheet software was comparable to a real IBM PC's speed, according to Popular Computing.

The standard IBM emulation program on the IBM "emulation master" disk emulates an IBM PC with a CGA monitor displaying text at 80 columns by 25 rows. Three more emulation programs are located on disk. The first, IBMGRF40, emulates a PC with a CGA monitor displaying text at 40 columns by 25 rows. The second, IBMMONO, emulates a PC with a Monochrome Display Adapter monitor displaying text at 80 columns by 25 rows but incapable of displaying any graphics. The last, IBMEXP18, was an experimental "enhanced" IBM emulation mode, version 1.18, which as of September 1984 had not been fully debugged; it added direct I/O to the NEC 765 and expanded the capability of the RS-232 serial port under IBM PC emulation. All four of the aforementioned emulation programs can be run without passing any arguments, unlike with APPLE. In this way, the emulation programs defaulted to running the maximum amount of RAM possible, minus some reserved for the emulation software. Running IBM (CGA, 80-by-25 text) on a machine equipped with 512 KB of RAM, for example, left 412 KB addressable to the virtual machine. Some arguments could be passed to these emulation programs: MEM=n limited the memory to a set amount; INTENSITY rendered characters with the intensity bit set to high as reverse video (see IBM Monochrome Display Adapter § Capabilities); and CONFIG=$$$$ is a software analogue to the DIP switches on an IBM PC's motherboard, used to set certain hardware parameters.

A README file on the "emulation master" disk of the IBM PC emulation card lists known bugs. In September 1984, these included the system not falling back on IBM Advanced BASIC on the lack of a boot disk (Micro Craft had not secured the rights from IBM by then), no support for the joystick port, no direct I/O to the NEC 765 (the user had to run the experimental IBMEXP18 to get this), and channel 2 of the PC speaker not working, among others. By November 1984, the card still had no support for channel 2 of the PC speaker, and it became known that interrupt calls to the sound generator would still be handled as no-ops, leading to erratic behavior in sound-capable video games, such as Microsoft Flight Simulator.

Users could exit IBM PC emulation mode by invoking Control-Alt-Delete or by pressing the reset button on the Dimension 68000.

==== Z80 CP/M card ====
The CP/M coprocessor card runs off a 4-MHz Zilog Z80A. Unlike with the Apple II and IBM PC emulation modes, delivery of the Z80 card came with a version of CP/M 2.2 for the Z80, complete with the manual from Digital Research. The four emulator programs on the "emulation master" disk included with the CP/M card only support addressing up to 64 KB of RAM, two dual-sided, 40-track, 5.25-inch floppy disk drives, the parallel port interface (for printers), and the ADM-3 display terminal and its clones. The systems these emulators aim to reproduce are the Kaypro II (KAYPRO), the Osborne 1 (OSBORNE), and S-100-based Cromemco computers (CROMEMCO). The fourth emulator, CPM80, aims to emulate an archetypal Z80-based CP/M machine. CPM80 is the only emulator to support drive letters past B:, including C: through K: (skipping J: however), with K: being a RAM drive. KAYPRO, OSBORNE, and CROMEMCO only support drive letters A: and B:.

== Native software ==
The native operating system of the Dimension 68000, as included in the system disk, is CP/M 68K, a port of CP/M for the Motorola 68000, developed by Digital Research in the days before the Z80 came to be recognized as CP/M's de facto standard platform. Mirage, a little known operating system native to the Motorola 68000, and SofTech Pascal were offered as multi-user counterpoints to the single-user CP/M, which was seen by contemporary computer journalists as limiting the Motorola 68000's full potential. Micro Craft promised a port of Unix first in 1983, then in 1984, and again in mid-1985. Micro Craft finally delivered a four-user version of Unix for the Dimension 68000 in October 1985. Users had to purchase at least one terminal and a hard drive between 20 and 50 MB in capacity; the cost of these machines ranged between US$9,995 and $15,995. The version of CP/M 68K included with the Dimension 68000 includes the file-transfer utility PIP, the debugger DDT-68K, the file system statistic utility STAT, a Motorola 68000 C compiler, a linking loader, and a 68000 assembler.

Unibasic, a BASIC dialect developed specifically for the Dimension 68000 by Dallas-based RD Software, was also included in the package. Although native to the Motorola 68000, with all 16 MB of the Motorola 68000's address space supported by it, Unibasic was very closely based on Applesoft BASIC. For example, Unibasic's PEEKs and POKEs for manipulation of printers, video display, and keyboard input expect memory addresses identical those used by Applesoft for such devices (meanwhile APEEK and APOKE could be used to read and manipulate the absolute memory addresses of the Motorola 6800). Unibasic adds a VARPTR function (VARiable PoinTeR, i.e. return the address of a variable), a Mode statement allowing the user to change the screen format on the fly as well as the behavior of variable scrolling, and a Call statement supporting up to fifteen arguments.

At least one third-party software developer released a software package specifically for the Dimension 68000. CLYDE (Custom Logic You Design Easily), a software package for VLSI circuit design, was released by Cademic, Inc. in May 1984.

== Development and release ==
The Dimension 68000 is primarily the brainchild of Mike Carpenter, the former president of Scientific Machines, a company that manufactured scientific instruments. Development of the computer commenced on Micro Craft Corporation's incorporation in Dallas, Texas, in November 1981. Carpenter set out the Dimension 68000 to be the epitome of a "compatible" computer system—interoperable between all the popular computing platforms, providing a powerful microprocessor, and following design philosophies to make the computer as resistant to obsolescence as possible. However, a proprietary bus had to be devised, according to Carpenter, because off-the-shelf standards did not provide "access to all the signals [his team] had to make [the machine] flexible". Carpenter employed the help of several employees from IBM and Apple.

The first shipment of Dimension 68000 commenced in October 1983. The price of the base unit on launch was $3,995. For a package with all three emulation cards, the price reached $6,250 (in April 1984; equivalent to $16,302 in 2021). A network of 80 to 90 dealers was established the previous month to distribute 250 Dimension 68000s across the United States. Another round of shipments occurred in April 1984, by which point Micro Craft had culled some of their dealers, leaving 77 in their network. In 1984, the computer was introduced worldwide, imported to the United Kingdom by the Wembley-based Tashkl Computer Services and to Canada by British Columbia–based Popular Electronic Products store.

Micro Craft filed for Chapter 11 bankruptcy in early 1985. They were guided out by businessman Donald F. Bynum in less than three months and continued selling the Dimension 68000 for the next year. Although an early 1986 newspaper article noted that the Dimension 68000 "never hit it big", Micro Craft and their intellectual property were bought by an Arkansas-based holding company shortly thereafter. The company was rechristened as Dimension Electronics in 1987, releasing a redesigned version of the Dimension 68000, the New Dimension 68000, that year. This incarnation of the Dimension 68000 offered a new Macintosh emulation mode. However, it was only briefly on the market and is exceedingly rare. InfoWorld in 1989 described the overall lifespan of the Dimension 68000 as short-lived.

== Reception ==
Advertisements of the Dimension 68000 in computer magazines generated massive hype for Micro Craft, the company receiving over 50,000 queries by April 1984, according to Barbara Henry-Arnold, Micro Craft's director of communications. Interest was mostly fueled by its advertised emulation prowess. By the middle of 1985, however, Micro Craft was downplaying its role as an polymathic tool in favor of the potential for its Motorola 68000 to cooperate with the coprocessors in the computer's native mode.

Reviewing a pre-production unit, although he encountered some problems in IBM PC emulation mode, Jim Heid of Microcomputing called the Dimension's emulation powers "amazing" in its breadth. Regarding the hardware, Heid wrote that his unit "performed flawlessly ... never rebooted unless we wanted it to and the disk drives performed flawlessly ... The keyboard worked as it was supposed to and the computer's quiet cooling fan kept everything at healthy temperatures." Steve Rimmer of Computing Now! was quite impressed, calling it "unquestionably one of the most well-thought-out, profound applications of available technology [he had] seen in recent history." While he balked at the computer's CAN$6,000 price, he felt that there was "little one could point to in it and call a fault if you ignore the price" by the same token. "Its emulation modes suffered from none of the usual restrictions of emulations, [and] to wit, they were every bit as fast, flexible and useful as the real systems." Rimmer however called the machine unrealistic for prospective buyers who wanted a "clone replacer", feeling that they would be better suited buying authentically compatible systems, the combined cost of which would be less than the Dimension 68000's.

Personal Computer World's Peter Bright called the Dimension a technically "very innovative product" with its emulation modes "well executed for the most part" but cast doubt on its role in the mid-1980s computer marketplace: "My only worry is whether this is a case of building a machine for its own sake rather than because the market needs it." Bright criticized the use of CP/M-86 as a single-user operating system but saw potential if more popular multi-user OSes such as Unix came to support the Dimension 68000 and wrote that the range of its emulation was unparalleled. Bright wrote that the machine and its documentation was beginner-unfriendly. Popular Computing's Rick Cook wrote that, counter to the interest of prospective buyers who had been wooed by advertisements in computer magazines, most would be disappointed: "The Dimension 68000 is powerful, but it cannot do everything." Cook deemed the computer's native number-crunching performance good and found it one of the cheaper 68000-based microcomputers on the market, albeit at a price not factoring in a hard drive, which was seen as an increasingly important device for such micros. He saw the coprocessor arrangement useful in applications besides emulation, such as in Unix-like operating systems that could take advantage of more than one processor. But at "the $5500 cost of the Dimension emulation package," Cook wrote, "you are close to getting an IBM PC or PC clone, an Apple II, and a low-priced CP/M system, such as the Kaypro II."

Stephen T. Satchell of InfoWorld, on the other hand, found it slow in native mode—somewhere between the 8086 Compaq Deskpro and the original IBM PC in terms performance per a benchmark—but called the speed of its IBM PC emulation adequate, although the emulator did not run perfectly for him in some applications, such as Microsoft Flight Simulator and Microsoft Adventure. Overall he deemed it a jack of all trades, master of none: "We feel the emulator capability is not a cost-effective way to run software intended for many machines." He concluded by stating that if Micro Craft "would spend less time on the frill of emulation and more on the basic processing system, it would have a dynamite product." After encountering much difficulty with the Dimension's emulators, Creative Computing's John J. Anderson wrote that he felt "disheartened": "The Dimension represents a valiant attempt to encompass the best of all possible software worlds, but does not really deliver on this promise." In native mode, however, he was more impressed: "Its benchmarks are unbeatable. Native mode Fortran and Pascal on the Dimension run rings around the IBM PC AT."

== See also ==
- Challenger III by Ohio Scientific, a computer that had three processors: a 6502, a Z80, and a Motorola 6800
- Omni Convertible by Omnidata, another triple processor computer system
