= Wave Mate Bullet =

The Wave Mate Bullet was a Z80 single-board computer from 1982 which used the CP/M operating system. It was sold in Australia, the United States and Europe and was apparently popular in academic settings.

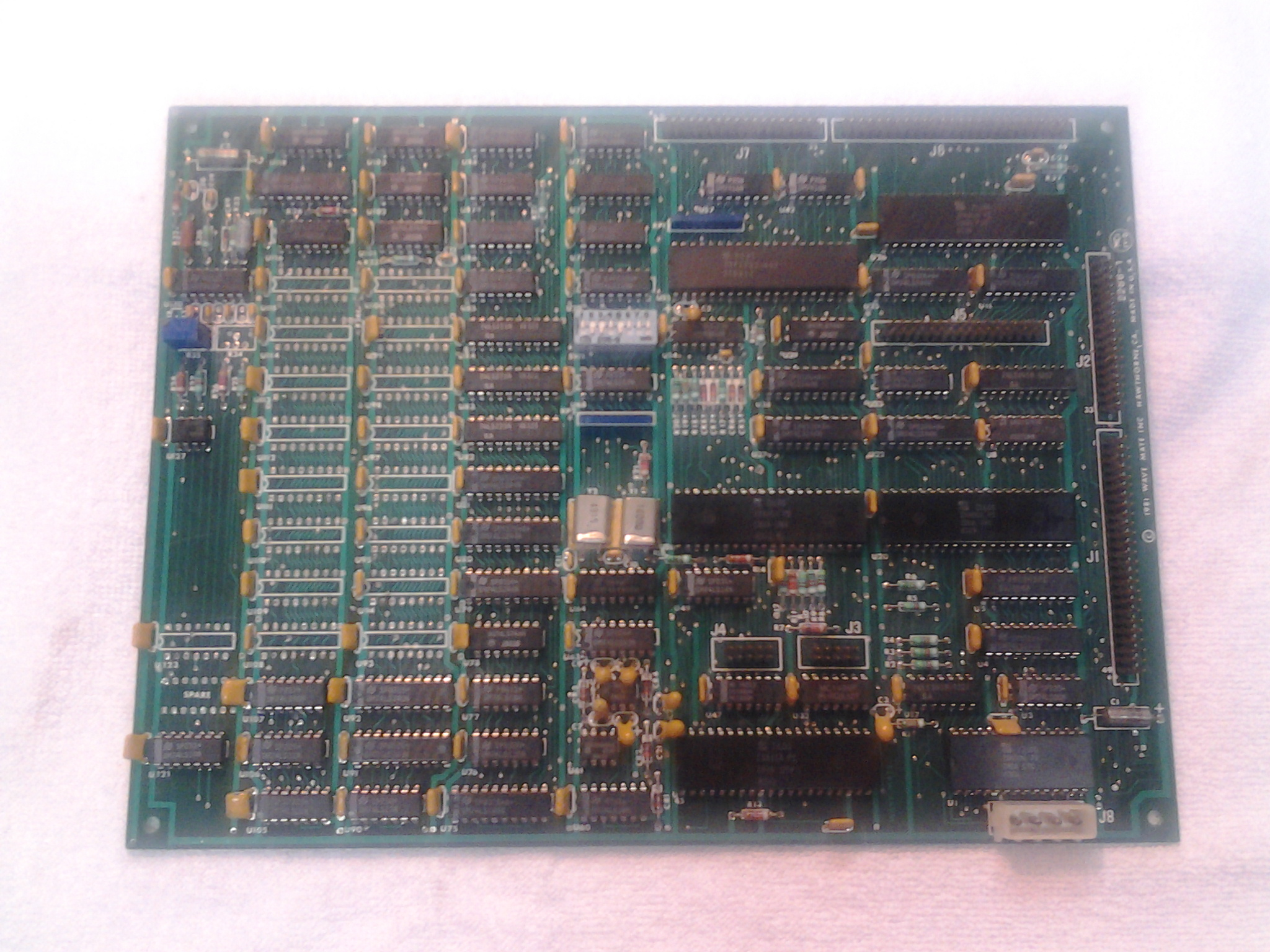
Wave Mate Bullet board

== Notability ==
The Wave Mate Bullet is notable because it represents CP/M machines at their apex. Small yet affordable machines which were quite powerful at the time with plentiful applications. Wave Mate, Inc. is a historically relevant company because one of the original microcomputer companies which released their first computer kit the Wave Mate Jupiter II in 1975. The Wave Mate Bullet represents the end of the CP/M era as the IBM PC and its clones ascended to marketplace domination.

== Configurations ==
The Wave Mate Bullet runs CP/M 3.0 and CP/M 2.2 is available. It is available in many configurations but typically is found in a small chassis with two 96 tracks per inch 5.25" floppy disk drives. The 5.25" disks were formatted on both sides with five 1024-byte sectors per track with 80 tracks per side for a total of 800K per disk.

The standard configurations includes two serial ports, a parallel port, a general purpose external DMA bus (GPED), separate connectors for 5.25" and 8" floppy disk drives, and a hard disk interface. The hard disk interface is either IMI hard disk controller model #7710 or SCSI depending on the motherboard version.
