= Visual 50 =

Computer terminal sold by Visual Technology

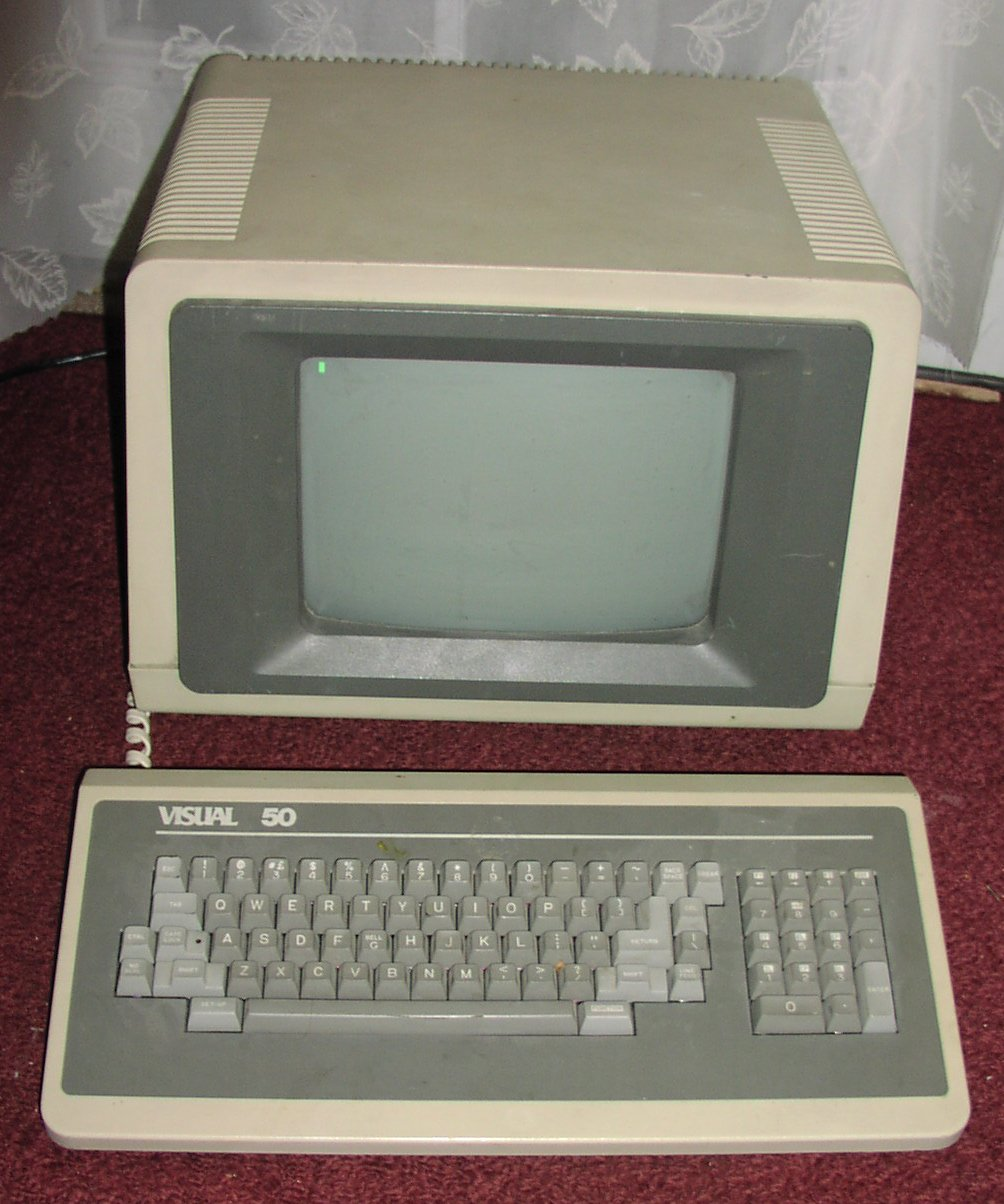
Visual 50 Computer, produced on Nov. 25 1983

The Visual 50 is a terminal created by Visual Technology, Inc., which was located in Tewksbury, Massachusetts. Visual's slogan was "See for yourself". It merged with White Pine Software in 1993, which became CU-SeeMe Networks, in turn absorbed into RadVision in 2001.

The Visual 50 and Visual 55 were low end products, being replaced in 1986 by the Visual 60 and Visual 65.

== Details ==
The terminal consists of a monitor which is the main component and a keyboard. It was used as a computer terminal so there are no internal drives or daughter cards. The primary component in the case is a motherboard with a modem port, keyboard port, and an aux. port.

Termcap provides support for the Visual 50 by way of the entries named v50, vi50, v50am, or visual50, depending on the system.

The terminal uses an SGS (now STMicroelectronics) Z8400AB1 CPU, based on the Zilog Z80A CPU. This CPU has an 8 bit data bus and a 16 bit address bus, and runs at 4 MHz. The keyboard is a Keytronic A65-0248, attached by a 4 wire telephone cord. The keyboard uses an Intel P8048H MCU, a common MCU for keyboards.

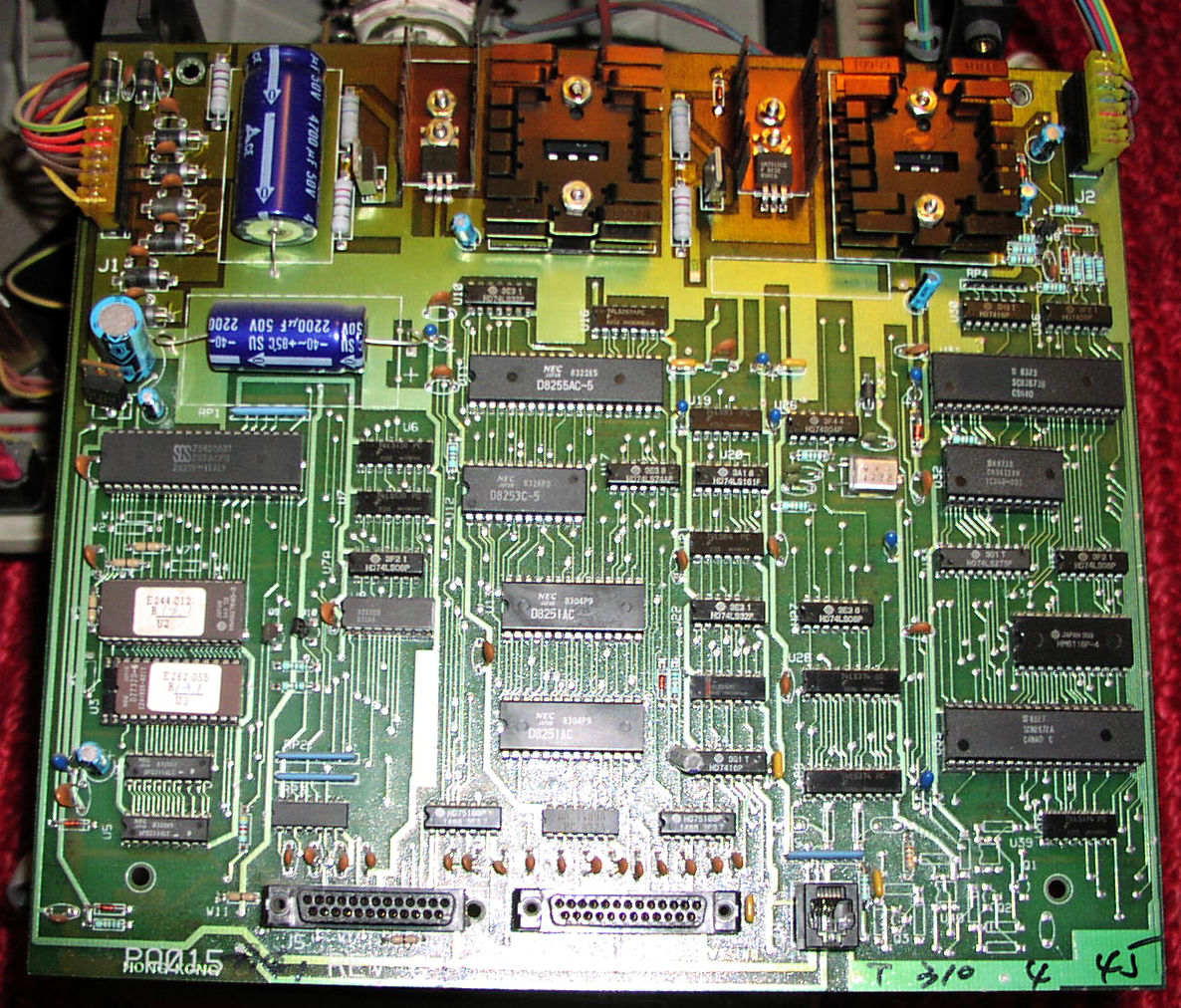
The Visual 50 Computer's motherboard

== See also ==
- Visual 1050
- CU-SeeMe
