= Omnidata =

Defunct American computer company

Omnidata Corporation
- Type: Private
- Founded: December 1978; 47 years ago in Westlake Village, California, United States
- Founder: Paul Van Alstyne
- Defunct: c. 1988
- Fate: Dissolution
- Parent: Triumph-Adler (1981–1983)

Omnidata Corporation was an American computer company active from 1978 to the late 1980s. The company was founded in Westlake Village, California, by Paul Van Alstyne in the aftermath of his company Wordplex being acquired by the Canada Development Corporation. Like Wordplex, Omnidata primarily focused on the design and manufacturing of word processing computer systems, whether they were sold by Omnidata themselves or provided to other companies to resell. In 1984, they released the Omni Convertible, a microcomputer system that supports up to three microprocessors, of differing architectures—including x86, m68k, Z80, and TMS9900—running simultaneously.

== History ==
Omnidata was founded in December 1978 in Westlake Village, California, by Paul Van Alstyne. Van Alstyne had previously co-founded Wordplex, a manufacturer of word processing computer systems also based in Westlake Village, in 1974. At Wordplex, Van Alstyne served as president; he and his team developed word processors that directly competed against IBM's offerings at the time. From 1974 to 1978, Omnidata grew from 20 employees to 200 and was the second-largest manufacturer of word processor computers, behind only IBM. In July 1978, they were acquired in full by the Canada Development Corporation (CDC)—already a principal investor in the company—and merged with AES Data Ltd. of Montreal to become AES Wordplex. (CDC later sold off AES Wordplex to Norsk Data in 1987.)

As a design consultant, Omnidata's first client was Triumph-Adler (TA) of Germany. In April 1979, they released the Bitsy line of word processor systems, designed in part by Omnidata and manufactured by TA's subsidiary Diehl Data Systems. As a result of their partnership, TA invested significant capital in Omnidata, eventually owning a 46-percent stake in the company by early 1981.

In 1980, Omnidata released their first word processing system, the Omni/1, which included two Shugart 5.25-inch floppy drives and a Qume daisy wheel printer. Omnidata manufactured the systems and developed the software entirely from their Westlake Village plant. As their end of the Bitsy deal, however, Diehl Data Systems had a hand in designing some of the Omni/1's hardware. The Omni/1 was powered by Texas Instruments' TMS9900 microprocessor. In July 1980, Omnidata leased a second building in Westlake Village dedicated to the company's direct sales division. After unveiling it at the 1980 Hanover Fair, Omnidata delivered the Omni/2, a general-purpose microcomputer also based on the TMS9900 processor, in December that year.

In April 1981, TA purchased the remaining shares in Omnidata, acquiring the company outright and making it a subsidiary of TA. TA had been purchased by Volkswagen AG earlier in 1980, making Omnidata for a brief period a second-order subsidiary of VW. As part of the acquisition, Van Alstyne was promoted to manager of TA's word processing division, directing the development of the Royal brand in the United States and the TA brand in Europe. TA under VW later absorbed Omnidata into their Royal Business Machines subsidiary in 1981.

In early January 1983, as part of VW's reorganization of Triumph-Adler, Omnidata was spun off into a separate company once again. Now on their own, Omnidata began developing the Omni Convertible, an ambitious 16-bit microcomputer that featured support for multiple differing microprocessor architectures running simultaneously. A Zilog Z80H located on its motherboard runs the built-in machine code monitor, while co-processors occupy their own dedicated Multibus card, slotting into one of the four available 16-bit Multibus ports on the Convertible's motherboard. Unveiled at the 1983 CES in November and released to the general public in January 1984, the Omni Convertible came stock with one co-processor card containing Texas Instruments' TMS9995. This card was responsible for running Omnidata's proprietary word processing software suite, Omnitext—on top of their proprietary disk operating system, Omni-DOS—as well as acting as a controller for the keyboard and serial and parallel ports. Optional co-processor cards included Intel's x86-based 80186 and 80286 and Motorola's 68000. While only up to three cards could be operated at the same time, this allowed users to run a combination of CP/M, Unix, MS-DOS, UCSD Pascal, Xenix, and Omni-DOS seamlessly and simultaneously.

Omnidata released no new computer systems after 1984 and let their trademark lapse in 1988.

== See also ==
- Challenger III by Ohio Scientific, a computer that had three processors: a 6502, a Z80, and a Motorola 6800
- Dimension 68000, another multiprocessor computer system that could support up to four different processors
