= Intertec Data Systems =

Defunct American computer company

Intertec Data Systems Corporation
- Company type: Public
- Industry: Computer
- Founded: 1973; 52 years ago in Columbia, South Carolina
- Founder: William Wells
- Defunct: 1991; 34 years ago
- Fate: Chapter 7 bankruptcy, Liquidation
- Products: Computer systems; Video terminals

Intertec Data Systems Corporation, later Wells American Corporation, was an American computer company active from 1973 to 1991 and based in Columbia, South Carolina.

== History ==
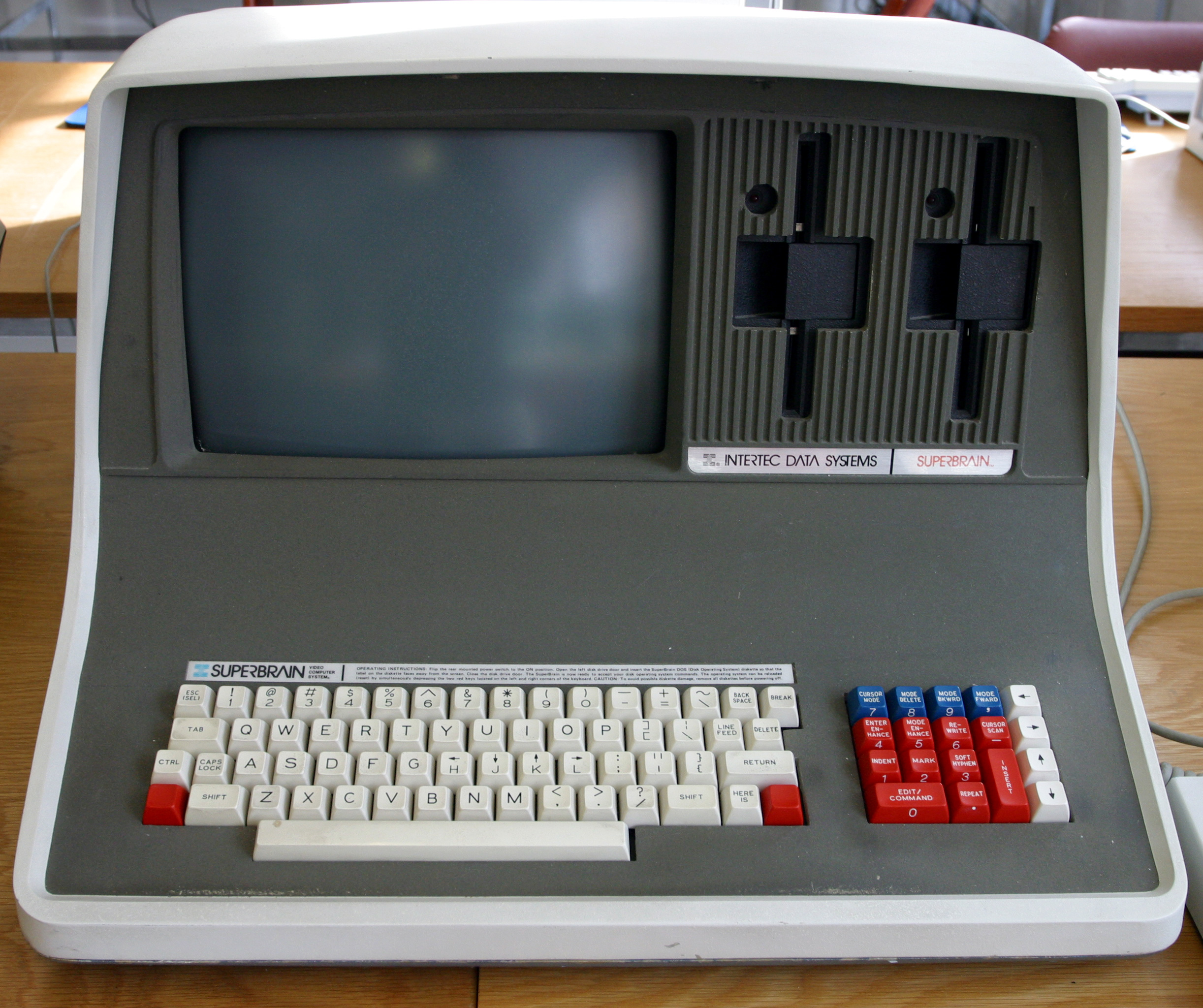
An Intertec Superbrain

Intertec was founded in Columbia, South Carolina, by William Wells, a former IBM researcher, to manufacture and market low-cost video terminals. In 1979, the company introduced the Superbrain, an all-in-one microcomputer based on the Zilog Z80 microprocessor and running CP/M. In 1980, Intertec introduced the CompuStar, a multiuser microcomputer housed in a more standard desktop form factor.

Both computers sold steadily well in the first two years, with the company earning $3.7 million on $17.2 million in sales by 1981. That year, the company filed its initial public offering. However, the company found itself unable to compete with IBM's Personal Computer introduced in 1981, a system which saw quick widespread adoption. In December 1983, they staged a comeback with the HeadStart, a semi-portable all-in-one featuring both the Intel 8086 of the IBM PC, allowing it to run "most" programs for the PC's DOS, and a Z80 microprocessor capable of running CP/M. The computer was not as IBM PC compatible as was advertised, however, and the product flopped. Massive layoffs within the company ensued, with the company only employing 12 by June 1985, down from a peak of 600 employees in 1983. In 1986, William Wells' younger brother Ron Wells took over the company and renamed it to Wells American. It pivoted to the production of true IBM PC compatibles, marketing the A-Star as one such example that year.

In 1988, Wells American introduced a new CompuStar that could take expansion cards of both the IBM PC and IBM's new Personal System/2 (PS/2). The expansion bus of the IBM PC was a mostly open standard known as the Industry Standard Architecture (ISA), while the PS/2's bus was based on IBM's Micro Channel architecture, a more locked-down, heavily patented architecture devised by IBM as an attempt to regain market share lost through the proliferation and commodification of IBM PC clones. The new CompuStar possessed both ISA and Micro Channel expansion slots.

The new CompuStar was not enough to reverse the company's fortunes, and in 1990 the company suspended all manufacturing activities and marketing in the United States. In 1991, the company filed for Chapter 7 bankruptcy and had its assets liquidated.
