= Applied Technology =

- Type: formerly: Public Company
- Industry: Computer hardware
- Founded: 1975
- Key people: Owen Hill (Founder)
- Products: MicroBee; Others..

Applied Technology was founded by Owen Hill in 1975 in Australia. He was a pioneer producer of home computers that ran CP/M on Zilog Z80 microprocessors. Their MicroBee computer (1982) was the first commercial personal computer manufactured in Australia. The computers were used by schools in Australia and Sweden and by BMW car dealers in Australia.

It was later known as Microbee Systems, Microworld and Honeysoft.

Some models of mid-1980s are Applied Technology S100, Micro Bee 32IC, Micro Bee 128K, "Computer in a Book" and the 256TC.
