= Visual Technology, Inc. =

American computer company

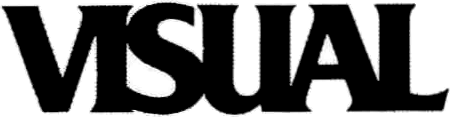
- Type: Public
- Industry: Computer
- Founded: 1978; 48 years ago in Tewksbury, Massachusetts
- Founder: Tom Foley (principal)
- Defunct: September 1993; 33 years ago
- Fate: Acquired by White Pine Software
- Products: Data terminals; Portable computers

Visual Technology, Inc., was an American computer company active from 1978 to 1993 and based in Middlesex County, Massachusetts. It produced a wide variety of smart terminals compatible with a wide variety of terminal protocols—mostly those of Digital Equipment Corporation (DEC)—as well as selling terminals with their own bespoke standards. Toward the end of its existence, it focused on the production of X terminals. In 1993, Visual Technology was acquired by White Pine Software.

== History ==
=== Foundation (1978–1981) ===
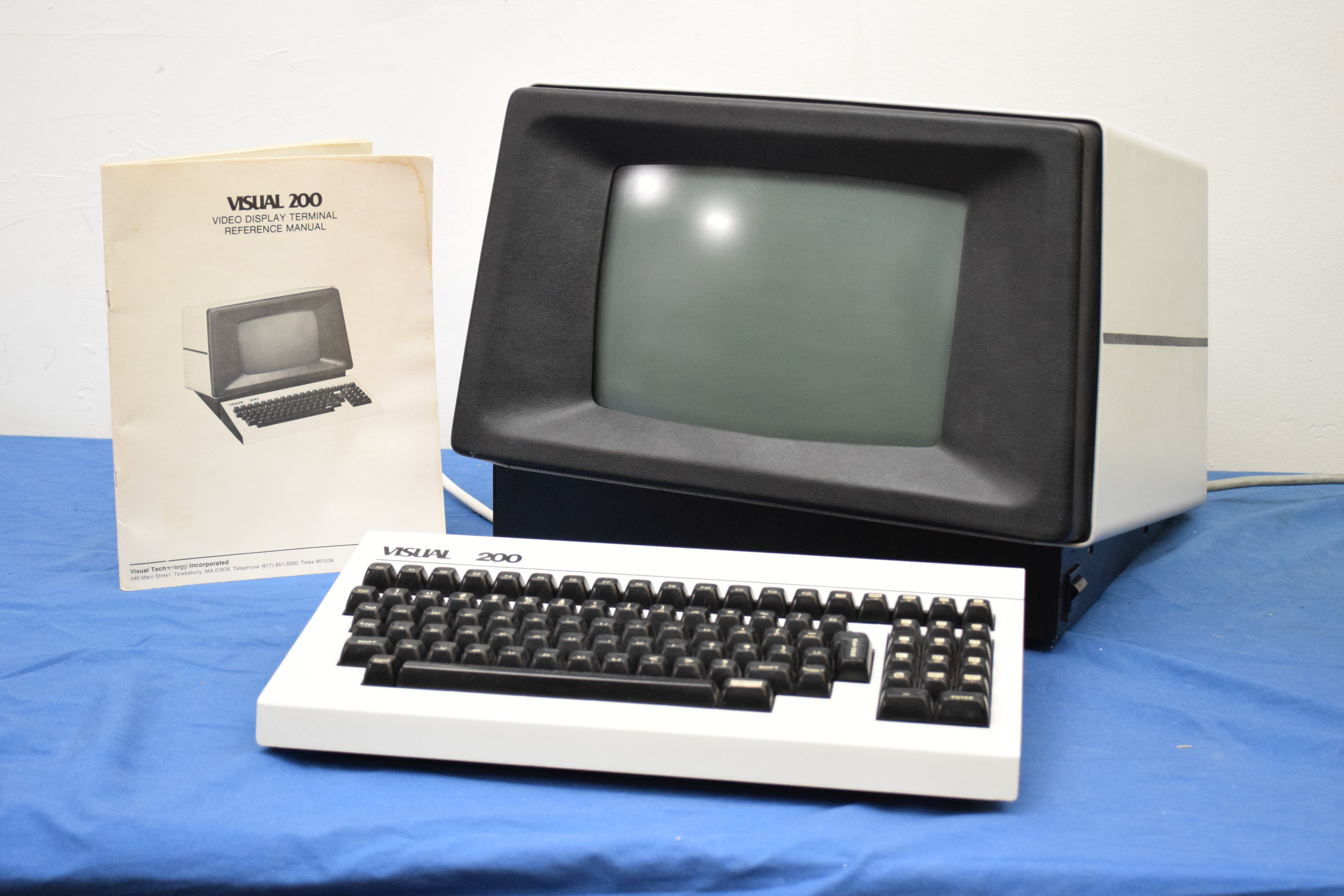
Visual 200, data terminal from 1979

Visual Technology, Inc., was founded in 1978 in Tewksbury, Massachusetts, by Tom Foley and three others. Foley, the company's principal founder, had worked as an engineer of computer terminal at various electronics companies, since around 1969. Foley founded Visual Technology in a dilapidated mill in Tewksbury, raising US$600 thousand in venture capital to renovate the mill and deliver the prototype for its first terminals—the Visual 200 and 210—which they accomplished in mid-1979. In the same year, the company received their first order from a nearby Middlesex County company worth $7 million. They raised another $400 million from their investors in order to raise the manufacturing lines to fulfill this order.

The Visual 200 and 210 were smart terminals that could emulate a number of other terminals on the market through DIP switches on the units switching the protocol currently in use. The protocols supported were the Hazeltine 1500, the ADM-3A the DEC VT52, and ADDS 520. The 210 added support for block-mode transmission and a grid of 14 function keys that the end user could configure to any given key combination. Visual Technology generated $700 thousand in revenue from these terminals in their first year of operation. In 1980, they announced the Visual 400 and 100, respectively block-mode and non-block-mode terminals emulating the DEC VT100; and the Visual 110, which supported various Data General Dasher terminals. By 1981, they had delivered 9,000 units across all model lines. That year, sales more than doubled to 20,000 units, the company generating $2 million in profits on $18 million in revenue. In August that year, they filed their initial public offering, raising $5.5 million.

=== Success (1982–1984) ===
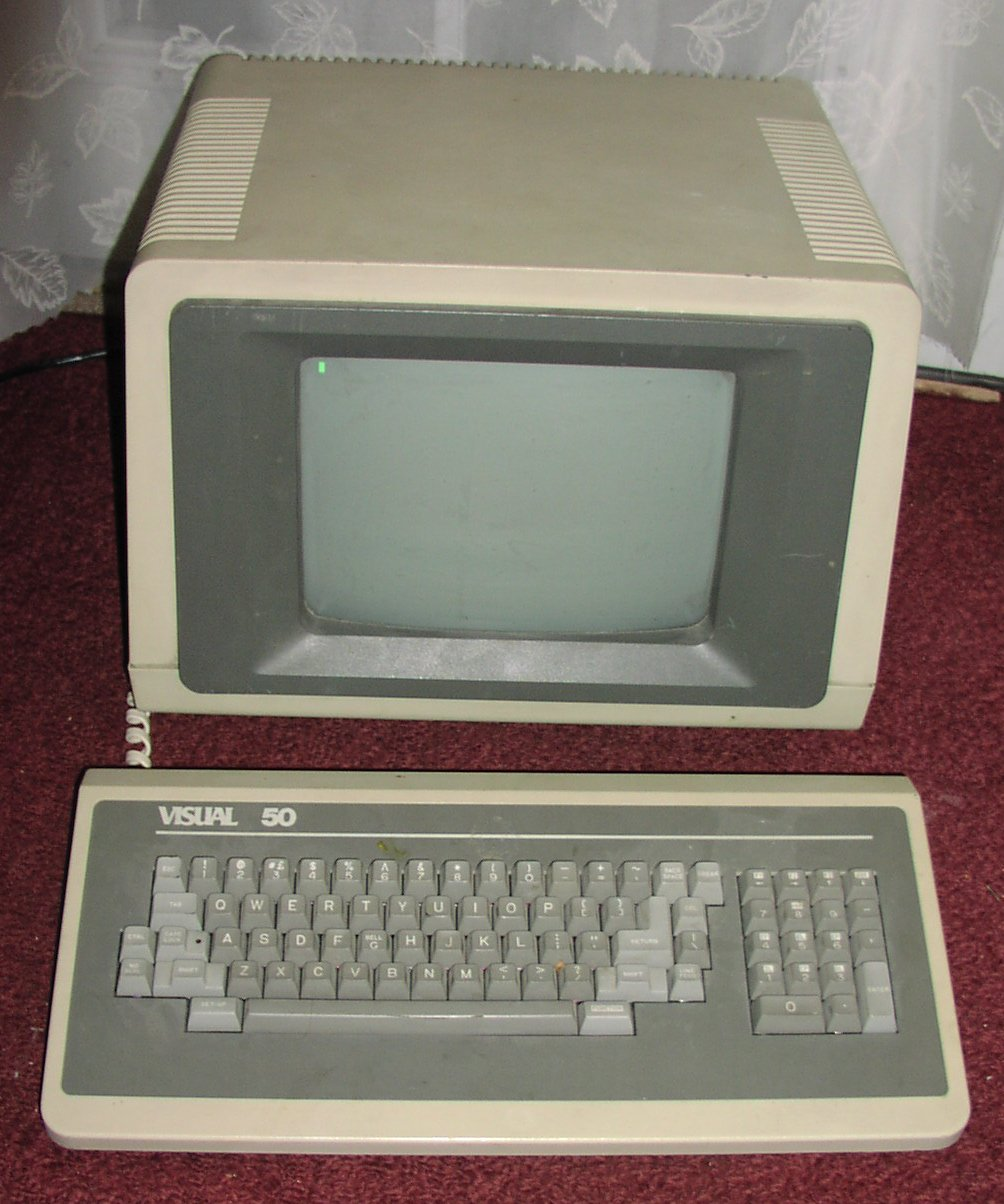
Visual 50, data terminal from 1983

By June 1982, the company had 250 workers on its payroll and gained Burroughs Corporation, a large mainframe company based in St. Louis, as a customer. That month, Visual Technology introduced the Visual 50 at the National Computer Conference in Houston. The Visual 50 was essentially a redesigned Visual 210 that spoke the same protocols as its predecessor, while adding support for ADDS' Viewpoint terminal and Hazeltine's Esprit line of terminals. It also added line and block graphics to its character set, the capability to locally edit data within fields, and provided smooth scrolling of data on-screen. The Visual 50 improved the ergonomics and lowered the weight of preceding Visual terminals by sporting a tilt-swivel display mount and a plastic chassis. In 1983, the company introduced their first computer system, the Visual 1050, based on a Zilog Z80 and running CP/M.

Between September 1982 and January 1983, Visual Technology acquired Ontel Corporation. Ontel was a struggling video terminal company founded in 1968 that had been acquired by Caesars World, a multifaceted hotel and casino operator, in 1976. Visual Technology spent $9.5 million on their acquisition of Ontel; following this, the company kept Ontel as a division, retaining around 195 of their 225 employees. Visual Technology's revenues rose to $50 million by mid-1983, this sharp increase attributed to this acquisition. In May 1983, they issued their second IPO, raising another $11.5 million.

=== Decline (1984–1988) ===
In November 1983, Visual Technology acquired Custom Computer Software of Wayland, Massachusetts, founded by Harlan La Vigne, a business associate of Foley. Custom Computer had been developing their first product, a briefcase-sized portable computer compatible with the IBM PC, called the Commuter. By mid-1984, Visual Technology had failed to secure major third-party distributors of the Commuter, and its poor sales caused the company to post its first significant quarterly losses in fall 1984. The company laid off 190 employees in the fallout of the botched launch of the Commuter. Lee Data Corporation of Eden Prairie, Minnesota, a competing terminal manufacturer, announced their intent to acquire Visual Technology in November 1983 for $16.1 million in a stock swap, wanting to keep Visual Technology as a subsidiary. The deal collapsed in January 1985, however, shortly before the final signatures were inked. Lee Data agreed to pay $3 million in cancellation fees and agreeing to acquiring some of Visual Technology's patents as a result of the merger breaking down. Lee Data ultimately acquired the patents and designs for Visual Technology's unrealized "supermicrocomputer" based on the Intel 80286. Lee Data finished developing the product and marketed it as System 2000 in 1985.

Lee Data's investment, as well as another wave of layoffs, allowed Visual Technology to exit bankruptcy. By this point, Wyse Technology had taken over a significant percentage of the company's market share in the data terminal segment. In early 1986, Visual Technology called in Hambrecht & Quist to stage a turnaround of the company. The latter invested $12 million in the company and attempted to find a market for the Commuter line, but they found the portable computer market too competitive, and in February 1986, the Commuter was finally cancelled.

=== Pivot and acquisition (1988–1993) ===
Between 1986 and 1988, Visual Technology remained in the red. With the rise of the X terminal concept in the late 1980s, Visual Technology introduced a number of compatible terminals, starting with the X Display Station in summer 1988. In August 1989, Hambrecht & Quist poured another $5 million into Visual Technology, contingent of the company ditching the remnants of their legacy DEC and IBM-compatible terminal lines. In October 1989, Visual Technology filed for Chapter 11 bankruptcy amid H&Q's reorganization of the company—meanwhile, the company continued to sell models in the X Display Station range. The pivot to X Terminals was a success for Visual Technology, the company able to carve a niche in this segment alongside competitors such as HP and Network Computing Devices. In September 1993, Visual Technology was acquired by White Pine Software of Nashua, New Hampshire, for an undisclosed amount.
