= MicroBee =

Series of networkable home computers

- Developer: Applied Technology
- Type: Home computers
- Released: February 1982; 44 years ago
- Introductory price: A$399 in Kit Form
- Discontinued: 1990; 36 years ago
- Operating system: MicroWorld BASIC; DGOS (David Griffiths Operating System)
- CPU: Zilog Z80 @ 2 MHz
- Memory: 16 or 32 KB
- Graphics: Synertek 6545 CRT controller for 64 × 16 characters (512 × 256 pixels)
- Sound: Monotonic sound generator & speaker, 2 octaves

MicroBee (or Micro Bee) was a series of networkable home computers by Applied Technology, which became publicly listed company MicroBee Systems Limited soon after its release. The original MicroBee computer was designed in Australia by a team including Owen Hill and Matthew Starr.

The MicroBee's most distinctive features are its user configurable video display (capable of mimicking the displays of other computers and devices including the TRS-80, Sorcerer and SOL20 with later colour and graphic models 40 and 80 column terminals, Super-80, ZX Spectrum, early arcade machines, Amstrad CPC 464) and its battery backed non-volatile RAM and small size allowing it to be powered off, transported, and powered back on and resume activities on the currently loaded program or document.

It was originally packaged as a two board unit with the lower "baseboard" containing all components except the system memory which was mounted on the upper "core board".

== Components ==
The original main board consisted of:

- Z80 CPU
- Z80 PIO
- 6545 CRT controller
- 2 KB screen RAM
- 2 KB character ROM (128 characters)
- 2 KB programmable character graphics (PCG) RAM (128 characters)
- Keyboard
- Speaker
- Tape input/output
- Video out
- Serial port
- User parallel port
- Power connector

The original coreboards consisted of:

- Either 32KB capacity or 56KB capacity 6116 battery backed Non-volatile RAM
- Either 16KB BASIC ROM or 4KB BOOT ROM
- 50 way System Expansion port
- Provision for 8KB Expansion ROM on 32KB Max capacity version

A floppy disk drive unit and S-100 bus expansion unit were available. They connected to a MicroBee by a 50 way ribbon cable to the System Expansion port.

The MicroBee had two networking options – BeeNet and StarNet. The BeeNet was a low cost low speed LAN (Local Area Network) for 16–32K ROM Models and the StarNet was for the 64K and larger DRAM models.

The BeeNet uses a bus topology that uses synchronous serial transfers. The StarNet uses a single star topology using dedicated 8-bit parallel data bus connections between the central hub and its remote spokes.

== Ancestry ==
The MicroBee was the integration, simplification and modernisation of the following S-100 cards sold by Applied Technology, Microworld BASIC and DGOS Monitor for their System Z.A.T. chassis.

- DG680 CPU – Z80 Single board Computer designed by David Griffiths
- MW640/DG640 VDU – Visual Display Unit designed by David Griffiths. (The DG640 VDU was itself was based upon the Processor Technology VDM-1.)
- TCT-PCG – Programmable Character Generator for the DG640 VDU designed by Craig Barratt
- MW864 – MEGAMEMORY 64K Static RAM Memory board designed by Owen Hill
- MW2516 – 16K ROM 16K ROM Card designed by Owen Hill
- MW6545 – User Programmable VDU designed by John Wilmshurst

The removal of the S-100 bus support and configuration hardware and some other features made the MicroBee much simpler and cheaper than its ancestors.

Examples:

1. The VDU Attribute RAM of the DG640 VDU was not employed in the original MicroBee (but was reinstated in a modified and extended form for the Premium Series Microbee)
2. Z80 CTC (Counter Timer Counter)
3. Tape motor on/off control
4. 8-bit input sense port
5. Configuration DIP switches

The utilisation of higher density memory devices made also the MicroBee smaller. HM6116 (2K × 8 bit) were instead of the earlier 2101 (1K × 1 bit) and 2114 (1K × 4 bit) static RAMS and 2732 (4K × 8 bit) ROMs instead of 2516 (2K × 8) ROMs as program ROM. Subsequent models used the even denser HM6264 (8K × 8 bit) static RAMs, 4164 (64K x 1 bit) dynamic RAM and 27128 (16K x 8 bit) 2764 (8K × 8) program ROMs.

== Kit beginnings ==
The computer was released as a kit, with assembly instructions included in Your Computer magazine, in February 1982. After a successful bid for the New South Wales Department of Education computer tender, the computer was repackaged in a two-tone beige and black case, and sold pre-built. The 16 KB ROM held the MicroWorld BASIC interpreter written by Matthew Starr and DGOS (David Griffiths Operating System) compatible System Monitor. In addition to the 16 KB ROM, there is additional ROM socket for optional programs such as WORDBEE (Word processor) or EDASM (a Z80 Editor/Assembler that was written by Ron Harris).

Original MicroBees ran at a clock speed of 2 MHz, with a video dot clock of 12 MHz, which was sufficient to display 64 × 16 characters (512 × 256 pixels) on a modified television or composite monitor. The original machines were supplied with 16 or 32 KB of static RAM, and stored programs on cassette, using 300 or 1200 Baud encoding.

== The IC model ==
The IC model was released in 1983, increasing the clock speed to 3.375 MHz, and allowing (through use of a 13.5 MHz video clock) display of 80 × 24 characters (640 × 264 pixels), again on a modified television or composite monitor. It also included a 4 KB "Telcom" terminal emulator ROM.

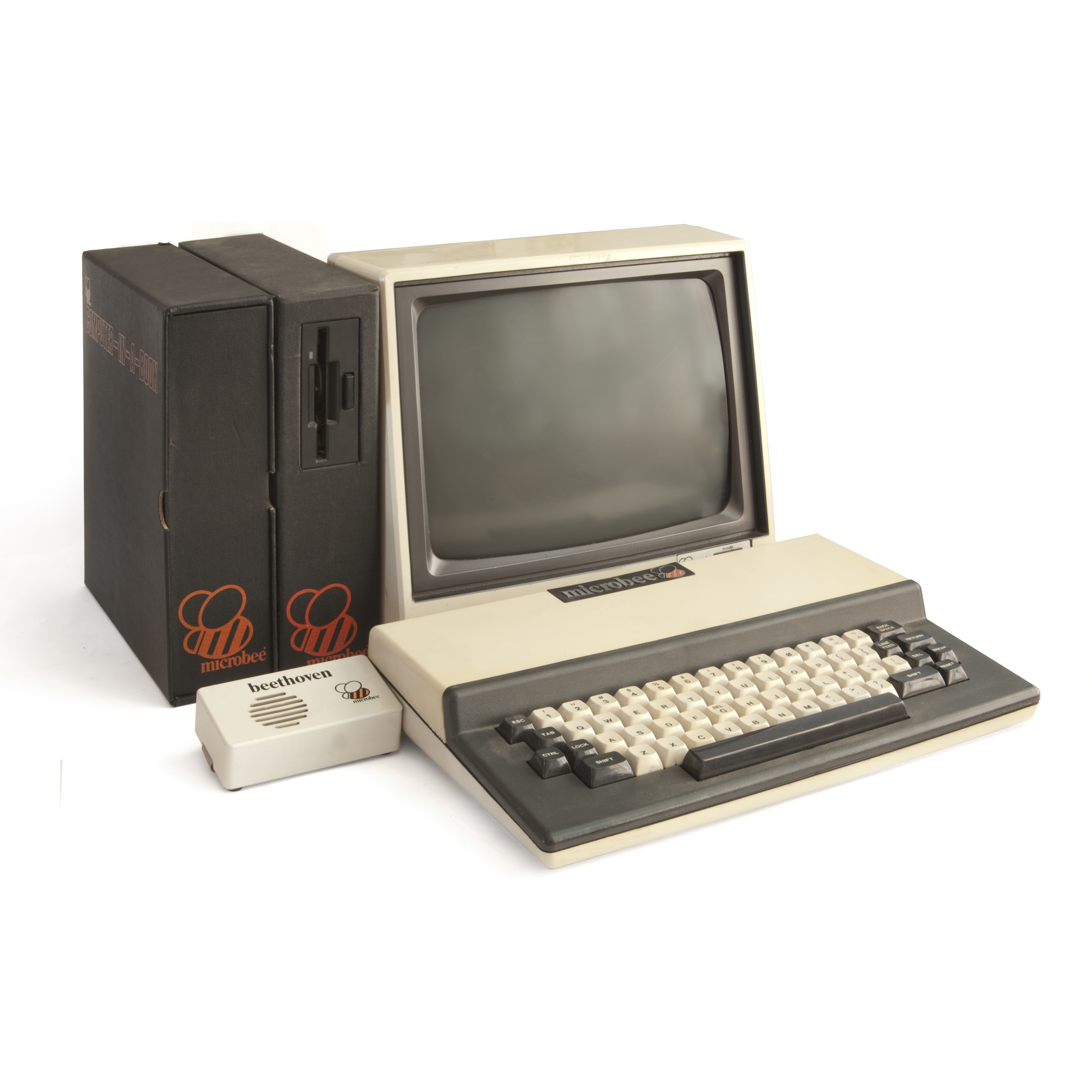
A complete MicroBee Computer-In-A-Book system

== Disk machines ==
A floppy disk based machine was also released in 1983. Early disk machines used 56 KB of static RAM, with a 4 KB BIOS ROM. They ran CP/M 2.2. The disk controller, based on the Western Digital WD1793 Floppy Disk Controller chip was contained in an add-on card that connected to the core board. The machine used 5.25" floppy disks.

Dynamic RAM disk machines with 64 or 128 KB RAM followed soon after, with a WD2793 Floppy Disk Controller incorporated on the core board. Later disk machines used 3.5" floppy disks.

== Colour ==
A colour machine was also released in 1983, called the "32K Personal Communicator". This added a second byte of RAM for each character position, allowing each character to have 2 colours. The foreground colour has 32 possible values (5 bits) and are determined by the contents of the 82S123 PROM located on the colour board. Not all foreground colours combinations are unique with only 27 being possible. The background colours were made up from the remaining 3 bits of the colour RAM byte (8 colours) and another 3 bits on a colour control port that controlled the RGB background intensity level. This allowed the intensity of each of the RGB colours to be set to full or half intensity but only 7 different values could be in effect at any one time and changing the intensity value would affect the entire display. The extra colour circuitry required an additional board mounted under the main board, with numerous messy connections to the main board.

The Premium, 256TC and Teleterm models released in 1986 incorporated colour on the main board and used a different colour design compared to the earlier model and was not compatible for the resultant colours that were produced but application and system software will work on either hardware designs. The later colour design was largely compatible with the Color Graphics Adapter used on the IBM PC where 4 bits were used for the foreground and another 4 bits for the background colours.

== The B-ETI Serial Terminal ==
The B-ETI was a Microbee-based serial terminal. It could emulate either an ADM-3A or Televideo 912 terminal. The display format was monochrome 80 × 24 and it supported communication at either 300 or 1200 baud. An advertisement for a "special introductory offer" with an asking price of A$275 appeared in the December 1983 issue of Electronics Today International magazine.

Introduction, BETI Users Guide:

The BETI was designed as a low cost serial terminal operating at speeds of up to 4800 baud (1200 baud without handshaking). The BETI also provides optional automatic code conversion to and from the baudot 5 level code used for RTTY and Telex applications.

Specifications:

- Codes supported: US ASCII and CCITT BAUDOT.
- Baud rates: 45.5, 50, 75, 110, 300, 600, 1200, 2400, 4800.
- Default settings: 4800 baud US ASCII full duplex.
- Emulation: ADM-3A and TVI 912C (except for attributes).
- RS232 port: Configured as DTE with 0-12V swing.
- Parallel port: Connects to Centronics printer with adapter.
- Internal buffer: 1800 bytes.
- Power supply read: 9–12 V at 800 mA.
- Video output: Composite video: negative sync, 1V p-p into 75 ohms, 50 Hz frame, 15625 Hz line frequency.
- Screen format: 80 characters by 24 for lines, 64 by 16 lines for setup mode.
- Attribute: Reverse video, enabled by escape sequence.
- Keyboard: Full size, 60-key QWERTY layout, positive travel. Two shot moulded key tops.
- Microprocessor: Z80A at 3.375 MHz.
- Control program: 4k 2532 EPROM.
- Sound generation: Built in loudspeaker for BELL.
- Case: 342mm W × 239mm D × 42mm H. Injection moulded ABS.

== The Premium Series MicroBee ==
In 1985, a new mainboard was introduced. The resulting machine was called the "Premium Series" model. The new mainboard had 8 KB of screen RAM, 8 KB of "attribute" RAM (raising the possible number of PCG characters to 32 768), 8 KB of colour RAM, and up to 32 KB (16 KB installed) of PCG RAM. 16 KB PCG RAM was sufficient to allow full 512 × 256 bit mapped displays with a limited colour palette. These machines were typically sold with dual-floppy drives (or a 10 MB 'Winchester' disc) held in a monitor stand that connected to the main unit.

== Physical coding for tape storage ==
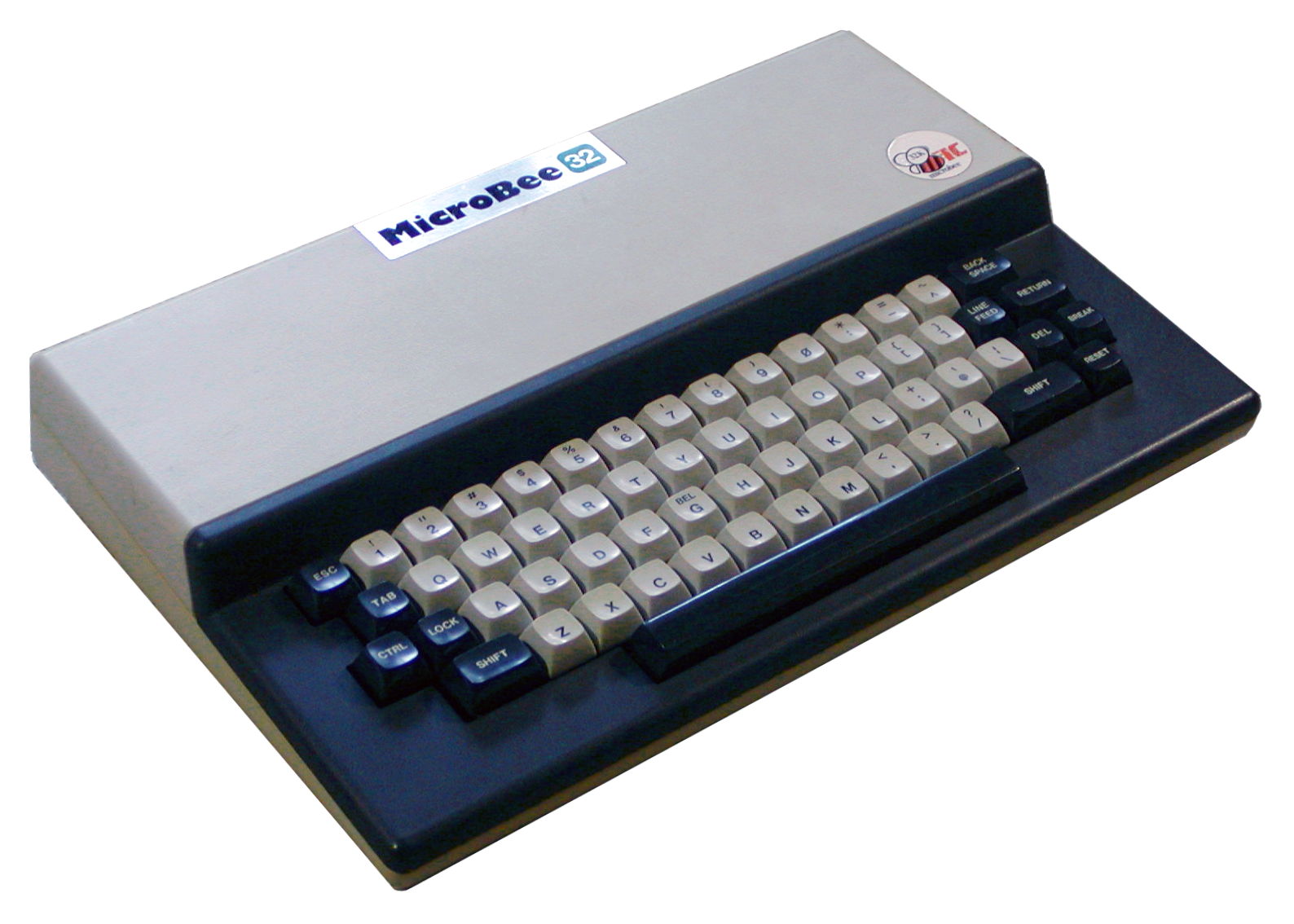
Microbee 32K IC

Standard MicroBee Tapes are encoded at 300 or 1200 baud using its own variation of Processor Technology's SOLOS/CUTER Tape protocol that consists of a 300 baud metadata header followed by data payload blocks encoded at the desired transfer rate using CUTS (Computer Users Tape System).

The wav2dat software converts audio data into Microbee files.

== Books ==
A few books were written about the MicroBee, including:

- Wildcards – By Robert Alan Burt, Peter Terence Ford, and Ash Nallawalla
- Wildcards 2 – By Robert Alan Burt, Peter Terence Ford, and Ash Nallawalla
- Wildcards 3 – By Robert Alan Burt, Peter Terence Ford, and Ash Nallawalla
- Wildcards 4 – By Robert Alan Burt, Peter Terence Ford, and Ash Nallawalla
- Getting started on your MicroBee – By Petr Lukes and Tim Hartnell
- Shake hands with the Microbee – By Pam Kelly-Hartley, Joy McKneil and Tony Melius
- The Penguin book of Microbee games – By David Johns and edited by Tim Hartnell
- The Winners – compiled by the Sydney Microbee User's Group

== Games ==
There are 137 commercially released games for the MicroBee.

| Title | Year | Publisher |
|---|---|---|
| 3 Golf Games | | Honeysoft |
| Adventure in 3D | | Honeysoft |
| Adventureland | 1982 | Adventure International |
| Agatha's Folly Part One | 1989 | Adventure Workshop |
| Agatha's Folly Part Two | 1989 | Adventure Workshop |
| Air Track | | Honeysoft |
| Alien Cresta | 1981 | Dubois & McNamara Soft. |
| Amazon Search | 1984 | Honeysoft |
| Apple Panic | 1982 | Funsoft |
| Arcade Games Vol.1 | | Honeysoft |
| Arcade Games Vol.2 | | Honeysoft |
| Arcade Games Vol.3 | | Honeysoft |
| Arcade Games Vol.4 | | Honeysoft |
| Asteroids Plus | | Mytek Computing |
| Australia 2020 | 1987 | Monash University |
| Australian Economy | | Honeysoft |
| Baboon | 1984 | Honeysoft |
| Baby Bouncer | 1986 | Honeysoft |
| Backgammon | | Mytek Computing |
| Battle Station | 1981 | Dubois & McNamara Soft. |
| Battleship | 1983 | Dreamcards |
| Battleships | | Goodison Soft. |
| Bee Casino | | Honeysoft |
| Bee Pac | | Beesoft |
| Bee Trek | | Beesoft |
| BeeBall | | System Software |
| BeeBomb | | System Software |
| Binkie the Droid | 1988 | Kerwin Soft. |
| Buckaroo Banzia | 1984 | Adventure International |
| Building of Fear | 1984 | Dreamcards |
| Bunyip Adventure | 1984 | Grotnik Soft. |
| Bushwalking Adventure | 1984 | Dreamcards |
| Cannibals and Missionaries | | Honeysoft |
| Capture | 1983 | Honeysoft |
| Cave Escape + Mystery of the Pyramid | | Honeysoft |
| Cave Hunt | 1984 | Honeysoft |
| Caverns | | Dreamcards |
| Centipede Attack | 1981 | Dubois & McNamara Soft. |
| Chase Plus | 1982 | Applied Technology |
| Chilly Willy | 1984 | Honeysoft |
| Chopper | 1983 | Mytek Computing |
| Chopper Pilot | 1984 | Honeysoft |
| Cloze Exercises | 1985 | Goodison Soft. |
| Crossword Capers | 1984 | Goodison Soft. |
| Defender | 1983 | Mytek Computing |
| Depth Charge | 1984 | Honeysoft |
| Destroyer | 1983 | Honeysoft |
| Dodgem | 1982 | Applied Technology |
| Dragon Slayer | | Honeysoft |
| Draughts Plus | 1984 | Honeysoft |
| Dungeons of Khan | 1983 | Honeysoft |
| Embassy Adventure | 1984 | Honeysoft |
| Emu Joust | 1983 | Honeysoft |
| Escape from Colditz P | 1985 | Honeysoft |
| Eureka | 1984 | Honeysoft |
| Eye of Min | 1983 | Honeysoft |
| Fallout Zone | 1984 | Dreamcards |
| Family Favourites | | Honeysoft |
| Family Games Vol.1 | | Honeysoft |
| Fortris | | Superior Computer Soft. |
| Frogger | 1983 | Mytek Computing |
| Frogman | 1984 | Digital Concepts |
| Frontier Adventure | | Honeysoft |
| Galactic Defence | | System Software |
| Ghost Hunter | 1981 | Dubois & McNamara Soft. |
| Ghost Muncher + Kilopede | 1983 | Mytek Computing |
| Graphic Adventures 1 | | Honeysoft |
| Graphic Lander | 1983 | Honeysoft |
| Great Australian Car Rally | 1985 | Goodison Soft. |
| Gridfire | 1984 | Honeysoft |
| Grotnik Wars | 1984 | Grotnik Soft. |
| Hangman | 1983 | Dreamcards |
| Hoards of the Deep Realm | 1985 | Honeysoft |
| Honeysoft Microbee Adventures Vol. Three | | Honeysoft |
| Honeysoft Microbee Adventures Vol. Two | | Honeysoft |
| Honeysoft Microbee Text Adventures Vol. One | | Honeysoft |
| Hoppy | 1981 | Dubois & McNamara Soft. |
| House of Frankenstein | | Applied Technology |
| Hustle P | 1983 | Honeysoft |
| Island Adventure Part One | 1985 | Honeysoft |
| Island Adventure Part Two | 1985 | Honeysoft |
| Joystick Games 1 | | Honeysoft |
| Joysub + Justle | 1983 | Honeysoft |
| Jungle Raiders | 1981 | Dubois & McNamara Soft. |
| Kids Pack | | Honeysoft |
| Kids Pack 1 | | Honeysoft |
| Kids Pack 2 | | Honeysoft |
| Killer Bees | 1983 | Dreamcards |
| Killer Beetles | 1981 | Dubois & McNamara Soft. |
| Kilopede | 1983 | Mytek Computing |
| King Kong | 1983 | Mytek Computing |
| Lazer Blazer | 1984 | Honeysoft |
| Let's Go Punting | 1986 | Goodison Soft. |
| Lucky Bar Poker Machine | 1983 | Microworld Australia |
| Magic Ring of Targon + Rescue the Prince of Targon | | Honeysoft |
| Maths Adventure | 1982 | Applied Technology |
| Merlin Adventure | 1983 | Dreamcards |
| Meteor Rescue | | Mytek Computing |
| Micro Defender | 1983 | Honeysoft |
| Mine Drop II | 1983 | Dreamcards |
| Munch | 1983 | Mytek Computing |
| Museum Mystery | 1984 | Honeysoft |
| Nanoc the Destroyer + Jumpman | | Superior Computer Soft. |
| Nanoc the Destroyer II + Freedom Fighter + Missile Dodger | | Superior Computer Soft. |
| Nanoc's Revenge | | Superior Computer Soft. |
| NIM | | Honeysoft |
| Our World | | Honeysoft |
| Penny Arcade | | Honeysoft |
| Planet X | 1984 | Honeysoft |
| Pogog Manor | 1984 | Honeysoft |
| Prospector | | Honeysoft |
| Pyramid of Doom | | Adventure International |
| Quest for Castle Eldritch | | Honeysoft |
| Ring of Doom | 1983 | Honeysoft |
| Ring of Doom (Ödesringen) | 1983 | Microworld |
| RobotMan | | Honeysoft |
| Rocket Raiders | | System Software |
| Sabre of Sultar | 1983 | Honeysoft |
| Savage Island Part One | | Adventure International |
| Savage Island Part Two | | Adventure International |
| Scrambler | 1982 | Honeysoft |
| Sea Battle | 1983 | Digital Concepts |
| Space Lanes | 1984 | Honeysoft |
| Space Patrol | 1983 | Digital Concepts |
| Star Striker | 1984 | Mytek Computing |
| Strategic Games 1 | | Honeysoft |
| Sword Quest | 1983 | Honeysoft |
| Sydney Approach | 1985 | Honeysoft |
| Target | 1980 | Applied Technology |
| Target + Ztrek | 1982 | Honeysoft |
| Temple of Azragor | 1983 | Honeysoft |
| The Mob from Evil | 1988 | Kerwin Soft. |
| Underworld of Kin | 1983 | Digital Concepts |
| Valley + Caves | 1983 | Honeysoft |
| Video Maze | | Honeysoft |
| Word Puzzles | | Education Department of Western Australia |
| Wumpus | 1982 | Honeysoft |

== Final versions ==
The final version of the MicroBee, released in 1987, was the 256TC. This increased the memory to 256 KB of dynamic RAM and had a new keyboard with numeric keypad. The computer had a built in 3.5" floppy disk drive supporting both 800 KB (DSDD) and 400 KB (SSDD) formats. Bundled software included "Videotex" (a videotex terminal program), "Simply Write" (a word processor) and "Telcom" (a serial terminal emulator program).

MicroBee Systems also designed and manufactured a PC clone with an additional Z80 CPU, fitting both CPUs in an existing Microbee case. Called the "Matilda", or 640TC, it ran a NEC V40 (see NEC V20 chip) in PC mode, or a NSC800/Z80 CPU in Microbee 256TC mode. It used the Microsoft DOS version 4.01 Operating System with GW-BASIC when running in PC compatible mode, and the MicroBee CP/M version 2.2 Operating System in Microbee 256TC mode. The Microbee Matilda was launched on Tuesday 11 September 1990.

An advanced next generation model code named "Gamma", based on the Motorola 68010 and two Zilog Z80 processors, was designed but never made it to the market.

In 1992, after having undergone a number of ownership changes, the company ceased trading.. 70,000 machines had been produced.

== Legacy ==
After almost 20 years, the Microbee brand was re-launched in 2012 by Microbee Technology Pty Ltd, run by a Microbee employee from the 1980s, Ewan Wordsworth. The company produced a limited edition (100 unit only) kit, the Premium Plus. The new version was still Z80-based and followed the original two-board design. It had dual-processor architecture, with some enhancements such as floppy emulation of the SD memory card.

=== In popular culture ===
In the 2015 parody movie Kung Fury, Hackerman is hacking the timeline with MicroBee computers (along with a ZX Spectrum and a Power Glove) and Kung Fury himself also rides in the cyberspace on a MicroBee.
