= Aster CT-80 =

1982 personal computer

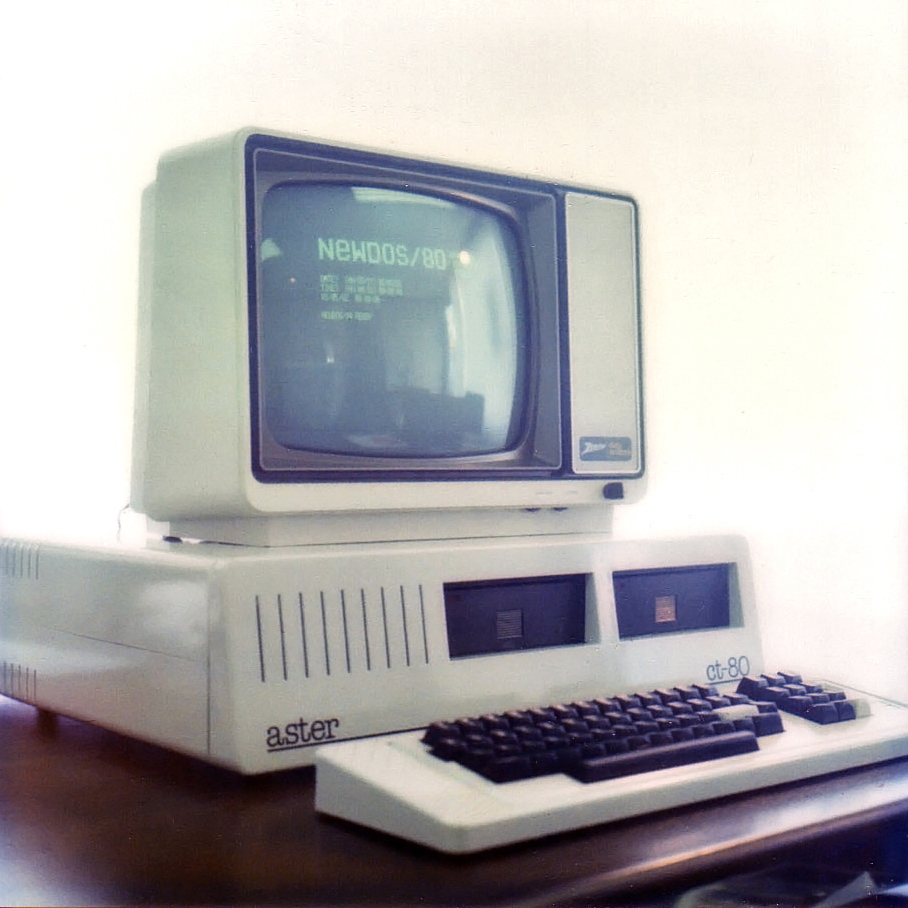
- The first kit version running Newdos/80. The 64x16 TRS-80 mode uses only a portion of the monitor, because the letters are the same size as the 80×25 CP/M screen. It was fixed with the redesign to a commercial product.
- Manufacturer: MCP / Aster Computers
- Type: Home computer
- Released: June 1982
- Operating system: TRS-DOS, CP/M
- CPU: Zilog Z80 @ 4
- Memory: 64 KB
- Removable storage: floppy discs, cassette
- Display: 128 x 48 black and white graphics; 32 x 16, 64 x 16 and 80 x 25 characters black and white text; (256 x 192 in 16 colors graphics with optional TMS9918, 640 x 288, black and white graphics with optional NEC μPD7220)
- Graphics: (optional TMS9918 or NEC μPD7220)
- Sound: Beeper

The Aster CT-80 is a 1982 personal computer developed by the small Dutch company MCP (later renamed to Aster Computers), was sold in its first incarnation as a kit for hobbyists. Later it was sold ready to use. It consisted of several Eurocard PCB's with DIN 41612 connectors, and a backplane all based on a 19-inch rack configuration. It was the first commercially available Dutch personal/home computer. The Aster computer could use the software written for the popular Tandy TRS-80 computer while fixing many of the problems of that computer, but it could also run CP/M software, with a large amount of free memory Transient Program Area, (TPA) and a full 80×25 display, and it could be used as a Videotext terminal. Although the Aster was a clone of the TRS-80 Model I it was in fact more compatible with the TRS-80 Model III and ran all the software of these systems including games. It also had a built-in speaker which was compatible with such games software.

== Models ==
Three models were sold. The first model (launched June 1982) looked like the IBM PC, a rectangular base unit with two floppy drives on the front, and a monitor on top with a separate detachable keyboard. The second incarnation was a much smaller unit the width of two 5 1/4" floppy drives stacked on top of each other, and the third incarnation looked like a flattened Apple with a built-in keyboard.

All units ran much faster than the original TRS-80, at 4 MHz, (with a software selectable throttle to the original speed for compatibility purposes) and the display supported upper and lower case, hardware snow suppression (video ram bus arbitration logic), and an improved character font set. The floppy disk interface supported dual density, and disk capacities up to 800 KB, more than four times the capacity of the original TRS-80. A special version of NewDos/80, (an improved TRS-DOS compatible Disk operating system) was used to support these disk capacities when using the TRS-80 compatibility mode.

For the educational market a version of the first model was produced with a new plastic enclosure (the First Asters had an all-metal enclosure) that also had an opening on the top in which a cassette recorder could be placed. This model was used in a cluster with one Aster (with disk drives) for the teacher, and eight disk less versions for the pupils. The pupils could download software from the teachers computer through a network based on a fast serial connection, as well as sending back their work to the teachers computer. There was also hardware in place through which the teacher could see the display of each pupils screen on his own monitor.

== Working modes ==
The Aster used 64 KB of RAM and had the unique feature of supporting two fundamentally different internal architectures: when turned on without a boot floppy or with a TRS-DOS floppy, the Aster would be fully TRS-80 compatible, with 48 KB of RAM. When the boot loader detected a CP/M floppy, the Aster would reconfigure its internal memory architecture on the fly to optimally support CP/M with 60 KB free RAM for programs (TPA) and an 80 x 25 display. This dual-architecture capability only existed on one other TRS-80 clone, the LOBO Max-80.

With a special configuration tool, the CT-80 could reconfigure its floppy drivers to read and write the floppies of about 80 other CP/M systems.

A third mode was entered with a special boot floppy which turned the Aster into a Videotex terminal with a 40x25 display and a Videotex character set, The software used the built in RS-232 interface of the Aster to control a modem through which it could contact a Prestel service provider.

== Sales ==
Most Aster CT-80's (about 10 thousand of them) were sold to schools for computer education, in a project first known as the "honderd scholen project" (one hundred schools project), but which later involved many more than just one hundred schools. MCP received this order from the Dutch government because their computer met all the technical and other demands, including the demand that the computers should be of Dutch origin and should be built in the Netherlands. Another important demand was that the computers could be used in a network (Aster developed special software and hardware for that). Later however the Government turned around and gave 50% of the order to Philips and their P2000 homecomputer even though the P2000 did not meet all the technical demands, was made in Austria and did not have network hardware nor software.

== Company ==
Aster computers was based in the small town of Arkel near the town of Gorinchem. Initially Aster computer b.v. was called MCP (Music print Computer Product), because it was specialized in producing computer assisted printing of sheet music. The director of the company was interested in Microprocessor technology and noticed there was a market for selling kits to computer building amateurs, so they started selling electronic kits to hobbyists, and employed four persons at that time . They also assembled kits for people without soldering skills, especially the "junior Computer" from Elektor (a copy of the KIM-1), and the ZX80 from Sinclair. Among the kits sold there were also alternative floppy disk drives for TRS-80 computers. But these needed the infamous TRS-80 expansion interface, which was very expensive, and had a very unreliable floppy disk controller because it used the WD1771 floppy disk controller chip without an external "data separator". To fix this problem MCP developed a small plugin board which could be plugged into the socket for the WD1771, and which contained a data separator, and a socket for the WD1791 to support dual-density operation. Still, the expansion interface was expensive and due to its design it was also unreliable. So they decided to also develop their own alternative in the form of an improved floppy disk controller and printer interface that could be built right into a floppy disk enclosure. The lack of RAM expansion offered by this solution was solved by a service in which the 16 KB RAM chips inside the base unit would be replaced by 64 KB RAM chips. While this went on MCP renamed itself to MCP CHIP but ran into problems with the German computer magazine CHIP, and had to return to its former name. At that time MCP did also sell imported home computers like the TRS-80, the Video Genie (another TRS-80 clone), the Luxor ABC 80 and the Apple II. They also sold the exotic Olivetti M20, a very early 16-bit personal computer that was one of the very few systems to use a Z8000 CPU.

After designing their own fully functional replacement for the TRS-80 expansion interface (which was never commercialized) the company realized that they could do better than just re-designing the expansion interface. They observed that the TRS-80 was a great computer but it lacked in several areas. The display logic and resulting display 'snow' was irritating, as was the missing lower case support, the CPU speed could be improved, the quality and layout of the keyboard was bothersome, and the floppy disk capacity and reliability was low. Also the more interesting software offered for CP/M systems could not run well on a TRS-80. So they decided to design a TRS-80 and CP/M software-compatible computer system, which (following the lead of Apple Computer) they decided to name after a "typical Dutch flower". So they called it the Aster CT-80 (CP/M/Tandy-1980). Why they went with Aster, and not the more well known Tulip is unknown, perhaps they thought it would be to presumptuous, or perhaps the fact that "Aster" is also a Dutch girls' name has something to do with it. Remarkably "Aster" was also the name given to a Dutch Supercomputer much later, in 2002.

The first version of the Aster consisted of four "Eurocards", one Z80 CPU card with 64 KB memory, one Motorola MC6845-based video card, one double density floppy disk controller card and one "keyboard/RS-232/cassette interface" card. Plus a "backplane card", (which connected all the other cards) and a keyboard. And was intended for hobbyists, to be sold as a kit consisting of the parts and the PCB's for the computer and attached keyboard. After selling a few kits, MCP became convinced there was a much bigger market for an improved model sold as a completed working system. However the original kit version lacked many features that prevented its use as a serious computer system. Because the original designer had left the company another employee completely redesigned most of the system, (adding a display snow remover circuit, true 80/64 column text mode support, (with different size letters for TRS-80 and CP/M mode, so that in TRS-80 mode the full screen was also used, not just a 64×16 portion of the 80×25 screen) with an improved font set (adding "gray scale" version of the TRS-80 mozaik graphics and many special PETSCII like characters), and a more flexible and reliable floppy disk controller and keyboard interface plus many other small improvements), also an enclosure was developed for the main computer system, (in the form of a 19-inch rack for the Eurocards) and for two floppy disk drives and the power supply. A software engineer was hired to write the special "dual boot mode" BIOS and the special CP/M BIOS. The "dual boot mode" BIOS actually discovered whether a TRS-DOS, or Aster CP/M disk was placed in the drive, and would, depending on the type of disk, reorganise the internal memory architecture of the system, to either be 100% TRS-80 compatible or optimally support CP/M, with as much "workspace" as possible, and the 80×25 video mode. It also was responsible for switching to ROM BASIC when the system was turned on with the break key pressed, and later supported a primitive LAN system, using the RS-232 port with modified cabling. The very first of the ready made computers were sold with the "kit" versions of the euro cards, the version with redesigned cards came a month or so later.

Soon the little shop became much too small and they moved to a much larger factory building nearby (formerly a window glass factory), and started mass-producing the Aster for a period of a few years, in which time its staff grew twentyfold.

After the Aster having been a few years on the Market Tandy released its own improved model, the TRS-80 Model III computer which solved many of the same problems that the Aster also had solved, but the model 3 still did not fully support CP/M as the Aster did. In the meantime IBM had released its original IBM PC, which incidentally looked remarkably like the Asters base with floppy drives + separate keyboard set-up.

The Aster was chosen for Dutch schools by the Dutch ministry of education, in a set-up with eight disk-less Asters, and one Aster with high-capacity floppy drives all connected by a LAN based on the Aster's high-speed serial port hardware, and special cables that permitted that any single computer on the LAN could broadcast to all other computers. The floppy based system was operated by the teacher who could send programs from his floppy disk, and data, to the student's disk-less systems thanks to the special BIOS in those systems. The students could send programs and data back to the teacher through the same LAN, or could save to a cassette recorder built into the disk-less units. Through a special "video-switch" the teacher was also able to see a copy of each student's display on his own screen. About a thousand of such systems were sold for many hundreds of Dutch schools.

Because of cash flow problems (resulting from growing too fast, insufficient financial backing, technical problems, and a sudden problem with Z80 processor deliveries) the company suddenly folded even before it came to full fruition.

Perhaps the Aster computer inspired another Dutch computer firm to name their computer after another typical Dutch flower—the Tulip's Tulip System-1 which appeared about the same time Aster folded.

Most of the engineers who designed the hardware and software of the Aster went on to design hardware and software for the (then new) MSX system for a company called "Micro Technology b.v.".

== Unreleased add ons ==
To enhance and modernize the Aster CT-80 the company also designed three alternative video display adapters to supplement or replace the TRS-80 compatible video card, (due to the modular nature of the Aster it was simply a matter of changing the video card, and/or CPU card to upgrade the system):

- A very High resolution monochrome video card with blitter and hardware text line and arc drawing capability, was designed for CAD applications, based on the NEC μPD7220 chip designed for graphic terminals, but was also used by some personal computers like the DEC Rainbow, and notably also for the Tulip System I.
- A colour video card with sprite capability based on the same TMS9918 video chip as the TI-99/4 and MSX computers, designed for gaming, and more creative and colorful educational software. A working prototype of this card was finished.
- A replacement card for the original TRS-80 compatible video card, software compatible to the original one, but with added color and very high resolution capabilities. was also on the drawing board. Based on a newer, slightly more flexible, version of the Asters original Motorola MC6845 video chip, the Rockwell 6545, it worked by adding a new video mode, one with the ability to reprogram an extended, (2048 characters instead of 256 characters) version of the character set, supported by an extended character memory of the video card that did not use one (8 bit) byte per character, but an 11 bit "word", so it could address each one of the available 2048 unique programmable characters. This meant it could provide a separate programmable character for all of the 1024 (64x16) or 2000 (80x25) characters on the screen. By filling the character pointer memory with values from zero to 1999 this essentially turned the text mode display into a very high resolution graphics mode, with the "font memory", acting as the high resolution Raster graphics video memory. Because the characters were 8 x 12 pixels this meant that video resolutions of 512 x 192 pixels (in 64x16 character mode), or 640 x 300 pixels (in 80x25 character mode) were created, which was quite high for the time. The "double width" mode of the TRS-80 was also supported, so 256 x 192 pixels (in 32x16 character mode), or 320 x 300 pixels (in 40x25 character mode) were also possible. The video card also supported 16 foreground and 16 background colors per character, by providing one byte per character position (2K) of "color ram". One nibble of such a byte then controlled the foreground color, and the other nibble controlled the background color, a system very similar to the ZX Spectrum, in fact in the 256x192 mode the display mode was virtually identical to the video of the ZX Spectrum. The color memory was also available in the "normal" TRS-80 and CP/M text modes, which meant that existing TRS-80 and CP/M software could be easily modified to add color. This video card would also support fast scrolling of high resolution color screens for games, because it had the indirection of the character pointers, so it was possible to quickly scroll the high resolution display, (or use other effects) by simply manipulating the 1920/1024 bytes of text video instead of the 24,576 bytes of high-resolution video memory.

A hard disk interface was also in the works, which would, add a SCSI interface, and the necessary software. A working prototype was developed that added a 40MB hard disk.

On the software front, work was being done to implement the replacement for the aging "user interface" of CP/M, (the Command Console Processor CCP) with the more modern ZCPR.

Finally a replacement for the aging Z80 processor was being developed in the form of an Intel 8086 board, and additional 512K 16 bit memory boards. Such replacements of CPU and memory system components were possible because the Aster CT-80 was designed to use a backplane that was designed to support both 8 and 16 bit processors, and used a modular Eurocard based design with slots to spare for expansion. In theory the system could support the Z80 and the 8086 simultaneously. Plans were formulated to support CP/M-86 and even MS-DOS.

None of these extensions to the system became available because the company folded before any of them could be released.
