= Action Computer Enterprise =

Former American computer company (1978–1990)

Action Computer Enterprise, Inc.
- Type: Private
- Industry: Computer
- Founded: 1978; 48 years ago in Pasadena, California
- Founders: Herbert L. Siegel; Kwok M. Ong; Wing Chung
- Defunct: 1990; 36 years ago
- Fate: Dissolution
- Products: Discovery 500; Discovery 1600
- Number of employees: 50 (1984)

Action Computer Enterprise, Inc. (ACE), was an American computer company that was active from 1978 to 1990. The company delivered one of the first multi-user-capable microcomputers, the Discovery 1600, in 1978. It was founded in Pasadena, California, by Herbert L. Siegel, Kwok M. Ong, and Wing Chung.

== History ==
=== Foundation (1978–1979) ===
Action Computer Enterprise was co-founded by four friends, including Herbert L. Siegel (February 27, 1938 – August 16, 2016), Kwok M. Ong, and Wing Chung. Ong, Siegel and the fourth founder had met during their employment at Jet Propulsion Laboratory (JPL) in California, while Chung and Ong had met at their alma mater of University of California, Berkeley. Long before starting ACE, Siegel had served in the Peace Corps, teaching in Ethiopia with his wife for two years in the 1960s before returning to the United States to obtain an M.A. in mathematics at UC Berkeley. After graduation, he worked as a programmer for JPL, the Los Angeles County Registrar-Recorder, and the Los Angeles County General, developing navigation strategies for JPL and their contract for the Voyager program; voter tracking systems for the Registrar-Recorder; and patient identification systems for the County General. Chung meanwhile was an immigrant who lived in Hong Kong post–World War II before moving to the United States to graduate from UC Berkeley and later Columbia University with degrees in mathematics, his master's degree at the latter university sponsored by the IBM Watson Fellowship. Chung moved to New Jersey to work for Roche before convincing his family to invest $50,000 in Action Computer Enterprise, his startup co-founded in 1978 with Siegel and company.

ACE was founded in one of the founder's home garages in Pasadena, California. It soon occupied an office in the city, growing to a staff of 30 in the early 1980s. Siegel was named chairman, while Chung was named vice president of ACE. The company's early days were spent developing what Chung later claimed to be the first multi-user microcomputer on the market. The company branded this computer as the Discovery 1600 and first released it in April 1979.

=== Discovery 1600 and Discovery 500 (1979–1983) ===
The Discovery 1600 was an SBC-based microcomputer based on an IEEE-696-compliant S-100-bus backplane. The system could carry one service processor card and up to fifteen user processor cards on its bus, with room to spare for S-100 peripheral cards (so long as they could support port-mapped I/O). The service processor acts as a controller for the S-100 bus and floppy and hard disk drives. User processor cards, on the other hand, provide the means of interaction and multi-user capability, through the use of video terminals plugged into each of their serial ports. Depending on the type of user processor card (variants described below), either vanilla CP/M or CP/M-86 can be run as an independent operating system on each user processor. The assignment of operating systems to each user card was facilitated by Discovery's custom DPOS (Distributed Processing Operating System).

The Discovery 1600's main service processor card (dubbed the dpc-283 processor) features a Zilog Z80A microprocessor with 96 KB of RAM, a DMA controller, one parallel port, and two serial ports. User processor cards came in three forms: the dpc-83U, the dpc-183, and the dpc-186. The dpc-83U runs off a Z80A and features between 64 and 96 KB (later 96 KB standard) of RAM (non-DMA) and two serial ports; each dcp-83U can only be used as a user processor. The dcp-183 and dpc-186 meanwhile may be repurposed as secondary service processor cards for multiprocessing through the use of a special secondary multiprocessing bus on their boards and through their DMA controllers. The dcp-183 runs off a Z80A processor and features 96 KB of RAM (32 KB bank-switchable) and two serial ports. The dpc-186 meanwhile incorporates an Intel 8086—with a socket for an optional Intel 8087 floating-point unit—between 128 KB and 1 MB of RAM, and two asynchronous serial ports.

The first units of the Discovery 1600 were sold to a tobacco-growing business in the Ban Phai district in Thailand. Further units were primarily sold to banks and government institutions in Thailand, with Chung using his father K. S. Chung's connections to secure these customers. By 1983, roughly 2,000 units of the Discovery 1600 had been sold. The Discovery 1600's success spurred the development of the Discovery 500, another multiuser micro released in January 1983. Like the 1600 before it, the Discovery 500 was based on an SBC-on-a-backplane; however, it reduced the number of maximum processor cards to seven, in exchange for beefier optional floppy and hard drives.

=== D/NET and dissolution (1983–1990) ===
In selling the Discovery 500, Wing Chung turned his attention to the computer market in mainland China. By 1984, ACE generated $5 million worth of revenue, or one-third of the company's global revenue, from sales to Chinese business. Sales in China were facilitated by ACE's staff of 25 salespeople and service workers in Hong Kong—half of ACE's total number of employees that year.

To keep the Discovery 1600 competitive in the market, in 1983 ACE introduced D/NET, a software and hardware system for the 1600 that facilitated a local area network comprising a star topology of Discovery 1600 computers. Up to 10 Discovery 1600s can be connected, for a total of 150 networked user terminals. The included network operating system is run on the service processor.

In the mid-1980s, Chung left ACE to found another computer startup in La Mirada, California, called Universal Digital Computer Corporation (UDC). ACE went defunct in 1990.
