= Realistic Controls =

Defunct American computer company

Realistic Controls Corporation (NCC), later Nylac Computer Corporation and Archives, Inc., was an American computer company based in Davenport, Iowa, founded in 1974.

== History ==
=== Realistic Controls Corporation (1974–1979) ===
Realistic Controls Corporation was founded in Davenport, Iowa, around 1974 by Robert Staib. In 1976 the company moved into its headquarters at 404 W. 35th Street in the city, in a building formerly occupied by a drug store. By this time Realistic Controls was involved in designing, manufacturing, and installing computerized utility meters and custom computer controls for industries. The company also had short-lived operations in Cleveland, Ohio.

RCC's client roster by 1977 included John Deere, Caterpillar Inc., a utility company in California, and the state of Iowa. Early that year, the company brought out their first computer system to the general public. Called the Z/100 family, these were microcomputers running the Intel 8080 aimed at Fortran IV programmers.

In summer 1977 the company had entered the burgeoning home computer market, devising a system projected for release by Christmas that year. Their efforts culminated in the REX, a Z80-based microcomputer with 24 KB of RAM (expandable up to 64 KB), a built-in keyboard, composite and RF video output (in color or monochrome), two built-in 5.25-inch floppy disk drives, and a 15-amp power supply. Its motherboard design was based on the S-100 bus and had five free expansion card slots. The following year RCC released a single-board computer based on the RCA 1802, the MPPS 100.

=== Nylac Computer Corporation (1979–1980) ===
In around May 1979, Realistic Controls was sold to Gary Martin and renamed the Nylac Computer Corporation. The company subsequently released another computer based on the Z80, called the Nylac.

Its motherboard had a Z80 processor running at 4 MHz, an 8257/8275 memory mapped video controller address at 0×F800, and an 8251 serial controller for input/output. There were six S-100 bus interfaces, one of which was occupied with a 5.25-inch disc controller card.

The cabinet was filled with a 13-inch CRT display, a linear power supply, two 5.25-inch floppy drives (later versions used dual headed drives). Toward the end of production, Nylacs were built with a 5-MB, 5.25-inch hard drive to replace one of the floppies. The computer ran CP/M.

=== Archives, Inc. (1980–1983) ===
In 1980, Archives, Inc., acquired Nylac and subsumed their 404 W. 35th Street headquarters. Archives, Inc., was formed in 1978 by Patricia "Tish" Hewett, wife of William Alexander Hewitt, a former chairman of John Deere. The company sold their first computer system, the Archive I (originally the Archive Business System), in April 1980. Although a general-purpose computer that could run other software such as video games, the Archive I was intended mainly as a word processor. It ran a Z80 processor and came equipped with 64 KB of RAM stock. It was followed up with the Archives II in April 1981 and the Archives III in September 1981. Although an Archive IV was planned for release by the end of 1983, the firm in March 1983 announced its closure for June that year. It had employed 40 people that year and had been achieving "satisfactory" sales in the months preceding the announcement, but lengthy production delays for the Archive IV and tight cash reserves pressured the company to shutter.
