= Visual 1050 =

8-bit desktop computer from the early 1980s

- Manufacturer: Visual Technology
- Released: 1983; 43 years ago
- Media: 2 400kb 5¼-inch floppy disks
- Operating system: CP/M Plus
- CPU: Zilog Z80 clocked at 4 MHz with a MOS Technology 6502 graphics coprocessor
- Memory: 128kB RAM, 8kb ROM
- Display: monochrome 80 chars. × 25 lines, 640 × 300 pixels
- Graphics: MOS Technology 6502
- Input: Keyboard Keytronic full stroke 93-key with numeric key pad & 17 function keys
- Dimensions: CPU - 5H × 17W × 17Din
- Weight: 15lbs

The Visual 1050 was an 8-bit desktop computer sold by Visual Technology in the early 1980s. The computer ran under the CP/M operating system and used 2 400KB, 5¼, SSDD, 96tpi floppy disk drives (TEAC FD-55E) for mass storage with an optional 10MB external Winchester hard disk drive. In addition to the Zilog Z80A processor clocked at 4 MHz, the Visual 1050 also included a MOS Technology 6502 used as a graphics coprocessor.

== Overview ==
The Visual 1050 featured a dual-processor architecture; Z80A processor as the main CPU and a 6502 to drive the display.

In addition to the Z80 and 6502 chips, the system also included a Intel 8255A PIO, a Intel 8251A USART, a Intel 8214 Programmable Interrupt Controller, a Motorola 6845 CRT controller, a Western Digital 1793 floppy disk controller, and a OKI MSM5832 real time clock.

160K of RAM was included with the system, with 128K of this programmable and 32K reserved for use by the display processor.

The display was bit-mapped at a resolution of 640 × 300 pixels with 80 × 25 characters (at 8 × 12 pixel each) on a green monochrome CRT. The display offered programmable features which could be invoked from the main processing unit via a character-stream interface built in between the Z80 CPU and 6502 coprocessor.

Two communication ports were available: an RS-232C serial port and a Centronics parallel port.

The machine had a Keytronic full stroke 93-key keyboard with numeric keypad and 17 function keys.

A standard Visual 1050 shipped with CP/M Plus operating system, a CP/M source disk, a copy of WordStar word processor with MailMerge software, Microsoft Multiplan spreadsheet, Digital Research DR Graph charting software, Digital Research CBASIC computer language, and an RS-232C communications program. Optionally there was support for a 10MB Winchester hard-drive via a Xebec S1410 Disk Controller.

== See also ==
- Visual 50 - a video display terminal produced by Visual Technology
