= Intertec Superbrain =

Early Z80-based microcomputer

Intertec SuperBrain
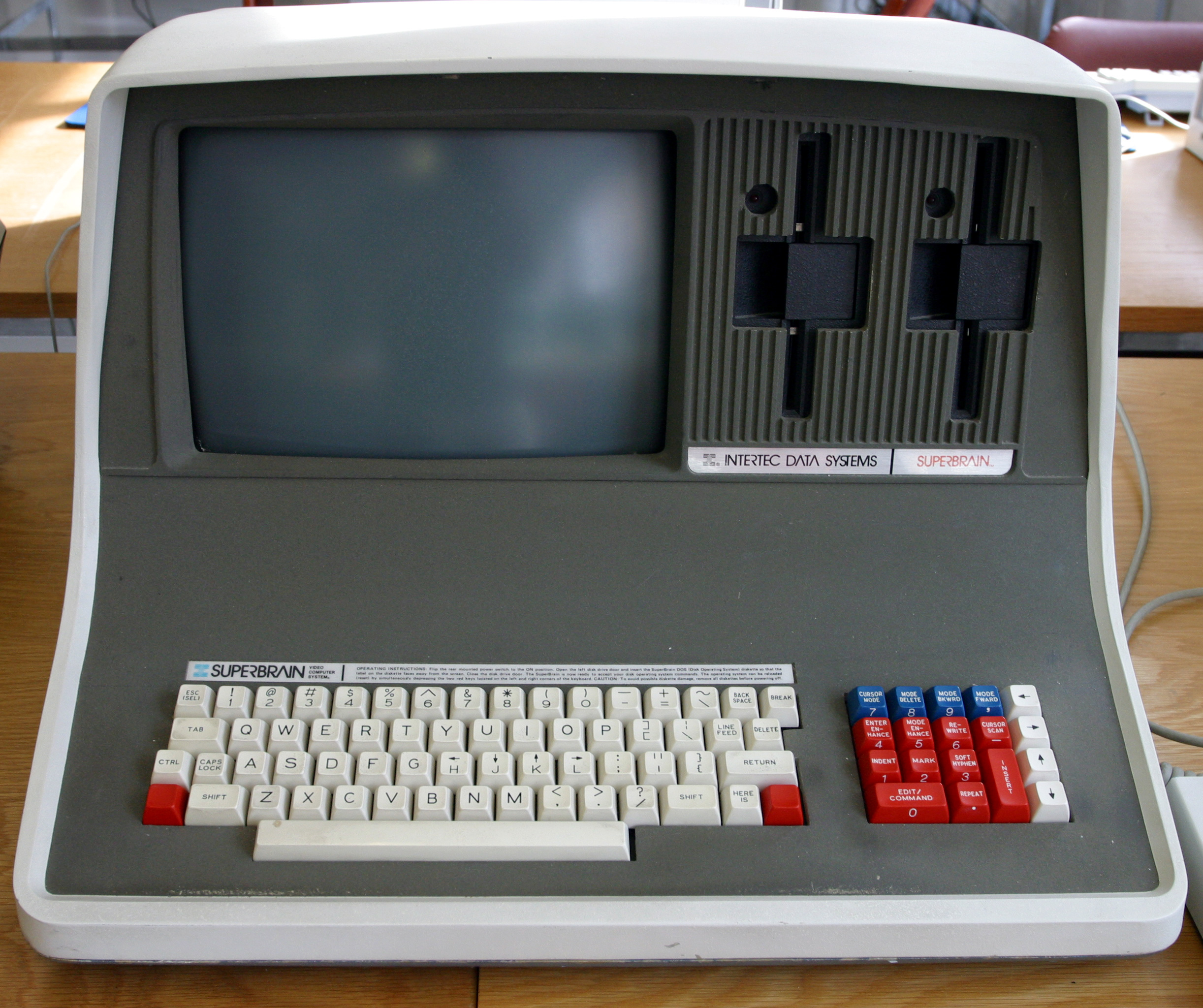
- The twin-Z80 Intertec SuperBrain
- Manufacturer: Intertec Data Systems
- Type: microcomputer
- Released: 1979; 47 years ago
- Operating system: CP/M
- CPU: (2x) Z80 @ 4 MHz
- Memory: 64 KB RAM; 2 KB ROM
- Display: 80 × 25 character text; 12-inch monochrome CRT
- Connectivity: Two RS-232 serial ports
- Dimensions: H: 14-5/8-inch W: 21-3/8-inch D: 23-1/8-inch
- Weight: 45 lb (20 kg)

The Intertec SuperBrain was an all-in-one commercial microcomputer that was first sold by Intertec Data Systems Corporation of Columbia, South Carolina, USA in 1979. The machine ran the operating system CP/M and was somewhat unusual in that it used dual Z80 CPUs, the second being used as a disk controller. In 1981, it sold with 64K of RAM for $2649 ($9368 in 2025 USD) and the QD model was $3195 (approximately $11,300 in 2025 USD). In 1983, the basic machine sold for about US$2,000 (equivalent to $6,470 in 2025).

There were several variants, including the SuperBrain II (released in 1982), SuperBrain II Jr., "QD" (quad-density disk drives) and "SD" (super density) models.

Intertec also released a similar looking dumb terminal, the Intertube, and smart terminal, the Emulator.

The SuperBrain is notable for being at the user end of the first Kermit connection in 1981.

The machine was practical and useful in the office environment, but somewhat limited until the arrival of the first 5 MB hard drive in one of the floppy drive bays. This was soon replaced by the 10 MB hard drive.

Up to 255 CompuStar workstations could be daisy-chained together via DC-37 "Chaining Adaptor" parallel ports to share the "central disk system" (one of the three hard drive peripheral options below). Each computer, or VPU (Video Processing Unit), was assigned a unique number from 1 to 255 by setting an eight-position DIP switch.

The Brazilian company Prológica introduced the Sistema 700 in 1981, based on the SuperBrain and with similar characteristics.

== Specifications ==
Model Number	Processor	Disk Drives	Clock Speed	RAM
CompuStar 10	Z80	No drives (network device)	4 MHz	64 KB
Jr / CompuStar 20	Z80	170 KB	4 MHz	64 KB
QD (Quad Density) / CompuStar 30	Z80	340 KB	4 MHz	64 KB
SD (Super Density) / CompuStar 40	Z80	780 KB	4 MHz	64 KB

== Peripherals ==
- CompuStar DSS-10 10 MB Hard Drive (CompuStar Disk Storage System)
- CDC 96 MB Hard Drive (80 MB fixed disk with 16 MB removable platter)
- Priam 14-inch 144 MB Hard Drive

== Applications ==
- Microsoft BASIC
- 8080 assembler
- Microsoft COBOL 74
- APL

== In pop culture ==
The Superbrain can be seen in two episodes of Knight Rider: one in Season 1, Episode 10, "The Final Verdict" (1982), and the second in Season 1, Episode 18, "White Bird" (1983).

In John Carpenter’s The Thing, Dr. Blair uses a Superbrain to analyse samples from The Thing from which he estimates that it will take over the world in about three years.

The BBC Open University series "Computers and Computing" mentioned the Superbrain in the episode "Mainframes and Micros Unite" (1983), where it was shown performing financial modelling.
