= Triumph-Adler =

German office equipment manufacturer

TA Triumph-Adler GmbH
- Company type: GmbH
- Industry: Technology
- Founded: 1896; 130 years ago in Nuremberg
- Headquarters: Nuremberg, Germany
- Products: Document management systems; Office equipment
- Parent: Kyocera (since 2010)

TA Triumph-Adler GmbH (formerly TA Triumph-Adler AG) is a German office equipment manufacturer based in Nuremberg and founded in 1896. The company currently manufactures computer printers and other document management systems. The company is now part of the Japanese conglomerate Kyocera.

== History ==
Triumph-Adler was founded in 1896 by Siegfried Bettmann as Deutsche Triumph Fahrradwerke Aktiengesellschaft (AG) in Nuremberg as a subsidiary of the Triumph Cycle Co. Ltd. of Coventry.

Until 1909, Deutsche Triumph Fahrradwerke AG only produced bicycles. Briefly, they also manufactured motorcycles. In 1909, Triumph entered the office equipment business after purchasing the equipment of a bankrupt typewriter company whose assets were being auctioned off to the public.

In 1911, the company changed its name to Triumph Werke Nürnberg AG, and two years later it was split off from Triumph Engineering. During World War I and World War II, Triumph mainly manufactured typewriters, bicycles, motorcycles and even automobiles. On the side, it also produced wheelbarrows and handcarts.

In 1957, Grundig under control of its founder Max Grundig purchased a majority stake in Triumph Werke Nürnberg as well as in Adlerwerke. In 1958, Grundig merged both companies as well as the dictation machine division of its Grundig tape recorder factories (Grundig Stenorette) to form Triumph-Adler-Büromaschinen-Vertriebs-GmbH. From then on, the company only produced and sold office machines.

In 1968, Triumph-Adler was ranked the sixth-largest office machine manufacturer in the world. In 1968, Grundig sold Triumph-Adler to the Litton Industries of the United States. This had come after Grundig had been looking to streamline the company, after it began focusing most of its efforts around producing consumer electronics and especially color television sets—a booming market for Grundig in the late 1960s. In 1979, Triumph-Adler returned to Germany after Volkswagen AG acquired a majority stake in 1979, followed by the remaining stakes in 1980. Volkswagen had previously failed to enter the office machines industry in 1978 after a bid to gain a majority stake in Nixdorf Computer fell through. In 1980, Triumph-Adler acquired a majority stake in Pertec Computer Corporation. Pertec themselves had acquired Micro Instrumentation and Telemetry Systems (MITS), designers of the famous Altair 8800 microcomputer, in 1977. Triumph-Adler further expanded its strategic position with the Alphatronic brand of computer systems in the increasingly competitive computer business. In 1981, they acquired Omnidata of Westlake Village, California, to expand their presence in the turnkey word processor computer systems segment.

In 1985, the name was changed again to TA Triumph-Adler AG. In 1986, Olivetti S.p.A., a competitor to TA based in Italy, purchased the majority of TA's holdings from Volkswagen. With this acquisition, Olivetti grabbed 50% of the European typewriter market. After the acquisition, domestic production and development of TA products in German largely halted, and several German manufacturing facilities, including the traditional Frankfurter Adlerwerke in 1993, were shuttered and sold off. Sales were outsourced to a separate company. In 1994, a consortium of shareholders acquired the Triumph-Adler subsidiary from Olivetti and converted it into a medium-sized holding company that now included office, games and leisure, construction technology and healthcare divisions.

In 2003, Kyocera Mita Corporation (now Kyocera Document Solutions), a Japanese manufacturer of copy, print and fax systems, acquired a 25% stake in TA in exchange for rebranding Kyocera's hardware under the TA name. In early 2009, Kyocera Document Solutions took over the majority of Triumph-Adler; and in October 2010, they purchased the remaining shares.
