= D8000 =

Personal computer manufactured in Brazil in 1980

D-8000
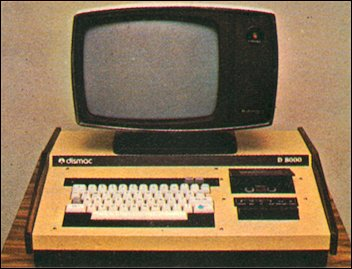
- Manufacturer: Dismac
- Released: 1980; 46 years ago
- Media: Cassette
- Operating system: Basic Level II
- CPU: Zilog Z80A @ 2 MHz
- Memory: 16 KB
- Removable storage: Cassette Drive
- Display: 12" green monochrome CRT or TV RF out; 64x16 characters, 32x16 characters, 128x48 semigraphics
- Backward compatibility: TRS-80 Model I

Released in 1980, the Dismac D-8000 was the first personal computer manufactured in Brazil. It was also the first Brazilian TRS-80 Model I clone.

It used a 2 MHz Zilog Z80A microprocessor, with 16 KB of RAM and 16 KB of ROM (containing Level II BASIC).

It was sold with a 12" green monochrome CRT screen, displaying 64 × 16 or 32 × 16 characters text mode or 128 × 48 semigraphics. Video output was also possible through a PAL-M television. The keyboard contained 51 keys and was part of the case, like the cassette recorder and the main processor unit.

The D-8000 is considered rare, even in the Brazilian vintage computer market.

An updated D-8000 version was introduced in 1982, featuring a separate cassette recorder, along with two new versions, the D-8001 and D-8002. The D-8001 included a printer and a support table, while the D-8002 added 32 KB of RAM and a floppy disc drive.
