= LNW-80 =

1982 home computer by LNW Research

- Manufacturer: LNW Research
- Released: 1982; 44 years ago
- Discontinued: 1984; 42 years ago
- Operating system: TRSDOS, CP/M
- CPU: Z-80A @ 1.77 or 4 MHz
- Memory: 48 KB
- Display: 64×16, 80×24 characters; 128×48 semigraphics, 8 colors; 480×192 monochrome; 384×192 pixels, 2 colors for each 3x4 pixel
- Sound: Built-in speaker, tone generator
- Backward compatibility: Tandy TRS-80 Model 1

The LNW-80, released in 1982, is the first computer built by LNW Research Corporation (later known as LNW Computers). The computer is 100% compatible with the Tandy TRS-80 Model 1, but has some hardware enhancements. Most notable are the high-resolution color graphics, which could also be used for an 80×24 screen, with a special software driver (TRS-80 is 64×16, while 80×24 is the screen size most CP/M software needed). Other enhancements were high processor speed (Z-80A at 4 MHz), color support, and optionally, CP/M support. The LNW-80 was also sold as a kit.

The LNW supported four screen modes:

- Mode 0 is the default TRS-80 screen with 64×16 characters, and 128×48 semigraphics.
- Mode 1 is 480×192 monochrome.
- Mode 2 uses high-resolution graphics memory to colorize the mode 0 graphics. This results in 128×48 dots with 8 colors per dot. This mode could be used to 'colorize' the standard TRS-80 games when loaded with special software.
- Mode 3 uses low-res character memory to colorize the high-res pixels. This results in 384×192 pixels on 128×48 color fields. Per color field, a foreground and background color is selected from the basic eight colors. The colors are white, green, yellow, red, magenta, blue, blue-green and black.

== LNW Research ==
LNW Research started by making third party extensions for the Tandy TRS-80 Model I market. They started in 1979 with the LNW System Expansion, a D.I.Y. kit that competed with the TRS-80 Expansion Interface. The LNW-80 appeared at the end of 1980. Later, in 1981, came the LNDoubler, an adapter enbabling the use of double-density disks. 1983 saw the LNW-80 Model 2, an upgraded model of the LNW-80 which was natively capable of running (and shipped with) CP/M. Finally, in 1984, the company introduced the LNW Team, which provided a slot for an optional Intel 8088 board for MS-DOS compatibility. The company folded due to bankruptcy later in 1984.

== Reactions and Reviews ==
In response to a letter to the editor complaining about freezes on the TRS-80 Model I, Creative Computing's Editorial Director said: "This is a continuing problem, which we have not solved. In fact, it is the main reason that we have been converting to the LNW-80 computer for some of our in-house computing. It has yet to show the problem, while our Model I's and Model III's do lock up."

80 Microcomputing's review of the LNW-80 kit warned, "[b[uilding an LNW-80 is not a project for a beginner". It praised the circuitry ("[m]ost of the circuit design is a leap ahead of the TRS-80"), but criticized the keyboard ("the designers were out to lunch"), the "overpriced" cost of the "attractive" case, and the fact that 80x24 text was in graphics mode rather than true text. The overall conclusion: "[t]he LNW-80 is, for the most part, a well designed, fast, effective computer."

Kilobaud Microcomputing said that it "performs superbly" and that its "price and performance make it an excellent bargain."

BYTE ran a review criticizing the LNW-80 Model 2's documentation and 80x24 video driver, but praising it overall, concluding: "[t]he LNW’s price is comparable to or better than its competition's, and its quality of construction is outstanding. Then too, it comes with as much or more software than any other 8-bit computer I know of.... It's hard to choose which one of the LNW's advantages is most important."
