= Max-80 =

- Manufacturer: Lobo Systems
- Type: Personal computer
- Released: 1982; 44 years ago
- Media: External disk drive
- Operating system: LDOS and CP/M
- CPU: Zilog Z80-B @ 5.07MHz
- Memory: 64K, 128K max
- Removable storage: Floppy Disks
- Display: Composite video out; 64x16 or 80x24 characters

The MAX-80 is a personal computer released in 1982 by Lobo Systems (formerly Lobo Drives International, a company from California). It differed from other TRS-80 compatible computers in that it was not hardware compatible with the TRS-80.

== Hardware ==
The MAX-80 featured a Zilog Z80-B CPU which ran at 5.07 MHz, a very fast speed for its time. It came standard with 64KB of RAM, and was expandable via sockets for a further 64KB.

The standard configuration originally consisted of a 64KB unit (later 128KB) and CP/M. The user could buy a complete system, or provide their own monitor and disk drives.

The floppy disk controller could handle 8-inch drives using the standard IBM 3740 format in single-sided or double-sided modes, as well as 5.25-inch floppy drives with up to 80 cylinders. The Max-80 included a hard disk interface and two RS-232 serial ports. The MAX-80's character generator was user programmable.

== Software ==
Up to 95% of TRS-80 Model III software would function without modification on the MAX-80. This did not include games. The MAX-80's special version of LDOS was able to run most Model III programs directly; for other programs, such as VisiCalc, a patch disk was available. The CP/M operating system was offered as well.

A patched version of the TRS-80 Model 4's LS-DOS 6.x operating system was later made available for the MAX-80. This was called MAXDOS.

== Community ==
A users' group called MAXIMUL published a MAX-80 newsletter. MAXIMUL actually outlived Lobo Systems, lasting until 1989.

== Reception ==
Jerry Pournelle wrote in September 1983 that if the Max-80 came with more bundled software "it would be a strong contender for the best deal in microcomputerland. As it is, it's a lot of machine for the money". He recommended that customers join Maximul.
