= Compaq LTE (1st generation) =

Series of laptops by Compaq

LTE

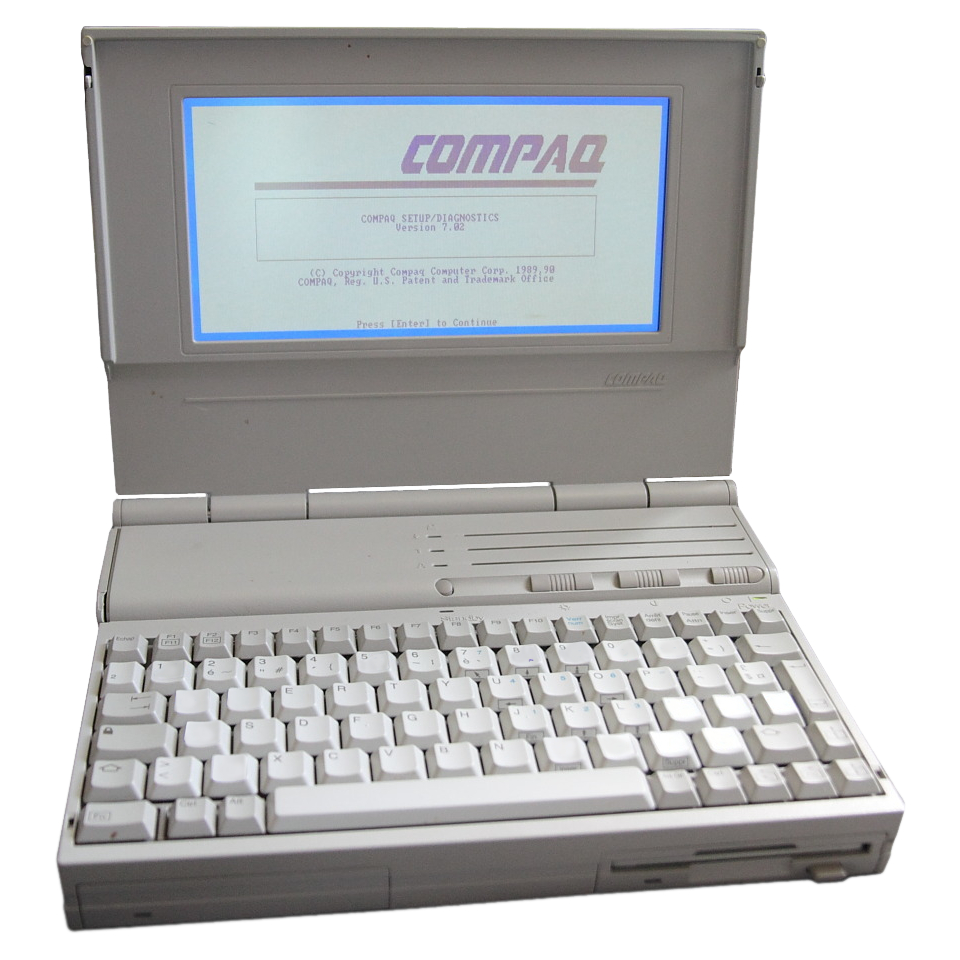
- LTE/286
- Developer: Compaq
- Manufacturer: Compaq; Citizen Watch
- Product family: LTE
- Type: Laptop (notebook)
- Generation: First
- Released: October 16, 1989; 37 years ago
- Lifespan: 1989–1993
- Units sold: Over 100,000 (LTE and LTE/286); At least 69,200 (LTE 386s/20)
- Operating system: MS-DOS; Microsoft Windows
- CPU: Intel 80C86 (LTE); Intel 80C286 (LTE/286); Intel 386SX (LTE 386s/20)
- Predecessor: SLT
- Successor: LTE Lite

The LTE, LTE/286, and LTE 386s/20 were a series of notebook-sized laptops manufactured by Compaq from 1989 to 1992. The three laptops comprise the first generation of the LTE line, which was Compaq's second attempt at a laptop following the SLT in 1988 and their first attempt at a truly lightweight portable computer. The LTE line proved highly popular—Compaq selling hundreds of thousands of units between the three—and gave way to successive generations of the line, including the LTE Lite, the LTE Elite, and the LTE 5000 series. With its use of industry-standard floppy and hard drive technologies, the LTE was the first commercially successful IBM PC–compatible notebook and helped launch the fledgling PC notebook industry, which had seen earlier attempts fail due to the use of novel but nonstandard data storage.

== Development and specifications ==
=== LTE and LTE/286 ===
The concept for the LTE line was originally drafted for Compaq in 1986 by Christopher J. Gintz, who was director of technical and planning development for the company at the time. Between this time and the unveiling of the LTE on October 16, 1989, Compaq released the Portable 386 in 1987, another entry in Compaq's long line of portable computers that were compatible with IBM's Personal Computer platform. In 1988, they released the SLT/286, Compaq's first ever laptop.

The notebook computer emerged as a size category of portable computer starting with Epson's HX-20 in 1982. It was further popularized by Radio Shack's TRS-80 Model 100 in 1983. In terms of footprint, these notebooks measured roughly the size of a sheet of ANSI Letter paper—8.5 by 11 inches (215.9 by 279.4 mm)—making them easy to slip into an average-sized briefcase, and were relatively lightweight, making them easy to lift with one hand. The first notebook on the market compatible with the IBM PC was NEC's UltraLite in 1988. Weighing in at 4.4 pounds (2.0 kg), the UltraLite eschewed from conventional floppy and hard disk drives for software and data storage, in favor of proprietary ROM and RAM cards. This approach was technically impressive but led to slow adoption rates by consumers due to the difficulty of transferring data to and from IBM PCs and compatibles because of the lack of an internal floppy drive. Zenith Data Systems' notebook-sized MinisPort, released slightly after the UltraLite in 1989, did little to ameliorate this issue despite offering an internal floppy drive due to its non-standard, 2-inch format. In July 1989, Toshiba released the "book-sized" DynaBook J-3100 in July 1989, which was a smash hit in Japan and similarly featured a 3.5-inch floppy drive. However, its footprint was larger than letter paper by over an inch in both dimensions, hampering its carriability; it also lacked the option for a hard drive.

The LTE and LTE/286 were true notebooks, each occupying exactly the footprint of ANSI Letter paper while measuring 1.9 inches (48 mm) thick. Avoiding the high adoption curve of NEC and Zenith's notebooks, Compaq's LTE was the first true notebook on the market with conventional 3.5-inch floppy disk drives (manufactured by Citizen Watch), as well as the first with optional hard disk drives. Compaq sourced the latter from Conner Peripherals. Despite the drive's platters measuring 3.5 inches in diameter, as had been typical of desktops since the late 1980s, the drive's casing measured 0.75 inches (19 mm) thick—much thinner than the desktop drives of its day. This allowed Compaq to fit a spinning hard drive within the confines of the notebook-sized computer. Compaq offered the baseline, 8086-equipped LTE with either an internal 20-MB Conner hard drive or no hard drive at all (while still possessing a floppy drive). On the other hand, Compaq offered users the option to buy the 286-based LTE/286 with a 40-MB hard drive, a 20-MB hard drive, or no hard drive. Compaq also sold external 360-KB and 1.2-MB 5.25-inch floppy drives compatible with the LTE as means of removable storage.

The LTE and LTE/286 feature monochrome LCD screens co-designed by Compaq with Citizen Watch and manufactured by the latter. The LCD measures 7.7 inches wide by 3.7 inches tall, for an aspect ratio of roughly 2.1:1 (making graphical elements on the screen, such as perfectly circular pie charts, appear stretched), and is capable of displaying CGA graphics in four shades of gray. The screens contain a blue electroluminescent backlight, allowing users to read off the laptops in low-light conditions.

For processors, the LTE sports an 80C86 clocked at 9.54 MHz, while the LTE/286 is based on the 80C286 clocked at 12 MHz. Both are respectively CMOS versions of Intel's 8086 and 80286 processors, intended for low-power applications such as battery-powered portable computers. For the LTE/286 only, the laptop supports an optional math co-processor, the 80C287. Users had to partially disassemble the machine to install the processor, which fits into a socket on the motherboard. For memory, both the LTE and LTE/286 are equipped with 640 KB of internal RAM, expandable to 1.6 MB (for the LTE) or 2.6 MB (for the LTE/286) of RAM with the use of the use of 1- and 2-MB proprietary RAM cards that were sold by Compaq. A third-party manufacturer, AMKLY Systems Inc. of Irvine, California (founded by Albert C. Wong of AST Research), offered a 4 MB RAM card for the LTE/286 in late 1990, allowing the computer to be expanded to 4.6 MB.

The back of both LTEs feature ports for parallel communications, serial devices (RS-232, 9-pin), an external RGBI monitor, the optional external 5.25-inch floppy drive, and an optional external numeric keypad sold by Compaq. Yet another option was a 2,400 bit/s internal modem or a second serial port; both slot into the same option connector on the right side of the machine.

The Compaq LTE and LTE/286 were primarily manufactured by Compaq at their Houston campus. A few weeks after their announcement, Compaq signed a contract with Citizen to allow the latter to manufacture models of the LTE and LTE/286 for distribution in Europe, Asia, and the Middle East; while Houston would cover the United States, Canada, and Australia. This was the first time that Citizen, primarily a manufacture of timepieces and precision electronics, had manufactured an entire computer system.

=== LTE 386s/20 ===
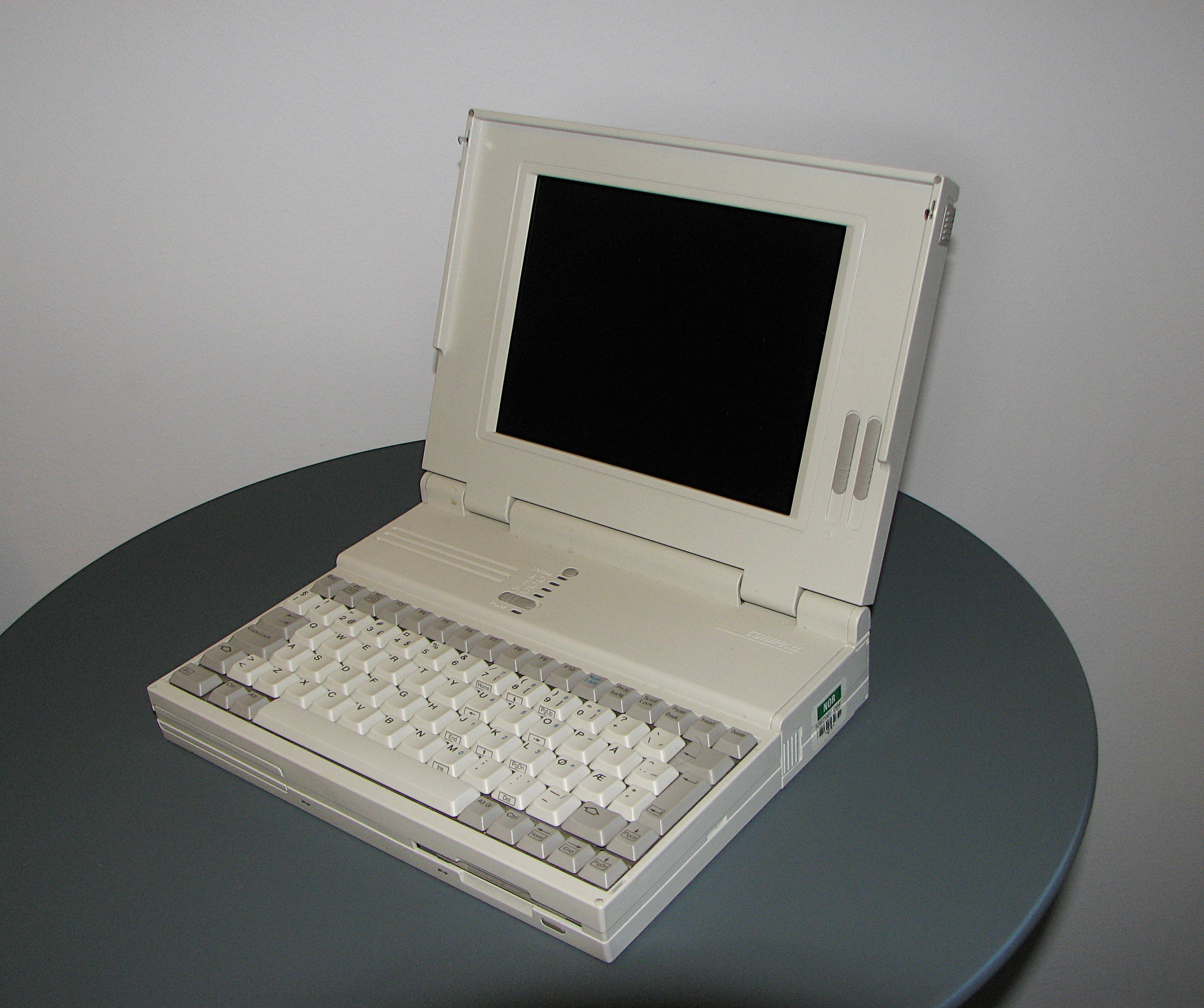
LTE 386s/20, from 1990

Almost exactly a year after Compaq announced the LTE and LTE/286, on October 15, 1990, the company unveiled a new model in the line, the LTE 386s/20, featuring the Intel 386SX processor clocked at 20 MHz. The stock memory was bumped up to 2 MB, expandable to 10 MB, with the same proprietary RAM cards as its predecessor; the number of card slots was increased to two for the LTE 386s/20. The LTE 386s/20 also replaced the stubbly display panel of the older models with a full-sized, 9-inch-diagonal LCD capable of displaying VGA graphics in sixteen shades of gray. It marked the first time since their SLT in 1988 that Compaq supported VGA in a portable of theirs.

The designers behind the LTE 386s/20 made heavy use of rigid-flex interconnects between the different printed circuit boards in order to save weight and reduce the amount of fragile wires and cables needed to communicate between different components and boards. In a further bid for miniaturization, Compaq populated the LTE 386s/20's motherboard with ten ASICs of their own design. Furthermore, the LTE 386s/20 was the first of Compaq's laptops to use Conner's portable-oriented hard drives, whose platter diameters measured 2.5 inches across as opposed to 3.5 inches across. On launch, the LTE 386s/20 was available with either 30-MB or 60-MB hard drives; in November 1991, Compaq added a 84-MB-drive model. Despite the optimizations in manufacturing, the LTE 386s/20's weight and thickness was increased slightly compared to its predecessors, from 6.7 pounds (3.0 kg) to 7.5 pounds (3.4 kg) and from 1.6 inches (41 mm) thick to 2.2 inches (56 mm).

The LTE 386s/20 was the first LTE offered with an optional docking station. Called the Desktop Expansion Base, it allows the computer to be used more or less like a desktop computer. The docking station added a pair of full-length, 16-bit ISA slots to the machine and two 5.25-inch drive bays. Compaq shipped the Desktop Expansion Base with a VGA monitor and a standard desktop keyboard. The docking station connected to the back of the LTE 386s/20 via a new specialized connector on the rear of the laptop; a new sliding port door was added to protect these connectors from dust intrusion. Compaq also sold an internal CD-ROM adapter for the LTE 386s/20 that fits into its modem expansion slot, allowing the computer to be used with an optional external CD-ROM drive, making it one of the first laptops to natively support CD-ROM.

== Defects ==
For the manufacturing of the baseline LTE and LTE/286, Compaq used a formulation of ABS plastic different than the ones used on their earlier portable machines. While Compaq believed the new formulation to have been better for strength characteristics, a significant number of units began developing hairline cracks on the sides of the case over a year after their market introduction. It was the first time in Compaq's history that any of the company's products suffered a widespread defect. Following the incident, in October 1990 Compaq returned to their original ABS resin and issued newly manufactured cases to dealers for customers requesting repairs to their defective units. For the LTE 386s/20, Compaq sourced a more durable ABS plastic than either of the two previous resins.

== Sales and reception ==
The LTE was an immediate hot-seller for Compaq. Between October 1989 and July 1990, Compaq sold a combined 84,777 units between the LTE and LTE/286. Between July and August 1990 alone, Compaq sold an additional 10,011 units between the two models. By December of that year, Compaq passed the 100,000 unit mark.

Every new laptop computer released is touted as the breakthrough in portable computer technology. The Compaq LTE/286 is not excepted from that familiar marketing teaser, but it really does represent a breakthrough. It's perhaps the most significant development in portable computing since the Model 100. We have seen no other machine that comes close to combining the power and battery life of the LTE/286 in so small and light a package.

— Sherwin Levinson, in InfoWorld

The LTE and LTE/286 received glowing praise in the computing press, with InfoWorld's Sherwin Levinson calling the LTE/286 in particular a "breakthrough for portable computing" that "combines power and battery life unlike any we've seen in so small and light a package". Levinson rated the LTE/286's processor nearly twice as fast as the NEC V20 used in the UltraLite while almost nearing the performance seen in Zenith Data Systems' much-larger SupersPort 286. He further wrote that the magazine's review board found that "[in] testing the LTE/286 we found the size, weight, and battery life an unmitigated joy", while holding reservations about the passive-matrix display, which was susceptible to interference patterns caused by crosstalk. PC World featured the LTE on the front cover of their December 1989 issue; in it, reviewer Eric Knorr wrote: "Compatible, capacious mass storage makes the LTE series a genuine breakthrough. Forget about the UltraLite's credit-card-ROM applications and the MinisPort's 2-inch floppy drive." While finding the LTE's keyboard layout and keyfeel inferior to that of the MinisPort and decrying the lack of a docking station option on the initial LTE models as "effectively rul[ing] out the systems as primary machines", Knorr wrote that, "Quibbles like these aside, the LTEs seem certain to sell like snow chains in ski season".

Mitt Jones of PC Magazine called the LTE and LTE/286, "without reservation, the most exciting and usable laptops on the market", albeit very expensive at over US$3,500 and $5,000 at launch, respectively. Of the 80C86-based LTE, Jones wrote called the machine "somewhat miraculous ... In the same way the UltraLite seemed impossible for its size [in 1988], the LTE seems impossible now". He opined that the power-efficient nature of the 80C86 did not warrant the same heavy battery as that of the LTE/286 but found, as a consequence, the laptop lasted over five hours on a single charge, without any power-conservation features enabled. Fredric Burke of the same publication, reviewing the LTE/286 a year after its release, called it "the class act in its field", praising its expandability, the legibility of the LCD, and the performance of the battery.

Sales of the LTE 386s/20 were initially marred by production setbacks and parts shortages, compounded with high demand, threatening Compaq's lead in the notebook market. Only roughly 2,700 units of the LTE 386s/20 were purchased between November 1990 and the end of February 1991. Sales of the LTE 386s/20 quadrupled in early 1991, by which point Computerworld noted that the laptop had garnered a loyal user base. Compaq sold 35,231 units of the LTE 386s/20 between March and June 1991 and 31,356 units between June and September 1991. By the end of 1991, Compaq's primacy in the market had faltered as competitors such as AST Research and Dell had entered the market with PC-compatible notebook computers with equivalent features to the LTE while costing less. According to Bloomberg Businessweek, the various production snafus were a decisive factor in the departure of Michael S. Swavely, president of Compaq's North American division since 1989, and the entrance of Eckhard Pfeiffer as Compaq's chief operating officer, in January 1991.

Despite these setbacks, the LTE 386s/20 was met with even more praise in the technology press. Patrick Lyons, reviewing the LTE 386s/20 in InfoWorld, called it "well designed and powerful", as well as the fastest notebook computer the magazine had reviewed up to that point in early 1991. In PC Magazine, the LTE 386s/20 was featured on the front page of their March 12, 1991, issue, where the review board evaluated it as the fastest-performing 386-class notebook in terms of conventional memory writes, file access in MS-DOS, and DOS API–initiated disk seeks; it also scored high marks in number-crunching power and graphical performance. Reviewer Greg Pastrick wrote that "Price considerations are always important, but the LTE 386s/20's functionality, performance, and expansion possibilities justify its place in business and industry". Joseph Desposito of the same publication was less impressed with the laptop a little less than a year after its introduction, writing: "Unless you need the Compaq name on your notebook, you'll find more elsewhere, and for less". Sesposito found reservation with the reverse-L-shaped arrow keys of the keyboard, which he deemed annoying to use.

== Legacy ==
The LTE was the first commercially successful IBM PC–compatible notebook computer and helped energize the market for PC-based notebooks. Compaq's decision to include a 3.5-inch floppy disk drive and a conventional spinning hard disk drives on higher-end models—the former allowing for effortless data exchange with desktop computers and the latter allowing for much larger storage capacities than contemporary solid-state media—was instrumental in its commercial success. Compaq shipped the remaining units of the first generation of LTEs in 1993 after having launched the next generation in the line, the LTE Lite, in 1992.

The unexpected success of the LTE line was a major factor in the development of notebook computers at both Apple and IBM. Apple released their first laptop, the Macintosh Portable, in September 1989—a little over a month before the LTE debuted. While in development longer than the LTE and with a far larger sales backlog, the LTE outperformed the Macintosh Portable in the marketplace by an order of magnitude due to its smaller footprint and lower weight. Randy Battat, VP of worldwide product marketing at Apple, reflected: "We didn't recognize how fast the market was moving", while another Apple manager retrospected: "When you put a Portable next to an LTE, you have to say, 'Where are we?'" In response, Apple developed what would become the PowerBook in 1990, starting with the PowerBook 100. According to Deborah A. Dell, a founding member of the team responsible for the ThinkPad at IBM, the LTE spurred IBM to rush the development of a smaller laptop to compete with Compaq. This initiative eventually bore the PS/2 Model L40 SX, a predecessor to the ThinkPad, in 1991.

== Models ==
Compaq LTE (1st generation) series lineup
Model	Release date	Processor	Clock speed (MHz)	LCD technology	LCD size (in.)	LCD resolution	Stock memory (max.)	External cache (KB)	HDD (MB)
LTE Model 1	October 1989	Intel 8086	9.54	Passive-matrix monochrome	8.8	640×200	640 KB (1.6 MB)		None
LTE Model 20	October 1989	Intel 8086	9.54	Passive-matrix monochrome	8.8	640×200	640 KB (1.6 MB)		20 MB
LTE/286 Model 1	October 1989	Intel 80286	12	Passive-matrix monochrome	8.8	640×200	640 KB (2.6 MB)		None
LTE/286 Model 20	October 1989	Intel 80286	12	Passive-matrix monochrome	8.8	640×200	640 KB (2.6 MB)		20 MB
LTE/286 Model 40	October 1989	Intel 80286	12	Passive-matrix monochrome	8.8	640×200	640 KB (2.6 MB)		40 MB
LTE 386s/20 Model 30	October 1990	Intel i386SX	20	Passive-matrix monochrome	9	640×480	2 MB (10 MB)	64	30 MB
LTE 386s/20 Model 60	October 1990	Intel i386SX	20	Passive-matrix monochrome	9	640×480	2 MB (10 MB)	64	30 MB
LTE 386s/20 Model 84	November 1991	Intel i386SX	20	Passive-matrix monochrome	9	640×480	2 MB (10 MB)	64	30 MB
