= Compaq LTE Lite =

1990s series of notebook-sized laptops

LTE Lite

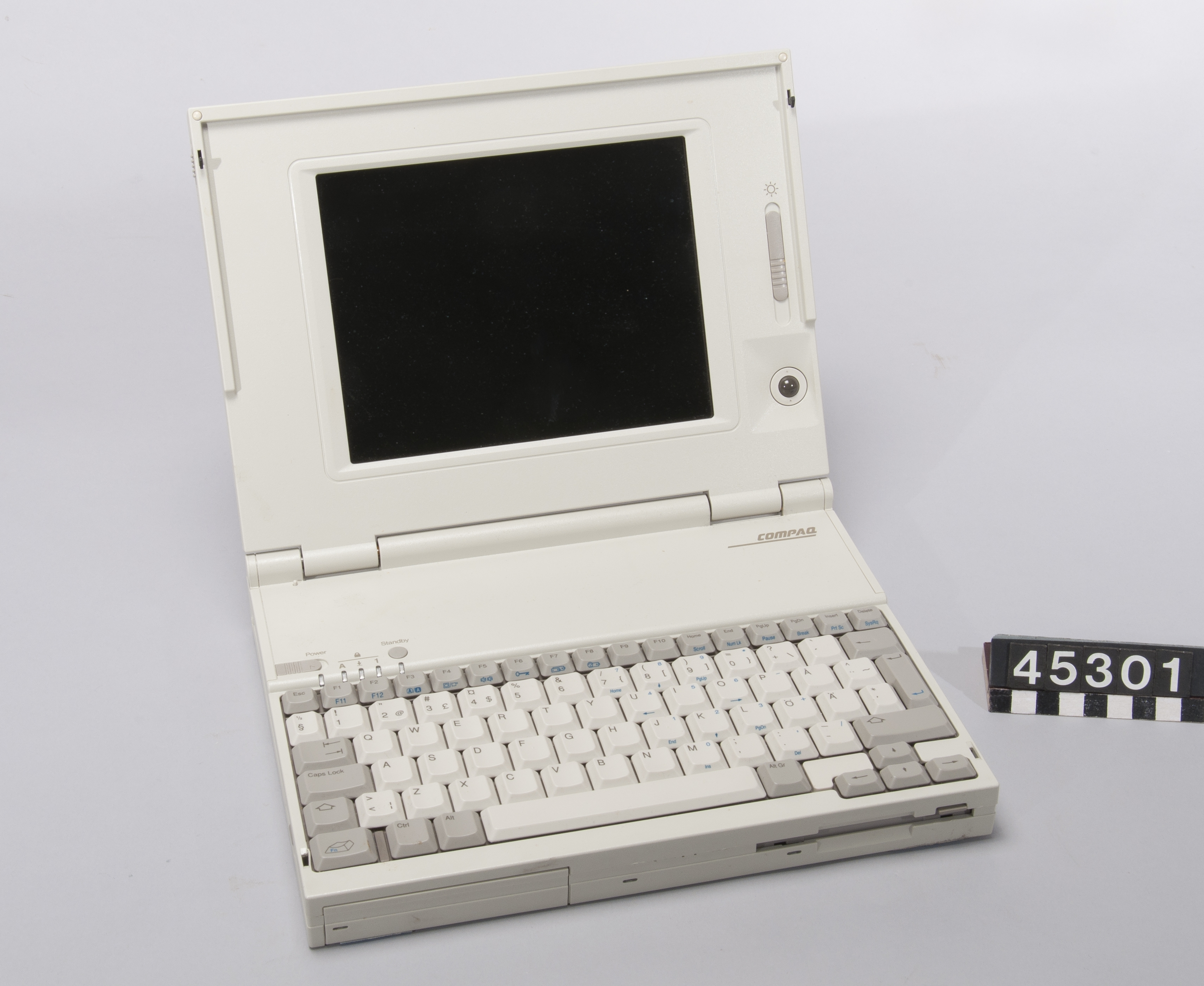
- LTE Lite 4/33C
- Developer: Compaq
- Manufacturer: Compaq; Citizen Watch
- Product family: LTE
- Type: Laptop (notebook)
- Generation: Second
- Released: January 27, 1992; 34 years ago
- Lifespan: 1992–1994
- Operating system: MS-DOS; Microsoft Windows
- CPU: Intel 80386SL; Intel 80486SL
- Predecessor: LTE; LTE/286; LTE 386s/20
- Successor: LTE Elite

The LTE Lite was a series of notebook-sized laptops under the LTE line manufactured by Compaq from 1992 to 1994. The first entries in the series were Compaq's first computers after co-founder Rod Canion's ousting and Eckhard Pfeiffer's tenure as the new CEO. The notebooks were co-developed and manufactured by Compaq and Citizen Watch of Japan. They were a hot-seller for Compaq and spanned multiple models, with various processors and liquid-crystal display technologies.

== Development and specifications ==
The LTE Lite series was the second generation of LTE, a notebook family introduced three years earlier in 1989. The first two entries in the LTE Lite series, the LTE Lite/20 and the LTE Lite/25, were the first computers released under Eckhard Pfeiffer's tenure as CEO. Pfeiffer assumed the position on October 24, 1991; he replaced Compaq co-founder Rod Canion, who was ousted from the company a day after the company posted its first quarterly loss—$70.3 million—leading to Compaq's first ever round of layoffs.

The LTE Lites improved the battery life and quality of its liquid-crystal display panels while reducing weight. The LTE Lite/20 and LTE Lite/25 introduced suspend and hibernation modes, as well as a BIOS password and a Kensington slot for added security. Starting with the LTE Lite/25C and LTE Lite/25E, a trackball was built into the display housing on the right side, with the left- and right-click buttons on the reverse side of the housing. An internal modem, 9600-baud, was optional.

Manufacturing of the LTE Lites was initially performed at Compaq's plant in Houston, Texas. Compaq used Citizen Watch of Japan as manufacturer for its monochrome passive-matrix LCDs and as a second source for manufacturing of the entire systems. Citizen later became its sole manufacturer. Production of the LTE Lite was again moved from Citizen in Japan to Compaq's overseas plant in Singapore in 1994—Compaq citing wanting to fill vacant production lines in that plant, which also manufactured its Contura line of budget notebooks. The hard disk drives meanwhile were manufactured by Conner Peripherals.

The monochrome passive-matrix LCDs used in the LTE Lites were a co-development between Compaq and Citizen, who developed ways to reduce motion persistence ("ghosting") and crosstalk interference patterns ("bleeding") common in their super-twisted nematic displays. The monochrome active-matrix LCDs used in the Lite/25E and Lite 4/25E were manufactured by Hosiden. These were the same LCDs used by Apple in some entries of their PowerBook 100 series. Compaq were the only notebook manufacturer besides Apple to make use of active-matrix monochrome LCDs.

The LTE Lite/20 and LTE Lite/25 (including all submodels) used Intel's low-powered, portable-specific 80386SL processor. Compaq became the first laptop to feature Intel's later portable-specific 80486SL with the announcement of the LTE Lite 4/25 in November 1992.

== Reception ==
Reviewing the LTE Lite/25 and LTE Lite/20, Rick Ayre of PC Magazine called the two laptops "state-of-the-art" and high-priced, with a good display and keyboard but with compromised battery life compared to their predecessor, the LTE 386s/20. The LTE Lites were the top-performing 386 laptops in terms of graphics performance and among the top five of 386 laptops in terms of rendering graphics within Windows. The magazine also rated it among the fastest in its processor class in terms of memory speed and data processing but found its hard disk performance mediocre. Mitt Jones, also of PC Magazine, called the battery life "somewhat lackluster" but praised the versatility of the user-definable power consumption modes and found the display bright and sharp with minimal ghosting.

Michael Caton of PC Week, reviewing the LTE Lite/25, praised its battery life, case design, ease of use, and keyboard layout. PC Week's test lab compared it to Zenith Data Systems' MastersPort 386Le and found that the LTE Lite won out over the MastersPort under a stress test load: 3 hours compared to 2 hours and 11 minutes. Caton wrote that the power consumption modes were easy to configure. Similarly, the keyboard's hotkey functions allowed him to perform functions like disabling the external monitor or setting the speaker volume more easily compared to contemporaneous laptops, which required the user exit out to DOS and run a function utility. Caton called the case design "sturdy ... typical of Compaq notebooks" and the keyboard "well laid out". Caton found reservation with the keyboard's switches, which he deemed soft, and, the passive-matrix display, which exhibited ghosting most noticeably under Windows.

Andreas Uiterwuk and Siobhan Nash of InfoWorld, reviewing the LTE Lite/25C, rated the active-matrix color LCD well, with brilliant colors and a wide viewing angle, that exhibited no crosstalk interference patterns. The reviewers found the US$4,999 selling price "hefty" and found that it performed 9 percent slower than its monochrome counterpart but on par with its competitor in the active-matrix color notebook arena, NEC's UltraLite SL/25C. Nash and Earl Angus of the same publication, reviewing the LTE Lite/25E, called the laptop's $2,917 selling price "a pretty good deal" with its active-matrix monochrome display and equivalent processor to the LTE Lite/25C. Like Caton the reviewers found the keyboard too soft, the key travel too shallow, but they were impressed with its display, which exhibited "little bleeding".

Larry Blasko of the St. Petersburg Times, reviewing the LTE Lite 4/25E, found its relatively high price justified by its processing power, display, and keyboard and called the laptop overall a "first-rate job". In particular, Blasko found that the monochrome, active-matrix panel rendered "nice, crisp text and graphics" and that the keyboard had a "crisp touch" that held up under his heavy typing style. Blasko's unit scored 53.4 on the Norton index, meaning that it was over 50 times faster than a PC XT and 1.5 times faster than a 33-MHz Compaq Deskpro 386, which had a rating of 34.7. Blasko wrote that the LTE Lite was snappy running Windows 3.1.

== Legacy ==
The LTE Lite series proved very successful for Compaq, accounting for half of their entire notebook sales in 1993 alone. By the end of the year, it had become Compaq's flagship mobile computer, overtaking sales of their earlier luggable portables. Between 1992 and 1993, Citizen had manufactured between 20,000 and 25,000 LTE Lite units each month. The LTE Lite series was replaced by the LTE Elite series in March 1994. The LTE Elite series increased the memory, processors, and networking capabilities and moved the AC adapter to within the notebooks' chassis, eliminating the need for external bricks.

== Models ==
Compaq LTE Lite series lineup
Model	Release date	Processor	Clock speed (MHz)	LCD technology	LCD size (in.)	LCD resolution	Stock memory (max., in MB)	External cache (KB)	HDD (MB)	Internal trackball
LTE Lite/20 Model 40	January 1992	Intel 386SL	20	Passive-matrix monochrome	9.5	640×480	2 (18)	16	40	No
LTE Lite/20 Model 60	January 1992	Intel 386SL	20	Passive-matrix monochrome	9.5	640×480	2 (18)	16	60	No
LTE Lite/25 Model 60	January 1992	Intel 386SL	25	Passive-matrix monochrome	9.5	640×480	2 (18)	16	60	No
LTE Lite/25 Model 84	January 1992	Intel 386SL	25	Passive-matrix monochrome	9.5	640×480	2 (18)	16	84	No
LTE Lite/25 Model 120	January 1992	Intel 386SL	25	Passive-matrix monochrome	9.5	640×480	2 (18)	16	120	No
LTE Lite/25C Model 84	June 1992	Intel 386SL	25	Active-matrix color	8.4	640×480	4 (20)	64	84	Yes
LTE Lite/25C Model 120	June 1992	Intel 386SL	25	Active-matrix color	8.4	640×480	4 (20)	64	120	Yes
LTE Lite/25E Model 84	November 1992	Intel 386SL	25	Active-matrix monochrome	9.5	640×480	4 (20)	64	84	Yes
LTE Lite/25E Model 120	November 1992	Intel 386SL	25	Active-matrix monochrome	9.5	640×480	4 (20)	64	120	Yes
LTE Lite 4/25C Model 120	November 1992	Intel 486SL	25	Active-matrix color	8.4	640×480	4 (20)	8	120	Yes
LTE Lite 4/25C Model 209	November 1992	Intel 486SL	25	Active-matrix color	8.4	640×480	4 (20)	8	209	Yes
LTE Lite 4/25 Model 120	May 1993	Intel 486SL	25	Passive-matrix monochrome	9.5	640×480	4 (20)	8	120	Yes
LTE Lite 4/25E Model 120	May 1993	Intel 486SL	25	Active-matrix monochrome	9.5	640×480	4 (20)	8	120	Yes
LTE Lite 4/25E Model 209	May 1993	Intel 486SL	25	Active-matrix monochrome	9.5	640×480	4 (20)	8	209	Yes
LTE Lite 4/33C Model 120	May 1993	Intel 486SL	33	Active-matrix color	8.4	640×480	4 (20)	8	120	Yes
LTE Lite 4/33C Model 209	May 1993	Intel 486SL	33	Active-matrix color	8.4	640×480	4 (20)	8	209	Yes
