= Compaq LTE Elite =

Series of notebook-sized laptop comports

LTE Elite

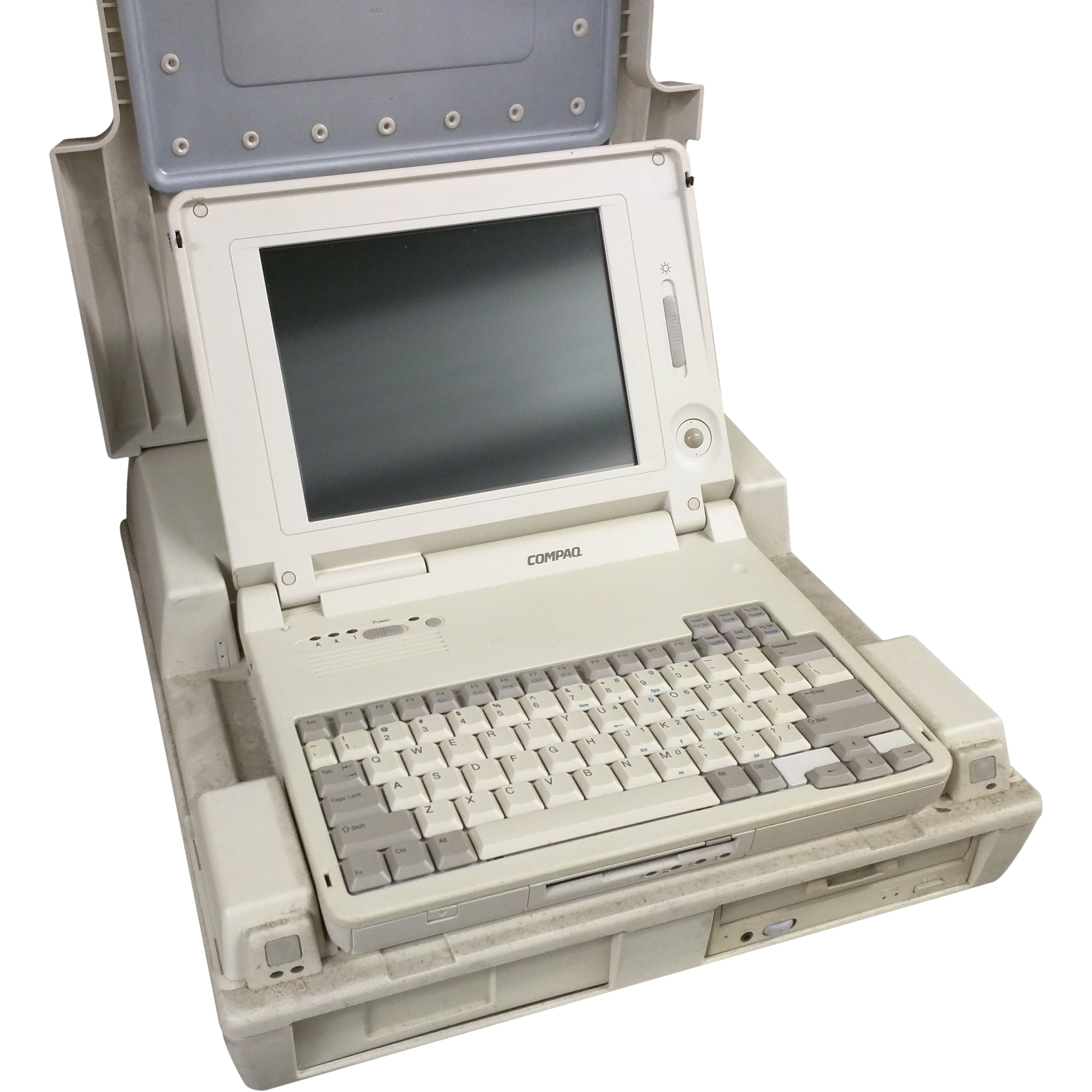
- LTE Elite 4/75CX in the SmartStation docking station
- Developer: Compaq
- Manufacturer: Compaq
- Product family: LTE
- Type: Laptop (notebook)
- Generation: Third
- Released: March 7, 1994; 32 years ago
- Availability: June 1994
- Lifespan: 1994–1996
- Operating system: MS-DOS; Microsoft Windows
- CPU: i486
- Predecessor: LTE Lite
- Successor: LTE 5000 series

The LTE Elite was a series of notebook-sized laptops under the LTE line manufactured by Compaq from 1994 to 1996. All laptops in the LTE Elite range sported Intel's i486 processors, from the 40 MHz DX2 to the 75 MHz DX4. The LTE Elite was the first notebook-sized laptop to house the AC adapter inside the case itself, eliminating the need to carry an external power brick. The LTE Elite line was replaced by the LTE 5000 series in 1995. Compaq ceased manufacturing the LTE Elite line in March 1996. Due to several recalls and a delayed rollout of the machines, the LTE Elite was overall a sales disappointment for Compaq, with rival Toshiba overtaking them as the top laptop maker in the United States in 1994 and 1995.

== Development and specifications ==
Compaq unveiled the LTE Elite series on March 7, 1994, and began shipping it in mid-June 1994 after achieving volume production. It was the third generation of LTE, a notebook family introduced five years earlier in 1989. Development for the LTE Elite was led by Jim Hartzog, general manager of Compaq's portable computer division. The LTE Elite directly replaced Compaq's LTE Lite series that they had introduced in 1992; the latter quickly became Compaq's flagship mobile computer, overtaking sales of their earlier luggable portables. The LTE Elite series was manufactured in large part in Compaq's facility in Singapore. Previously, Compaq had commissioned Citizen Watch of Japan to manufacture the LTE Lite series, but starting in mid-1993, Compaq had begun severing ties with Citizen in favor of focusing on optimizing their own Singapore plant. Certain surface-mount PCBs were manufactured in Compaq's factory in Erskine, while final assembly of each LTE Elite was completed in Houston. This marked the first time since 1991 that Compaq had produced their laptops domestically in the United States.

A major feature of the LTE Elite series was the integration of the AC adapter into the main body of the laptop. Instead of a connector for DC input, the laptop takes a standard "figure-8" connector for AC power. This eliminates the need for an external power brick and was the first time this approach had been done in a notebook-sized computer. Because of this approach, Compaq shipped two different versions of each model of the LTE Elite: 120 V models for North America, and 220 V models for Europe. Another major feature of the LTE Elite was the ability of its processors to be upgraded and replaced, owing to its use of a socket rather than a soldered-on surface-mount package typical of laptops in the mid-1990s. The laptops' hard drives are also easily removable by the end user with the press of a button; alternatively, the hard drive may be locked into the chassis with a security tab built into the drive's caddy. Additionally, all models in the LTE Elite line feature a built-in trackball located at the lower-right of the LCD housing—a holdover from late entries in the earlier LTE Lite family. The left- and right-click buttons are located on the reverse side of the housing.

The LTE Elite series was Compaq's first product with slots for PC Cards (known contemporaneously as PCMCIA cards, after the association who founded the card standard). Unlike other vendor's implementation of PC Cards, the LTE Elite's was largely plug and play, allowing cards to be removed and new cards to be inserted without rebooting the machine. Compaq worked closely with Microsoft to develop the necessary support drivers for plug-and-play PC Cards in Windows 3.1 and in Microsoft Chicago—the latter being Microsoft's beta codename for their next-generation operating system, Windows 95. VLSI Technology, whose largest customer at the time was Compaq, worked closely with the latter to design the PC Card controller ASIC.

Compaq introduced four new docking stations for the LTE Elite line: the SmartStation, the MiniStation/EN, the MiniStation/TR, and the OptiByte Media Station. The SmartStation was the second-most-expensive and feature-packed; like Apple's Duo Dock, the SmartStation loaded the LTE Elite into a rectangular, VCR-like slot, allowing the laptop to be used like a desktop computer, with an external monitor perched on top of the docking station. The SmartStation added two 5.25-inch drive bays, two ISA slots for IBM PC–compatible expansion cards, SCSI-2 ports for parallel peripherals and external storage, and Ethernet ports for networking. The MiniStation/EN and MiniStation/TR meanwhile were simple port replicators adding one of each of the aforementioned SCSI-2 ports and networking ports. The MiniStation/EN provided a Ethernet port, while the MiniStation/TR provided a Token Ring port. The OptiByte Media Station, meanwhile, was the most expensive but added a 16-bit sound card, a double-speed CD-ROM drive and built-in speakers, as well as providing a free ISA slot. This added sound synthesis capability to an otherwise silent laptop (barring the internal PC speaker). The OptiByte Media Station was designed and manufactured by AccuMem Systems and resold by Compaq.

The monochrome active-matrix LCD used in the LTE Elite 4/50E, first premiered in Compaq's earlier LTE Lite line, was manufactured by Hosiden. This was the same LCD used by Apple in some entries of their PowerBook 100 series. Compaq were the only notebook manufacturer besides Apple to make use of active-matrix monochrome LCDs. Compaq winded down production of the LTE Elite 4/50E after Hosiden's Kobe-based LCD factory was severely damaged in the Great Hanshin earthquake of January 1995, eliminating their future supply of monochrome active-matrix LCDs.

All entries in the LTE Elite line featured i486 processors, ranging from 40-MHz DX2s to 75-MHz Intel DX4s. A 100-MHz DX4 model was prototyped beginning in September 1994 and was slated for a March 1995 release. However, this model was ultimately shelved, Compaq instead releasing the LTE Elite 4/75 and LTE Elite 4/75CXL, with 75-MHz DX4s, that March. (Note: At least a couple prototypes of this unreleased 100-MHz DX4 model have survived, in the custody of vintage computer collectors.)

== Recalls ==
In late July 1994, only a month after having been shipped, three models of the LTE Elite line suffered from faulty VLSI PC Card controller chips that prevented slots from recognizing cards and that rejected cards shortly after the system recognized their insertion. Compaq halted production until the fall of that year when a new batch of controllers was produced; machines with the fault-free controller have an orange sticker on the door of the PC Card slot. This PC Card snafu was a major factor in Compaq's decision to cancel their Concerto tablet in August 1994.

In late November 1994, Compaq again briefly suspended production of the LTE Elite in their Houston factory after discovering a bug in their BIOS ROM that prevented the units from recognizing RAM upgrades over 16 MB. The ROMs were reflashed in the factory with the corrected firmware; meanwhile, customers of the LTE Elite were mailed floppy disks with a utility to patch their ROMs with the code corrections.

In late December 1994, Compaq issued a recall of all LTE Elites to their European dealers after a defect in the 220-V power supply units of European models led to catastrophic failures in 10 percent of units sold. The failures were ultimately blamed on defective electrolytic capacitors. The company meanwhile repurposed part of their Erskine facility for rapid replacement of the defective power supply units and BIOSes in unsold laptops, as well as laptops returned to Compaq for repair.

== Reception ==
Joe Abernathy of PC World gave the entire LTE Elite line high marks, writing that it "push[ed] beyond the basic requirements of mobile computing" and "move[d] the mobile computing standard forward". In particular, Abernathy applauded Compaq's execution of plug-and-play in their implementation of the PC Card slots: "It was a joy to actually swap cards in and out of an Elite and have everything continue to work as promised." Rex Farrance of the same publication also praised the LTE Elite line, rating it the best professional laptop in a lineup of 10 such laptops. In particular, Farrance singled out the LTE Elite 4/75CX for its processor and battery life, respectively rating 10 percent faster than other laptops in its class and lasting six-and-a-half hours on a single charge in an average use-case scenario. Farrance quibbled with the display's brightness slider, which failed to dim enough to his liking, and the monitor-mounted trackball, which worked intermittently in his experience.

Writing in PC Week, Michael Caton found the LTE Elite 4/75CX faster than the similarly equipped ThinkPad 755 from IBM and the Versa 75EC from NEC but found it second rate to Texas Instruments' TravelMate 4000E WinDX-4/75 and noted that DOS video performance was slower than its performance in Windows. He also found the lack of sound capability beyond the PC speaker "notably absent". Although he appreciated the integration of the AC adapter into the body of the laptop—"the convenience of carrying just the notebook and small power cord is instantly apparent ... the Elite is more convenient to carry than some of the so-called subnotebooks"—Caton deemed this a potential failure point for the entire system, although he noted that Compaq standard three-year warranty lessened the severity of this concern. Caton called the keyboard's actuation feel similarly "mushy" to its predecessors in the LTE range and disliked the mounting of the trackball on the display housing, finding it easy to tilt the display by accident and awkward to use for left-handed people; he also found the port door on the back eager to detach. Despite the screen being smaller than that of the ThinkPad 755, Caton called the LTE Elite 4/75CX's color-rendering and viewing angle "excellent".

Reviewing the LTE Elite 4/75CX, William P. Flanagan of PC Magazine called its integration of the AC adapter "the next logical step in minimizing the traveling executive's load" and that the addition of PCMCIA capabilities and the docking stations for the laptop which support hot-swapping heralded "the debut of plug-and-play capabilities in portable PCs". Judging from the magazine's in-house benchmarks, Flanagan found the 4/75CX an average performer in most respects, barring the Graphics WinMark score (which tests a computer's ability to draw Windows graphical elements), a score in which the laptop outperformed the majority of laptops tested by the magazine up to that point.

Dwight Silverman of the Houston Chronicle, reviewing the LTE Elite 4/75CX, praised the laptop's ergonomics, calling the keyboard's actuation feel snappy and its layout well-designed and appreciated the retention of the monitor-mounted trackball from the LTE Lite series. He found reservation with the latter though, finding the mouse cursor prone to "sticking" due to finish of the ball being too polished for the bearings to track onto it. He also found the built-in hard drive's seek times slow. Like Caton, Silverman bemoaned the lack of a built-in sound capability beyond the PC speaker. He called the laptop's processor speedy and the laptop's battery life good, despite the "notoriously power-hungry active-matrix display". Silverman ultimately could not recommend the laptop on account of its relatively steep 1994 street price of US$6,000. Marty Jerome of PC/Computing, also reviewing the LTE Elite 4/75CX, also balked at the laptop's price but applauded its higher-end features such as built-in SCSI and an upgradable processor and wrote that, on performance, "it competes with the best". Unlike Silverman, Jerome called the trackball "a relic from a bygone era" and a point against its usability.

Peter McWilliams of the Universal Press Syndicate, reviewing the LTE Elite 4/40CX, wrote that the integration of the pointing device and external AC adapter made for less items to potentially go missing while carrying the laptop from site to site and wrote that the monitor-mounted trackball, while it took time to get used to, was "brilliant" and ergonomic. He found the laptop's performance snappy, Norton Utilities's Sysinfo benchmark rating it as 78.8 times faster than the original IBM Personal Computer, the best rating he had hitherto seen from a laptop.

A reviewer for the British PC User found the LTE Elite 4/40CX's plug-and-play capability well thought out and approved of the laptop's expandability. The reviewer found its chassis slightly chunkier than its counterparts from other companies such as Toshiba and Gateway 2000 but wrote that the integration of the AC adapter balanced this out. The lack of advanced sound output and the implementation of the trackball were marks against it. Dennis Howlett of the same publication, reviewing the LTE Elite 4/75CX, echoed the previous reviewer's criticisms of the trackball but wrote that the keyboard was unparalleled in quality. In summary, he wrote that the LTE Elite's "solid reliability and high degree of performance should put it at the top of a shortlist for anyone needing serious power in any environment."

== Legacy ==
The LTE Elite was overall a disappointment for Compaq, the company poorly handling the rollout of the LTE Elite in 1994, according to the press at the time. For example, they discontinued the production of its predecessor the LTE Lite months before they were ready to ship the LTE Elite to customers. Combined with the recalls, this botched rollout contributed to a proportional shrinkage in Compaq's laptop market share, despite the company's total market share slightly increasing from 1993. Toshiba overtook Compaq as the top laptop maker in the United States in 1994 and 1995, helped along with their Satellite line of laptops. As a result of this upset, in early 1995, Compaq hired Inventec of Taiwan to co-design and manufacture in full the followup LTE 5000. The partnership not only hastened development of a successor but also gained Compaq access to Taiwan's more cutting-edge technologies in the field of mobile computer production.

== Models ==
Compaq LTE Elite series lineup
Model	Release date	Processor	Clock speed (MHz)	LCD technology	LCD size (in.)	LCD resolution	Stock memory (max., in MB)	HDD (MB)
LTE Elite 4/40C	March 1994	Intel i486DX2	40	Passive-matrix color	9.5	640×480	4 (20)	170
LTE Elite 4/50E	March 1994	Intel i486DX2	50	Active-matrix monochrome	9.5	640×480	8 (24)	250
LTE Elite 4/40CX	March 1994	Intel i486DX2	40	Active-matrix color	8.4	640×480	4 (20)	170 or 340
LTE Elite 4/50CX	March 1994	Intel i486DX2	50	Active-matrix color	9.5	640×480	8 (24)	340
LTE Elite 4/75C	March 1995	Intel i486DX4	75	Passive-matrix color	9.5	640×480	8 (32)	340 or 510
LTE Elite 4/75CX	March 1994	Intel i486DX4	75	Active-matrix color	9.5	640×480	4 (24)	340 or 510
LTE Elite 4/75CXL	March 1995	Intel i486DX4	75	Active-matrix color	10.4	640×480	8 (32)	510 or 810
LTE Elite 4/100CX	Unreleased	Intel i486DX4	100	Active-matrix color	10.4	640×480	8 (32)	720
