= Sony Vaio AX series =

Series of laptop computers created by Sony

The Vaio AX series was a range of multimedia notebook computers from Sony introduced in October 2005 running Windows XP Media Center Edition 2005. It replaced the A Series. It featured a 17" 16:10 widescreen LCD screen with 1440x900 resolution. It was replaced by the AR series.

Launch specs were Intel Pentium M 1.86 GHz, ATI Mobility Radeon X700 graphics, two 80GB hard drives, wireless, modem, Ethernet, remote control, 0.3 megapixel webcam, and hot-swappable TV tuner/DVD burner.

The AX weighed 8.8 pounds/4.0 kg.
