= NEC Versa =

Line of laptops sold by NEC

Versa

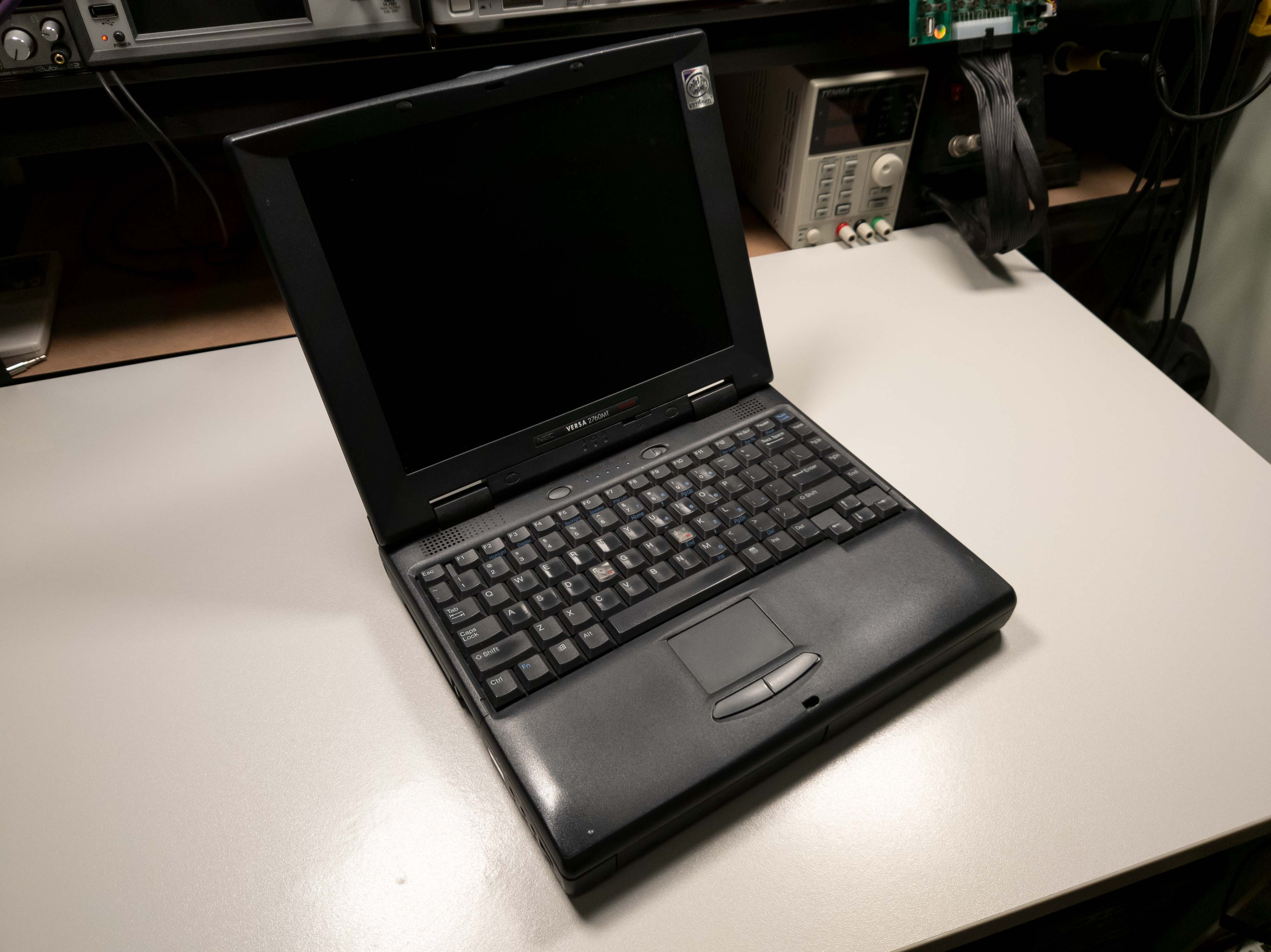
- Versa 2760MT
- Developer: NEC Corporation
- Manufacturer: NEC
- Type: Laptop
- Released: April 1993; 32 years ago
- Lifespan: 1993–2009
- Discontinued: March 2009; 16 years ago
- CPU: x86

The Versa was a line of laptop computers sold by the Japanese electronics conglomerate NEC Corporation from 1993 to 2009. It comprised many form factors of laptops, from conventional clamshell notebooks to pen-enabled convertibles featuring detachable displays, before the line was effectively discontinued in 2009 after NEC pulled out of the global market for personal computers.

== History ==
The Versa was unveiled in February 1993 with the UltraLite Versa; volume shipment of the notebook began in April 1993. This first model borrowed the namesake of NEC's influential earlier UltraLite family of "notebook"-sized laptop computers. The UltraLite Versa featured Intel's i486SL microprocessor clocked at 20 MHz, taking advantage of the latter's internal local bus for faster graphics processing (including displaying full-motion video) than typical notebooks of the time, such as the Compaq LTE and the Zenith MastersPort. The UltraLite Versa was pen-enabled, in that its display housing could be detached from the base of the clamshell casing and exchanged with ones featuring differing display technologies, including one with a stylus-driven touchscreen color display. The laptop's screen could also be attached to the base turned 180 degrees away from the viewer and folded over the keyboard, allowing the user to use the machine like a tablet. A docking station with two ISA expansion slots was sold as an option. NCR Corporation of the United States signed a deal with NEC to rebadge the Versa as the NCR Safari starting in September 1993.

NEC dropped the UltraLite branding for their Versa laptops starting with the Versa E (Enhanced) series in December 1993. Instead of the i486SL, models in this series of Versa feature Intel DX2 processors clocked at either 40 or 50 MHz; however, like its predecessor, the modularity of the display technology is retained. NEC followed up the Versa E series with the Versa M and the Versa V, all featuring incrementally improved i486 processors and other hardware, including a 16-mm clip-on trackball for a pointing device. In June 1994, they unveiled the Versa S series, a low-cost subnotebook version of the Versa lacking the modularity of its more expensive siblings (options like display technology had to be ordered ahead of time instead). In November 1994, the company unveiled the Versa P, the first in the line to feature Intel's Pentium processor. The Versa P series introduced various multimedia features, including a Sound Blaster–compatible sound chip; integrated speakers and an internal microphone; plugs for line in, stereo headphone, and external microphones.

In May 1995, NEC moved production of the Versa line from Japan to Shanghai, after establishing NEC Shanghai Computers, a joint venture with Changjiang Computer Union. The first two models of Versa produced in Shanghai—the Versa 2000 and the Versa 4000—abandoned the detachable display housings, optional touchscreens, and trackballs of the earlier models. In lieu of the latter two options for pointing devices was a built-in touchpad. The Versa 2000 series, released in June 1995, directly replaced the Versa S series and featured a 75-MHz Intel DX4 processor. The Versa 4000 series, released in July 1995, featured Pentium processors and a front-loading drive bay accepting a CD-ROM drive, a floppy drive, a second hard drive, or a second battery.

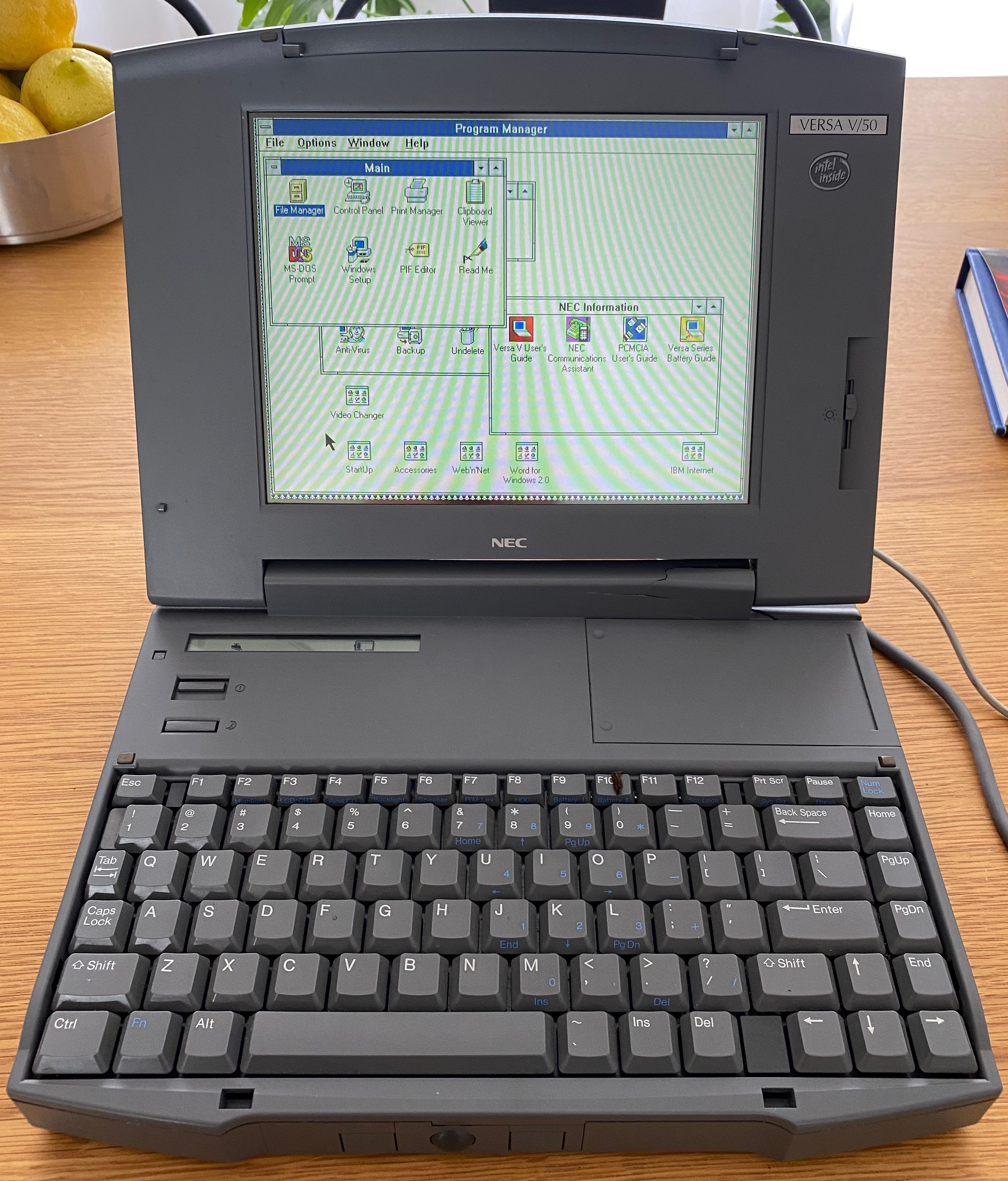
A 1995 Versa V/50 with a 50 MHz Intel 486-DX2 running Windows 3.1

NEC revamped the look of the Versa again with the SX and LX families in June 1998, featuring a thinner profile, weighing under 5 pounds (2.3 kg), and featuring Intel's Mobile Pentium II processors. Later entries in the Versa line featured Mobile Pentium IIIs, Pentium Ms, and eventually Core 2 Duos. In March 2009, NEC withdrew its personal computer products from markets outside Japan, effectively ending the Versa brand proper. The line continued in Japan, however, under the VersaPro name.
