= IQon Technologies =

Irish computer hardware company

iQon Technologies
- Founded: 1994
- Defunct: 2008
- Headquarters: Dundalk, County Louth, Ireland
- Key people: Dermot McElroy, original founder Ciaran O’Donoghue, Aidan Donnelly, Director
- Products: personal computers notebook computers consumer electronics
- Number of employees: 200
- Subsidiaries: iQon France

iQon Technologies Ltd was a manufacturer of personal and notebook computers and consumer electronics based in Dundalk, County Louth, Ireland. The company marketed computers through retailers across the United Kingdom and exported to Europe and North Africa.

== History ==
iQon Technologies was founded in 1994 under the name ROMAK Computers by Dermot McElroy, Lars Krull and Patrick Rooney.

The company was sold in 1997 to US worldwide distributor CHS ELECTRONICS Inc.

After the collapse of CHS ELECTRONICS Inc. in 2000, Dermot McElroy purchased the company back from the CHS Electronics liquidators.

In 2004, iQon secured a deal to supply computers for retailer Tesco to be sold in the United Kingdom and Ireland.

In 2006, the company established its iQon France subsidiary based in Toulon to expand sales across Europe.

As of 2007, iQon was Ireland's largest indigenous PC maker and largest PC exporter.

The company sought bankruptcy protection in November 2007 and went into liquidation in January 2008.

As of January 2008, iQon's call center and warranty service divisions continue to operate under a court-appointed liquidator and the company is up for sale.
