= Sony Vaio AR series =

The Sony VAIO AR series was a range of high-end multimedia notebook computers from Sony introduced in June 2006 as the first laptop with integrated Blu-ray drive (top model, costing $3,499 at launch - double the base model). It replaced the AX Series. It featured a 17" 16:10 widescreen LCD screen, with choice of 1440x900 or 1920x1200 resolutions (full HD 1080p capable). It was replaced by the AW series.

Launch specs were Intel Core Duo T2300, T2400 or T2500 CPUs running at 1.66, 1.86 or 2 GHz, Nvidia GeForce Go 7400 64MB, 7600 128MB, or 7600GT 256MB, with 160GB or RAID0 100Gb hard drives and 1GB of RAM. Later models incorporated Intel’s newer Core 2 Duo series alongside Nvidia’s GeForce 8xxx graphics cards, with Windows Vista replacing Windows XP Media Center Edition, and the RAM size was increased to 2GB.

These computers have a 17-inch widescreen LCD and weigh 8.8 pounds (4 kg); because of this, they are the largest of the Sony VAIO computers and are considered to be desktop replacement computers. Being somewhere between a notebook computer and a desktop computer, it has exceptional functionality, considering they have the specifications equivalent to that of a desktop computer. However, as a result of its large size, it has a battery life between 1.5 hours and three hours; this is considered low for a notebook computer but sufficient for a desktop replacement computer.

Included in some models is also a movie pack, which consists of four predesignated feature films saved on the harddrive.

== CTO Specifications ==
Processors:

- Intel Core 2 Duo Processor T7250 (2.0 GHz)
- Intel Core 2 Duo Processor T8100 (2.1 GHz)
- Intel Core 2 Duo Processor T8300 (2.4 GHz)
- Intel Core 2 Duo Processor T9300 (2.5 GHz)
- Intel Core 2 Duo Processor T9500 (2.6 GHz)

Operating Systems:

- Microsoft Windows XP Professional
- Microsoft Windows Vista Home Premium
- Microsoft Windows Vista Business
- Microsoft Windows Vista Ultimate

Memory:

- 2 GB DDR-SDRAM (DDR2-667, 1 GBx2)
- 3 GB DDR-SDRAM (DDR2-667, 2GBx1 + 1GBx1)
- 4 GB DDR-SDRAM (DDR2-667, 2 GBx2)

Hard Drives:

- 320 GB SATA Hard Disk Drive [5400rpm]
- 240 GB SATA Hard Disk Drive
- 400 GB SATA Hard Disk Drive
- 500 GB SATA Hard Disk Drive
- 600 GB SATA Hard Disk Drive
- 640 GB SATA Hard Disk Drive [2x 320GB]
- 400 GB SATA Hard Disk Drive [7200rpm]

Optical Disk Drives:

- DVD±R DL / DVD±RW / DVD-RAM Drive
- Blu-ray Disc Read Only Drive
- Blu-ray Disc Read and Write Drive

Displays

- LCD 17" WXGA+ (XBRITE-HiColor) 1440x900 resolution with integrated video camera
- LCD 17" WUXGA (XBRITE-HiColor) 1920x1200 resolution with integrated video camera

Graphics Cards

- NVIDIA GeForce 8600M GT GPU with Total Available Graphics Memory of 1279MB (max.) if 2GB System Memory is selected.
- NVIDIA GeForce 8600M GT GPU with Total Available Graphics Memory of 1791MB (max.) if 3GB or 4GB System Memory is selected.
- Video RAM: 512MB Dedicated Video RAM

Networking

- Wireless LAN: Intel PRO/Wireless 4965AGN Network Connection (802.11a/b/g/n) w/ Bluetooth Technology: Integrated Bluetooth Technology

In addition, a Sony VAIO AR has an optional ATI TV Wonder Digital Cable Tuner and an optional extended battery.
