= Compaq LTE =

Line of laptop computers

LTE

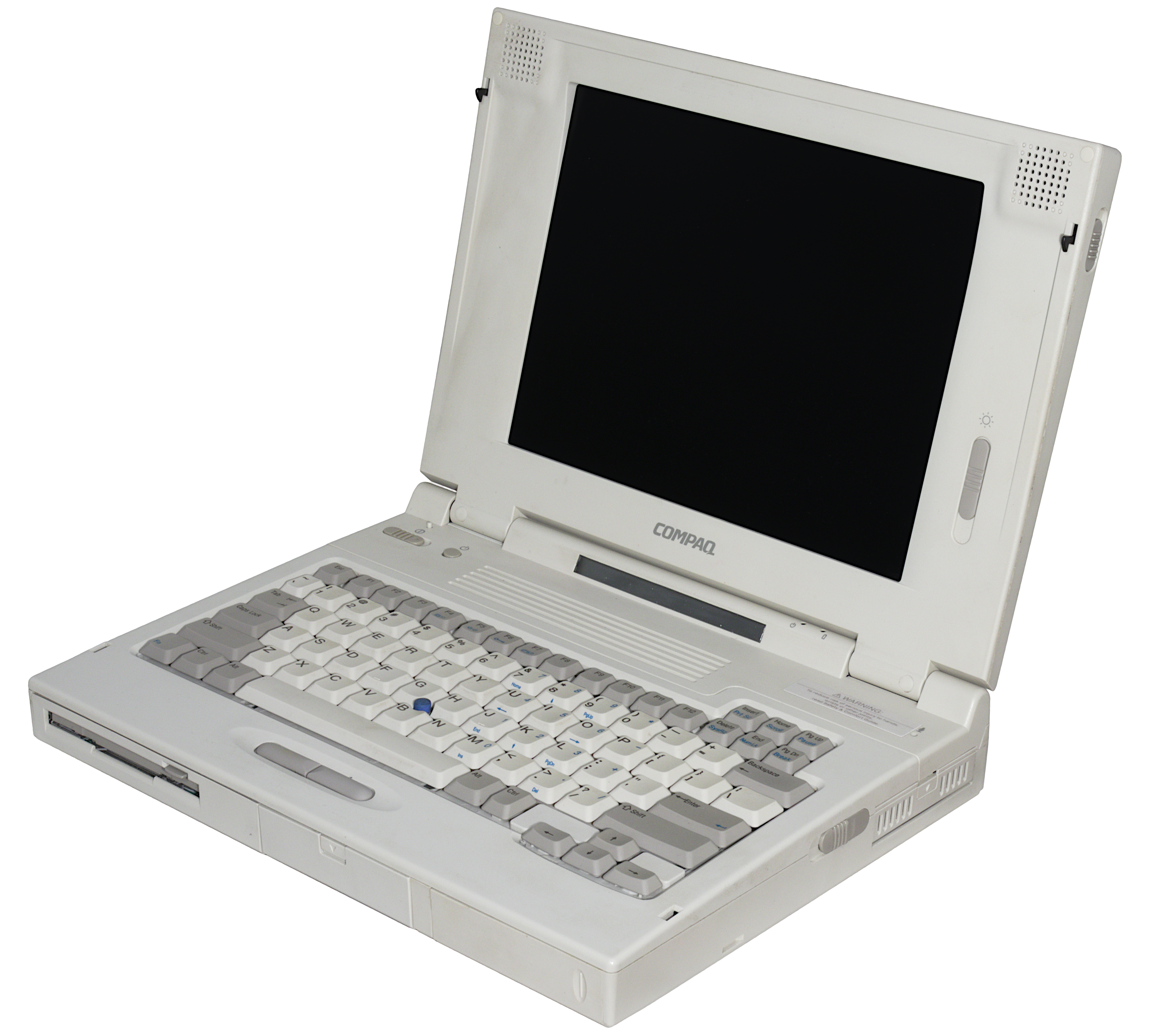
- LTE 5100, from 1995
- Developer: Compaq Computer Corporation
- Manufacturer: Compaq; Citizen Watch (certain models of LTE, LTE/286, and LTE Lite); Inventec (LTE 5000 series)
- Type: Laptop (notebook)
- Released: October 16, 1989; 37 years ago
- Lifespan: 1989–1997
- Discontinued: June 1997; 29 years ago
- Units sold: Over 2 million
- Predecessor: SLT
- Successor: Armada
- Related: Contura
- Website: compaq.com at the Wayback Machine (archived December 25, 1996)

The LTE is a line of notebook-sized laptops manufactured by Compaq Computer Corporation, introduced in 1989 and discontinued in 1997. It was the first notebook computer sold by Compaq and the first commercially successful notebook that was compatible with the IBM PC.

Development of the LTE line began in 1986; the company conceived it as their first attempt at a truly lightweight portable computer, aiming to replace their Portable and SLT lines. The first two models in the LTE line—the LTE and LTE/286—competed with other notebook computers such as NEC's UltraLite and Zenith's MinisPort. Whereas the UltraLite and MinisPort failed to gain much uptake due to their novel but nonstandard data storage technologies, the LTE succeeded on account of its use of the conventional 3.5-inch floppy drive and spinning hard drive, allowing users to transfer data to and from their desktop computers without any hassle. As well, Compaq began offering docking stations with the release of the LTE 386s/20 in 1990, providing performance comparable to then-current desktop machines.

The first LTEs received glowing praise among technology reviewers, who saw them as a revolution in mobile computing. The LTE was a direct influence on both Apple and IBM for the development of their own notebook computers. The first generation of LTE gave way to succeeding lines, including the LTE Lite in 1992, the LTE Elite in 1994, and the LTE 5000 series in 1995, all of which received mostly positive reviews. Compaq sold over two million units across the LTE's lifespan. They succeeded it with the Armada line in 1997.

== Background ==
The concept for the LTE line was originally drafted for Compaq in 1986 by Christopher J. Gintz, who was director of technical and planning development for the company at the time. Between this time and the unveiling of the LTE in October 1989, Compaq released the Portable 386 in 1987, another entry in Compaq's long line of portable computers that were compatible with IBM's Personal Computer platform. In 1988, they released the SLT/286, Compaq's first ever laptop.

The notebook computer emerged as a size category of portable computer starting with Epson's HX-20 in 1982. It was further popularized by Radio Shack's TRS-80 Model 100 in 1983. In terms of footprint, these notebooks measured roughly the size of a sheet of ANSI Letter paper—8.5 by 11 inches (215.9 by 279.4 mm)—making them easy to slip into an average-sized briefcase, and were relatively lightweight, making them easy to lift with one hand. The first notebook on the market compatible with the IBM PC was NEC's UltraLite in 1988. Weighing in at 4.4 pounds (2.0 kg), the UltraLite eschewed from conventional floppy and hard disk drives for software and data storage, in favor of proprietary ROM and RAM cards. This approach was technically impressive but led to slow adoption rates by consumers due to the difficulty of transferring data to and from IBM PCs and compatibles because of the lack of an internal floppy drive. Zenith Data Systems' notebook-sized MinisPort, released slightly after the UltraLite in 1989, did little to ameliorate this issue despite offering an internal floppy drive due to its non-standard, 2-inch format. Toshiba released the "book-sized" DynaBook J-3100 in July 1989. While commercially successful in Japan and featuring a 3.5-inch floppy drive, its footprint was still larger than letter paper by over an inch in both dimensions; it also lacked the option for a hard drive.

== Development and specifications ==
=== First generation ===
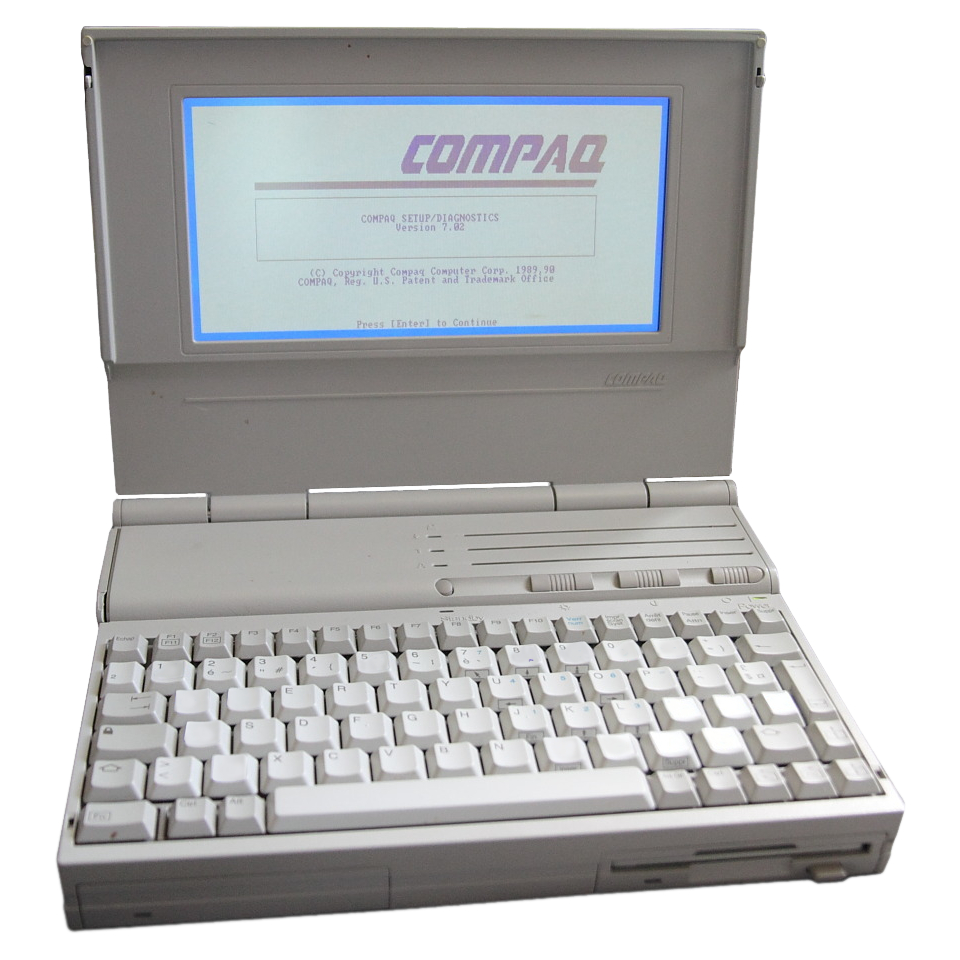
LTE/286, from 1989

The LTE and LTE/286, released on October 16, 1989, were true notebooks, each occupying exactly the footprint of ANSI Letter paper while measuring 1.9 inches (48 mm) thick. The LTE was the first true notebook on the market with conventional 3.5-inch floppy disk drives, as well as the first with optional hard disk drives. Compaq sourced their floppy drives from Citizen Watch and their hard drives from Conner Peripherals. Despite the drive's platters measuring 3.5 inches in diameter, as had been typical of desktop computers since the late 1980s, the drive's casing measured 0.75 inches (19 mm) thick—much thinner than the desktop drives of its day. This allowed Compaq to fit a spinning hard drive within the confines of the notebook-sized computer. Compaq offered the baseline, 8086-equipped LTE with either an internal 20-MB Conner hard drive or no hard drive at all (while still possessing a floppy drive). On the other hand, Compaq offered users the option to buy the 286-based LTE/286 with a 40-MB hard drive, a 20-MB hard drive, or no hard drive. (Note: Compaq also sold external 360-KB and 1.2-MB 5.25-inch floppy drives compatible with the LTE as means of removable storage.)

The LTE and LTE/286 feature monochrome LCD screens manufactured by Citizen Watch. The LCD measures 7.7 inches wide by 3.7 inches tall and is capable of displaying CGA graphics in four shades of gray. The screens contain a blue electroluminescent backlight, allowing users to read off the laptops in low-light conditions. The LTE sports an 80C86 clocked at 9.54 MHz, while the LTE/286 is based on the 80C286 clocked at 12 MHz. Both are respectively CMOS versions of Intel's 8086 and 80286 processors, intended for low-power applications such as battery-powered portable computers. (Note: For the LTE/286 only, the laptop supports an optional math co-processor, the 80C287.) The LTE and LTE/286 are equipped with 640 KB of internal RAM, expandable to 1.6 MB (for the LTE) or 2.6 MB (for the LTE/286) of RAM with the use of the use of 1- and 2-MB proprietary RAM cards that were sold by Compaq.

The Compaq LTE and LTE/286 were primarily manufactured by Compaq at their Houston campus. Compaq later signed a contract with Citizen to allow the latter to manufacture models of the LTE and LTE/286 for distribution in certain territories. This was the first time that Citizen, primarily a manufacturer of timepieces and precision electronics, had produced an entire computer system.

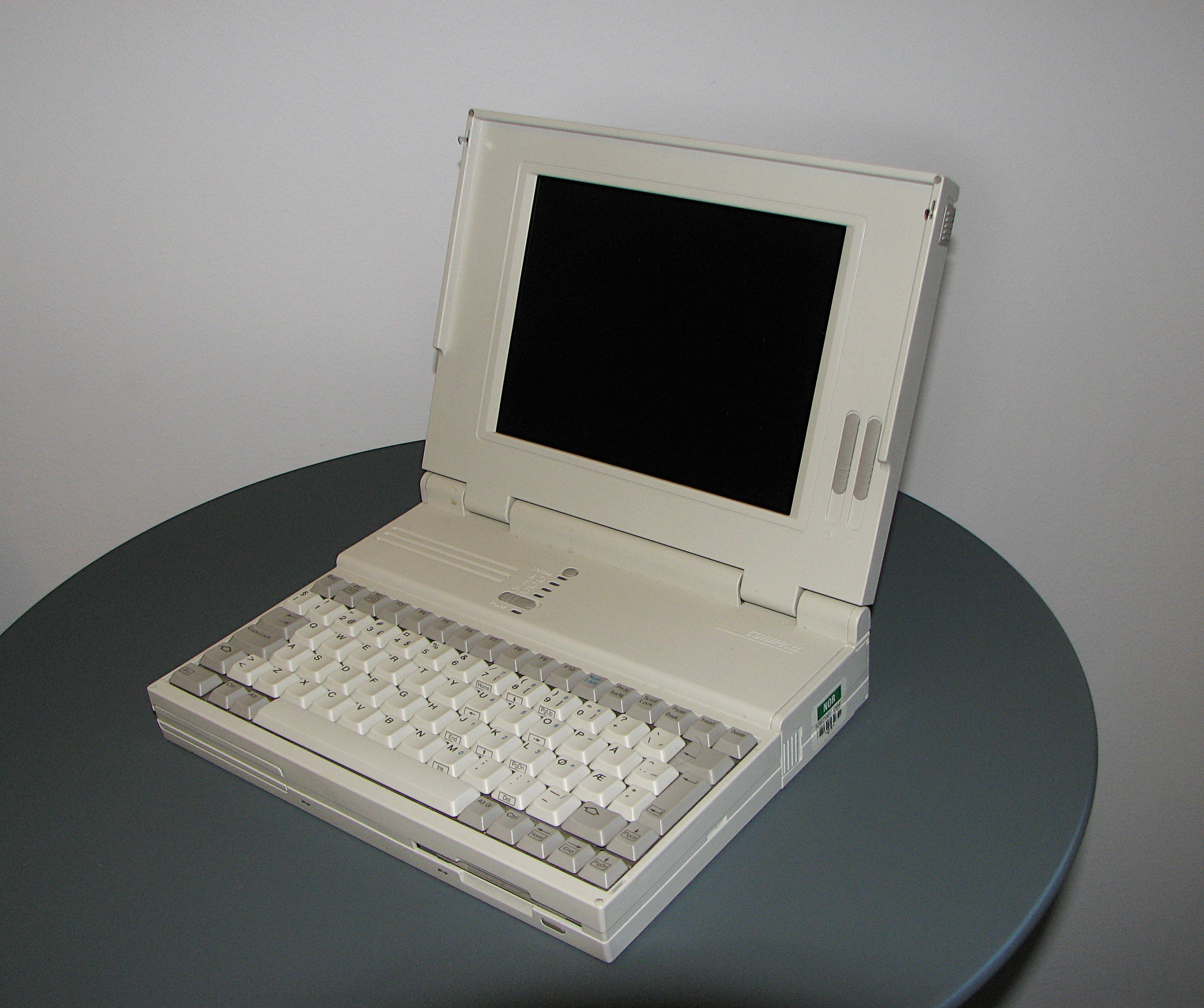
LTE 386s/20, from 1990

In October 1990 the company unveiled the LTE 386s/20, featuring the Intel 386SX processor clocked at 20 MHz. The stock memory was bumped up to 2 MB, expandable to 10 MB, with the same proprietary RAM cards as its predecessor; the number of card slots was increased to two for the LTE 386s/20. The LTE 386s/20 also replaced the stubbly display panel of the older models with a full-sized, 9-inch-diagonal LCD capable of displaying VGA graphics in sixteen shades of gray, in a return to form from the SLT. The designers behind the LTE 386s/20 made heavy use of rigid-flex interconnects between the different printed circuit boards, as well as custom ASICs, in order to save weight and reduce the amount of fragile wires and cables. Furthermore, the LTE 386s/20 was the first of Compaq's laptops to use Conner's portable-oriented hard drives, whose platter diameters measured 2.5 inches across as opposed to 3.5 inches across.

=== LTE Lite ===
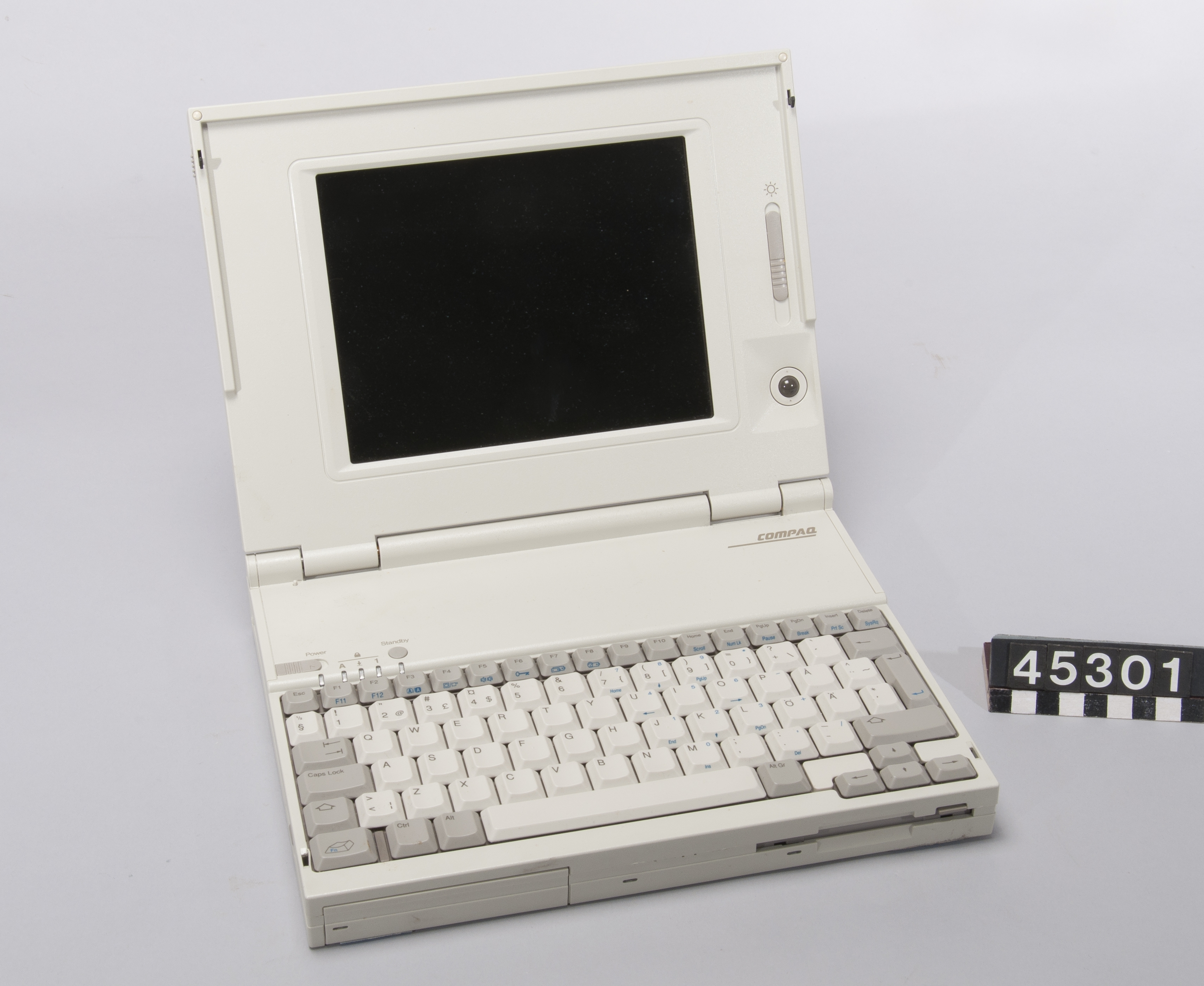
LTE Lite 4/33C, from 1993

The LTE Lite, released in January 1992, improved the battery life and quality of its predecessors' LCD panels while reducing weight. The LTE Lite/20 and LTE Lite/25 introduced suspend and hibernation modes, as well as a BIOS password and a Kensington slot for added security. Starting with the LTE Lite/25C and LTE Lite/25E, a trackball was built into the display housing on the right side, with the left- and right-click buttons on the reverse side of the housing. The LTE Lite/20 and LTE Lite/25 used Intel's low-powered, portable-specific 80386SL processor. The LTE Lite 4/25, announced in November 1992, was the first laptop to feature Intel's later portable-specific i486SL.

Manufacturing of the LTE Lites was initially performed at Compaq's plant in Houston, Texas. As with the preceding LTEs, Compaq used Citizen Watch of Japan as manufacturer for its monochrome passive-matrix LCDs and as a second source for manufacturing of the entire systems. Citizen later became its sole manufacturer. Meanwhile, Compaq purchased the monochrome active-matrix panels used in the Lite/25E and Lite 4/25E from Hosiden. (Note: These were the same LCDs used by Apple in some entries of their PowerBook 100 series. Compaq were the only notebook manufacturer besides Apple to make use of active-matrix monochrome LCDs.) Production of the LTE Lite was again moved from Citizen in Japan to Compaq's overseas plant in Singapore in 1994—Compaq citing wanting to fill vacant production lines in that plant, which also manufactured its Contura line of budget notebooks. The LTE Lite sold very well and quickly became Compaq's flagship mobile computer, overtaking sales of their earlier luggable portables.

=== LTE Elite ===
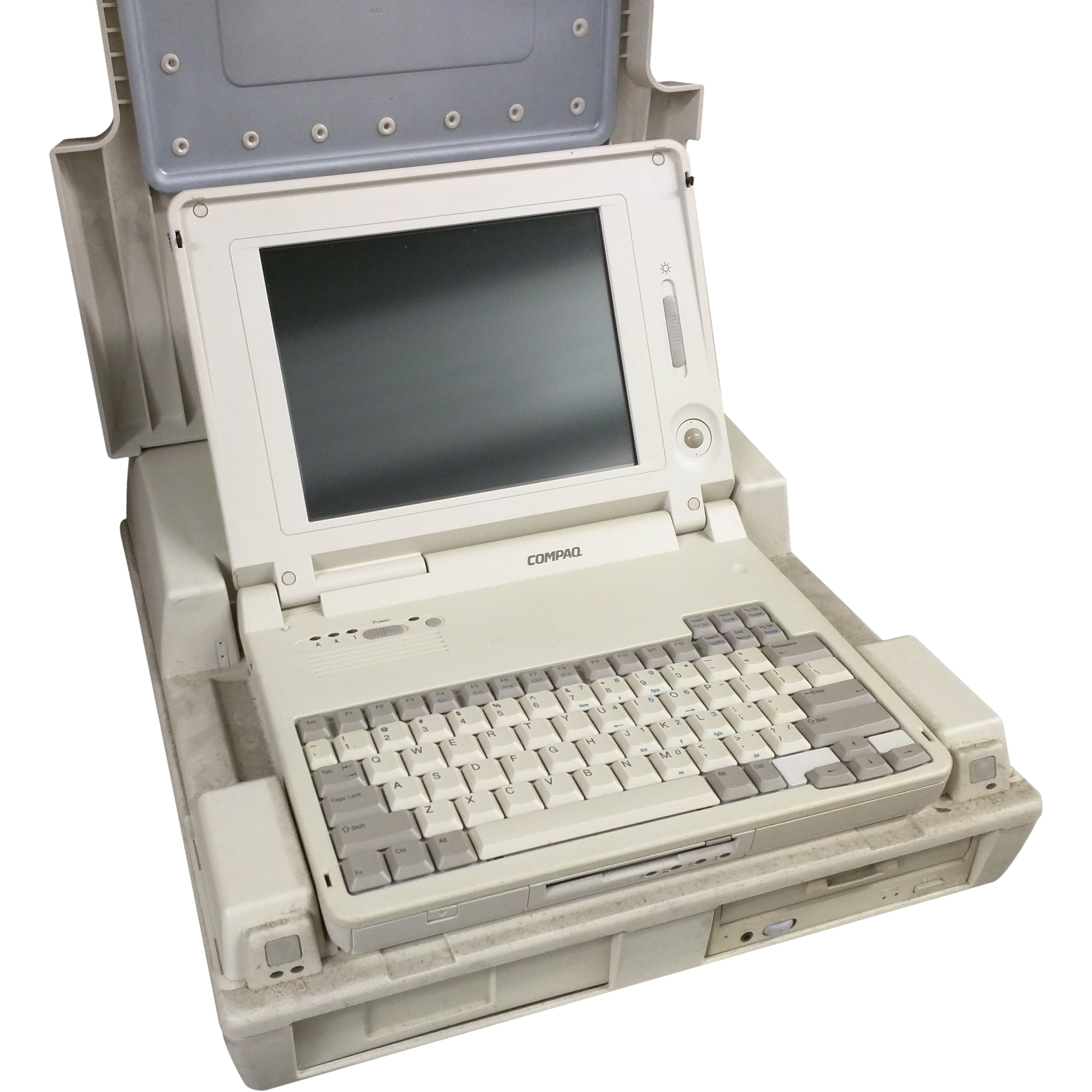
LTE Elite 4/75 CX, from 1994, in the SmartStation docking station

The LTE Elite series, released in March 1994, was Compaq's first product with slots for PC Cards (known contemporaneously as PCMCIA cards, after the association who founded the card standard). Unlike other vendor's implementation of PC Cards, the LTE Elite's was largely plug and play, allowing cards to be removed and new cards to be inserted without rebooting the machine. Compaq worked closely with Microsoft to develop the necessary support drivers for plug-and-play PC Cards in Windows 3.1 and the forthcoming Windows 95. VLSI Technology, whose largest customer at the time was Compaq, worked closely with the latter to design the PC Card controller ASIC. The LTE Elite also integrated the AC adapter into the main body of the laptop, eliminating the need for an external power brick. This was the first time this approach had been done in a notebook-sized computer. Another new feature of the LTE Elite was the ability of its processors to be upgraded and replaced, owing to its use of a socket rather than a soldered-on surface-mount package typical of laptops in the mid-1990s. The laptops' hard drives are also easily removable by the end user with the press of a button and can also be locked into the chassis with a security tab built into the drive's caddy. The LTE Elite retained the built-in trackball of the LTE Lite.

The LTE Elite series was manufactured in large part in Compaq's facility in Singapore. Certain surface-mount PCBs were manufactured in Compaq's factory in Erskine, while final assembly of each LTE Elite was completed in Houston. The LTE Elite line was plagued with manufacturing issues and technical faults, leading to several recalls. These factors and more contributed to a proportional shrinkage in Compaq's laptop market share, despite the company's total PC market share slightly increasing from 1993. In 1994, Toshiba overtook Compaq as the top manufacturer of laptops in the United States, helped along with their Satellite line of laptops.

=== LTE 5000 series ===
The LTE 5000 series, released in September 1995, was a top-to-bottom redesign. The last in the LTE line, the LTE 5000 series was the debut of Intel's multimedia-oriented Pentium processor in a Compaq laptop. It was also Compaq's first laptop with built-in 16-bit audio synthesis and playback (beyond the PC speaker); hardware acceleration for video; and an infrared port for communicating with PDAs. An optional MPEG decoder card also allowed the laptop to stream MPEG video in real-time as well as output video to television sets and projectors. Compaq abandoned the ambitious internal AC adapter of the Elite line in favor of the familiar power brick. In its stead was what Compaq termed the MultiBay: a multipurpose, hot-swappable expansion slot in the front of the machine that allowed users to slot in a floppy drive, a CD-ROM drive (a first for the LTE line), a second hard drive for more disk storage, or a second battery for frequent travelers. The LTE 5000 series also abandoned the monitor-mounted trackballs of older models in favor of an implementation of IBM's keyboard-mounted pointing stick technology.

Because of the disappointing performance of the LTE Elite, Compaq hired Inventec of Taiwan to co-design and manufacture in full the LTE 5000 series. The partnership not only hastened development of a successor but also gained Compaq access to Taiwan's more cutting-edge technologies in the field of mobile computer production. It was the first time in several years that Compaq relied on an outside company to design a portable computer of theirs and was the first machine Compaq had manufactured entirely in Taiwan.

== Docking stations ==
The LTE range was marketed as a desktop replacement; with its optional docking stations, it allowed peripherals to be permanently connected. The LTE laptop would be simply removed from the docking station to be used on the go and then docked to use in the office.

The LTE 386s/20 was the first LTE offered with an optional docking station, the Desktop Expansion Base, allowing the computer to be used more or less like a desktop computer. The docking station added a pair of full-length, 16-bit ISA slots to the machine and two 5.25-inch drive bays. Compaq shipped the Desktop Expansion Base with a VGA monitor and a standard desktop keyboard. The docking station connected to the back of the LTE 386s/20 via a new specialized connector on the rear of the laptop. Compaq also sold an internal CD-ROM adapter for the LTE 386s/20 that fits into its modem expansion slot, allowing the computer to be used with an optional external CD-ROM drive, making it one of the first laptops to natively support CD-ROM.

Compaq introduced four new docking stations for the LTE Elite line: the SmartStation, the MiniStation/EN, the MiniStation/TR, and the OptiByte Media Station. The SmartStation was the second-most-expensive and feature-packed; like Apple's Duo Dock, the SmartStation loaded the LTE Elite into a rectangular, VCR-like slot, allowing the laptop to be used like a desktop computer, with an external monitor perched on top of the docking station. The SmartStation added two 5.25-inch drive bays, two ISA slots for IBM PC–compatible expansion cards, SCSI-2 ports for parallel peripherals and external storage, and Ethernet ports for networking. The MiniStation/EN and MiniStation/TR meanwhile were simple port replicators adding one of each of the aforementioned SCSI-2 ports and networking ports. The MiniStation/EN provided a Ethernet port, while the MiniStation/TR provided a Token Ring port. The OptiByte Media Station, meanwhile, was the most expensive but added a 16-bit sound card, a double-speed CD-ROM drive and built-in speakers, as well as providing a free ISA slot. This added sound synthesis capability to an otherwise silent laptop (barring the internal PC speaker). The OptiByte Media Station was designed and manufactured by AccuMem Systems and resold by Compaq.

For the LTE 5000 series, Compaq offered the MultiBay Expansion Base, a full-feature docking station that added several other MultiBay units to the machine, on top of additional PC Cards and an Ethernet port. Compaq later augmented it in the form of the MultiBay-ISA Expansion Base, which added an ISA expansion slot.

== Sales and reception ==
From its introduction in 1989 to its discontinuation in 1997, Compaq sold over two million units of the entire LTE lineup, generating over US$1.5 billion in revenue for the company. The company sold the first 100,000 units of the LTE in December 1990, a little over a year after its introduction. The LTE Lite in particular sold very well for Compaq, Citizen manufacturing between 20,000 and 25,000 LTE Lite units each month between 1992 and 1993.

The first generation of LTE received glowing praise in the computing press, where multiple reviewers dubbed the machines breakthroughs in mobile computing. Mitt Jones of PC Magazine called the LTE and LTE/286, "without reservation, the most exciting and usable laptops on the market", albeit expensive at launch. Of the 80C86-based LTE, Jones wrote called the machine "somewhat miraculous ... In the same way the UltraLite seemed impossible for its size [in 1988], the LTE seems impossible now". Fredric Burke of the same publication, reviewing the LTE/286 a year after its release, called it "the class act in its field", praising its expandability, the legibility of the LCD, and the performance of the battery. Both PC Magazine and InfoWorld rated the LTE 386s/20 the fastest 386-class notebook those magazines had reviewed up to that point in early 1991.

Critics rated the initial LTE Lites among the top-performing 386 laptops in terms of graphics performance and among the top five of 386 laptops in terms of rendering graphics within Windows. The battery life of these machines received mixed assessments, however, as did the feeling of the keyboard switches and the quality of the passive-matrix LCDs. Reviewers preferred the active-matrix LCDs of the later LTE Lites, which they gave high marks for their greater viewing angles and sharpness.

Despite the LTE Elite's technical issues, the lineup received generally positive reviews from the technology press, with PC World writing that the LTE Elites "push[ed] beyond the basic requirements of mobile computing" and "move[d] the mobile computing standard forward". Critics generally appreciated the convenience of the integrated AC adapter, with PC Week writing that "the convenience of carrying just the notebook and small power cord is instantly apparent ... the Elite is more convenient to carry than some of the so-called subnotebooks". Multiple reviewers also judged the battery life of the LTE Elite an improvement over the LTE Lite. Some considered the LTE Elite too expensive on launch.

The LTE 5000 series' redesigned chassis and added multimedia capabilities received high marks. Dwight Silverman of the Houston Chronicle dubbed the machines "an everything-but-the-kitchen-sink approach to computer design [that] virtually bludgeons the competition with a mass of features". Many reviewers found the active-matrix LCDs of the higher-end models uncharacteristically dim, due to Compaq coating their polarizers with a dark film intended to increase contrast when looked at straight-on while reducing visibility from far angles. Compaq replaced the backlight inverter of successor models with a higher-voltage unit in response to this criticism.

== Legacy ==
The Compaq LTE represented the first commercially successful IBM PC–compatible notebook computer, significantly accelerating the development of the early notebook industry. Compaq's market success was largely driven by the integration of both a 3.5-inch floppy disk drive and a standard spinning hard disk drive on premium models. The floppy drive facilitated seamless data transfer with desktop systems, while the hard disk drive provided substantially larger storage capacities than the solid-state media available at the time.

The unexpected success of the LTE line was a major factor in the development of notebook computers at both Apple and IBM. Apple released their first laptop, the Macintosh Portable, in September 1989—a little over a month before the LTE debuted. While in development longer than the LTE and with a far larger sales backlog, the LTE outperformed the Macintosh Portable in the marketplace by an order of magnitude due to customer preference for the LTE's smaller footprint and lower weight. In response, Apple developed what would become the PowerBook in 1990. Likewise, the LTE also spurred IBM to rush the development of a smaller laptop to compete with Compaq. This initiative eventually bore the PS/2 Model L40 SX in 1991, a predecessor to the ThinkPad.

Compaq began retiring the LTE line with the 5000 series after introducing the Armada line in 1996. The final LTE 5000 models rolled off the line in the middle of June 1997. The Armada series marked the return of Compaq manufacturing their own laptops; following the end of the LTE 5000 series, Compaq severed ties with Inventec.

== Models ==
Compaq LTE series lineup
| Series | Model | Release date | Processor | Clock speed (MHz) | LCD technology | LCD size (in.) | LCD resolution | Stock memory (max.) | External cache (KB) | HDD | Internal pointing device | Notes/ref(s). |
|---|---|---|---|---|---|---|---|---|---|---|---|---|
| LTE | Model 1 | October 1989 | Intel 8086 | 9.54 | Passive-matrix monochrome | 8.8 | 640×200 | 640 KB (1.6 MB) | | None | None | (Note: Equipped with only a single 3.5-inch, 1.44 MB floppy disk drive) (Note: RAM expandable through proprietary memory cards) |
| LTE | Model 20 | October 1989 | Intel 8086 | 9.54 | Passive-matrix monochrome | 8.8 | 640×200 | 640 KB (1.6 MB) | | 20 MB | None | |
| LTE/286 | Model 1 | October 1989 | Intel 80286 | 12 | Passive-matrix monochrome | 8.8 | 640×200 | 640 KB (2.6 MB) | | None | None | |
| LTE/286 | Model 20 | October 1989 | Intel 80286 | 12 | Passive-matrix monochrome | 8.8 | 640×200 | 640 KB (2.6 MB) | | 20 MB | None | |
| LTE/286 | Model 40 | October 1989 | Intel 80286 | 12 | Passive-matrix monochrome | 8.8 | 640×200 | 640 KB (2.6 MB) | | 40 MB | None | |
| LTE 386s/20 | Model 30 | October 1990 | Intel i386SX | 20 | Passive-matrix monochrome | 9 | 640×480 | 2 MB (10 MB) | 64 | 30 MB | None | |
| LTE 386s/20 | Model 60 | October 1990 | Intel i386SX | 20 | Passive-matrix monochrome | 9 | 640×480 | 2 MB (10 MB) | 64 | 30 MB | None | |
| LTE 386s/20 | Model 84 | November 1991 | Intel i386SX | 20 | Passive-matrix monochrome | 9 | 640×480 | 2 MB (10 MB) | 64 | 30 MB | None | |
| LTE Lite | 20 Model 40 | January 1992 | Intel i386SL | 20 | Passive-matrix monochrome | 9.5 | 640×480 | 2 MB (18 MB) | 16 | 40 MB | None | |
| LTE Lite | 20 Model 60 | January 1992 | Intel i386SL | 20 | Passive-matrix monochrome | 9.5 | 640×480 | 2 MB (18 MB) | 16 | 60 MB | None | |
| LTE Lite | 25 Model 60 | January 1992 | Intel i386SL | 25 | Passive-matrix monochrome | 9.5 | 640×480 | 2 MB (18 MB) | 16 | 60 MB | None | |
| LTE Lite | 25 Model 84 | January 1992 | Intel i386SL | 25 | Passive-matrix monochrome | 9.5 | 640×480 | 2 MB (18 MB) | 16 | 84 MB | None | |
| LTE Lite | 25 Model 120 | January 1992 | Intel i386SL | 25 | Passive-matrix monochrome | 9.5 | 640×480 | 2 MB (18 MB) | 16 | 120 MB | None | |
| LTE Lite | 25C Model 84 | June 1992 | Intel i386SL | 25 | Active-matrix color | 8.4 | 640×480 | 4 MB (20 MB) | 64 | 84 MB | Trackball | |
| LTE Lite | 25C Model 120 | June 1992 | Intel i386SL | 25 | Active-matrix color | 8.4 | 640×480 | 4 MB (20 MB) | 64 | 120 MB | Trackball | |
| LTE Lite | 25E Model 84 | November 1992 | Intel i386SL | 25 | Active-matrix monochrome | 9.5 | 640×480 | 4 MB (20 MB) | 64 | 84 MB | Trackball | |
| LTE Lite | 25E Model 120 | November 1992 | Intel i386SL | 25 | Active-matrix monochrome | 9.5 | 640×480 | 4 MB (20 MB) | 64 | 120 MB | Trackball | |
| LTE Lite | 4/25C Model 120 | November 1992 | Intel i486SL | 25 | Active-matrix color | 8.4 | 640×480 | 4 MB (20 MB) | 8 | 120 MB | Trackball | |
| LTE Lite | 4/25C Model 209 | November 1992 | Intel i486SL | 25 | Active-matrix color | 8.4 | 640×480 | 4 MB (20 MB) | 8 | 209 MB | Trackball | |
| LTE Lite | 4/25 Model 120 | May 1993 | Intel i486SL | 25 | Passive-matrix monochrome | 9.5 | 640×480 | 4 MB (20 MB) | 8 | 120 MB | Trackball | |
| LTE Lite | 4/25E Model 120 | May 1993 | Intel i486SL | 25 | Active-matrix monochrome | 9.5 | 640×480 | 4 MB (20 MB) | 8 | 120 MB | Trackball | |
| LTE Lite | 4/25E Model 209 | May 1993 | Intel i486SL | 25 | Active-matrix monochrome | 9.5 | 640×480 | 4 MB (20 MB) | 8 | 209 MB | Trackball | |
| LTE Lite | 4/33C Model 120 | May 1993 | Intel i486SL | 33 | Active-matrix color | 8.4 | 640×480 | 4 MB (20 MB) | 8 | 120 MB | Trackball | |
| LTE Lite | 4/33C Model 209 | May 1993 | Intel i486SL | 33 | Active-matrix color | 8.4 | 640×480 | 4 MB (20 MB) | 8 | 209 MB | Trackball | |
| LTE Elite | 4/40C | March 1994 | Intel i486DX2 | 40 | Passive-matrix color | 9.5 | 640×480 | 4 MB (20 MB) | | 170 MB | Trackball | |
| LTE Elite | 4/50E | March 1994 | Intel i486DX2 | 50 | Active-matrix monochrome | 9.5 | 640×480 | 8 MB (24 MB) | | 250 MB | Trackball | |
| LTE Elite | 4/40CX | March 1994 | Intel i486DX2 | 40 | Active-matrix color | 8.4 | 640×480 | 4 MB (20 MB) | | 170 MB or 340 MB | Trackball | |
| LTE Elite | 4/50CX | March 1994 | Intel i486DX2 | 50 | Active-matrix color | 9.5 | 640×480 | 8 MB (24 MB) | | 340 MB | Trackball | |
| LTE Elite | 4/75C | March 1995 | Intel i486DX4 | 75 | Passive-matrix color | 9.5 | 640×480 | 8 MB (32 MB) | | 340 MB or 510 MB | Trackball | |
| LTE Elite | 4/75CX | March 1994 | Intel i486DX4 | 75 | Active-matrix color | 9.5 | 640×480 | 4 MB (24 MB) | | 340 MB or 510 MB | Trackball | |
| LTE Elite | 4/75CXL | March 1995 | Intel i486DX4 | 75 | Active-matrix color | 10.4 | 640×480 | 8 MB (32 MB) | | 510 MB or 810 MB | Trackball | |
| LTE Elite | 4/100CX | Unreleased | Intel i486DX4 | 100 | Active-matrix color | 10.4 | 640×480 | 8 MB (32 MB) | | 720 MB | Trackball | |
| 5000 series | LTE 5000 Model 510 CSTN | September 1995 | Intel Pentium | 75 | Passive-matrix color | 10.4 | 640×480 | 8 MB or 16 MB (80 MB) | | 510 MB | Pointing stick | |
| 5000 series | LTE 5000 Model 810 CSTN | September 1995 | Intel Pentium | 75 | Passive-matrix color | 11.3 | 640×480 | 8 MB or 16 MB (80 MB) | | 810 MB | Pointing stick | |
| 5000 series | LTE 5000 Model 810 CTFT | September 1995 | Intel Pentium | 75 | Active-matrix color | 10.4 | 640×480 | 8 MB or 16 MB (80 MB) | | 810 MB | Pointing stick | |
| 5000 series | LTE 5100 Model 810 CTFT | September 1995 | Intel Pentium | 90 | Active-matrix color | 10.4 | 800×600 | 8 MB or 16 MB (80 MB) | | 810 MB | Pointing stick | |
| 5000 series | LTE 5100 Model 810 CD CTFT | September 1995 | Intel Pentium | 90 | Active-matrix color | 10.4 | 800×600 | 8 MB or 16 MB (80 MB) | | 810 MB | Pointing stick | |
| 5000 series | LTE 5150 Model 810 CSTN 800×600 | June 1996 | Intel Pentium | 100 | Passive-matrix color | 11.3 | 800×600 | 8 MB or 16 MB (80 MB) | | 810 MB | Pointing stick | |
| 5000 series | LTE 5200 Model 1350 CTFT | September 1995 | Intel Pentium | 120 | Active-matrix color | 10.4 | 800×600 | 8 MB or 16 MB (80 MB) | | 1.35 GB | Pointing stick | |
| 5000 series | LTE 5250 Model 810 CTFT 800×600 | June 1996 | Intel Pentium | 120 | Active-matrix color | 10.4 | 800×600 | 8 MB or 16 MB (80 MB) | | 810 MB | Pointing stick | |
| 5000 series | LTE 5280 Model 810 CTFT 800×600 | April 1996 | Intel Pentium | 120 | Active-matrix color | 11.3 | 800×600 | 8 MB or 16 MB (80 MB) | | 810 MB | Pointing stick | |
| 5000 series | LTE 5280 Model 1350 CTFT 800×600 | April 1996 | Intel Pentium | 120 | Active-matrix color | 11.3 | 800×600 | 8 MB or 16 MB (80 MB) | | 1.35 GB | Pointing stick | |
| 5000 series | LTE 5300 Model 1350 CTFT 800×600 | April 1996 | Intel Pentium | 133 | Active-matrix color | 12.1 | 800×600 | 8 MB or 16 MB (80 MB) | | 1.35 GB | Pointing stick | |
| 5000 series | LTE 5300 Model 2160 CTFT 800×600 | April 1996 | Intel Pentium | 133 | Active-matrix color | 12.1 | 800×600 | 8 MB or 16 MB (80 MB) | | 2.16 GB | Pointing stick | |
| 5000 series | LTE 5380 Model 2160 CTFT 1024×768 | November 1996 | Intel Pentium | 133 | Active-matrix color | 12.1 | 1024×768 | 8 MB or 16 MB (80 MB) | | 2.16 GB | Pointing stick | |
| 5000 series | LTE 5400 Model 2160 CTFT 800×600 | November 1996 | Intel Pentium | 150 | Active-matrix color | 12.1 | 800×600 | 8 MB or 16 MB (80 MB) | | 2.16 GB | Pointing stick | |
