= Sony Vaio AW series =

The Vaio AW series is a discontinued range of high-end multimedia laptop computers from Sony introduced in September 2008, replacing the AR Series. They feature an 18.4-inch 16:9 screen with 1680×945 or LED-backlit 1920×1080 (1080p) screen, NVidia GeForce 9300M GS 256 MB or 9600M GT 512 MB graphics, Blu-ray drive (Blu-ray burner option), Intel 5100AGN wireless chipset, Core 2 Duo P or T CPUs and a 1.3-megapixel webcam, optional RAID SSD storage (in addition to the hard drive) and HDMI output.

The AW weighs 3.7 kg/8.2 lb.
