= Compaq SLT =

Line of laptop computers made in the 1980s and 1990s

SLT
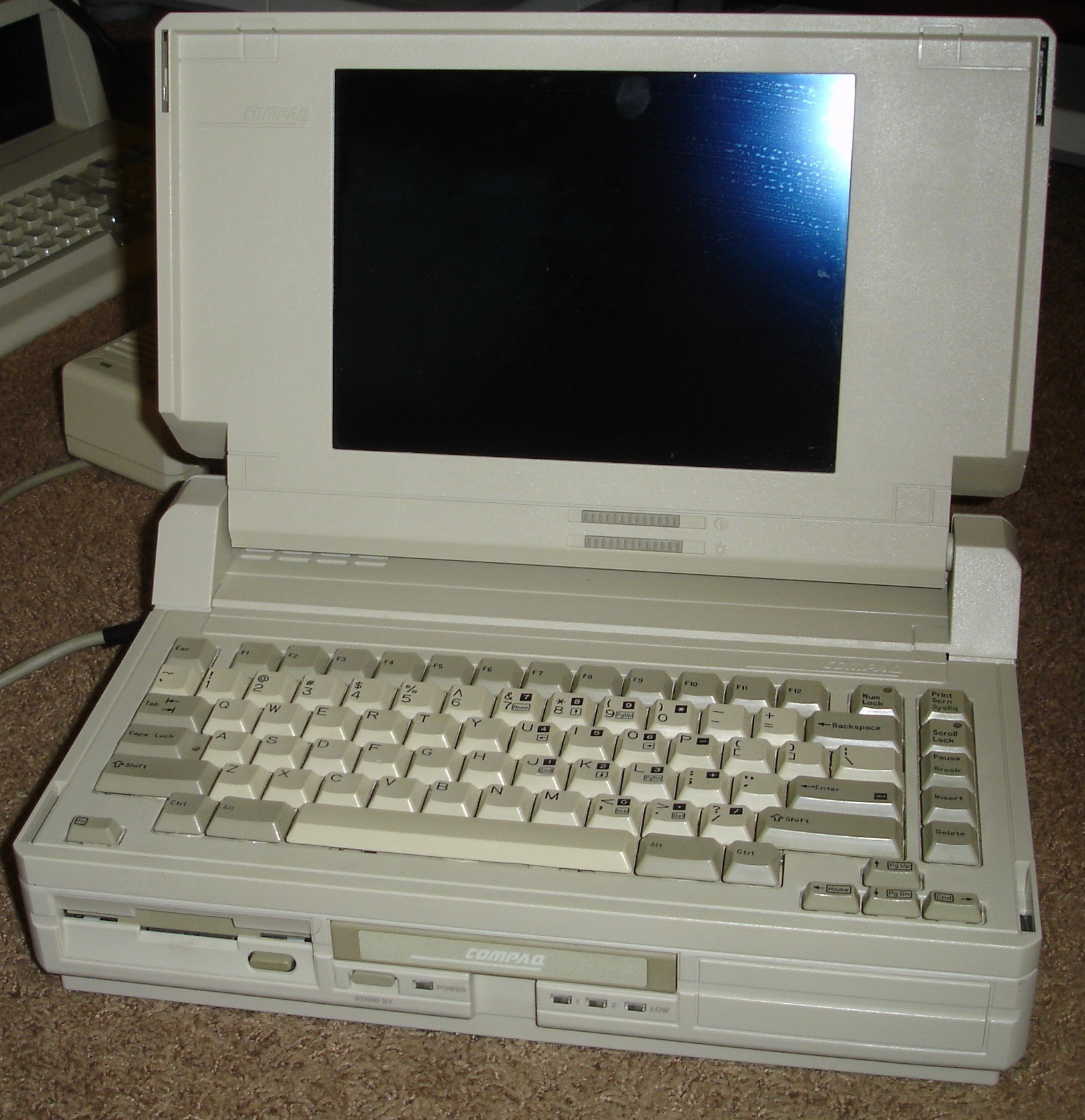
- Compaq SLT/286 laptop computer
- Manufacturer: Compaq
- Released: October 17, 1988; 37 years ago
- Introductory price: $5,399 (about $10,992 adjusted)
- CPU: 12-MHz 80C286 (SLT/286); 20-MHz 386SX (SLT 386s/20)
- Successor: LTE

The SLT is a family of laptops released by Compaq Computer Corporation. The SLT was the first laptop ever released by Compaq, then primarily known as a maker of luggable and desktop computers. The SLT series was the successor to the Portable III and the predecessor to the more well-known LTE.

Two models were produced in the SLT series. The first model, named SLT/286, released on October 17, 1988, is considered to be one of the most notable units in laptop history due to its battery life and superior performance compared to competing models. It is also notable for being Compaq’s first laptop computer. The SLT/286 had a 12 MHz Harris or Intel 80C286 processor (both brands were used throughout the SLT/286’s production) and a grayscale (up to 8 shades) backlit VGA LCD screen, the first laptop with this feature. The price started at $5,399 for the base-model. The SLT/286 came standard with 640 KB of RAM, expandable to 12.6 MB, and either a 20 MB or 40 MB hard disk. The 80287 and an internal 2400bps modem were also available options. Some models of the SLT/286 were also provisioned to have a second floppy drive instead of a hard drive.

The second model, the SLT 386s/20, was released in 1990, and came standard with a 20 MHz 386SX CPU, 4 KB of cache, 2 MB of RAM expandable to 14 MB, and a 60 or 120 MB hard disk. The 387SX and the 2400bps internal modem were offered as options.

Both units had an external expansion dock which could utilize a multitude of add-on boards, external storage devices, and enhanced human interface devices, or an external CD-ROM drive as options.

== Docking station ==
The SLT line was marketed as a desktop replacement and had a matching docking station, which allowed two standard ISA boards to be used with the SLT.

The docking station retailed for $999.

== Models ==
Model	Release date	Processor	Clock Speed	Spec / Notes
SLT/286	October 17, 1988	286	12 MHz	-
SLT 386s/20	June 18, 1990	386SX	20 MHz	

== Battery life ==
Compaq's main marketing message for the SLT range was its battery life, up to 3-hours minimum. Compaq mentioned this feature in almost all of the SLT literature. Moreover, Compaq released an external battery charger to enable the business user to charge up multiple batteries.

== Clones ==
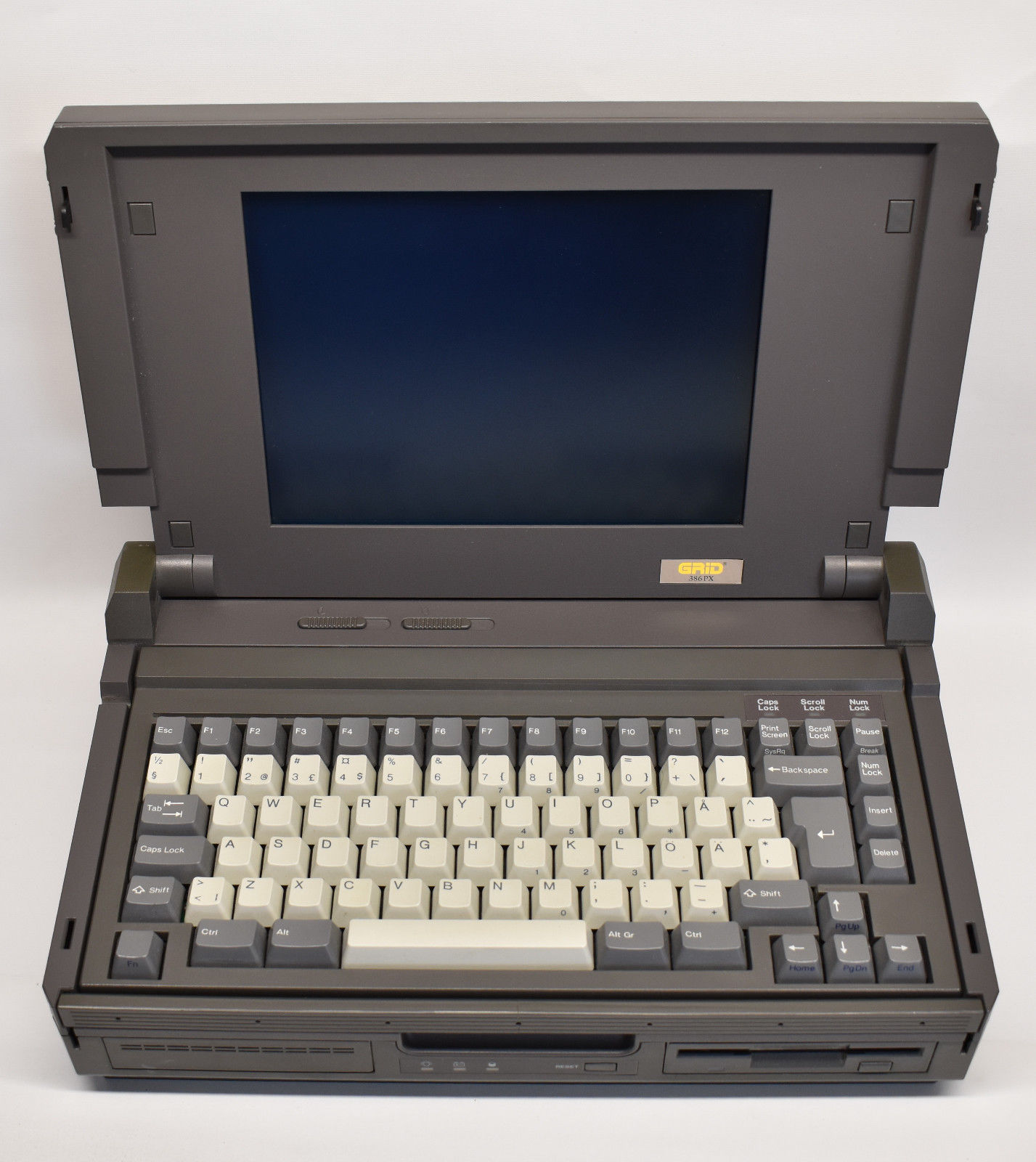
Grid 386PX

Victor Technologies offered a clone of the SLT/386 model, model Grid 386PX (BV30E01A). Whilst the Grid 386PX looks slightly different, it was unclear whether the Grid 386PX was a true clone or an alternative OEM product.

Acer also offered a clone, known as the AnyWare 1100LX.
