= Zenith MinisPort =

Line of PC-compatible subnotebooks

minisPORT
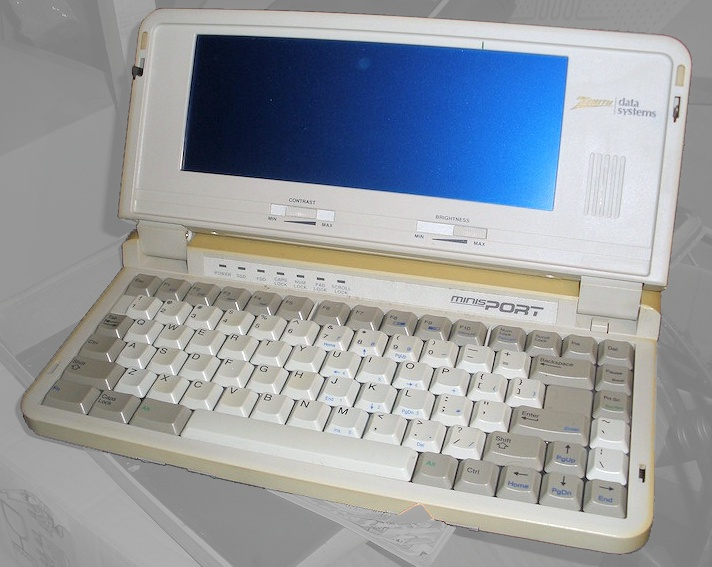
- Developer: Zenith Data Systems
- Manufacturer: Zenith Data Systems
- Type: Laptop
- Released: 1989
- Operating system: MS-DOS 3.3 Plus
- CPU: Intel 80C88 @ 4.77 or 8 MHz
- Memory: 1 or 2 MB
- Storage: 20 MB hard disk
- Removable storage: floppy disk
- Display: LCD, 640 × 200
- Graphics: CGA

The Zenith minisPORT is a subnotebook based on an 80C88 CMOS CPU running at two software selectable speeds: 4.77 MHz or 8 MHz. It was released in 1989 by Zenith Data Systems (ZDS).

It had 1 (model ZL-1) or 2 MB (model ZL-2) of RAM, ran MS-DOS 3.3 Plus from ROM, had a 640×200 LCD and CGA and composite monochrome outputs. The MinisPort was one of the first actual subnotebooks, apart from a contemporary NEC model.

== Features ==
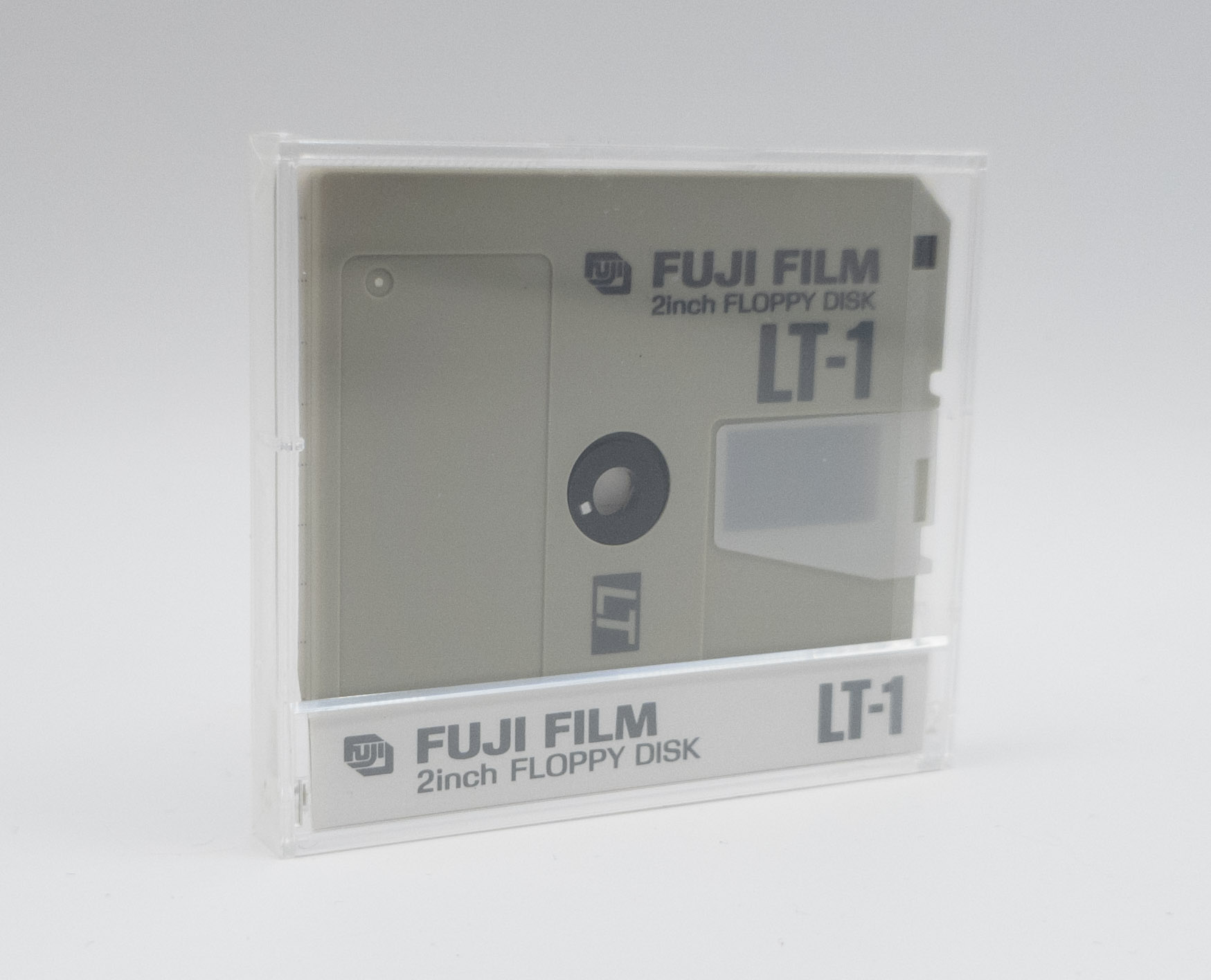
LT-1 2" Floppy Disk

- Internal 2-inch "LT" floppy disk drive (793 KB formatted, double-sided, double-density, 80 tracks, 245 tpi, media: Fujifilm LT-1). The floppy disks typically cost $80 for ten of them. The disks were not compatible with two-inch "VF" video floppy diskettes.
- An external standard 3.5-inch 720 KB double-density floppy drive was available as well.
- Built-in FastLynx transfer software that could install itself on any other DOS computer over a serial cable without the need for any pre-existing software on the remote system. It relied on the user typing in a DOS mode command on the other computer, which transferred control of that computer's command line to the Zenith over the serial line. The software then copied itself across, and the user could then move files. This to some extent compensated for the fact that no other computer ever used the 2-inch floppy disks, thus rendering floppy transfers impractical.
- The ability to set aside some of its upper memory (typically the 384 KB area between 640 KB and 1 MB) as a battery-backed RAM disk; this was relatively unique in DOS-based laptops (others, like the Toshiba T1000 also supported RAM disks). The RAM disk appeared as C: in DOS and enabled the computer to run with no spinning disks, extending battery life and increasing reliability. Contents were preserved with the power off, though using a minuscule amount of current from the main battery.
- Later versions included an integral 20 MB hard disk. This was enough to run WordPerfect and associated programs, including spell-checkers and diagnostic programs.

== Dimensions ==
The MinisPort is 12.5-inch wide × 9.8-inch deep × 1.29-inch tall (318 mm × 249 mm × 33 mm), (lid closed), 7.75-inch (197 mm) tall (lid open). It weighs 5.9 lb (2.7 kg) with the battery.
