= Hosiden =

Japanese electronics company

Hosiden Corporation
- Native name: ホシデン株式会社
- Romanized name: Hoshiden Kabushiki Kaisha
- Company type: Public
- Traded as: TYO: 6804
- Founded: 14 September 1950; Japan
- Headquarters: Yao, Osaka
- Website: www.hosiden.com

Hosiden Corporation (ホシデン株式会社, Hoshiden Kabushiki Kaisha) is a Japanese electronics company. It manufactures electronic components and devices and has a strong presence in the telecommunication and automotive industries prior to the consumer markets. It is headquartered in Yao, Osaka, and has over 19 factories and more than 12,000 workers.

Its products include connectors, memory card connectors, LCDs (Square and Rounded) and micro switches.

For its application in S-Video, the 4-pin Hosiden, Oshiden, or Ushiden connector is often wrongly called mini-DIN connector. Hosiden Besson Limited was established in 1957, trading as A P Besson and Partner Limited in the UK, manufacturing earpieces for the National Health Service. It was sold to Crystalate Electronics in 1971 to form the Besson division, and as part of a manufacturing group it assimilated injection mouldings and designed and manufactured printed circuit boards. On 2 March 1990 Hosiden Corporation, acquired the company. Its capabilities now include acoustic, electronic, research and development, fire products, transmission products, manufacture and assembly, injection molding, and distribution.
