= Notebook computer =

Obsolete size class of laptops

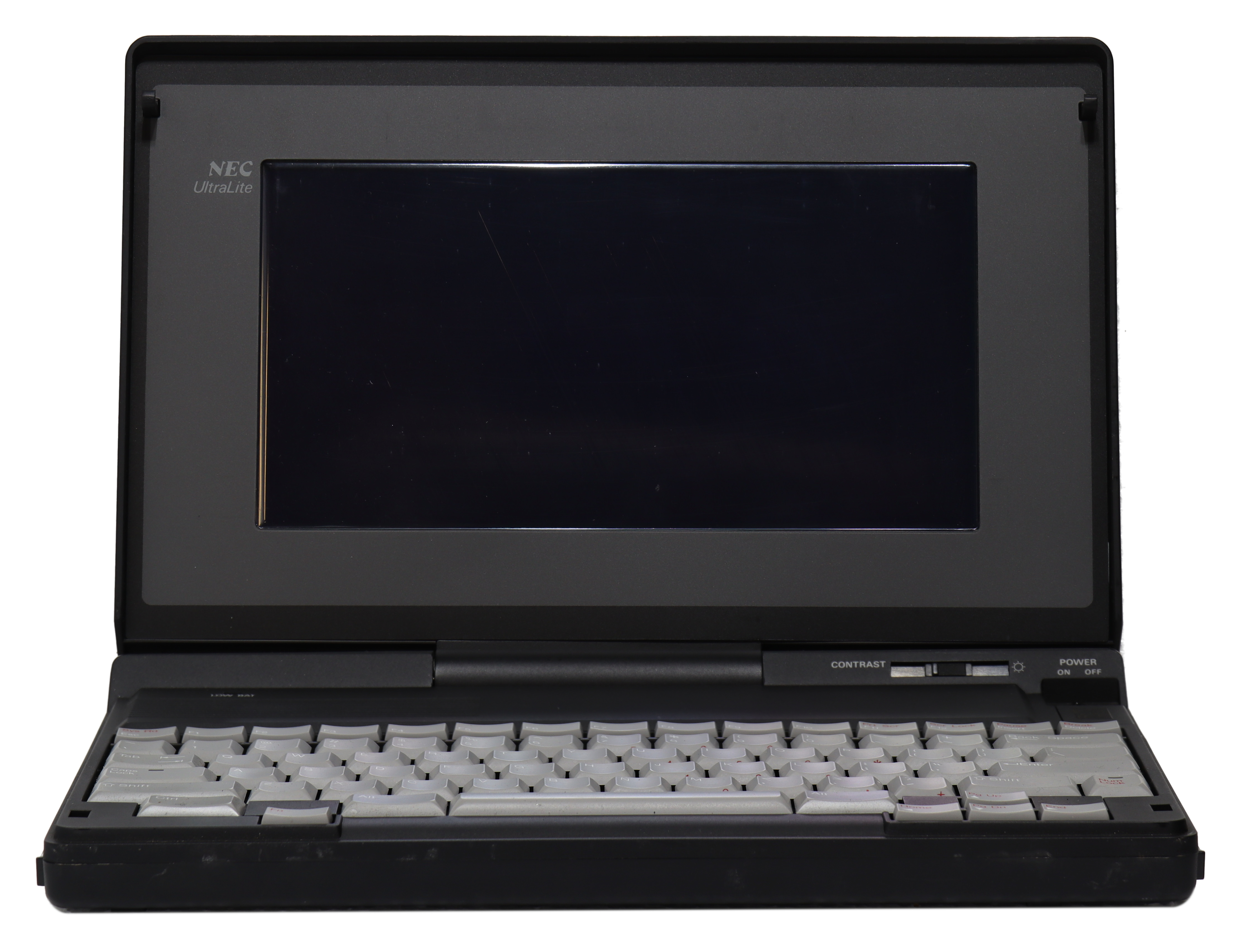
The NEC UltraLite defined the modern notebook on its release in 1988.

A notebook computer or notebook is, historically, a laptop whose length and width approximate that of letter paper (8.5 by 11 inches or 220 by 280 millimetres). (Note: In countries observing ISO 216, A4-sized paper (210 by 297 millimetres or 8.27 by 11.7 inches) was used as the benchmark for the dimensions of notebooks.) This physical footprint was once considered important to business buyers, as it meant that they could store their notebook computers inside most standard briefcases. Notebooks and laptops occupied distinct market segments into the mid-1990s but converged in the early 2000s. The terms laptop and notebook are now used interchangeably, irrespective of physical dimensions, with laptop being the more common term in English-speaking territories.

The term notebook was coined to describe slab-like portable computers that had a letter-paper footprint, such as Epson's HX-20 and Tandy's TRS-80 Model 100 of the early 1980s. The popularity of this form factor waned in the middle of the decade, as larger, clamshell-style laptops offered far more capability. In 1988, NEC's UltraLite defined a new category of notebook: it achieved IBM PC compatibility, making it technically as versatile as the largest laptops, while occupying a letter-paper footprint in a clamshell case. A handful of computer manufacturers followed suit with their own notebooks, including Compaq, whose successful LTE achieved full feature parity with laptops and spurred many other manufacturers to produce their own notebooks. The early 1990s saw the notebook industry peak; it also saw the development of the subnotebook, a size class even smaller than notebooks but still larger than palmtop PCs. Customer preference for larger screens led to notebooks breaking the letter-paper size barrier in the late 1990s and subsequently becoming synonymous with laptops.

== Etymology ==
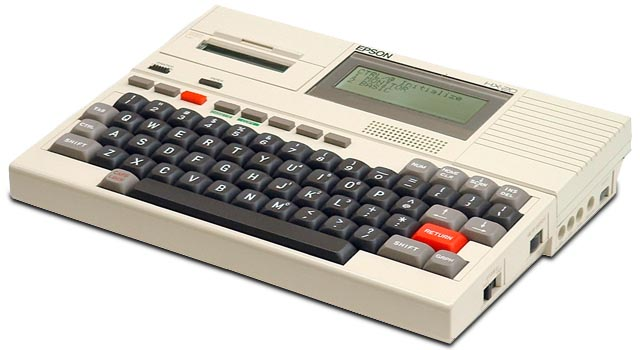
The Epson HX-20 from 1982 was the first portable computer to be called a "notebook".

The terms laptop and notebook both trace their origins to the early 1980s, coined to describe portable computers in a size class smaller than the contemporary mainstream units (so-called "luggables") but larger than pocket computers. The etymologist William Safire traced the origin of laptop to some time before 1984; the earliest attestation of laptop found by the Oxford English Dictionary dates to 1983. The word is modeled after the term desktop, as in desktop computer. Notebook, meanwhile, emerged earlier in 1982 to describe Epson's HX-20 portable, whose dimensions roughly correspond to a letter-sized pad of paper.

== History ==
In the mid-1980s, notebooks and laptops came to represent differing form factors of portable computer in the technology press, with notebooks possessing simplified hardware and a slab-like appearance with exposed keyboard (typified by the HX-20 and the TRS-80 Model 100); and laptops possessing more advanced hardware and a clamshell case to protect the keyboard. These early notebooks were all but discontinued by 1987, with laptops gaining favor due to their increased versatility.

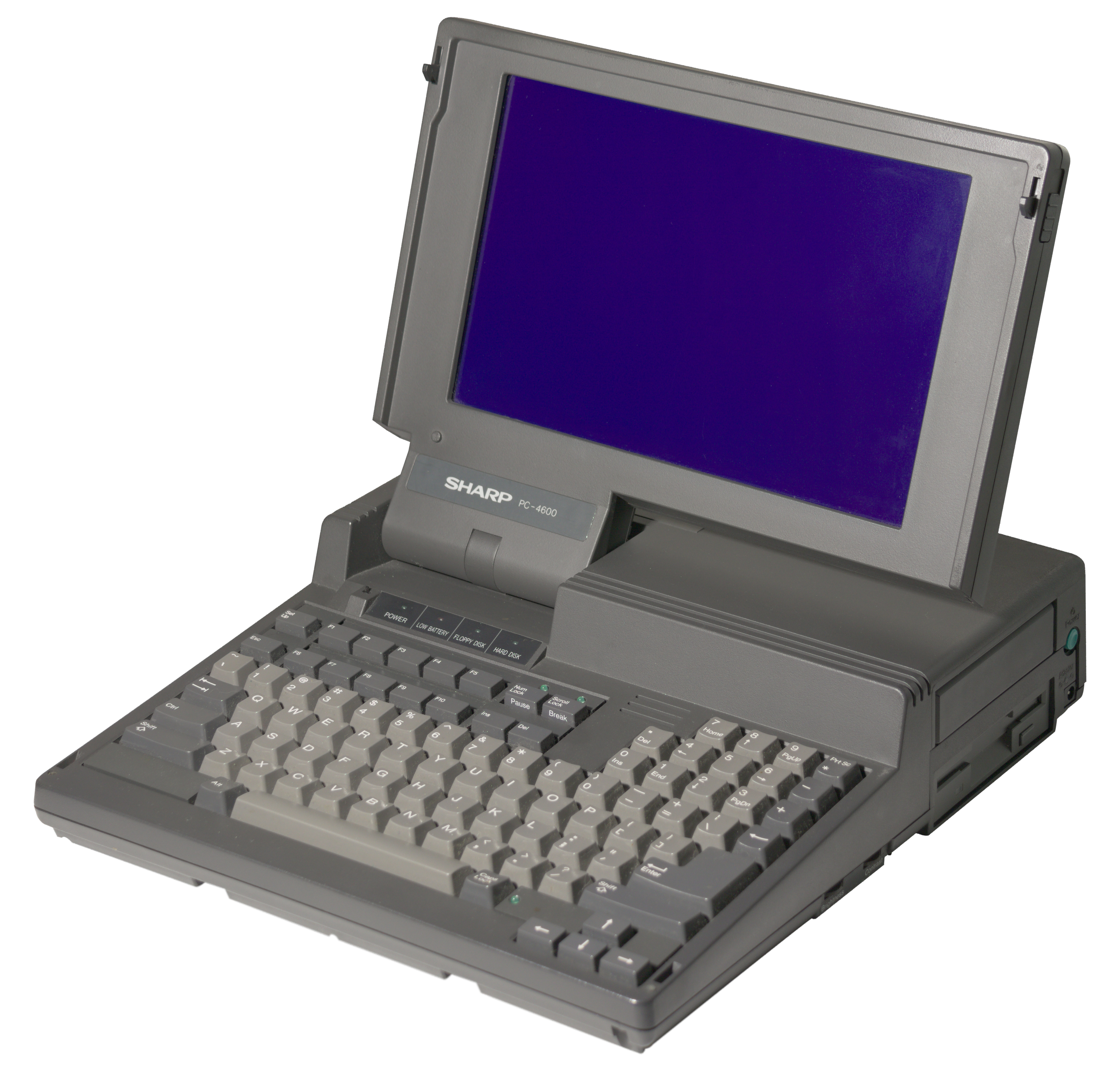
The Sharp PC-4641, a laptop released in the same month as the UltraLite. Larger laptops continued to be marketed alongside notebooks for several years.

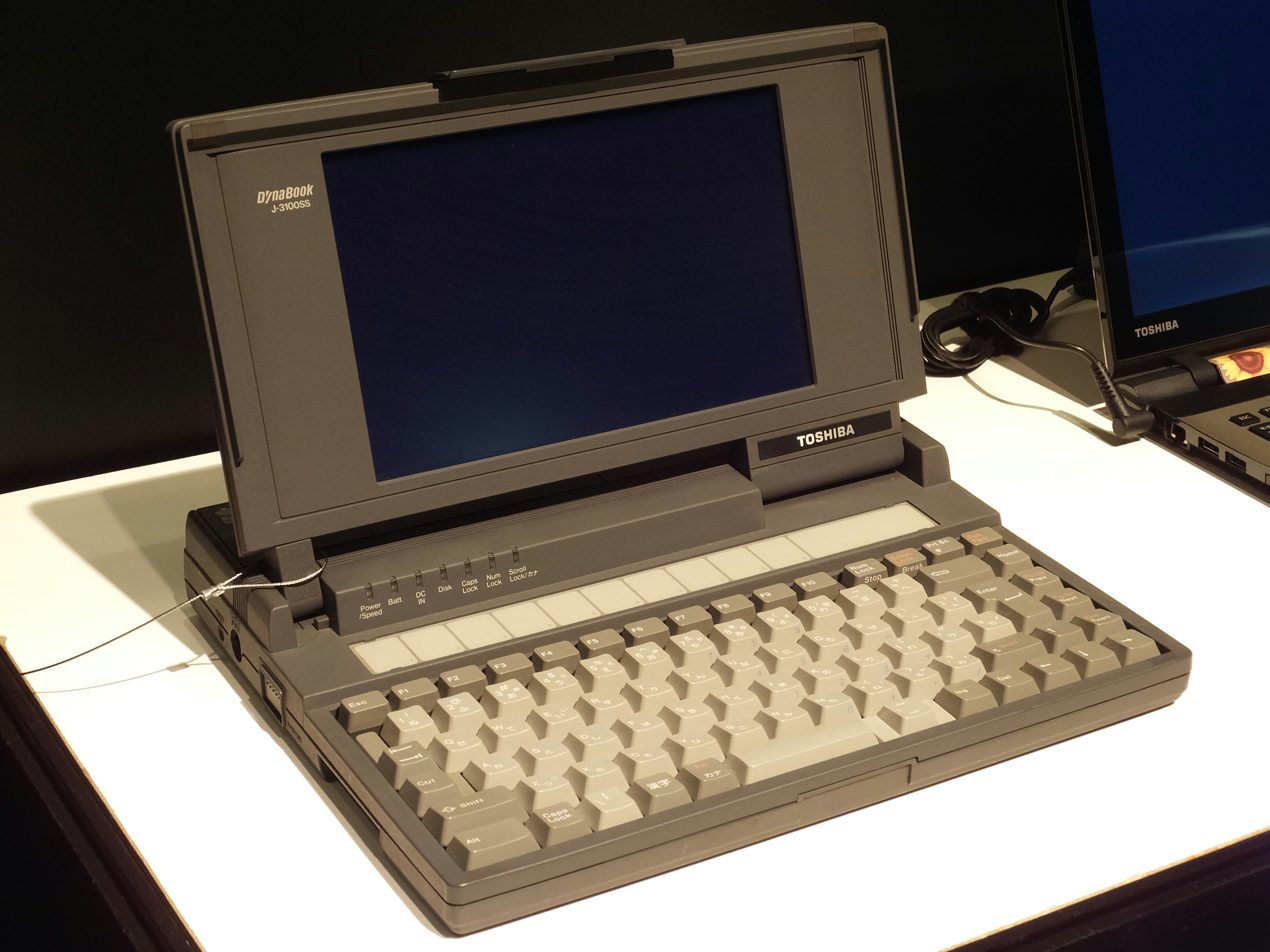
Toshiba's DynaBook J-3100SS was cited by the company as the "first notebook PC"

By this point, however, laptops were gaining hardware features faster than the industry could miniaturize their parts, leading to very heavy laptops—some upwards of 20 pounds (9.1 kg). In October 1988, NEC released the UltraLite, the first notebook-sized clamshell laptop compatible with the IBM PC. The term notebook was promptly revived by journalists to describe the new class of laptop that the UltraLite had invented. Competitors soon came out with competing models, and while initial entries like the UltraLite made concessions in terms of data storage compatibility, (Note: For example, the UltraLite as shipped supported only proprietary solid-state RAM and ROM cartridges to exchange data, as opposed to the standard (for the time) floppy disk.) Compaq's LTE line of notebooks in 1989 was the first to have full feature parity with the heaviest laptops of the time and jumpstarted the industry for these new notebooks, with scores of other manufacturers announcing their own notebooks. (Note: The LTE was prefigured by Toshiba's "book-sized" DynaBook J-3100 in July 1989, which was a smash hit in Japan and similarly featured a 3.5-inch floppy drive. However, its footprint was larger than the LTE by over an inch in both dimensions; it also lacked the option for a hard drive.)

In direct response to Compaq, both Apple and IBM, top players in the computer industry, made their hotly anticipated entries in the notebook market in 1991 and 1992, respectively, with the PowerBook and the PS/2 Note (a predecessor to the ThinkPad). Under the aegis of the Industrial Technology Research Institute, dozens of Taiwanese computer manufacturers formed a consortium to mass-produce notebook computers starting in 1991. These Taiwanese notebook computers soon flooded the West, bringing the cost of notebooks down on the low end of the market.

Laptops and notebooks continued to occupy discrete market segments into the mid-1990s, with unit sales tracked separately by research firms such as Dataquest. Notebooks were seen as having a footprint exactly that of or smaller than letter paper (8.5 by 11 inches or 22 by 28 centimetres), while laptops were larger. This distinction was considered important to business buyers, whose briefcases often had a compartment exactly that size. An additional distinction was weight, with 8 pounds (3.6 kg) a loose upper limit for what journalists would accept as a "notebook" in the press. Aside from size and weight considerations, notebooks were also seen as more sleek and stylish than the bulkier laptops. Compared to notebooks, however, laptops saw quicker improvements in processing speed and memory; featured better upgradability; and were less easy to steal. In addition, the earliest notebooks had monochrome-only LCDs, whereas laptops had color LCDs since 1989 (with NEC's ProSpeed CSX). Others still preferred laptops for their keyboards, which featured fuller-sized layouts and often superior build quality; journalists evaluated the keyboard poorly in most early notebooks.

The year 1991 saw the first notebooks with color displays, as well as the emergence of subnotebooks, which occupy a size class in between notebooks and palmtop PCs. By late 1992, the higher-end notebooks had run into the same miniaturization issues that laptops had encountered in the 1980s, with some notebooks weighing as much as 14 pounds (6.4 kg).

Starting in 1997, screen sizes in notebook computers began increasing rapidly, fueled by consumer preference toward larger displays over compactness. The emergence of LCD panels larger than 12.1 inches diagonally in early 1997 led to the breaking of the 8.5-by-11-inch size barrier. By 1999, portable manufacturers had started integrating 13-, 14-, and even 15-inch LCD panels on their notebooks. Ergonomic considerations, as well the integration of pointing devices such as touchpads, also necessitated increasing the size of laptops to accommodate a larger palm rest area. These developments led to the distinction between and laptops and notebooks becoming blurred by the early 2000s. In English-speaking territories, laptop is now the more common term to describe any clamshell portable computer—notebook-sized or otherwise—likely because of the lack of ambiguity with actual paper notebooks.

== See also ==
- Dynabook
- Netbook
- Smartbook
- Ultrabook
- Mobile workstation
- Pizza-box form factor
