= List of laptop brands and manufacturers =

This is a list of laptop brands and manufacturers.

== Manufacturers ==
=== Major brands ===
Company	Country/Region	Current product lines	Defunct product lines	Market share (Q3 2023)
Lenovo	China	Chromebook, Essential, Googlebook, IdeaPad, Legion, LOQ, Pro, Slim, ThinkBook, ThinkPad, ThinkPad Yoga, Yoga	3000, Flex, Miix, Skylight, ThinkPad Helix, ThinkPad Twist	23.4%
HP	United States	Chromebook, EliteBook, Googlebook, OmniBook, ProBook, ZBook, Omen	110, Envy, Essential, Mini, Pavilion, Spectre, Voodoo Envy	19.8%
Dell	United States	Alienware, Chromebook, Dell, Dell Pro, Dell Pro Precision, XPS, XPS Googlebook	320SLi, Adamo, Dell Pro Max, G Series, Inspiron, Latitude, Precision, Studio, Vostro	15.0%
Apple	United States	MacBook Air, MacBook Pro, MacBook Neo	iBook, PowerBook, MacBook, Macintosh Portable	10.6%
Asus	Taiwan	Chromebook, Expertbook, Googlebook, ProArt, ROG, ROG Strix, ROG Zephyrus, TUF, VivoBook, ZenBook	EeeBook, Transformer	7.1%
Acer	Taiwan	Aspire, Chromebook, Enduro, Extensa, Googlebook, Nitro, Packard Bell, Predator, Spin, Swift, TravelMate	AcerNote, Aspire One, Aspire Timeline, ConceptD, Ferrari, Gemstone, Switch	6.4%

=== Other brands ===
Company	Country/Region	Current model lines	Former model lines
Acemagic	China	X1	—N/a
Alienware	United States	X15, X16, M15, Area-51m R2, 13, 14, 15, 17, 18, Aurora	
Chuwi	China	Herobook, Corebook	
Clevo	Taiwan	NP70 series, P870DM3-G, X170KM-G, X7200	
Corsair	United States	Origin PC	Voyager
CTL	United States	PX111E, PX141GXT	
Digital Storm	United States	Avon 15, Banshee 17.3"	
Dynabook	Japan	Chromebook, E series, Portégé, Satellite Pro, Tecra	—N/a
Eurocom	Canada	Sky, Tornado, Nightsky, Commander, Monster	
Falcon Northwest	United States	DRX, TLX	
Framework Computer	United States	Framework Laptop	
Fujitsu	Japan	Celsius, Chromebook, Lifebook	—N/a
Getac	Taiwan	X600, B360, S410, F110, UX10, V110	
Gigabyte Technology	Taiwan	Aorus, Aero, Gaming	
Haier	China	Chromebook, Thunderobot	
Hasee	China	Z-Series	
Honor	China	MagicBook	
Huawei	China	MateBook, Qingyun	—N/a
Hyundai Technology	South Korea	Flip, Book, FlipNote, ThinNote	
Infinix Mobile	Hong Kong	InBook, GTBook	
Itel Mobile	Hong Kong	Able, Epic	
Jio	India	Jiobook	
LG	South Korea	Chromebook, Gram	Xnote
Medion	Germany	Akoya, Erazer	
MSI	Taiwan	Summit, Prestige, Venture, Modern, Titan, Raider, Vector, Stealth, Crosshair, Sword, Katana	Megabook, GT, GS, GF, GE, GP, GL, Wind
Microsoft	United States	Surface Laptop, Surface Laptop Go, Surface Laptop SE, Surface Laptop Studio	—N/a
Mouse Computer	Japan	LuvBook	
Multilaser	Brazil	Ultra	
Origin PC	United States	EVO15-S, EVO17-S, EVO17-X, NT-15i, NT-15, NT-17	
Panasonic	Japan	Let's Note, Toughbook	CF-V21P, Toughpad
Polytron	Indonesia	Luxia	
Positivo	Brazil		
Purism	United States	Librem	
Razer	Singapore–United States	Blade, Book	
Realme	China	Realmebook	
Samsung Electronics	South Korea	Galaxy Book, Galaxy Book Pro, Notebook, Series 7 Slate	Ativ, Sens
SHIFT	Germany	SHIFTbook	
System76	United States	Galago Pro, Oryx Pro, Pangolin, Lemur Pro, Gazelle, Darter Pro, Kudu Pro, Serval WS, Bonobo WS, Adder WS	
Tecno	Hong Kong	MegaBook	
Tsinghua Tongfang	China	X-Series	
Tuxedo Computers	Germany	Aura, Gemini, InfinityBook S, InfinityBook Pro, Polaris, Pulse, Sirius, Stellaris	
Twinhead	Taiwan	Durabook	
UMAX	Taiwan	VisionBook	
Vaio	Japan	Z series, F series, S series, SX series	
Velocity Micro	United States	Signature 17, Raptor S77, Raptor MX70	
VIT	Venezuela	P1420, P3310-01, P3310-02	
Walton	Bangladesh	Prelude, Passion, Tamarind, Karonda, Waxjambu	
Wortmann	Germany	Terra	
Xiaomi	China	Mi NoteBook, RedmiBook	

=== No longer manufacturing laptops ===
Company	Country/Region	Product lines	Notes
AOpen	Taiwan	Chromebook	
BenQ	Taiwan	Joybook	
Canon	Japan–United States	Innova Book, NoteJet, Power Notebook	Canon exited the personal computer business in 1997.
CTX	Taiwan	EzNote	
CyberPowerPC	United States	Tracer V Series, Tracer IV, Tracer III	
Epson	Japan	ActionNote, Endeavor, HX-20, PX-4, PX-8 Geneva	Epson exited the personal computer business in the United States in 1996 and in Japan in the 2010s.
Google	United States	Chromebook Pixel, Pixelbook, Pixelbook Go	
Grundig	Turkey		
HCL	India	Me	
Hisense	Taiwan	Chromebook	
Hitachi	Japan	VisionBook	
HTC	Taiwan	Shift	
IBM	United States	PC Convertible, PCradio, PS/2 Model CL57 SX, PS/2 Model L40 SX, PS/note, PS/2 Note, PS/55 Note, Palm Top PC 110, ThinkPad, WorkPad Z50	IBM sold its personal computer and Intel-based server businesses to Lenovo in 2005.
Lava International	India	Twinpad, Helium Series	
NEC	Japan	Chromebook, LaVie, MultiSpeed, ProSpeed, UltraLite, Versa	
Nokia	Finland	PureBook	
Olivetti	Italy	Echos, M10, Philos, Olibook, Quaderno	
Onkyo	Japan	Sotec	
Philips	Netherlands	X200	
Sharp	Japan	Actius, IS01, PC-4500, PC-5000, WideNote	Sharp fully acquired personal computer and laptop business of Toshiba in June 2020. This subsidiary now runs as Dynabook Inc.
Sony	Japan	Vaio	Sony sold its PC business division to Japan Industrial Partners (JIP) in 2014; owns 5 percent of Vaio Corporation.
Texas Instruments	United States	Extensa, TravelMate	Texas Instruments sold its laptop business to Acer in 1997.
Toshiba	Japan	Chromebook, Dynabook, Libretto, Portégé, Satellite, Satellite Pro, Qosmio, T series, Tecra	Toshiba fully exited the personal computer and laptop business in June 2020, transferring the remaining 19.9 percent shares to Sharp Corporation, which now runs the business as Dynabook Inc.
Vestel	Turkey		
Walmart	United States	Gateway 2-in-1 Convertible, Gateway Ultra Slim, Motile	
Wipro	India		

=== Defunct brands ===
Company	Country/Region	Product lines	Notes
Acorn Computers	United Kingdom	Deskbook, Desknote, Solonote	
Amstrad	United Kingdom	NC100	
AST Research	United States	Advantage! Explorer, Ascentia, PowerExec, Premium Exec	Acquired by Samsung Electronics
Atari Corporation	United States	ST Book	
Athena Computer & Electronic Systems	United States	Athena 1	
Bondwell	United States–Hong Kong	Bondwell-2	
Cambridge Computer	United Kingdom	Z88	
Commodore	United States	C286-LT, C386SX-LT	Acquired by Tulip Computers
Compaq	United States	Armada, Concerto, Contura, Evo, LTE, Presario, ProSignia, SLT, tc1000	Acquired by Hewlett-Packard
Data General	United States	Data General/One, Walkabout	
Digital Equipment Corporation	United States	DECpc, HiNote	Acquired by Compaq
Doel	Bangladesh		
Dulmont	Australia	Magnum	
eMachines	United States		Acquired by Gateway, Technicially owned by Acer
Everex	United States	CloudBook, gBook	
Founder Technology	China	E-Series, R-Series	
Gateway, Inc.	United States	ColorBook, HandBook, Liberty, Solo	Acquired by Acer
Gavilan	United States	SC	
Grid Systems	United States	Compass, GridCase, GridPad	Currently, Grid Systems still exists under Grid Defence Systems in the United Kingdom
Intelligence Technology Corporation	United States		
Fujitsu Siemens	Japan–Germany		Fujitsu bought out Siemens's share of the company
Gericom	Austria		Acquired by Quanmax AG
Husky Computers	United Kingdom	Husky	
Itautec	Brazil		Acquired by Oki Electric Industry, PC and laptop division dissolved
KDS Computers	South Korea–United States		Subsidiary of Korea Data Systems
Librex Computer Systems	Japan		Subsidiary of Nippon Steel
Maxdata	Germany		
MicroOffice Systems Technology	United States	RoadRunner	
One Laptop per Child	United States	XO	
OQO	United States		
Outbound Systems	United States	Outbound, Wallaby	
Packard Bell	United States	PB286LP, Statesman	Acquired by Acer
PC Club	United States		
Pravetz	Bulgaria	64M	
Psion	United Kingdom	MC, Series 7, netBook	
Tandy	United States	1100 FD, 1400 series, TRS-80 Model 100	
TriGem	South Korea	Averatec	
Vigor Gaming	United States	Atlantis, Augustus, Artorius, Aegis	
VoodooPC	Canada	Envy	Acquired by Hewlett-Packard
Xolo	India		
Zenith Data Systems	United States	MastersPort, MinisPort, SupersPort, Z-Star, ZP-150	Acquired by Packard Bell

== Original design manufacturers (ODMs) ==
The vast majority of laptops on the market are manufactured by a small handful of Taiwan-based original design manufacturers (ODM), although their production bases are located mostly in mainland China. Quanta Computer pioneered the contract manufacturing of laptops in 1988. By 1990, Taiwanese companies manufactured 11% of the world's laptops. That percentage grew to 32% in 1996, 50% in 2000, 80% in 2007 and 94% in 2011. The Taiwanese ODMs have since lost some market share to Chinese ODMs, but still manufactured 82.3% of the world's laptops in Q2 of 2019, according to IDC.

Major relationships include:

- Foxconn sells to Asus, Dell, HP, and Apple
- Pegatron (in 2010, Asus spun off Pegatron) sells to Asus, Apple, Dell, Acer, and Microsoft
- Quanta sells to (among others) HP, Lenovo, Apple, Acer, Dell, NEC, and Fujitsu
- Compal sells to (among others) Acer, Dell, Lenovo, Framework and HP
- Wistron (former manufacturing & design division of Acer) sells to Acer, Dell, Lenovo, and HP
- Inventec sells to HP, Dell, and Lenovo
- Flextronics (former Arima Computer Corporation notebook division) sells to HP
- Clevo and Tongfang sell to different laptop manufacturers like Digital Storm, Eluktronics, Eurocom, Metabox, Sager, Schenker, System76, XMG, Medion, Maingear, Origin, Gigabyte [lower end Gigabyte laptops are Clevo], etc.

=== ODM laptop units sold and market shares ===
Year	Country/Region	2024	2020	2019	2018	2017	2016	2015	2014	2013	2012	2011	2010	2009		2006	
ODM	Country/Region	Units sold (millions)	Units sold (millions)	Units sold (millions)	Units sold (millions)	Units sold (millions)	Units sold (millions)	Units sold (millions)	Units sold (millions)	Units sold (millions)	Units sold (millions)	Units sold (millions)	Units sold (millions)	Units sold (millions)	Proportion of market	Units sold (millions)	Proportion of market
Compal	Taiwan	32.3	45.4	42.6			34.5	39.3	43.0	46.0	37.8	55.7	48.2	37.9	26%	15	21%
Quanta	Taiwan	45.9	57.6	34.8	37.6		40.6	31.6	48.5	43.1	53.8	54.0	52.1	35.9	25%	24	33%
Wistron	Taiwan	20.2	20.4	17.4			18.9	18.8	21.1	24.0	31.5	31.5	27.5	26.2	18%	11	15%
Inventec	Taiwan	20.1	19.5	18.4			9.9	8.5	18.6	20.9	16.8	17.0	16.2	21	15%	7	10%
Pegatron, until 2007 Asus	Taiwan	8.0	11.4	10.3			8.7	9.5	9.8	14.0	18.5	17.5	15.5	10.9	8%	5	7%
Foxconn	Taiwan						2.7	4.2				18.4	10.0	7.2	5%		
Flextronics	United States											5.0	4.3	7.2	5%		
Elitegroup	Taiwan													3.6	2%		
Others												15.0	10.0			11	15%
Total			?	?	163.7	164.7	?	158	141	148	194	214	203	125	100%	72.6	100%

There is a discrepancy between the 2009 numbers due to the various sources cited; i.e. the units sold by all ODMs add up to 144.3 million laptops, which is much more than the given total of 125 million laptops. The market share percentages currently refer to those 144.3 million total. Sources may indicate hard drive deliveries to the ODM instead of actual laptop sales, though the two numbers may be closely correlated.

== See also ==
- List of computer hardware manufacturers
- List of computer system manufacturers
- Market share of personal computer vendors
