= Eurocom (disambiguation) =

Eurocom may refer to:

- Eurocom, a UK-based video game developer
- Eurocom Corporation, a Canadian laptop manufacturing company.
- Eurocom S.A., a marketing company that merged into Euro RSCG, later Havas Worldwide

== See also ==
- Eurecom, a French university
