= Acer Aspire 8920 =

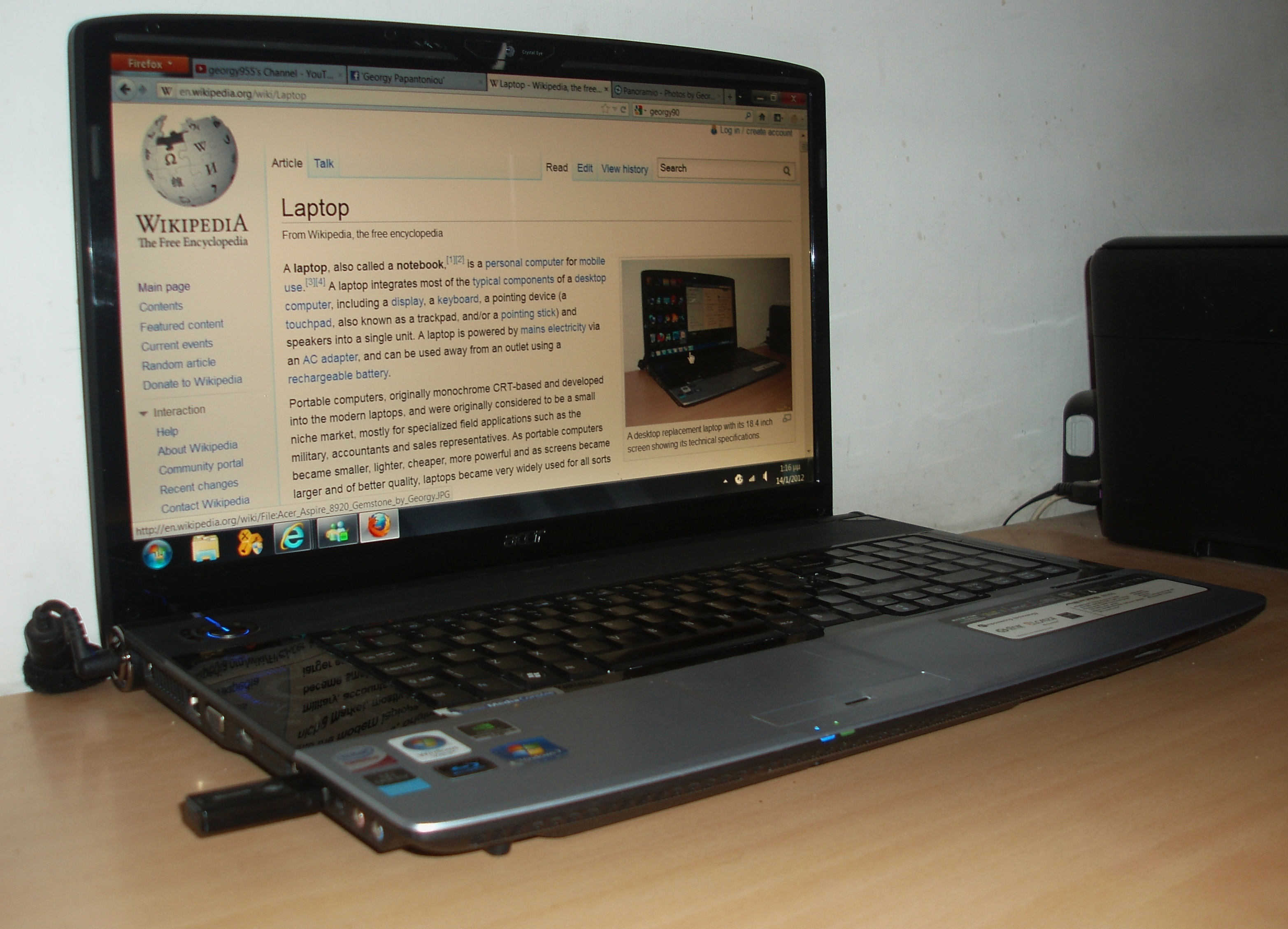
- Manufacturer: Acer
- Type: Desktop replacement computer/laptop
- Media: 320/500/640 GB HDD
- Operating system: Windows XP, Windows Vista, Windows 7
- CPU: 2.4/2.5 GHz Intel Core 2 Duo
- Memory: 4 GB DDR2
- Display: 18.4 in (47 cm), 1920*1080 LCD TFT, HD Glossy LED LCD
- Input: Keyboard, mouse
- Camera: 1.3 MP webcam
- Connectivity: 4 USB 2.0 ports 5-in-1 card reader VGA video-out port 3.5mm audio jacks Realtek 10/100 Mbit/s Ethernet; Qualcomm Atheros 802.11b/g WLAN; Bluetooth; HDMI
- Power: 71W 4800 mAh lithium Ion 8-cell battery pack: 1.5-hour battery life without TV-tuner Acer QuicCharge technology: 80% charge in 1 hour, 2-hour rapid charge system-off, 3-hour charge-in-use
- Dimensions: W×D×H 9.8 in (25 cm) × 6.7 in (17 cm) × 1 in (2.5 cm)
- Weight: 4.2kg/9.2lbs

The Acer Aspire 8920 is a series of notebooks released in 2008 Q1 by Acer Inc., and a part of the Gemstone series. It is the first 18.4" screen notebook created by Acer, and is part of the Desktop replacement computer category. The laptop has a 16:9 display with a native resolution of 1920 x 1080. It was often described as the flagship of Acer Aspire models until it was surpassed by other 8900s series desktop replacement computer laptops, such as the Acer Aspire 8930G, 8940 and 8942.

== Dimensions ==
Width (left to right)	17.4"
Depth (front to back)	11.8"
Height (max) (thickness)	1.7"

Note: Weight varies by configuration.
