= Clevo x7200 =

Laptop by Clevo

Clevo X7200
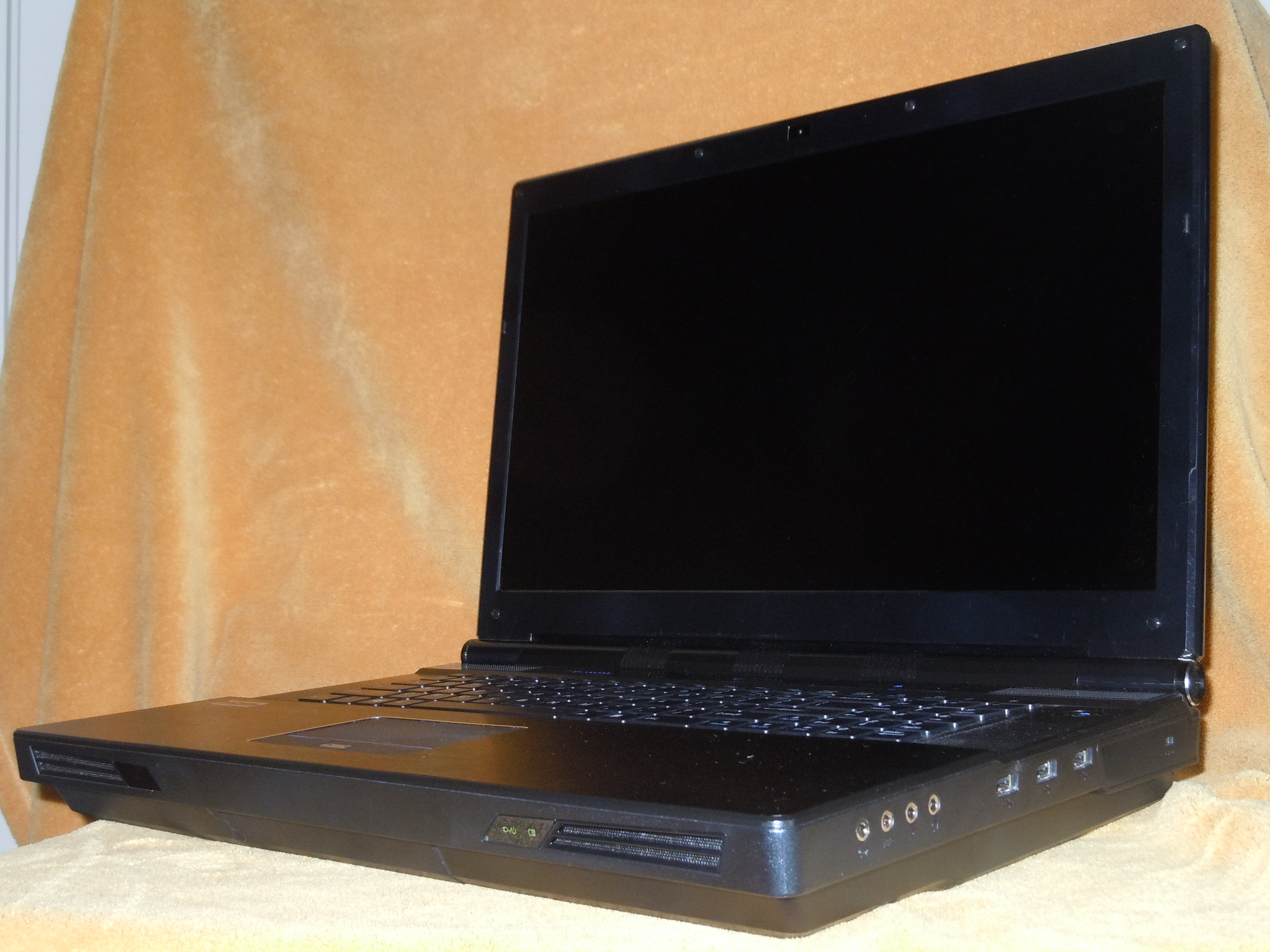
- Clevo X7200
- Developer: Clevo
- Type: Desktop replacement laptop
- Released: September 2010
- CPU: Desktop Intel Core i7 for LGA 1366
- Graphics: ATI Radeon, Nvidia GeForce
- Website: Clevo x7200

The Clevo X7200 is a 17.3" laptop computer manufactured by Clevo, released in September 2010. Unlike other laptops of the time, the X7200 is designed to run a desktop Intel Core i7 processor for LGA 1366 socket. The X7200 may be configured to use dual link video cards using either Nvidia GeForce GTX (Fermi architecture) in SLI or AMD (ATI) Mobility Radeon 6970 in Crossfire configuration. The X7200 has capacity for three hard drives, allowing various RAID configurations, including RAID 0, RAID 1, RAID 5, and also RAID 10 if the optical drive is replaced by a fourth HDD.

The X7200 was superseded by Clevo models of updated but broadly similar desktop-computer-like characteristics, such as the P570WM3.

== Performance and price ==
When configured with an Intel i7 980X/990X processor and Nvidia SLI or AMD Crossfire GPUs, the performance of the X7200 is comparable to a desktop machine, faster than laptop computers with more restricted processors and graphics cards. This makes the machine suitable for processor- and graphics-intensive use, such as for playing games requiring high performance, LAN parties, software development, and video editing. The price, according to a review when the computer was launched, is commensurate with performance, starting at US$2,680, and rising to as high as $5,781.

== Unusual features ==
- Supports Intel Core i7 desktop CPUs, including the X58 HEDT i7-980X and i7-990X Extreme Edition, more powerful than mobile CPUs usually used by laptops.
- Four internal drive bays (including one that may hold an optical drive), more than other laptop computers.
- Supports dual video cards. The Clevo x7200 can be configured with two top-end Nvidia SLI or ATI CrossFire adapters, giving graphics performance better than other laptops.

== Branding ==
Clevo laptops are not sold directly to customers, but are own-branded by resellers. Some reseller model names are:

- Eurocom Panther 2.0
- Maingear Titan 17
- Origin PC EON17
- Sager NP7280
- Falcon Northwest DRX.X
- cybertronPC
- Multicom Kunshan X7200

== Reviews ==
At the time of its release in September 2010 the X7200 was favourably reviewed by AnandTech, and described as "King of the Desktop Replacement". It was also described as "an absolute tank", due to its weight of 5.5 kg in a basic configuration, compared to around 3 kg for other 17" "laptop" computers, and heavy power consumption of around 300W.

== Known issues ==
Soon after its release, it was reported certain X7200/NP7280 configurations under heavy use would cause the power supply unit (PSU) to cut out, switching the power to the laptop's battery. In order to prevent the problem, Clevo developed a power connecting bridge so two PSUs could be used in tandem to provide the necessary power to the system, thus preventing the PSU from a fault.
