= Canon NoteJet =

Notebook computer with built-in printer

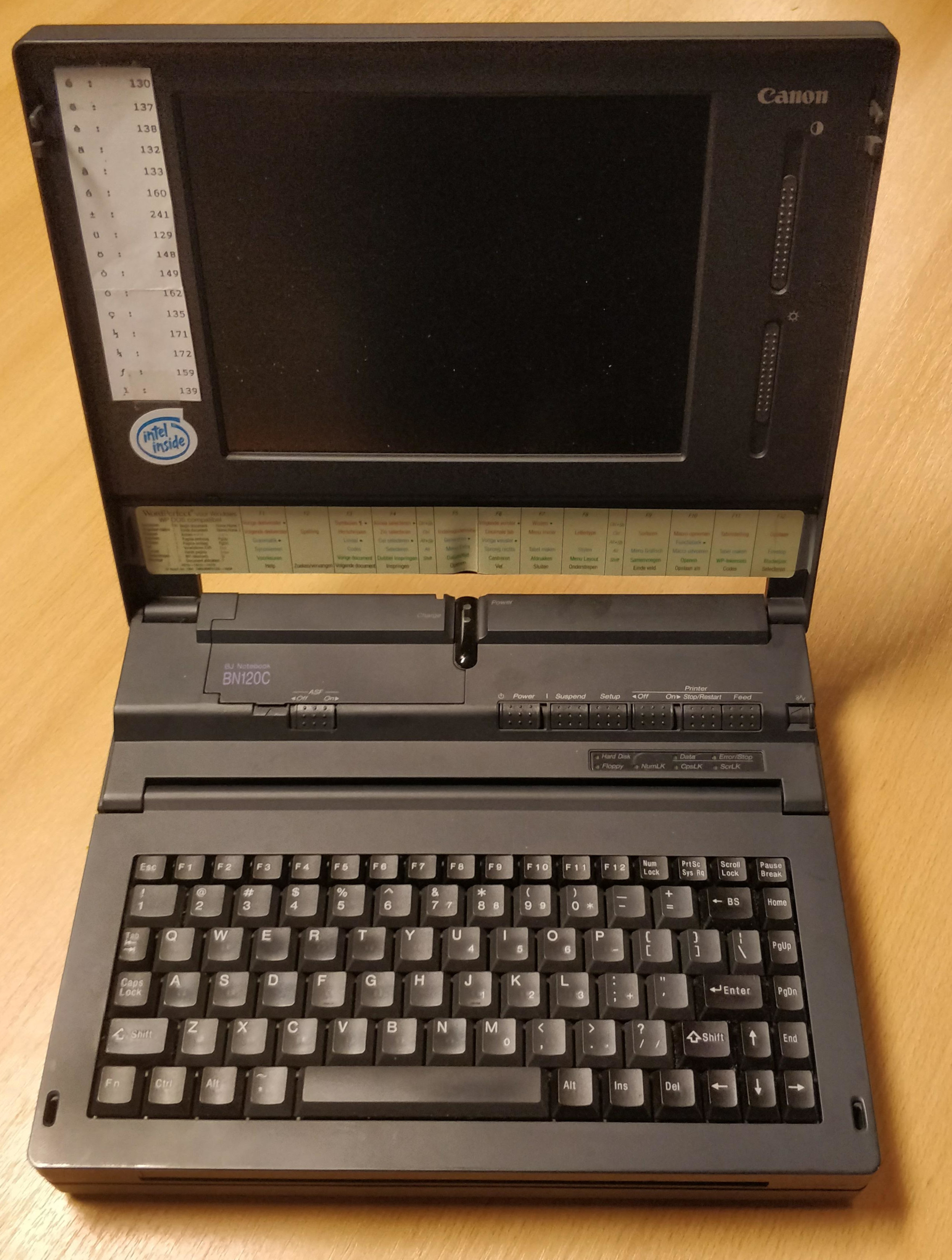
- Canon BN120C
- Manufacturer: IBM Japan, Canon Computer Systems
- Introduced: 1993
- Discontinued: 1995
- Type: Laptop, printer

The Canon NoteJet is a series of notebook computers which include a printer and scanner that was manufactured from 1993 to 1995 by a joint venture between the Canon subsidiary Canon Computer Systems Inc. and IBM subsidiary IBM Japan. The Canon branded series was sold worldwide except in Japan, where the similar IBM ThinkPad 555BJ and 550BJ was sold. The European model did not use the NoteJet branding and was branded as the Canon BN120C, BN22 or BN200.

Reviews during the general availability of the series were mixed. Historical analyses viewed it either extremely positive or extremely negative.

== History ==
Canon, one of the largest printer manufacturers globally, released their first inkjet printer in 1985. They joined the x86 PC market in October 1992 as Canon Computer Systems Inc. and launched the Innova PC line in 1993. Canon combined these products in the NoteJet series. Bubble Jet and BJ are trademarks owned by Canon, which have been used by IBM for their printer-laptops.

According to Canon, the printer in the NoteJet is 70% smaller than any printer they developed before.

== Models ==
External videos
- The Canon BN22 (BJ Notebook) printing laptop

The Canon branded models were released globally, except in Japan where the IBM branded ThinkPads were released. The NoteJet branding was not used in Europe.

Model	CPU	Display	RAM	Disk	MSRP	Ref
NoteJet 486 or BN22	Cyrix 486SLC, 25 MHz (manufactured by TI)			85MB, 130MB or 180MB	$2499	
NoteJet II 486C	486SLC2, 50 MHz	10.3 inch DSTN	4MiB	130MB or 260MB		
NoteJet IIIcx or BN 200	Pentium, 90 MHz	800x600	16MiB	810MB		
BN120C	Intel 486, 100 MHz		16MiB	810MB		
ThinkPad 550BJ	IBM 486SLC, 25 MHz	9.5 inch STN				
ThinkPad 555BJ	486SLC2, 50 MHz	10.3 inch DSTN color LCD	12MiB			

The Canon NoteJet 486 received the award of merit by BYTE magazine in January 1994.

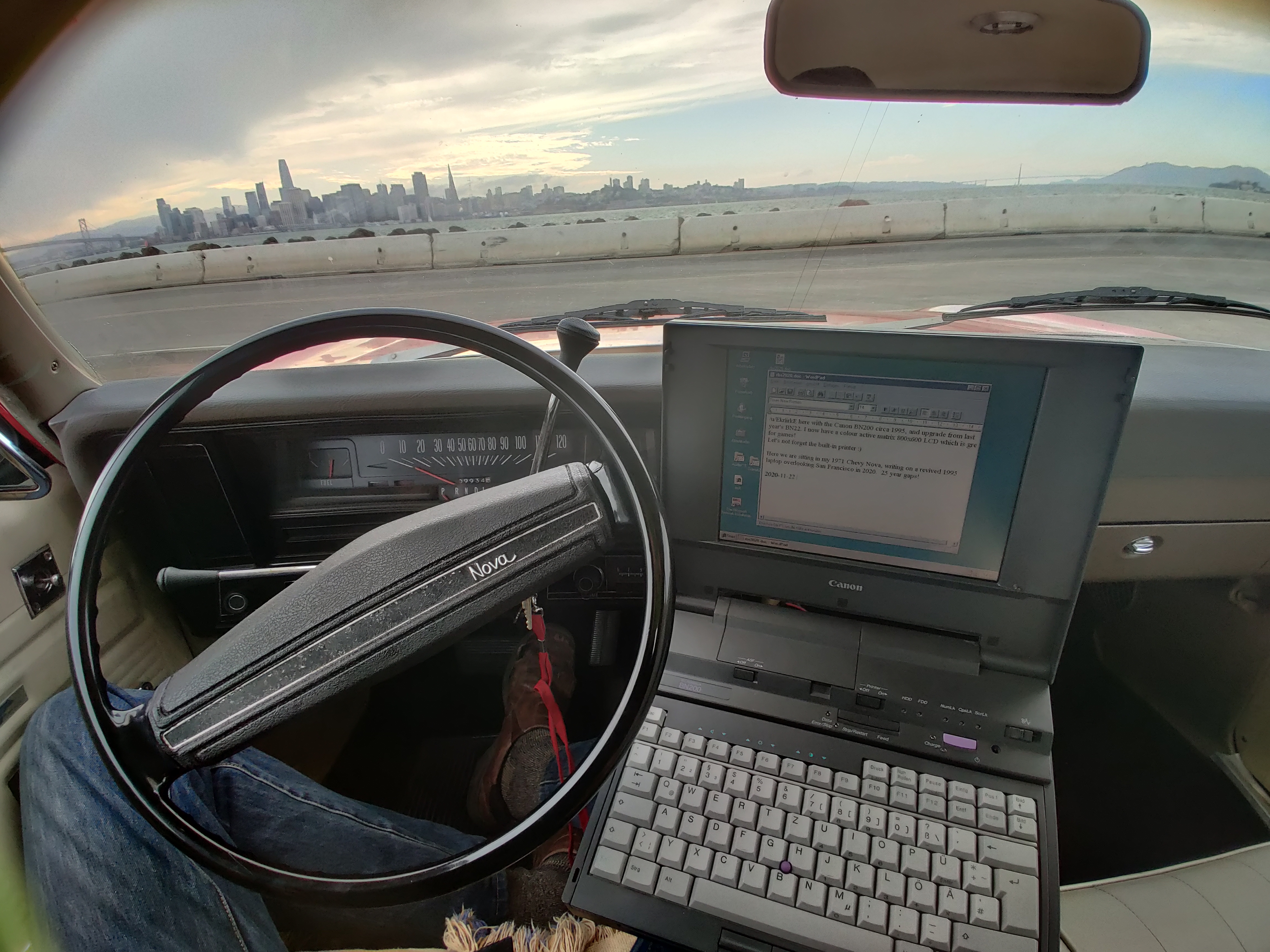
Canon BN200 in a Chevrolet Nova with a view on San Francisco as a mobile office setup.

The 550BJ was launched in Japan on 19 February 1993. It was developed within the new self-contained IBM Personal Computer Company which was set up in 1992, separate from the IBM corporate hierarchy. The computer components were developed by IBM Japan and printer components were developed by Canon, with both logos engraved on the machine. The BJ stands for Bubble Jet which is Canon's printer technology. Although ThinkPads are known for their usage of the TrackPoint pointing stick, this machine comes with a "Mini Mouse II-B" The machine gained popularity mainly amongst beginners and students.

== Reception ==
PCMag reviewed the NoteJet IIIcx in 1996. They noted the slowness of the scanning feature while appreciating the quality documentation from Canon. They concluded that the PC performance was average, but noted the high amount of extra peripherals available. They noted: "the point isn't really how well it works, but that it works at all". According to The Wall Street Journal, users have complained that the NoteJet series was too heavy and expensive.

PCMag listed it in a 2015 article as one of the 7 "Bizarre FrankenPCs That Are Better Off Dead". TechRadar listed it in a 2016 article as one of the 12 "ground-breaking laptops that dared to be different", and argued that was sad that the NoteJet was a one-of-a-kind. PC World listed the Canon NoteJet 486 in a 2006 as one of the greatest PCs of all time.

== Further developments ==
The NoteJet series was silently discontinued.

Canon left the U.S. PC market in January 1997 due to low sales.

== See also ==
- List of Canon products
- List of IBM products
- Multi-function printer
