= Canon Computer Systems =

American subsidiary (1992–2001)

Coordinates: 33°40′17″N 117°52′46″W

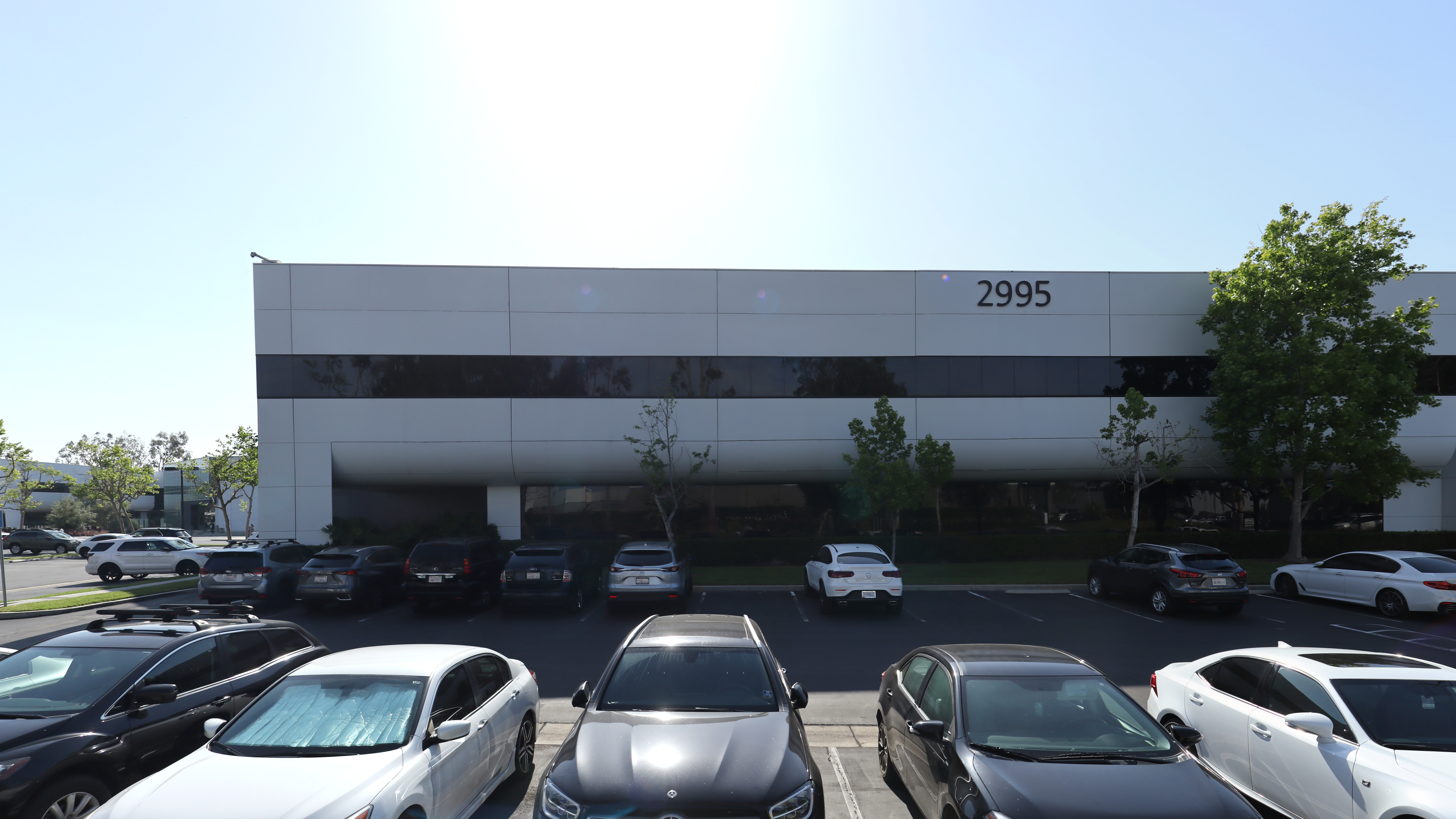
- Former headquarters in Costa Mesa, California
- Type: Subsidiary
- Industry: Computers
- Founded: April 1992; 34 years ago
- Defunct: January 2001; 25 years ago
- Fate: Restructured
- Successor: Canon Digital Home and Personal Systems
- Headquarters: Costa Mesa, California, United States
- Products: Innova series; NoteJet; Bubble Jet
- Parent: Canon Inc.
- Website: ccsi.canon.com at the Wayback Machine (archived October 31, 1996)

Canon Computer Systems, Inc. (CCSI), sometimes shortened to Canon Computer, was an American subsidiary of Canon Inc. formed in 1992 to develop and market the parent company's personal computers and workstations. The subsidiary also assumed the responsibility of marketing Canon's printers and photocopiers, which were formerly sold by other Canon divisions. It went defunct in January 2001.

== History ==
Canon entered the computer industry in the 1970s, starting with the AX-1 in October 1978. It sported the form factor of a desktop calculator and was fully programmable. This was followed up with the AS-100 in 1982, which was a more-traditional albeit heavier personal computer that ran a Intel 8088 and ran MS-DOS. Canon entered the home computer market in 1984 with the V-20 and V-10 in 1984 and 1985 respectively. In 1987, the company released the Canon Cat—the brainchild of Jef Raskin who pioneered Apple's original Macintosh. In 1989, the company took a large stake in NeXT, a computer hardware company founded by Steve Jobs in 1987 after he resigned as CEO of Apple in the mid-1980s.

In April 1992, Canon spun off their computer manufacturing into Canon Computer Systems, a new subsidiary that also assumed the responsibility of marketing their parent company's printers and photocopiers. The subsidiary initially comprised 100 employees in October 1992, 50 based in Costa Mesa, California. Yasuhiro Tsubota, who founded Epson America in 1978, was named president. Several other higher-ups came from Epson America; Tsubota left Epson for NeXT 1990, to serve as a consultant for Jobs. The subsidiary's first offerings were a line of desktop computers and notebook-sized laptops, branded as the Innova and Innova Book respectively. The company expected $125 million in revenue by October 1993. They allocated $10 million of their initial budget on advertising, hiring the newly formed Hajjar/Kaufman (a spinoff of Dentsu) as their advertising agency.

Most if not all of the notebooks in the Innova Book line were produced offshore by Taiwanese OEMs. Canon repeatedly turned to Chicony of Taipei, who lent their designs to Canon for their Innova Book 10 and Innova Book 200LS. The former, released in 1994, was a subnotebook four pounds in weight, while the latter, released in 1995, sported the largest screen of any laptop up to that point, at 11.3 inches diagonal. Other models, including the 150, 300, and 400 series Innova Books, were manufactured by Featron, another Taiwanese OEM/ODM. Canon Computer collaborated with IBM's Japanese subsidiary to produce the Canon NoteJet, a notebook computer with a built-in inkjet printer, introduced to market in 1993. In March 1994, Canon Computer took the reins of the NeXTstation after NeXT ceased manufacturing hardware in 1993. They later released the Object.Station, an x86-based workstation based on the NeXTstation design.

Although Canon Computer set a goal of $1 billion sales by 1997 in 1994, they were considered late newcomers to the market of personal computers. Innovas and Innova Books continued to be sold until January 1997, when the company quietly left the desktop and notebook market, citing poor sales. The subsidiary shifted its focus to silicon-on-insulator manufacturing, spending ¥3 billion (US$25.8 million in 1997) to open up a clean room facility at Canon's plant in Hiratsuka, Tokyo. As part of this refocusing, Canon sold its existing shares of NeXT to Apple, who were in the process of acquiring that company after Jobs re-entered Apple in 1997. Canon Computer continued to sell printers, scanners and digital cameras until January 2001, when the subsidiary was restructured and renamed to Canon Digital Home and Personal Systems. Tsubota was replaced by Ryoichi Bamba.

== Computers ==
=== Desktops ===
Name	Processor	Clock speed (MHz)	Date
Innova 386SX/33	386SX	33	October 1992
Innova 486	486SX	25	October 1992
Innova 486SX/33	486SX	33	August 1993
Innova 486e	486SX	25	August 1993
Innova 486v	486DX2	33–66	August 1993
Innova Vision L33/210	486SX	33	March 1994
Innova Vision L50/340	486DX2	50	March 1994
Innova Media MT4900	486DX4	100	March 1995
Innova Media MT7010	Pentium	75	March 1995
Innova Media MT9110	Pentium	100	March 1995
Innova Media MT7000	Pentium	75	March 1995
Innova Media MT9100	Pentium	90	March 1995
Innova Media MT4610	486DX2	66	June 1995
Innova Media MT9010	Pentium	90	June 1995
Innova Media MT7030	Pentium	75	August 1995
Innova Media MT7040	Pentium	75	August 1995
Innova Media MT9120	Pentium	100	August 1995
Innova Media MT9130	Pentium	100	August 1995
Innova Media MT9300	Pentium	100	August 1995
Innova Media MT9310	Pentium	100	August 1995
Innova Media MT9320	Pentium	133	August 1995
Innova Media MT9600	Pentium	166	June 1996
Innova Pro 5100SD	Pentium	100	May 1996
Innova Pro 5400ST	Pentium	166	May 1996
Innova Media MT9210	Pentium	120	November 1996
Innova Media MT9340	Pentium	133	November 1996
Innova Media MT9350	Pentium	133	November 1996
Innova Media MT9620	Pentium	166	November 1996
Innova Media MT9630	Pentium	166	November 1996
Innova Media MT9800	Pentium	200	November 1996

=== Notebooks ===
==== Innova ====
Name	Processor	Clock speed (MHz)	Date
Innova 386NX	Am386SX	33	October 1992
Innova 486NX	486SX	25	October 1992
Innova Book 150C	486DX2	50	August 1994
Innova Book 150CT	486DX2	50	August 1994
Innova Book 1110 P75	Pentium	75	November 1995
Innova Book 1100 P75T	Pentium	75	November 1995
Innova Book 1100 P90	Pentium	90	November 1995
Innova Book 1100 P90T	Pentium	90	November 1995
Innova Book 1100 P120T	Pentium	120	November 1995
Innova Book 175C	Cx486	100	November 1995
Innova Book 200LS	486DX4	100	February 1995
Innova Book 300P	Pentium	75	November 1995
Innova Book 350CD	Cx5x86	100	November 1995
Innova Book 360CD	Am5x86	133	April 1996
Innova Book 475CDS	Pentium	100	May 1996
Innova Book 475CDT	Pentium	100	May 1996
Innova Book 620CDT	Pentium	133	June 1996
Innova Book 480CDS	Pentium	100	November 1996
Innova Book 480CDT	Pentium	100	November 1996
Innova Book 490CDS	Pentium	133	November 1996
Innova Book 490CDT	Pentium	133	November 1996

==== Subnotebooks ====
Name	Processor	Clock speed (MHz)	Date
Innova Book 10	486SL	33	May 1994
Innova Book 10C	486SL	33	May 1994

==== Other ====
Name	Processor	Clock speed (MHz)	Stock RAM	LCD technology	Date
PN-100	PowerPC 603e	100	16	Active-matrix color	July 1995
Power Notebook	PowerPC 603e	100	32	Active-matrix color	August 1995

=== Workstations ===
Name	Processor	Clock speed (MHz)	Hard drive interface	Date
Object.Station 31	Pentium	100	IDE	February 1995
Object.Station 41	Pentium	100	SCSI	February 1995
Object.Station 50	Pentium	100	SCSI	June 1995
Object.Station 52	Pentium	120	SCSI	June 1995
Power Workstation	PowerPC 604 (single or dual)	100, 120, or 133	SCSI	June 1995
