= Bondwell =

US and Hong Kong manufacturer

Bondwell Industrial Co. Inc.
- Industry: Electronics
- Founded: 1981; 45 years ago
- Defunct: 1993
- Fate: Acquired by Remotec Technology Ltd

Bondwell Industrial Co. Inc. was a US and Hong Kong manufacturer of personal computers during the 1980s (1981–1993).

== History ==
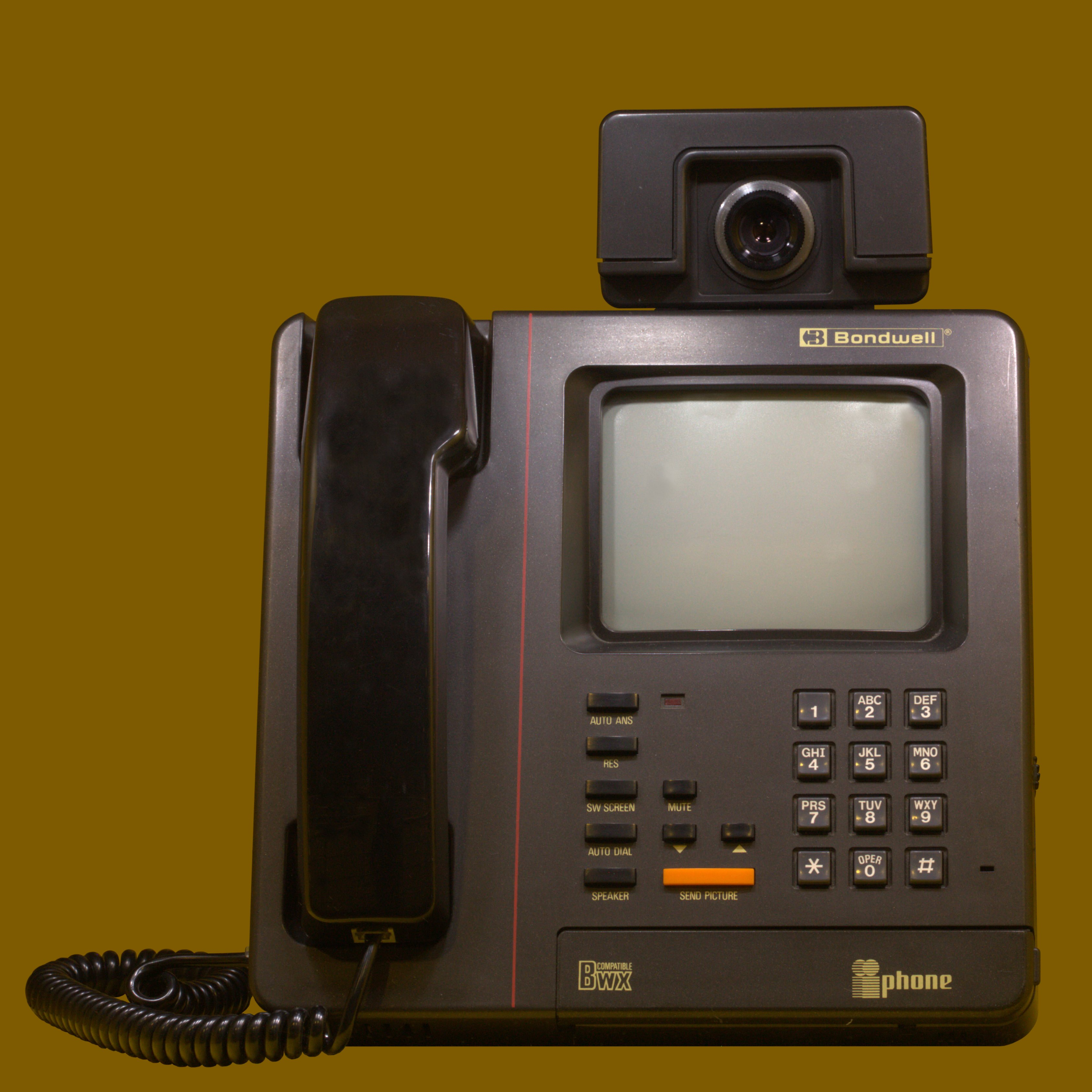
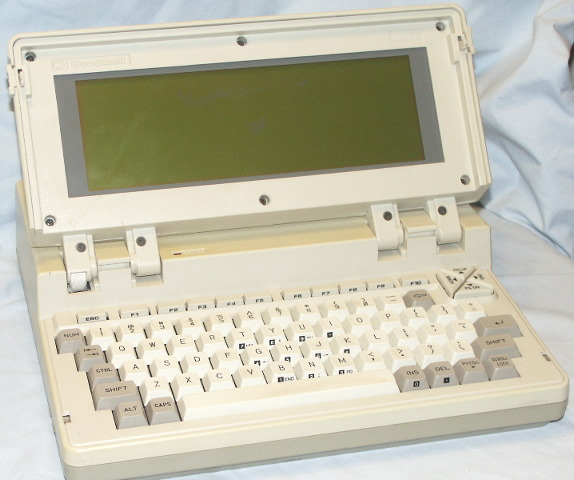
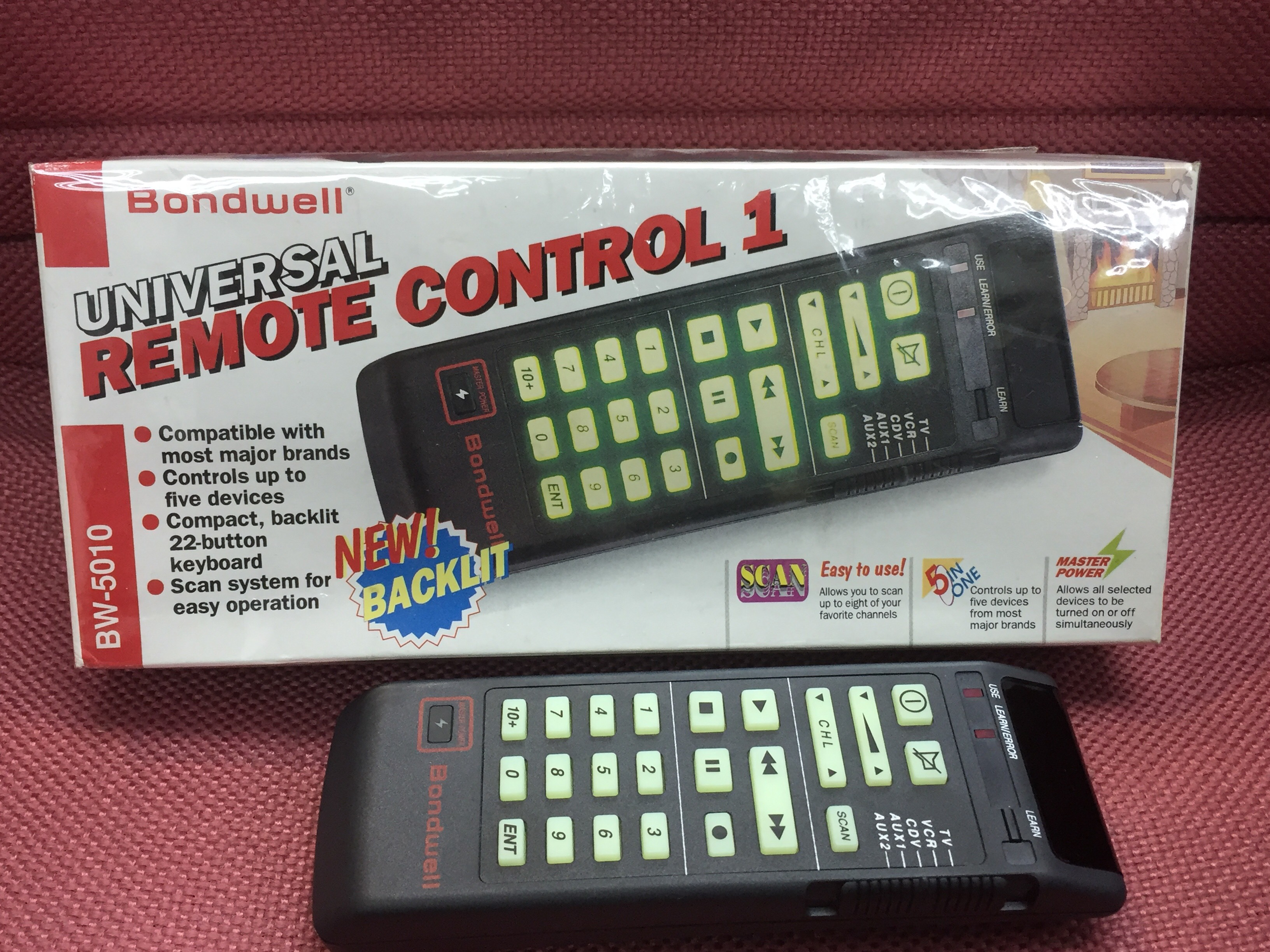
Various Bondwell products. Clockwise from upper left: The iiPhone, a videophone; Model 8, a laptop; the Bondwell-5010, a universal remote.

In the early 1980s, Bondwell sold a line of Z80, CP/M-80 based Osborne-like luggables such as the models Bondwell-12, Bondwell-14 and Bondwell-16. An exceptional feature in these was a built-in speech synthesizer. Their prices were exceptionally affordable for the time, although significant trade-offs were made in regard to durability, for instance the chassis was rather flimsy plastic, falling far short of the ruggedness usually expected of luggables. The fanless power supply unit, located under the motherboard, often caused trouble. The choice of peripheral I/O devices made the use of interrupts virtually impossible.

The Bondwell-12, introduced in 1984, was a "luggable" portable computer with a built-in 9 inch (23 cm) monochrome CRT display, equipped with 64 KB of internal memory, CP/M 2.2 and two single-sided, double density, 5.25 inch floppy disk drives (180 KB).

The Bondwell-14, introduced in 1984, had 128 KB of memory, CP/M 3.0 and two double-sided drives (360 KB).

The Bondwell-16, introduced in 1985, had CP/M 3.0, one double-sided drive and a hard disk drive with a capacity of a bit less than 10 MB.

The Bondwell-2, introduced in 1985, was a portable computer with 64 KB of memory, CP/M 2.2 and one single-sided, double density 3.5 inch floppy disk (360 KB). 256 and 512 KB memory extensions were available. It was one of the earliest portables, as well as one of the few battery-powered CP/M computers.

The more advanced Bondwell-18 model featured MS-DOS and the x86 architecture.

Bondwell Model 8, introduced in 1986, was a 5.5 kg, 284 x 78 x 310 mm, laptop portable computer. It featured an Intel 80C88 processor running at 4.77 MHz, a back-lit LCD with 80 x 25 characters or 640 x 200 graphic a built in battery and a 3.5" 720 KB floppy drive. It had a 76-key keyboard and the US version had a built-in 300 baud modem.

Bondwell also produced a range of 286-based portable computers such as the B310 Plus. Later models were 386 based machines.

Circa 1988, Bondwell also got involved in creating one of the first universal remote controllers BW-5010. The BW-5010 could control up to 5 devices and featured a backlight.

Bondwell was later transformed into Remotec Technology Ltd in 1993.
