= NEC UltraLite =

Line of notebook-sized laptops

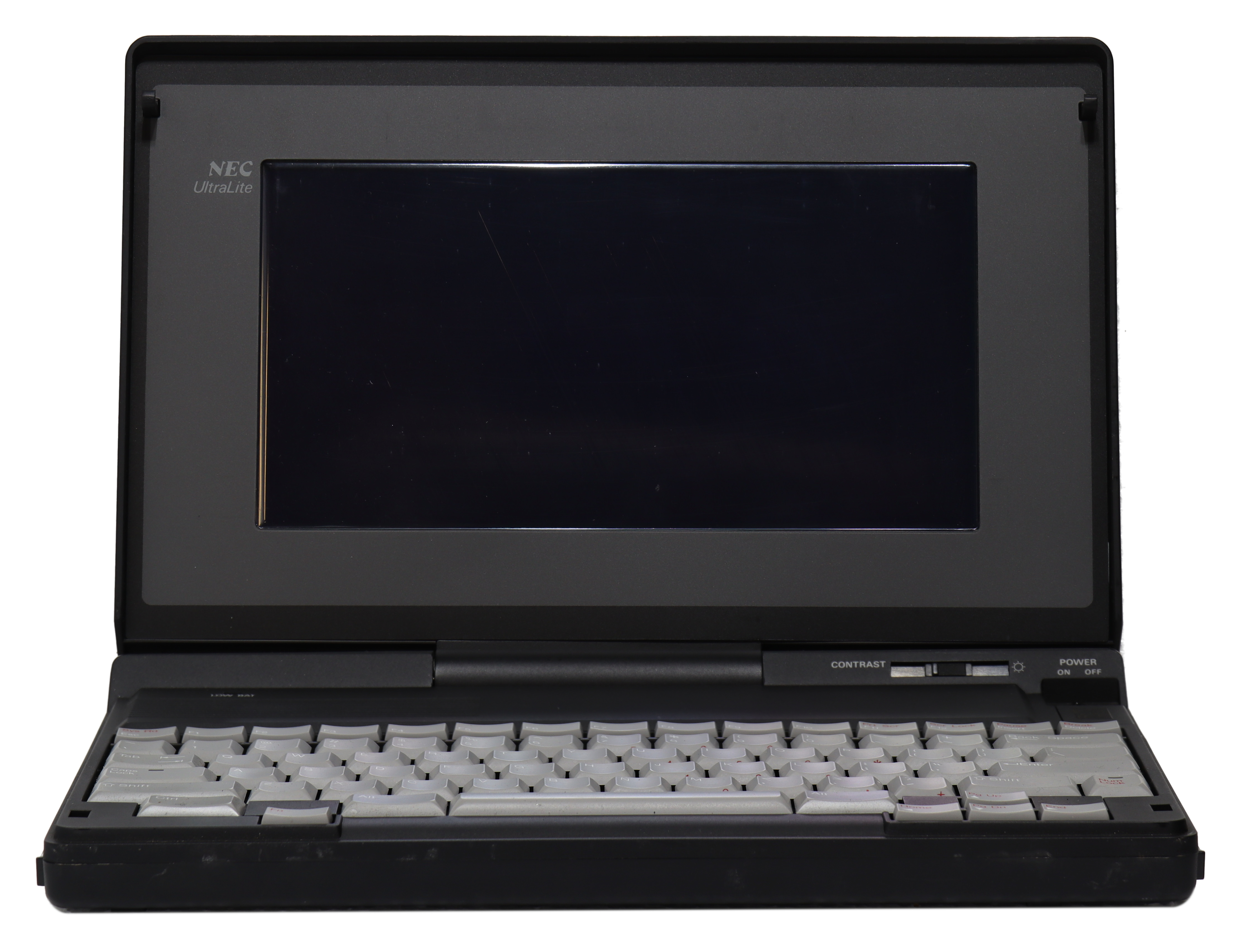
- Developer: NEC
- Type: Laptop (notebook)
- Released: October 1988; 37 years ago
- Introductory price: US$4,000 to US$5,000
- Operating system: MS-DOS 3.3
- CPU: NEC V30 at 4.92 MHz and 8.14 MHz
- Memory: 640k RAM
- Display: Supertwist electroluminescent backlit 8.25x4.25 LCD screen
- Graphics: CGA compatible, 320x200x4 or 640x200x2
- Connectivity: built-in 2400 bit/s modem
- Power: 12V
- Weight: 4.4 lb (2.0 kg)

The UltraLite is a line of notebook-sized laptops first released by NEC in 1988. The original model was released in October 1988, alongside the heavier and more-capable ProSpeed. The UltraLite was the first notebook computer on the market compatible with the IBM PC. The original model was based on the NEC V30 microprocessor; the computer includes MS-DOS 3.3 built into ROM.

PC Magazine featured the UltraLite on its cover in November 1988 and shortly thereafter journalists began referring to any A4-sized computer as "notebooks", to distinguish them from the larger and heavier laptops of the time.

== Specifications ==
- Storage: battery-backed storage memory (non-volatile RAM drive)
  - PC-17-01 had 1 MB
  - PC-17-02 had 2 MB
- RS-232C port
- ROM/RAM card slot (NEC proprietary interface)
- optional accessories:
  - external 3.5 inch floppy drive reader
  - SRAM cards using proprietary interface
  - ROM cards using proprietary interface
  - parallel port adapter cable
- internal software in 456 Kb integrated ROM
  - MS-DOS 3.3
  - Laplink 2
  - Microsoft DOS Manager Version 2.0

== History ==
The product was originally developed by an NEC Japan telecommunications engineering team that was trying to make an inexpensive lightweight terminal for programming PABX systems. In 1988, as NEC was trying to create products to update their best selling MultiSpeed, the NEC engineering team in charge of developing personal computers showed the UltraLite to a product management team from NEC Home Electronics USA.

Tom Martin, the Vice President in charge of the group, asked, "Can you make this thing run MS-DOS"? When an affirmative response was received, the NEC team knew they had a hit product on their hands.

The product was launched shortly before COMDEX in October 1988 at a gala event in New York City. It was applauded by the media, who were dying to find a small lightweight computing platform that could be used for note-taking and article writing. Unfortunately the publicity surrounding the UltraLite did not reflect itself in consumer demand. This was due to the UltraLite's two Achilles heels ... the lack of a hard drive which prevented storage of one's work (for more than a week or so without charging the internal RAM drive) and the use of a relatively slow 8086-compatible processor when the market was moving to the 80286 class. The main downside to the Ultralite (which weighed only 4 pounds) was its price. It sold for between 4 and 5 thousand dollars which was significantly higher than other, albeit heavier, less innovative, computers of the time. Given its use of the RAM drive boot times were actually faster than 80386 class computers.

So although the UltraLite ushered in a new era in portable computing, its original design as a telecommunications maintenance terminal proved to be its commercial downfall. Commercial success in that product category was not achieved until Compaq launched its LTE brand nearly 12 months later.

== Data storage ==
Data storage can be done by an optional external 720 kb (in fact it supported "Japanese" 1.2 Mb format but did not support more common 1.44 Mb) 3.5-inch floppy drive, by the internal non-volatile RAM drive (silicon hard drive), or by proprietary RAM and ROM cards. The internal RAM drive is powered by an auxiliary battery inside the unit which needs to be recharged every week or so in order to keep the contents of the RAM drive. The credit-card sized, battery-powered RAM cards come with capacity sizes of 256 kb or 512 Kb. Both RAM cards and ROM cards use a proprietary NEC interface because this laptop came out at a time when there were no standard portable computing interfaces. The PCMCIA standard did not exist until 1990. The RAM cards were powered by a replaceable 3 volt lithium coin battery and had a write-protect switch.

=== ROM cards ===
Software can be bought running from ROM cards. Examples include:

- Lotus 123
- Lotus Agenda
- Lotus Metro/Express
- WordPerfect 5.0
- WordStar
- Microsoft Works

== Other models ==
There are other models in the NEC Ultralite series—for example, the Ultralite SX/20, which was released in 1991. The Ultralite SX/20 had a 80386 processor and runs Microsoft Windows 3.0

Others in the series include the NEC Ultralite 286F, 286V, and the NEC UltraLite Versa models.

== See also ==
- History of laptops
- Grid Compass
- HP 200LX
