= NEC MultiSpeed =

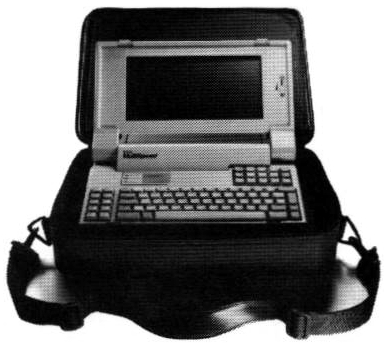
- Original MultiSpeed in its carrying case
- Developer: NEC
- Manufacturer: NEC
- Type: Laptop
- Released: December 1986
- Operating system: MS-DOS
- CPU: NEC V30 at 4.77/9.54 MHz
- Display: Passive monochrome LCD
- Graphics: CGA
- Successor: ProSpeed

The MultiSpeed was a line of laptop computers developed by NEC between 1986 and 1988. The inaugural MultiSpeed was the first battery-powered laptop with a 16-bit microprocessor, sporting a NEC V30 clocked at either 4.77 MHz or 9.54 MHz. The clock speed was able to be changed via a DIP switch on the back, hence the name MultiSpeed. The MultiSpeed received positive reviews in the press and performed well in the marketplace, becoming the top-selling laptop in the United States in early 1988, per one survey.

== Models ==
NEC MultiSpeed
Model no.	Processor	Clock speed (MHz)	LCD technology	LCD resolution	Notes	Date
original	NEC V30	4.77/9.54	Monochrome passive, non-backlit	CGA, 640×200		December 1986
EL	NEC V30	4.77/9.54	Monochrome passive, electroluminescent backlight	CGA, 640×200	EL upgrade path was available to owners of the original	June 1987
HD	NEC V30	4.77/9.54	Monochrome passive, electroluminescent backlight	CGA, 640×200	Sold 55,000 units in 1988	October 1987
EL Model 2	NEC V30	4.77/9.54	Monochrome passive, electroluminescent backlight	CGA, 640×200	Improved EL panel	March 1988
