= ThinkPad Power Series =

Series of laptops by IBM

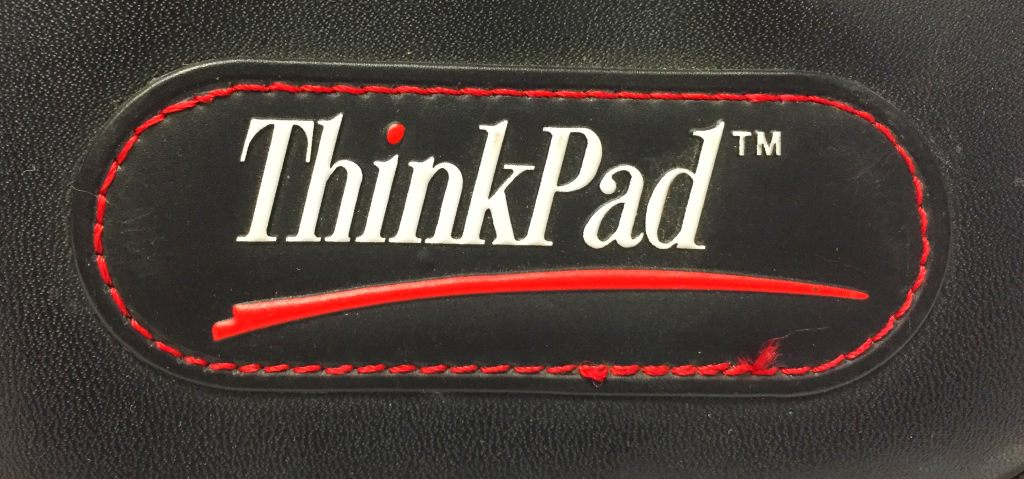
- PowerPC ThinkPad logo on the 850 carrying case

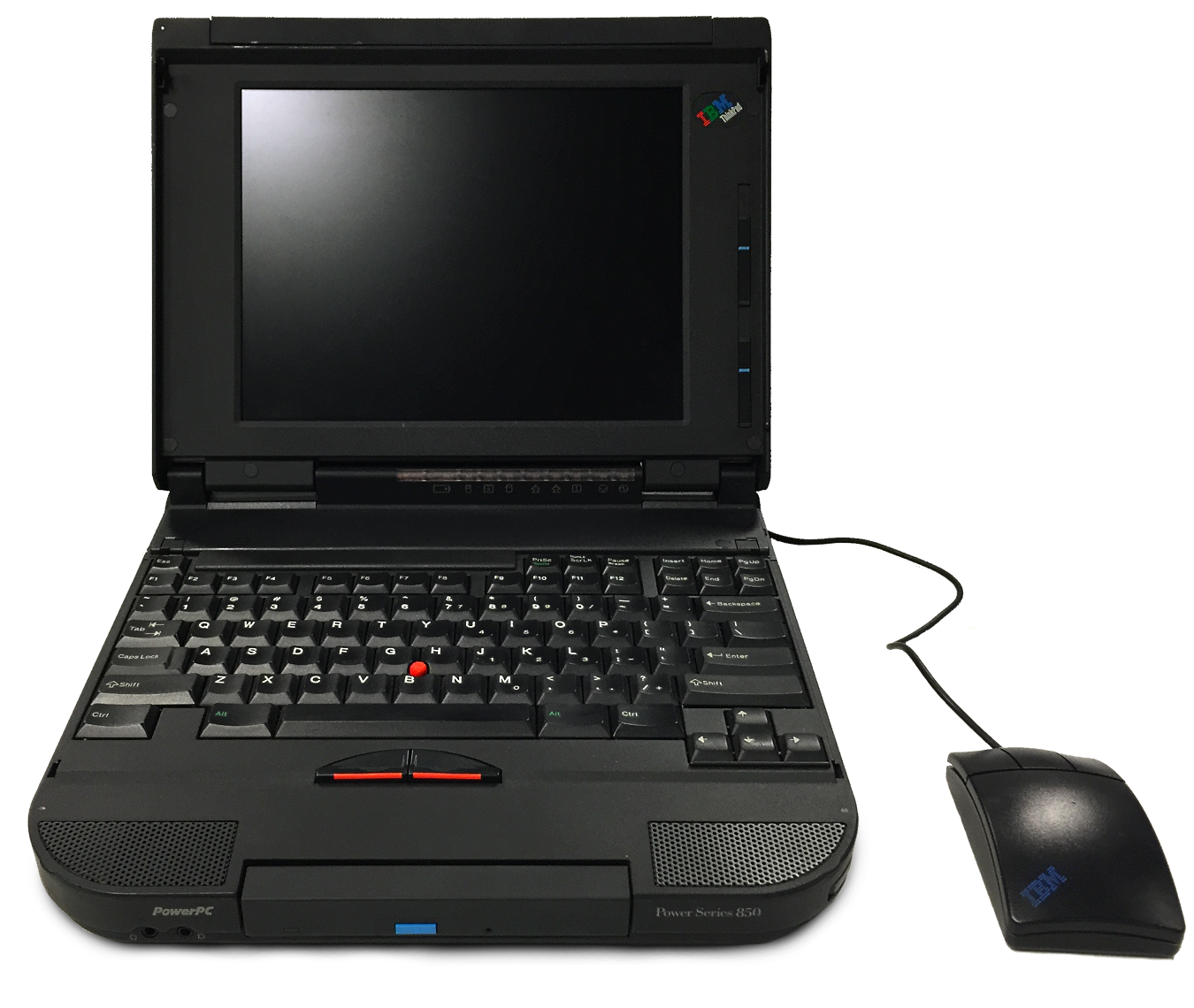
- An IBM ThinkPad 850 with its custom IBM-branded Logitech Chroma mouse
- Manufacturer: IBM
- Product family: ThinkPad
- Type: Laptop
- Released: March 8, 1994
- Discontinued: January 30, 1998
- Operating system: Windows NT, AIX, Solaris
- CPU: PowerPC 603
- Predecessor: IBM RS/6000
- Successor: IBM RS/6000
- Website: At the Wayback Machine: 820 and 850; 860

The ThinkPad Power Series (and subsequent IBM RS/6000 Model 860 Notebook) is a laptop series by IBM based on PowerPC.

== History ==
The first PowerPC notebook released by IBM was the RS/6000 Model N40, which was developed together with Tadpole Computer. It was announced in March 1994. The start of the sale was announced in October 1994.

== Specifications ==
Most of the 800 Series laptops used the PowerPC 603e CPU, at speeds of 100 MHz, or 166 MHz in the 860 model, although the earliest 800 (Type 6020), the direct ancestor of the 850, used a 603 and was apparently only offered to developers. All units used SCSI-2 instead of IDE hard disks, and the ID of every SCSI device on the system could be configured in the cursor driven GUI-based BIOS. Another unusual aspect of the series is their unique startup chime, reminiscent of Apple Macintosh computers of the time.

The PowerPC ThinkPad line was considerably more expensive than the standard x86 ThinkPads — even a modestly configured 850 cost upwards of $12,000. On the other hand, the 800, 850 and 851 (and later the 860 and 861) were capable of supporting an optional web camera, one of the first commercially available webcams available on a laptop. These units could also record PAL and NTSC signals with onboard composite connectors, and the batteries contained internal processors to regulate power usage for optimized battery longevity.

== Software ==
All of the PowerPC ThinkPads could run Windows NT 3.51 and 4.0, AIX 4.1.x, and Solaris Desktop 2.5.1 PowerPC Edition. Many of these PowerPC operating systems and the corresponding compilers are very scarce and hard to find. However, it is also possible to run certain PowerPC versions of Linux on the 800 Series.

== Models ==
Name	Model number	Announced	Withdrawn	CPU	GPU	Memory Bus	Maximum Memory	Display	Video Capture	Operating System
800	6020	1994/11/08	Unknown	603 @ 66 MHz	GT10	32 bit	80 MB	10.4" 640 × 480	built-in	
820	6040	1995/06/19	1996/03/20	603e @ 100 MHz	GT10	32 bit	48 MB	10.4" 640 × 480 or 800 × 600	optional	
821/822/823	7247	1996/02/20	1996/07/26	603e @ 100 MHz	GT10	32 bit	48 MB	10.4" 640 × 480 or 800 × 600	optional	
850	6042	1995/06/19	1996/03/20	603e @ 100 MHz	GT10	64 bit	96 MB	10.4" 640 × 480 or 800 × 600	built-in	
851	7249	1996/02/20	1996/11/08	603e @ 100 MHz	GT10	64 bit	96 MB	10.4" 640 × 480 or 800 × 600	built-in	
860	7249	1996/10/08	1998/01/30	603e @ 166 MHz	GT20	64 bit	96 MB	12.1" 1024 × 768	built-in	

The ThinkPad Power Series 800 (6020) has a new case design, similar to contemporary 700 series models, but with additional rounded palmrest.

The ThinkPad Power Series 820 has another case design (square case with small palmrest with two speakers). This model has reported running SuSE Linux and Windows NT 4.0 and that they are incompatible with Yaboot. The availability started at April 15, 1996.

The ThinkPad 821/822/823 model was just an upgrade of the 820 model.

The ThinkPad Power Series 850 (6042-G6D) has a similar case to an 800 model. This model has a motion video capture card and optional snap-in video camera.

The ThinkPad 851 was just an upgrade of the 850 model.

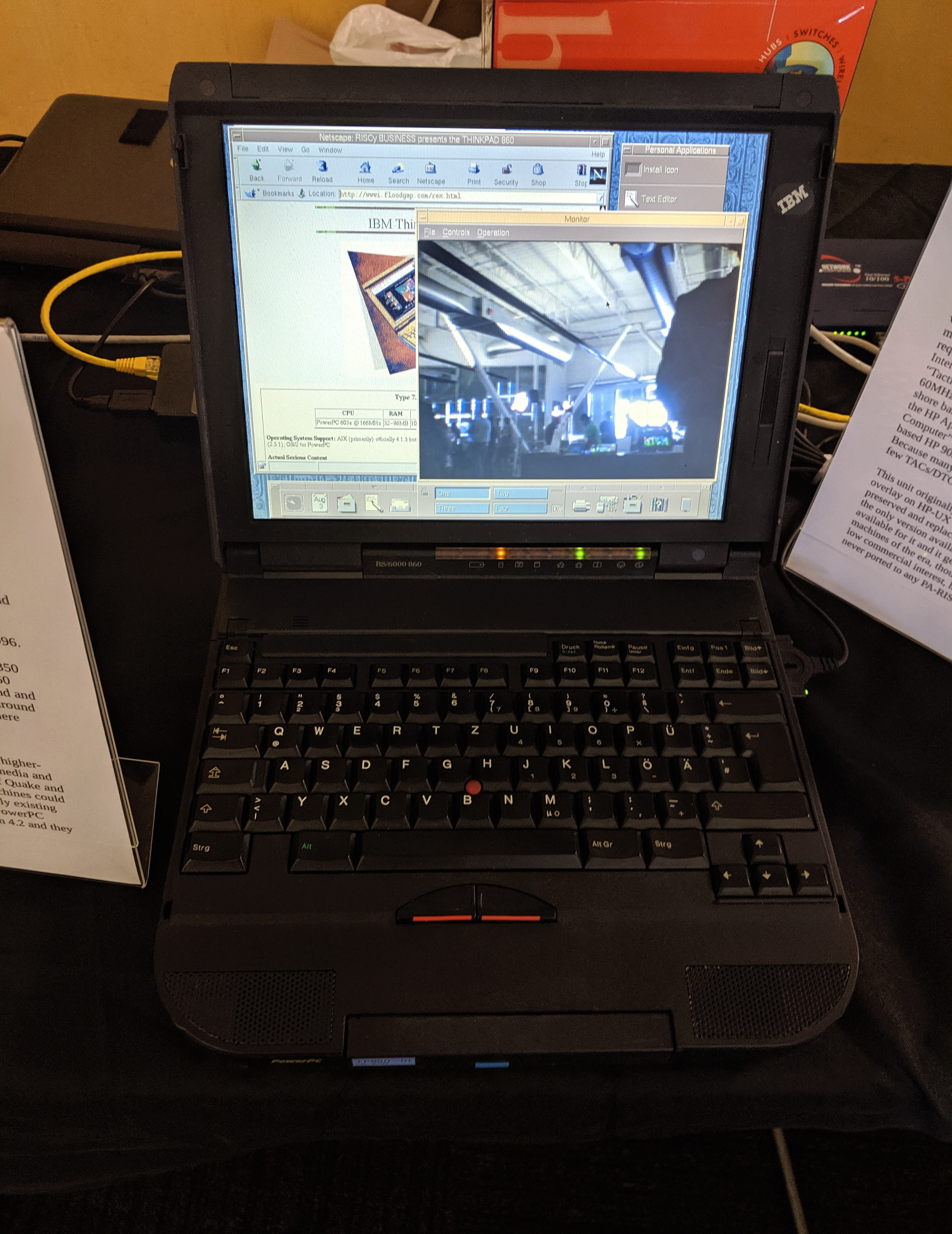
RS/6000 860

The IBM RS/6000 Notebook 860, sometimes incorrectly to referred as ThinkPad 860 can be seen as the successor of the ThinkPad 850.

=== Others ===
The ThinkPad line have a predecessor model (released in 1994 RS/6000 N40 with 50 MHz PowerPC 601 CPU and with design based on a Tadpole platform).

The Power Series 600 was a prototype of a compact desktop system; this model was never released, and only prototypes can be found.

Released by Canon Computer Systems in 1995, the Canon Power Notebook featured a 603e clocked at 100 MHz with 256 KB of external cache; 32 to 48 MB of RAM; an 810 MB hard drive; a double-speed CD-ROM drive; and a 10.4" active matrix color LCD. Though not marketed by IBM, Canon licensed the use of several components from the ThinkPad 755CD including the plastic case, and externally the Power Notebook was virtually identical to the 755CD save for Canon's logos.
