= Tandy 1400 LT =

Laptop computer (1987 to 1991)

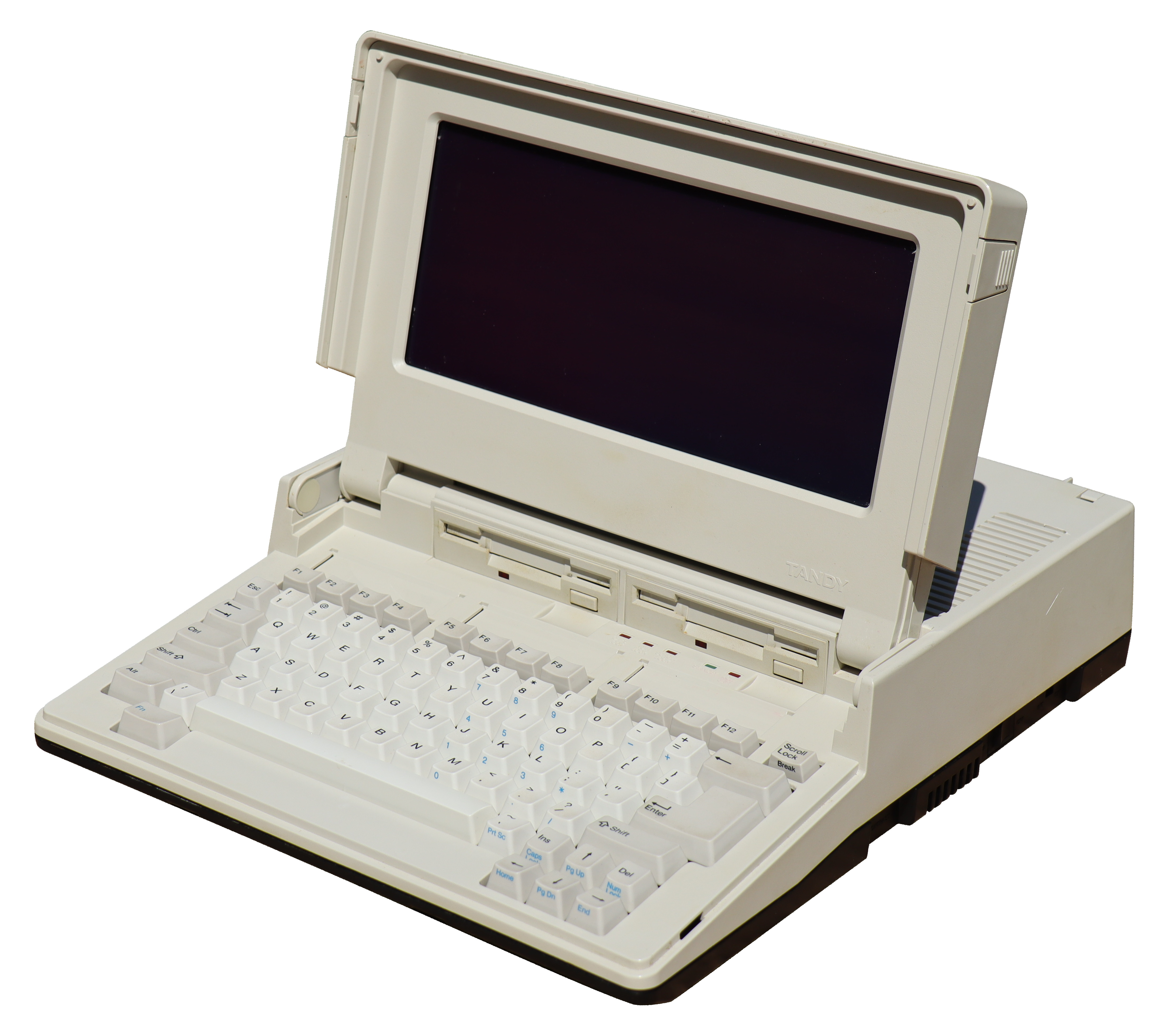
- Tandy 1400 LT laptop
- Released: November 1987; 38 years ago
- Introductory price: US$1599
- Discontinued: 1991; 35 years ago
- Operating system: MS-DOS
- CPU: NEC V20 @ 7.16 MHz / 4.77 MHZ
- Memory: 768 KB
- Storage: Dual 3.5-inch floppy drives
- Display: 9" monochrome CGA-compatible back-lit LCD, external color monitor, composite video
- Graphics: 80x25 and 40x25 (text), 640x200 and 320x200 (graphics)
- Connectivity: Parallel port, RS-232
- Dimensions: 3.5 by 14.5 by 12.5 inches when closed
- Weight: 13.5 lbs (5 kg)
- Successor: 1400 FD, 1400 HD

The Tandy 1400 LT is the first MS-DOS compatible laptop sold by Tandy Corporation. Introduced in November 1987, it had two 3.5 inch floppy drives and a flip-up monochrome LCD screen, powered by an internal battery.

== Features ==
The 1400LT (catalog number 25-3500) had two 3.5 inch floppy diskettes with a capacity of 720 KB each. The processor was the Intel 8088–compatible NEC V20, with a clock speed of 7.16 MHz or 4.77 MHZ for compatibility with IBM PC programs. The system came with 768 KB of RAM. A socket was provided for an optional 8087 numeric coprocessor. The 9" back-lit monochrome LCD screen had a resolution of 640 × 200 pixels and was IBM CGA compatible, mapping colors to grayscale. Text modes supported included 80 × 25 and 40 × 25.

The computer came with a parallel printer port, 9-pin RS-232 serial port, and a socket for an external color monitor and a composite video output. The system also had a DIN socket to accept a PC XT-style external keyboard. Two internal slots allowed for installation of an optional internal 1200-baud modem or other devices. The system had an internal battery-backed real-time clock.

The system could operate from AC power with an external adapter, which also charged the internal battery. The system could operate for about four hours on the battery, which was replaceable by the user.

The unit weighed about 13.5 lbs (5 kg) and was approximately 3.5 by 14.5 by 12.5 inches (8.9 by 36.8 by 31.8 cm) when closed.

At introduction, the computer list price was US$1599.

For interchange of data with desktop systems, Tandy later made available an external 5.25-inch diskette drive.

Later revised designs were the 1400 FD, which was lighter, omitted the composite video port, and had an external floppy drive connector. The 1400 HD was similar to the FD but replaced one internal floppy drive with a 20 megabyte hard drive. All members of the 1400 family were dropped from Radio Shack catalogs after 1991.

== Similar systems ==
The clamshell design of the Tandy 1400 was similar to that of the earlier Data General/One and IBM PC Convertible. Although the battery life of the 1400 LT was less than that of the IBM Convertible, the system came with more standard peripheral connections and was priced significantly lower.
