= Canon V-20 =

Microcomputer

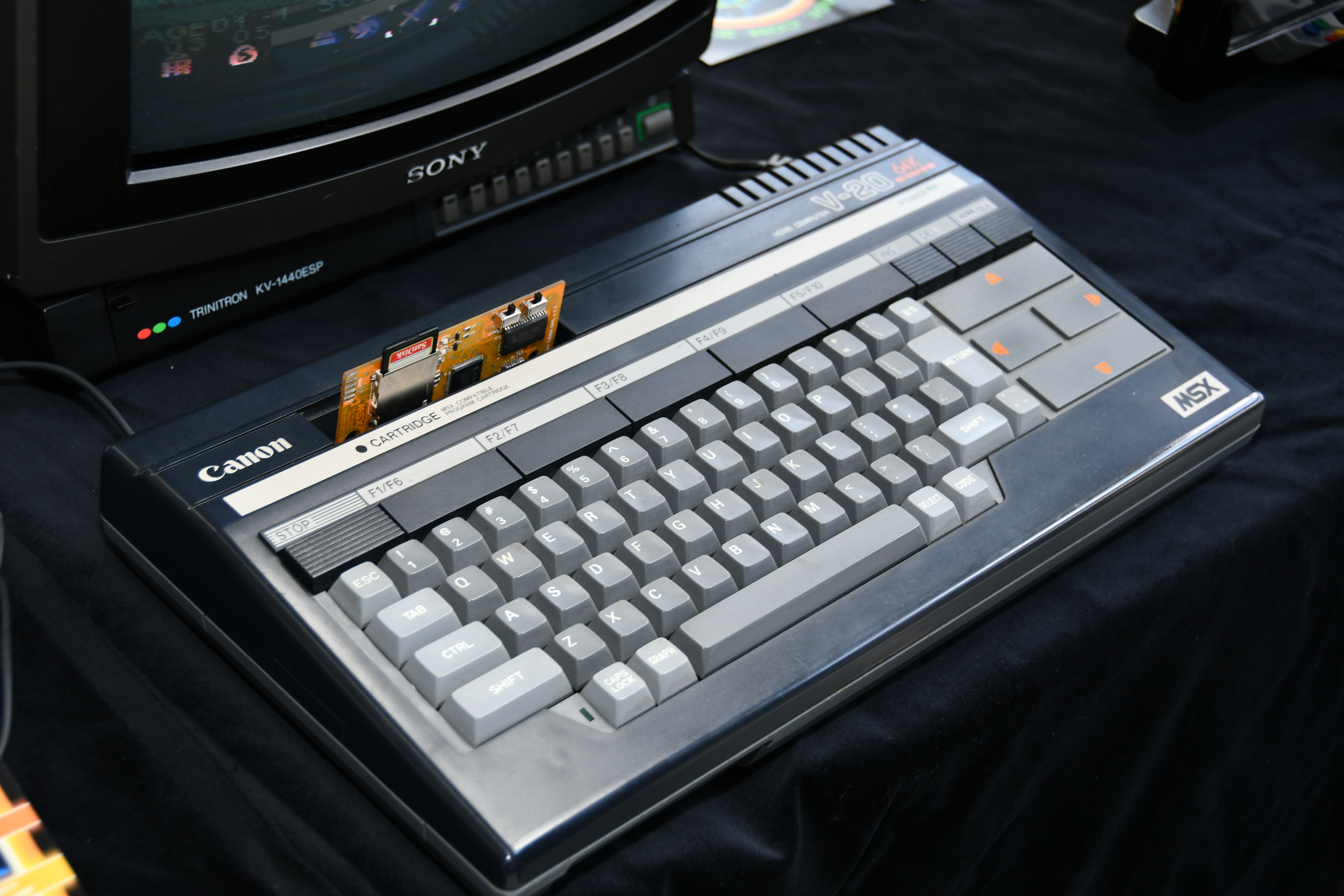
- Type: home computer
- Released: 1983
- Operating system: MSX BASIC
- CPU: NEC 780C @ 3.25 MHz
- Memory: 64 KB

The Canon V-20 was a MSX microcomputer made by the Japanese corporation Canon. It had an innovative digital camera interface (T-90/DMB-90) to use with the Canon T90.

== Canon V-10 ==
The V-10 was quite identical to the V-20, except that it had less RAM memory (just 16 KB) and a white case.

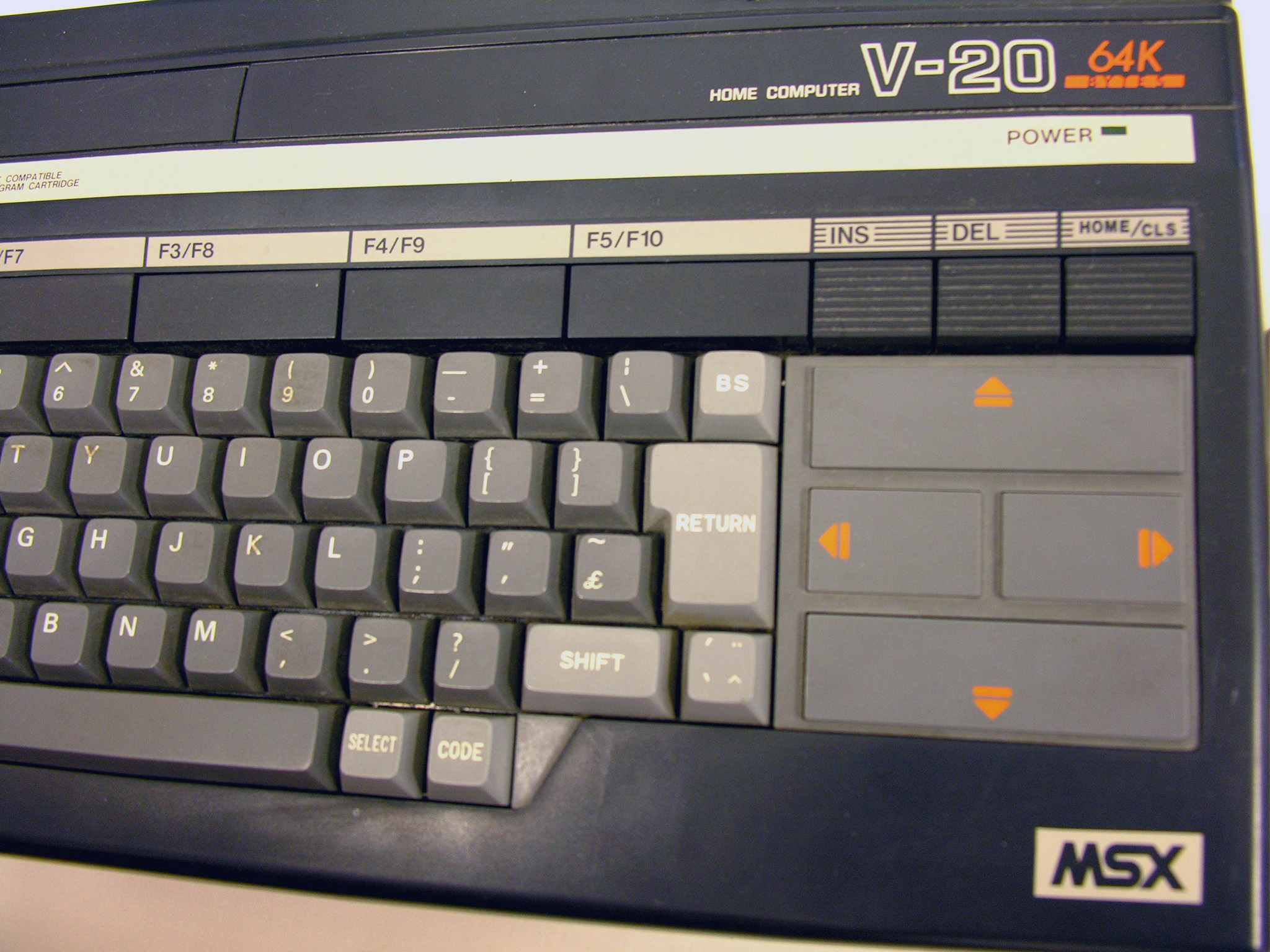
close view of navigation block

== Technical specifications ==
CPU	Zilog Z80A @ 3.25 MHz
RAM	64 KB
VRAM	16 KB (TMS9918)
ROM	32 KB
Keyboard	mechanic, 73 keys (with 4 cursor keys)
Display	text: 40×24 rows; graphics: 256×192 pixels, 16 colours, 32 sprites
Sound	General Instrument AY-3-8910 (PSG), 3 voices, white noise
Ports	2 joystick connectors, TV out, sound out, tape recorder connector, parallel port, 2 cartridge slots
Storage	tape recorder (2400 bps) or one or two external 3 1/2 in (89 mm) disk drive Canon VF-100 (720 KB)
