= Bondwell-2 =

- Manufacturer: Bondwell
- Type: laptop personal computer
- Released: 1985; 41 years ago
- Introductory price: US$995 (equivalent to $2,979 in 2025)
- Operating system: CP/M
- CPU: Zilog Z80 CPU @ 4 MHz
- Memory: 64 kB RAM and 4 kB ROM
- Storage: 720 KB 3.5" floppy disk drive
- Display: flip-up LCD / 80x25 text characters.
- Graphics: 640x200 pixels

The Bondwell-2 is an early laptop personal computer running the CP/M operating system. Introduced by Bondwell in 1985, it came with a Zilog Z80 CPU clocked at 4 MHz, 64 kB RAM and 4 kB ROM. It had a 3.5" floppy disk drive, highly unusual for a CP/M system, as this OS was largely outmoded by the time 3.5" drives were introduced.

The Bondwell-2's main attraction was its price, at 995 USD. It also included MicroPro's complete line of CP/M software, including WordStar. Also unusually for a CP/M system, the Bondwell-2 could display bitmapped graphics. The flip-up LCD's resolution was 640x200 pixels, or 80x25 text characters. A 300 baud modem was available as an option.
