= Acer Gemstone =

Acer Gemstone is a multimedia/gaming laptop series from Acer. The Acer Gemstone Blue series includes features such as Blu-ray optical device, DDR3 memory module etc.

This series consist of mainly four notebook models.

- 6935G
- 8930G
- 6920G
- 8920G

Other variations of these models exist such as the 8930.
