= Samsung Series 7 Slate =

Tablet computer

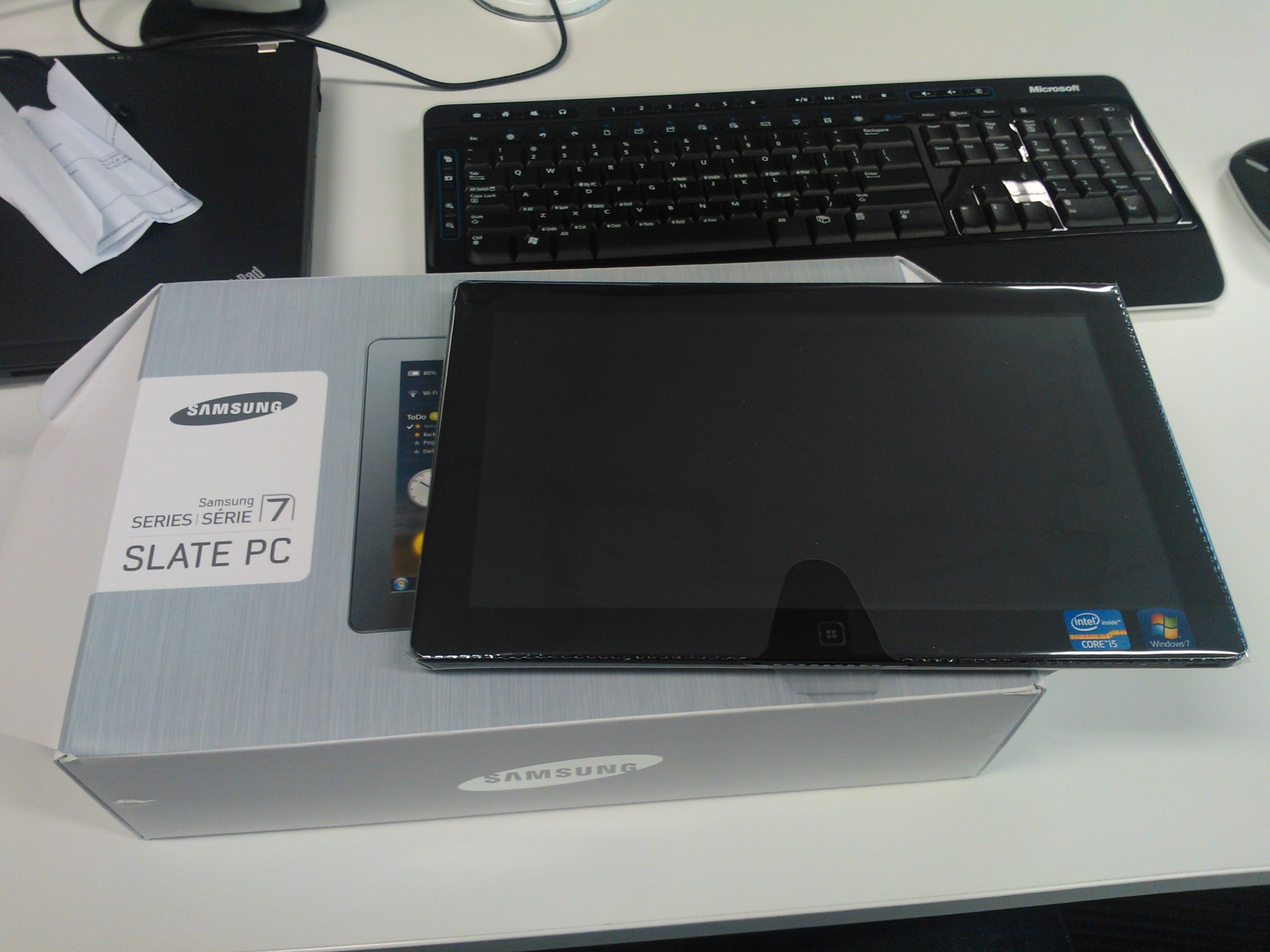
- Developer: Samsung Electronics
- Manufacturer: Samsung Electronics
- Type: Tablet PC
- Operating system: Windows 7 (64-bit)
- CPU: 1.6 GHz dual-core Intel Core i5 2467M processor
- Memory: 4 GB
- Storage: 64/128 GB flash memory (expandable with an external microSD card)
- Display: 11.6 inch, 1366×768 px PLS display
- Graphics: Intel HD Graphics 3000
- Input: Multi-touch screen
- Camera: 3.0 MP (rear), 2.0 MP (front facing)
- Connectivity: Wi-Fi 802.11a/b/g/n, Bluetooth 3.0, USB 2.0, micro HDMI, microSD, 3.5mm headphone jack
- Power: 5,520 mAh battery
- Dimensions: 11.66" x 0.51" x 7.24" (269 mm x 12.9 mm x 184 mm)
- Weight: 1.89 lb. (860 g)
- Predecessor: none
- Successor: Samsung Ativ Tab 7
- Related: Samsung Windows Developer Preview PC
- Website: web.archive.org/web/20140620173318/http://www.samsung.com/us/computer/pcs/xe700t1a-a05us/

The Samsung Series 7 Slate, XE700T1A, is a 11.6-inch (29 cm) tablet manufactured by Samsung. The Slate 7 was announced on August 31, 2011, incorporates a dual-core 1.6 GHz Intel Core i5-2467M (Sandy Bridge) processor, and runs the Windows 7 Home Premium or Professional operating system.

== Hardware ==
The Samsung Series 7 Slate is built using a mixture of plastic and glass. A micro HDMI port, MicroSD slot, and a full-size USB 2.0 port are incorporated into the design, as well as a volume rocker, power button, rotation lock, headphone jack and charging port located on the sides. A physical home button is located directly below the screen. A dock connector is located on the bottom. The Series 7 Slate uses a 11.6-inch (29 cm) PLS display at a resolution of 1366x768. The tablet is available with either 64 or 128 GB of internal storage which is expandable via an external microSD card.

== Reception ==
Engadget praised the Series 7 Slate's bright display and responsive touchscreen. It was also said that there are useful accessories - a stylus, Bluetooth keyboard and a dock with USB 2.0, Ethernet, full HDMI port and line in/out jack. Overall the device is one of the best Windows 7 tablets around. The Application Guide is available.

== Samsung Windows Developer Preview PC ==
Microsoft during its BUILD 2011 conference announced that it's giving away 5,000 Samsung-built developer "PCs" to attendees, with AT&T's 3G service. Each of the 5,000 attendees of Microsoft's getting a 700T Windows Developer Preview tablet PC and Bluetooth keyboard combo loaded with the Developer Preview of Windows 8 (8102.winmain_win8m3) and different UEFI. Although the device was claimed to be a prototype, was near identical (with hardware differences) to the production-version of the Samsung Series 7 Slate PC model 700T1A. It is also the same secret device shown off at TechEd New Zealand earlier in 2011.
