= Huawei Qingyun L540 =

Chinese laptop (2023)

Qingyun L540 is a Chinese laptop computer product of Huawei released in 2023 with market target to Enterprise and China's public sector. It uses ARM technology Kirin 9006c SoC microprocessor 5 nm architecture, supports 16 GB RAM, 512 GB UFS. It has a 14-inch 4k display. Its predecessor Huawei Qingyun L420 with English name called, 'Dyna Cloud L420' model released in 2021 from TSMC 2020 production of the same stockpiled chips. The first model, Huawei Qingyun L410 featured, Kirin 990 released in May 2021, earlier in the year, that runs Unity Operating System like all successor models.
