= Clevo =

Taiwanese laptop design and manufacturing company

- Formerly: Nan Tan Computer (1983–1997)
- Type: Public (TWSE: 2362)
- Industry: Computing
- Founded: 1983; 43 years ago
- Headquarters: Taiwan
- Products: Laptops; AIO computers Rugged computers
- Number of employees: 909
- Website: www.clevo.com.tw

Clevo (Chinese: 藍天電腦; pinyin: Lántiān diànnǎo; lit. 'Blue Sky Computers') is a Taiwanese OEM/ODM computer manufacturer that produces laptop computers. They sell bare-bones laptop chassis (barebooks) to value-added resellers who build customized laptops for individual customers.

== History ==
Clevo was founded in 1983 as Nan Tan Computer (NTC). In 1987, the company established its laptop computer business, with production starting in 1990. In 1992, NTC set up Clevo, a U.S. subsidiary which would distribute its laptops in the country. NTC later adopted the Clevo name for itself and first listed on the Taiwan Stock Exchange in 1997. In 1999, Clevo merged with their subsidiary, Kapok, to increase efficiency. In August 2002, Clevo had built a new factory in Kunshan, China.

== Models ==
Name	Processor	Chipset	GPU	RAM	Storage	Networking	Audio	Operating system	Display
x7200	Intel Core i7-980X/990X		Nvidia GeForce/AMD Radeon	6 GB				Windows 7	17.3 inches
P670SE	Intel Core i7-4720HQ		NVIDIA GeForce GTX 970M (3 GB GDDR5) with Optimus Technology					Windows 8	17.3 inches
P570WM3	Intel Xeon E5-2630							Windows 8	17.3 inches
x170 KMG	Intel Core i9		Nvidia GeForce RTX 3080	64GB	2TB			Windows 11	17.3 inches
P670SE	Intel Core i7-4720QM		Nvidia GeForce GTX 970M	8GB	1TB			Windows 8	17.3 inches
X170SM-G	10th Gen Intel Core		NVIDIA GeForce RTX Super			Wi-Fi 6 AX	High-definition audio interface, SPDIF digital output, built-in array microphone, built-in two 3W speakers and 5W subwoofer, Sound Blaster Atlas, Super X-fi headphone holography	Windows 10	17.3 inches
PC70DF1	Intel Core i7-10875H		Nvidia GeForce RTX 2070	64GB	1TB			Windows 10	17.3 inches
P775DM3	Intel Core i7-7700K @ 4.2 Ghz		Nvidia GeForce GTX 1080			Qualcomm Killer Gigabit LAN; Wireless LAN 802.11AC/B/G/N (M.2 Interface); Bluetooth V4.0 module	Intel High Definition Audio	Windows 10	17.3 inches
N850HP	Intel Core i7-7700HQ		Nvidia GeForce GTX 1060	128GB	1TB			Windows 10	17.3 inches
N170RD	Intel Core i5-6300HQ		Nvidia GeForce GTX 960M	12GB	120GB+1TB			Windows 10	17.3 inches
NB50TZ	Intel Core i5-9400	H310M	Intel UHD Graphics 630	User installed or 16GB	User installed or Crucial MX500 250GB M.2 SATA SSD	Intel Wireless AC-9650 Realtek R8111 Gigabit Ethernet	Realtek ALC269	Windows 10	LG LP156WFC-SPDA (1920x1080@60hz, 15in)
P870TM1 / P870TM	LGA1151 CPU, up to Intel Core i9 9900K		Nvidia GeForce RTX 2080	128GB	3TB (3 slots)	WLAN / Bluetooth; M.2 2230 Two 10/100/1000 Ethernet LAN on-board; Killer E2400 Support Killer Double Shot-X3 Pro	Sound Blaster X Pro-Gaming 360°	B173HAN03.1	

== See also ==
- List of companies of Taiwan
- Clevo x7200
