= NEC ProSpeed =

Series of laptops by NEC

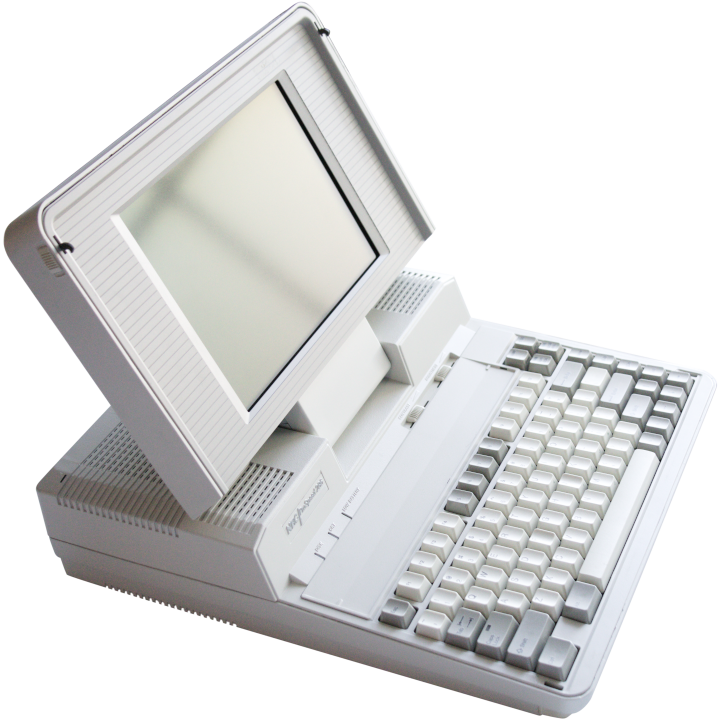
- ProSpeed 286
- Developer: NEC; Jay Halloran; Mark Perry; Mike Pritchett
- Manufacturer: NEC
- Type: Laptop
- Released: October 1988
- Operating system: MS-DOS
- CPU: Intel 80C286 (286); Intel 80386 (386); Intel 80386SX (CSX, 386SX, SX/20); Intel 80486SX (486SX)
- Display: Passive monochrome LCD; Passive color LCD (CSX only); Active color LCD (486SX/C only)
- Graphics: EGA (286 and 386 only); VGA (CSX onward)
- Predecessor: MultiSpeed

The ProSpeed was a line of laptop computers developed by NEC in 1988. It served as the replacement for their earlier MultiSpeed line and was introduced simultaneously with their slimmer and less heavy UltraLite line of notebook computers. The i386SX-equipped CSX model, released in September 1989, was the first laptop with a color LCD. It was also one of the first laptops to be offered with a docking station. The CSX model was featured on the front cover of PC Magazine.

== Models ==
NEC ProSpeed
Model no.	Processor	Clock speed (MHz)	Expansion slots	LCD technology	LCD resolution	Notes	Date
286	Intel 80C286	16 MHz	3	Monochrome passive	EGA, 640×400		October 1988
386	Intel 80386	16 MHz (0.5 w)	3	Monochrome passive	EGA, 640×400		October 1988
CSX	Intel 80386SX	16 MHz	3	Color passive	VGA, 640×480	Wall-powered only	September 1989
386SX	Intel 80386SX	16 MHz	3	Monochrome passive	VGA, 640×480		February 1990
SX/20	Intel 80386SX	20 MHz	3	Monochrome passive	VGA, 640×480		August 1990
486SX/C	Intel 80486SX	20 MHz	3	Color active	VGA, 640×480		June 1991
486SX	Intel 80486SX	20 MHz	3	Monochrome passive	VGA, 640×480		March 1992
