= Mi Notebook Air =

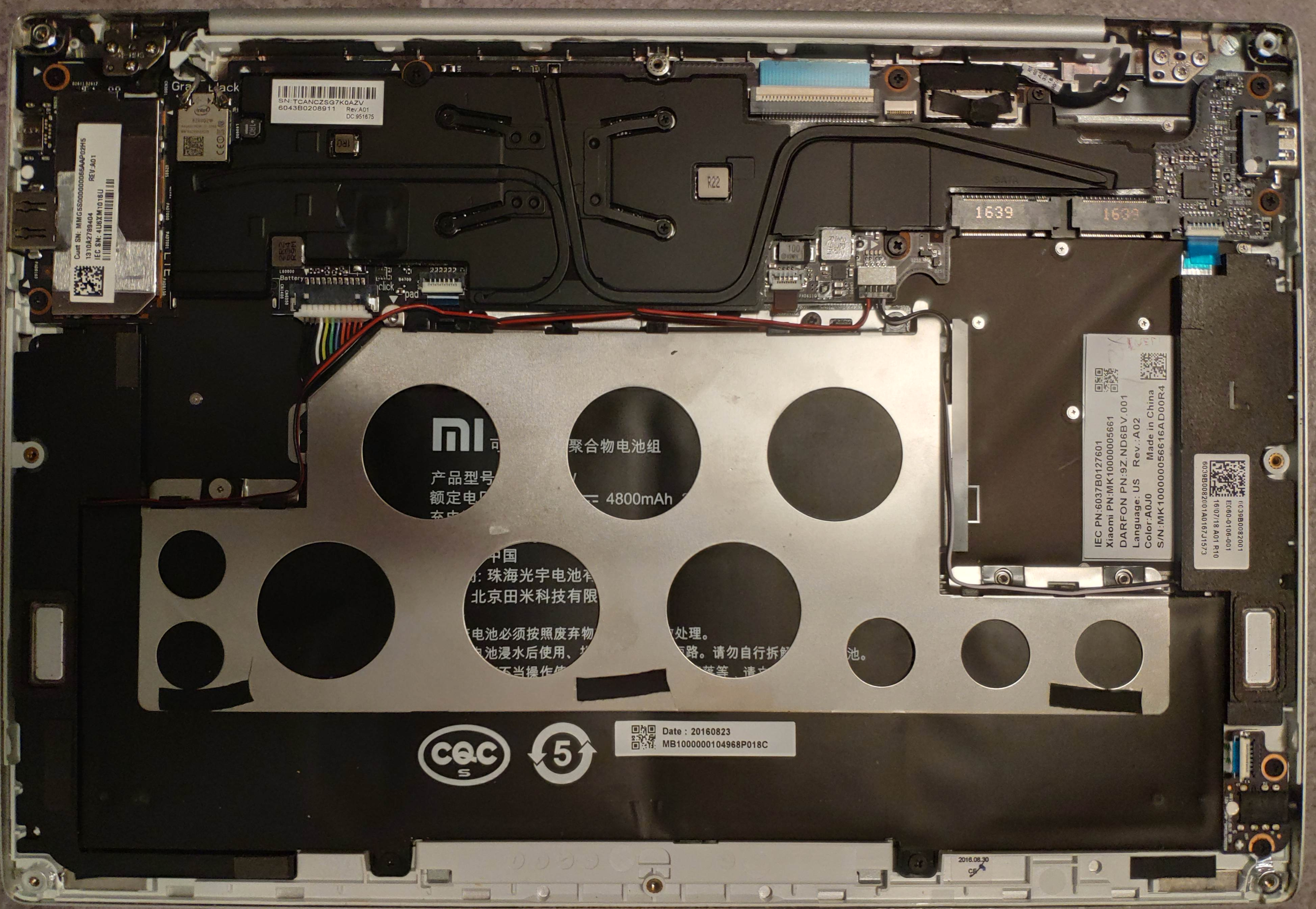
Xiaomi Notebook Air 12.5 Motherboard

The Mi Notebook Air is a portable computer introduced in 2016 by Xiaomi Corporation. There are two versions of the computer, which differ in screen size (12.5-inch and 13.5-inch) and some other hardware elements. The first 12.5-inch generation used an Intel Core M3-6Y30 microprocessor, which was later upgraded to an Intel Core m3-7Y30 microprocessor. Both models feature a 1080p screen with a back-lit keyboard.

== Specifications ==
=== Operating system ===
The Xiaomi Mi Notebook Air is configured with an OEM activated Windows 10 operating system. It supports the most recent Linux distributions, as demonstrated by the Deepin Linux Team.

=== Processor ===
The Mi Notebook Air 13.3" version comes pre-installed with the Intel® Core™ i5 processor and the 12.5" version comes with the Intel® Core™ M3 processor.

=== Motherboard ===
The motherboard installed in the Xiaomi Mi Notebook Air is manufactured by Timi Personal Computing Co. Ltd.

=== Power management ===
The Mi Laptop Air uses a 7.4V/5000mAh 37Wh battery.
