= Market share of personal computer vendors =

The annual worldwide market share of personal computer vendors includes desktop computers, laptop computers, and netbooks but excludes mobile devices, such as tablet computers that do not fall under the category of 2-in-1 PCs. The global market leader has been Lenovo (formerly IBM) in every year since 2013, followed by HP and Dell. Previously, Compaq was the global market leader in the late 1990s until the year 2000, while HP and Dell shared market leadership in the 2000s.

For data about PC vendors' market shares in laptop computers specifically, see Laptop#Historic market share.

== Current top vendors market share (2025) ==
Top 6 vendors by number of units shipped, 2025
Rank	Manufacturer	Country of origin	Market share
1	Lenovo	China	27.2%
2	HP	US	21.3%
3	Dell	US	15.3%
4	Apple	US	9.2%
5	Asus	Taiwan	6.9%
6	Acer	Taiwan	6.3%
-	Other	Various	13.9%

== Historical vendors market share ==
=== 2020s ===
Global PC market share by units, percent (2020–2024)
Rank	2020		2021		2022		2023		2024	
1	Lenovo	24.9	Lenovo	24.4	Lenovo	24.1	Lenovo	24.7	Lenovo	25.5
2	HP	21.2	HP	21.7	HP	19.4	HP	21.9	HP	21.6
3	Dell	16.4	Dell	17.4	Dell	17.5	Dell	16.6	Dell	16.1
4	Apple	8.2	Apple	7.9	Apple	9.8	Apple	9.0	Apple	9.2
5	Asus	6.0	Acer	7.1	Asus	7.2	Asus	7.1	Asus	7.1
6	Acer	5.9	Asus	6.3	Acer	6.5	Acer	6.6	Acer	6.9
Others		22.5		15.1		15.5		14.1		13.7

=== 2010s ===
Global PC market share by units, percent (2010–2019)
Rank	2010		2011		2012		2013		2014		2015		2016		2017		2018		2019	
1	HP	17.9	HP	16.6	HP	16.1	Lenovo	16.9	Lenovo	18.8	Lenovo	19.8	Lenovo	20.7	Lenovo	21.0	Lenovo	22.5	Lenovo	24.1
2	Acer	13.9	Lenovo	12.5	Lenovo	14.9	HP	16.2	HP	17.5	HP	18.2	HP	19.4	HP	20.8	HP	21.7	HP	22.1
3	Dell	12.0	Dell	11.7	Dell	10.7	Dell	11.6	Dell	12.8	Dell	13.6	Dell	14.6	Dell	15.2	Dell	16.2	Dell	16.8
4	Lenovo	10.9	Acer	10.8	Acer	10.2	Acer	8.0	Acer	7.9	Asus	7.3	Asus	7.6	Apple	7.4	Apple	6.9	Apple	7.0
5	Asus	5.4	Asus	5.7	Asus	6.9	Asus	6.6	Asus	7.2	Apple	7.2	Apple	6.9	Asus	6.8	Acer	6.1	Acer	5.6
Others		40.0		42.8		41.2		40.7		35.7		33.9		30.7		28.8		26.6		24.4

=== 2000s ===
Global PC market share by units, percent (2000–2009)
Rank	2000		2001		2002		2003		2004		2005		2006		2007		2008		2009	
1	Compaq	12.8	HP	18.4	HP	14.2	Dell	14.9	Dell	16.4	Dell	16.8	Dell	15.9	HP	18.1	HP	18.2	HP	19.1
2	Dell	10.8	Dell	13.2	Dell	13.2	HP	14.6	HP	14.6	HP	14.6	HP	15.9	Dell	14.2	Dell	14.1	Acer	12.9
3	HP	7.6	IBM	6.4	IBM	5.2	IBM	5.3	IBM	6.8	Lenovo	6.9	Acer	7.6	Acer	9.7	Acer	10.6	Dell	12.1
4	IBM	6.8	NEC	3.8	Fujitsu	3.8	Fujitsu	3.7	Fujitsu	3.8	Acer	4.6	Lenovo	7.0	Lenovo	7.4	Lenovo	7.5	Lenovo	8.0
5	NEC	4.3	Toshiba	2.8	Toshiba	2.8	Acer	2.9	Acer	3.4	Toshiba	3.3	Toshiba	3.8	Toshiba	4.0	Toshiba	4.6	Toshiba	5.0
Others		57.7		55.4		60.9		58.6		55.1		53.8		49.8		46.5		44.9		42.8

=== 1990s ===
Global PC market share by units, percent (1993–1999)
Rank	1993		1994		1995		1996		1997		1998		1999	
1	IBM	10.8	Compaq	10.0	Compaq	10.0	Compaq	10.0	Compaq	13.1	Compaq	13.8	Compaq	13.2
2	Apple	9.4	Apple	8.3	IBM	8.0	IBM	8.6	IBM	8.6	IBM	8.2	Dell	9.8
3	Compaq	8.1	IBM	8.2	Apple	7.8	Packard Bell NEC	6.0	Dell	5.5	Dell	7.9	IBM	7.9
4			Packard Bell	5.2	Packard Bell	5.3	Apple	5.9	HP	5.3	HP	5.8	HP	6.4
5			NEC	4.1	NEC	4.8	HP	4.3	Packard Bell NEC	5.1	Packard Bell NEC	4.3	Packard Bell NEC	5.2
Others				64.3		64.0		65.2		62.2		60.1		57.5

Global PC market share by revenue, percent (1990–1993)
Rank	1990	1991		1992		1993	
1	IBM	IBM	16.3	IBM	13.1	IBM	13.6
2	Apple	Apple	11.2	Apple	10.6	Apple	11.0
3	NEC	NEC	6.4	Compaq	6.1	Compaq	10.0
4	Compaq	Compaq	6.0	NEC	5.0	NEC	5.7
5	Toshiba	-	-	Dell	3.1	Dell	3.8
Others	-	-	-		62.1		55.9

- Toshiba personal computer division was sold to Sharp in 2019, now Dynabook.
- IBM sold its personal computer business to Lenovo in 2005, and its x86 server division in 2014.
- Compaq was acquired by HP in 2002.
- Fujitsu figures include Fujitsu Siemens.
- Figures include desktop PCs, mobile PCs, and servers using the Intel x86 processor architecture. 1996–1999 figures exclude x86 PCs.
- Figures subject to revision in later data releases.

== Unit sales ==
=== Worldwide (1994–2025) ===
Unit sales of global PC market 1994–2009
Year	1994	1995	1996	1997	1998	1999	2000	2001	2002	2003	2004	2005	2006	2007	2008	2009
Units (M)	47.9	59.7	70.9	80.6	92.9	113.5	134.7*	128.1	132.4	168.9	189.0	218.5	239.4	271.2	302.2	305.9
Growth (pct.)	23.3	24.7	17.8	13.7	15.3	22.2	18.7*	-4.9	3.4	27.6	11.9	15.6	9.6	13.3	11.4	1.2

Unit sales of global PC market 2010–2025
Year	2010	2011	2012	2013	2014	2015	2016	2017	2018	2019	2020	2021	2022	2023	2024	2025
Units (M)	351	352.8	352.7	316	315.9	287.7	269.7	262.5	259.4	262.6	275	339.8	286.2	241.8	245.4	270.2
Growth (pct.)	14.7	0.5	-0.0	-10.4	-0.2	-8.9	-6.3	-2.7	-1.3	0.6	4.8	9.9	-16.2	-14.8	1.3	9.1

Sales volume worldwide grew rapidly in the late 1990s but declined briefly around the early 2000s recession. Sales increased again for the rest of the decade though more slowly during the late 2000s recession. After substantial growth in 2010, sales volume started declining in 2012 which continued for seven consecutive years until 2019. A consumer-led spike in PC sales occurred in 2020 and 2021 as a result of stay-at-home orders related to the COVID-19 pandemic.

(*) Figures include desktop PCs, mobile PCs, and servers using the Intel x86 processor architecture. 1996–1999 figures exclude x86 PCs.

=== Worldwide (1975–1995) ===
Personal computer architectures by units sold (1975–1995)
Year	Annual sales	IBM PC compatible	Apple II	Macintosh	Atari 8-bit	Atari ST	Commodore 64	Amiga	PET	Altair	TRS-80	NeXT	Other
1975	5,000	0	0	0	0	0	0	0	0	5,000	0	0	0
1976	46,000	0	0	0	0	0	0	0	0	6,000	0	0	40,000
1977	150,000	0	600	0	0	0	0	0	4,000	10,000	100,000	0	50,000
1978	258,000	0	7,600	0	0	0	0	0	30,000	4,000	150,000	0	100,000
1979	580,000	0	35,000	0	100,000	0	0	0	45,000	0	200,000	0	200,000
1980	724,000	0	78,000	0	200,000	0	0	0	90,000	0	290,000	0	424,000
1981	1,400,000	35,000	210,000	0	300,000	0	0	0	40,000	0	250,000	0	605,000
1982	2,800,000	240,000	279,000	0	600,000	0	200,000	0	10,000	0	300,000	0	1,181,000
1983	4,920,000	1,300,000	420,000	0	500,000	0	2,000,000	0	0	0	200,000	0	500,000
1984	6,322,000	2,000,000	1,000,000	372,000	200,000	0	2,500,000	0	0	0	50,000	0	200,000
1985	7,610,000	3,700,000	900,000	200,000	100,000	100,000	2,500,000	100,000	0	0	10,000	0	0
1986	9,000,000	5,020,000	700,000	380,000	0	200,000	2,500,000	200,000	0	0	0	0	0
1987	9,200,000	5,950,000	500,000	550,000	0	400,000	1,500,000	300,000	0	0	0	0	0
1988	15,000,000	11,900,000	200,000	900,000	0	350,000	1,250,000	400,000	0	0	0	12,000	0
1989	21,000,000	17,550,000	200,000	1,100,000	0	300,000	1,250,000	600,000	0	0	0	12,000	0
1990	20,000,000	16,838,000	100,000	1,300,000	0	300,000	700,000	750,000	0	0	0	12,000	0
1991	18,750,000	14,399,000	100,000	2,100,000	0	300,000	800,000	1,035,000	0	0	0	16,000	0
1992	20,800,000	18,300,000	100,000	2,500,000	0	120,000	300,000	390,000	0	0	0	10,000	0
1993	31,050,000	27,750,000	30,000	3,300,000	0	30,000	175,000	155,000	0	0	0	5	0
1994	41,000,000	37,200,000	0	3,800,000	0	0	0	50,000	0	0	0	0	0
1995	50,000,000	45,880,000	0	4,120,000	0	0	0	42,000	0	0	0	0	0
As of 1995	260,615,000	208,062,000	4,860,200	20,622,000	2,000,000	2,100,000	15,675,000	4,022,000	219,000	25,000	1,550,000	62,000	3,300,000
As of 1995	260,615,000	208,062,000	Combined Apple: 25,482,200		Combined Atari: 4,100,000		Combined Commodore: 19,916,000			25,000	1,550,000	62,000	3,300,000

=== Japan ===
Year	Annual sales (units sold)			NEC		Fujitsu		Sharp		MSX
Year	8-bit	16-bit	Annual	Share	Units	Share	Units	Share	Units	Units
1983	719,000	166,000	885,000	41%	360,000	Unknown	Unknown	13%	120,000	500,000
1984	917,000	279,000	1,200,000	39%	470,000	11%	130,000	20%	240,000	500,000
1985	789,000	398,000	1,200,000	36%	430,000	Unknown	Unknown	9%	110,000	Unknown
1986	685,000	551,000	1,236,000	41%	510,000	9%	110,000	Unknown	Unknown	Unknown
1987	426,000	760,000	1,206,000	45%	540,000	10%	120,000	Unknown	Unknown	340,000
1988	253,000	973,000	1,375,000	51%	700,000	14%	190,000	Unknown	Unknown	150,000
1989	Unknown	Unknown	2,500,000	41%	1,030,000	13%	330,000	Unknown	Unknown	Unknown
1990	Unknown	Unknown	2,300,000	50%	1,100,000	12%	270,000	Unknown	Unknown	Unknown
1991	Unknown	Unknown	3,300,000	52%	1,720,000	12%	430,000	Unknown	Unknown	Unknown
1992	Unknown	Unknown	2,150,000	52%	1,120,000	12%	260,000	Unknown	Unknown	Unknown
1993	Unknown	Unknown	2,300,000	49%	1,200,000	7%	160,000	Unknown	Unknown	Unknown
1994	Unknown	Unknown	Unknown	43%	Unknown	9%	Unknown	Unknown	Unknown	Unknown
1995	Unknown	Unknown	Unknown	40%	Unknown	19%	Unknown	Unknown	Unknown	Unknown
1996	Unknown	Unknown	Unknown	33%	Unknown	23%	Unknown	Unknown	Unknown	Unknown

== See also ==
- List of computer hardware manufacturers
- List of computer system manufacturers
- List of laptop brands and manufacturers
