= Digital Storm =

Privately owned computer manufacturer

- Company type: Private
- Industry: Computer hardware
- Founded: 2002
- Headquarters: 8100 Camino Arroyo; Gilroy, California
- Area served: Worldwide
- Products: Desktops; Notebooks; Peripherals
- Number of employees: 37 (2013)
- Website: digitalstorm.com

Digital Storm is a North American privately owned boutique computer manufacturer in the United States that primarily specializes in high-performance gaming desktop and laptop computers. Headquartered in Gilroy, California, the company also sells upgrade components and gaming peripherals, such as headsets, gaming mice, custom keyboards and high-resolution computer monitors.

== History ==
Digital Storm was founded in 2002. Originally an internet retailer of computer components, the company began building custom gaming PCs after repeated requests by customers for pre-assembled systems. The first custom-built PC system the company ever marketed was the Digital Storm Twister. In 2012, the company began designing proprietary designs, starting with its Aventum and the Bolt models.

== Products ==
Focusing heavily on the gaming market, Digital Storm's designs for gaming desktops and laptops focus primarily on high-performance custom PC configurations, though it also produces workstation models. It specializes in customizing each machine with features such as overclocking, dual video card implementations (such as SLI), RAID arrays, liquid-cooling systems and noise-reduction modifications.

Digital Storm also sells upgrade PC components such as computer memory, video cards, CPUs, motherboards, hard drives, cooling systems and computer monitors. They also offer accessories aimed at gamers.

== Services ==
=== Custom case designs ===
In 2013, it began offering a service called LaserMark, which allows custom images to be etched onto computer cases. Case mods. Aftermarket sound dampening foam can be added to case interior on customer request. Some cases are designed and manufactured in-house, exclusive to digital storm and never sold empty to the public.

=== Overclocking ===
The company offers custom overclocking of CPUs and GPUs through its “Twister Boost” technology on many of its gaming computers.

=== Stress-testing ===
Before shipping out an order, a technician for Digital Storm performs a stress testing and quality control to screen for assembly errors, faulty components and other quality issues. The PC is shipped with a certificate that all tests were passed and a display folio with other paper work, highlighting build specification.

=== Liquid-cooling ===
On most desktop models, Digital Storm offers Hydro Lux, Cryo-TEC Sub-Zero liquid cooling systems. With tubing and fittings in a wide variety of colours, materials and finishes. Such as nickel, painted, gold plated, RGB fittings, copper, PETG (polyethylene tetrafluoride glass), or acrylic tubing. Custom liquid cooling components not offered can be requested (ie EKWB, Raijentek, Gigabyte Wateforce WB).

=== Custom control boards ===
In-house design and manufactured control boards for fan speed, power distribution, temperature and RGB lighting control can be optioned.

=== Shipping ===
In wood crate with expanding foam in PC case to prevent movement of internal hardware.

== Accolades ==
Digital Storm's systems are often reviewed by technology writers and gaming industry publications. For its more notable systems, it has received critical acclaim and awards.

In 2012, the company was recognized as a Design and Engineering Award Honoree for its Cryo-TEC cooling system. The Bolt, Digital Storm's most successful gaming PC model, received Maximum PC's "Kick-Ass Award" in 2013, and also received special attention for the compact design and performance measurements. Ubergizmo called it the "thinnest gaming PC in the world." The Aventum, another of the company's more popular models, won the "2012 Best of What’s New" award from the editors of Popular Science Magazine, who called it a "melt-down proof computer."

== See also ==
- List of computer system manufacturers
