= Husky (computer) =

Computer brand

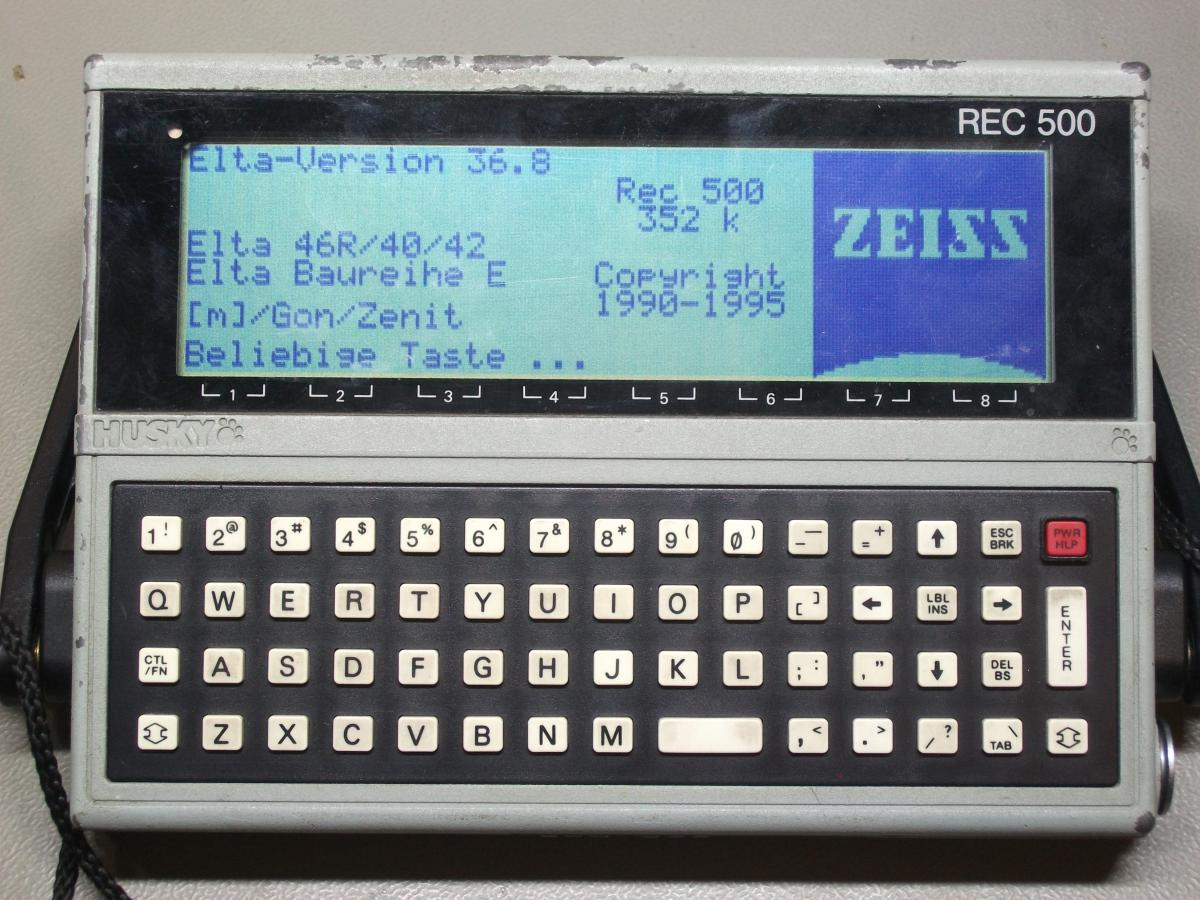
- Husky model 352KEL, marketed as a Zeiss REC-500, running Zeiss software for data management of theodolites, from 1985
- Manufacturer: DVW Microelectronics Ltd; Husky Computers Ltd; WPI Inc.
- Type: Handheld computer; Rugged computer
- Released: December 1981; 44 years ago
- Discontinued: 2000; 26 years ago

The Husky was a line of ruggedized handheld computers released by DVW Microelectronics Ltd (later Husky Computers Ltd) of Coventry. The original Husky 144 model was released in December 1981 in Europe.

The Husky was designed to be used in harsh conditions, such as wet and cold weather, by users such as the military. It is waterproof and can be dropped from a considerable height onto a hard surface without sustaining damage.

The Husky 144 is handheld, with a membrane keyboard similar to that of the ZX81, and a 32×4 alphanumeric LCD. The Husky 144's CPU is a National Semiconductor NSC-800, compatible with the Z80, and the computer has built-in Basic, 32K non-volatile RAM, and 16K ROM. It was initially manufactured in response to a request from Severn Trent and was later used by the Ministry of Defence in the Rapier Missile project.

It was superseded by the Husky Hunter in 1983. The Hunter has a chiclet keyboard, 40×8 display, 48K ROM, and up to 208K RAM. Several Husky variants existed for specific applications.

Husky Computers was acquired by the American company WPI Inc. of Manchester, New Hampshire, in 1997 for US$21 million. The company became then a division of WPI and renamed WPI Husky Computers. This division continued manufacturing and marketing succeeding models of Husky portable computers until 2000, when they were acquired by Itronix.

== Reception ==
BYTE in 1985 described the Husky as "the first lap-held computer". The writer reported that the Hunter "makes every other computer that I've handled feel quite flimsy", and concluded that "not everyone needs one, but if you do, you really need one".
