= Tandy 1100 FD =

Notebook computer by Samsung

- Developer: Tandy Corporation; Panasonic
- Manufacturer: Tandy Corporation
- Type: Laptop
- Released: November 1989; 36 years ago
- CPU: NEC V20 at 8 MHz
- Memory: 640 KB RAM
- Storage: 3.5-inch floppy disk drive
- Display: 9-inch monochrome reflective STN display
- Weight: 6.4 pounds (2.9 kg)

The Tandy 1100 FD is a laptop computer released by Tandy Corporation in 1989. It sought to compete with the Toshiba T1000 and retailed for $999 on its initial release. Panasonic sold a rebadged version of the Tandy 1100 FD as the Business Partner CF-150B. Both received positive reviews.

== Specifications ==
The 1100 FD runs a NEC V20 processor, a derivative of the Intel 8088, clocked at 8 MHz. It features 640 KB of RAM total (non expandable) and has a single 3.5-inch floppy disk drive. It has no internal hard disk drive, nor does it have any provisions for one.

Each 1100 FD features a copy of MS-DOS 3.3 burned into ROM, negating the need for a startup floppy disk. Also burned into ROM is DeskMate, Tandy's graphical operating environment, as well as a word processor running within DeskMate called Text. Several other productivity applications for DeskMate, including a spreadsheet application, a database application, and the PC Link client software for America Online, were provided on included floppy disks due to space limitations on the ROM.

The 1100 FD possesses a 9-inch monochrome STN display capable of displaying CGA graphics. The display lacks a backlight and is instead reflective, bouncing ambient light back to the user in order to increase visibility. Tandy developed this display with Panasonic; they settled on a color combination of blue pixels on a yellow-green reflective background to maximize contrast and readability.

The 1100 FD measures 9.87 by 12.24 by 2.5 inches (25.1 by 31.1 by 6.4 cm) and weighs 6.4 pounds (2.9 kg). (Per Byte, the laptop did not qualify as a notebook because it was marginally too large horizontally to fit in a standard briefcase.) The laptop sports a lead–acid battery, which provided six hours of battery life when the laptop was new. Tandy chose lead–acid over other nascent battery chemistries such as nickel–cadmium due to the latter's susceptibility to the memory effect. The only options Tandy offered for the 1100 FD was a 2,400-baud internal modem and additional battery packs.

== Development ==
The 1100 FD was a co-development between Tandy and Panasonic (then Matsushita Electric in its native country of Japan). It was unveiled in September 1989 and released the following November. As part of their development agreement, in mid-1990 Panasonic introduced a rebadged version of the Tandy 1100 FD called the Business Partner CF-150B. The CF-150B lacks the built-in DeskMate of the 1100 FD but adds a backlight to the LCD. Unlike the 1100 FD, it was upgradable to 1 MB of RAM with an optional memory module.

== Reception ==
Both the 1100 FD and the Business Partner CF-150B received positive reviews from technology critics, who praised its low price and feature set while criticizing its heft and lack of expansion.
