= Mobile workstation =

Larger, bulkier laptop designed to replace a desktop

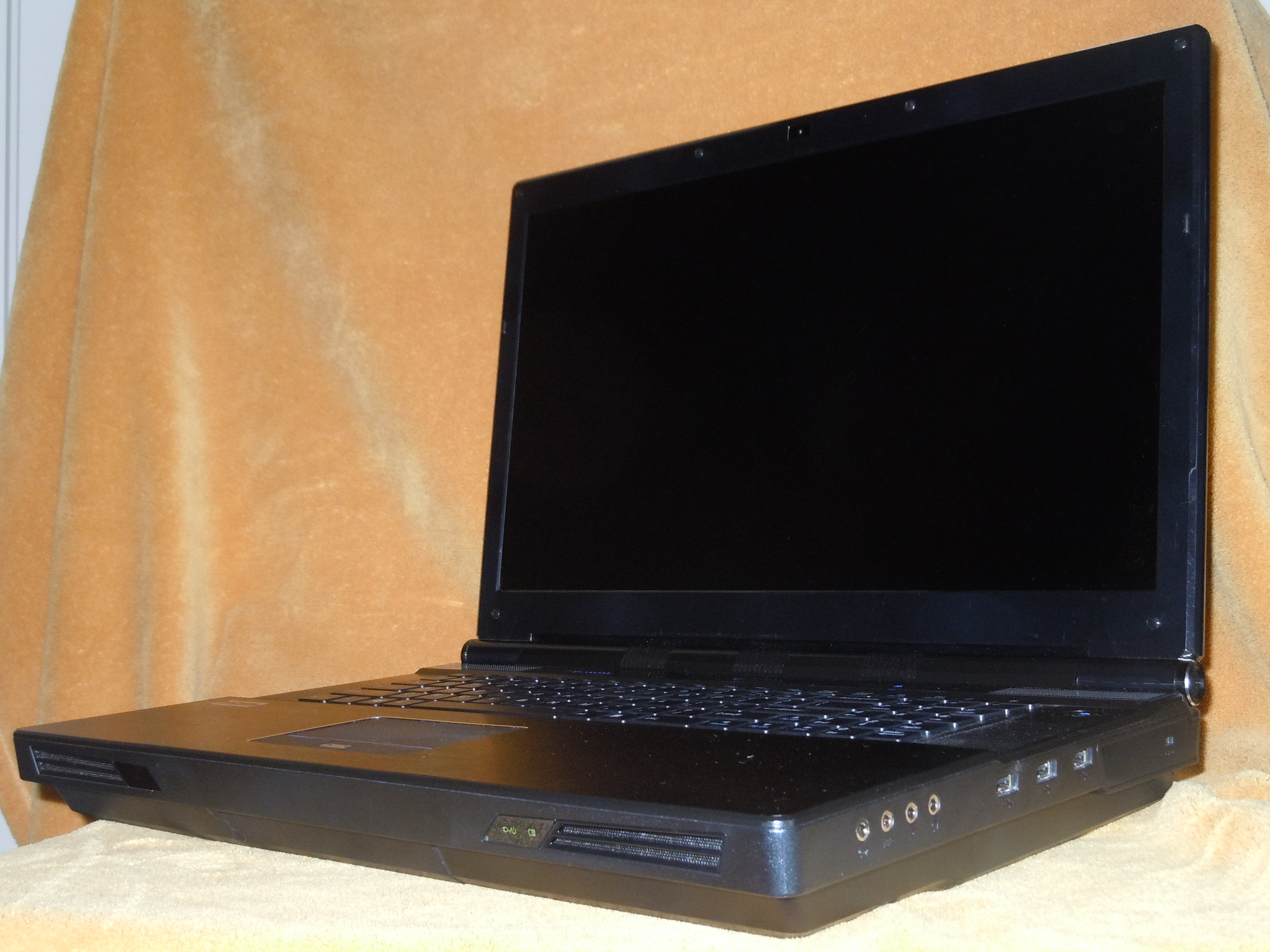
A Clevo x7200 desktop replacement computer

A mobile workstation (Note: Also known as a desktop replacement computer (DTR) or workstation laptop. It is also called desknote, a portmanteau of desktop and notebook. Other names being monster notebook or musclebook in reference to muscle cars.) is a laptop computer that provides the full capabilities of a workstation-class desktop computer while remaining mobile. Because of its increased size, this class of computer usually includes more powerful components and a larger display than generally used in smaller portable computers and can have a relatively limited battery capacity (or none at all). Some use a limited range of desktop components (DToM) to provide better performance at the expense of battery life.

== Origins ==
The forerunners of the mobile workstation were the portable computers of the early to mid-1980s, such as the Portal R2E CCMC, the Osborne 1, Kaypro II, the Compaq Portable and the Commodore Executive 64 (SX-64) computers. These computers contained the CPU, display, floppy disk drive and power supply all in a single briefcase-like enclosure. Similar in performance to the desktop computers of the era, they were easily transported and came with an attached keyboard that doubled as a protective cover when not in use. They could be used wherever space and an electrical outlet were available, as they had no battery.

The development of the laptop form factor gave new impetus to portable computer development. Many early laptops were feature-limited in the interest of portability, requiring such mobility-limiting accessories as external floppy drives or clip-on trackball pointing devices. One of the first laptops that could be used as a standalone computer was the EUROCOM 2100 based on Intel's 8088 CPU architecture, it duplicated the functionality of the desktop models without requiring an external docking station.

The development of the modern mobile workstation came with the realization that many laptops were used in a semi-permanent location, often remaining connected to an external power source at all times. This suggested that a market existed for a laptop-style computer that would take advantage of the user's reduced need for portability, allowing for higher-performance components, greater expandability, and higher-quality displays. Mobile workstations are also often used with a port replicator, to full enjoy the desktop comfort.

== Design features ==
Modern mobile workstations generally perform better than traditional laptop-style computers as their size allows the inclusion of more powerful components. The larger body means more efficient heat-dissipation, allowing manufacturers to use components that would otherwise overheat during normal use. Furthermore, their increased size allows for more modularity, which allows for a greater expandability and features, as well as larger and brighter displays. However, these advantages generally come at a price premium, with many computers in this class costing as much as two desktop computers with similar specifications.

Using a laptop form factor, however, mobile workstations still often suffer from limitations similar to those of more mobile laptops. They usually lack the ability to accept standard PCIe expansion cards, somewhat limiting their expandability. While mobile workstations can offer better cooling than other laptops, they rarely dissipate heat efficiently enough to allow for high-end desktop-class components, and thus may not reach the same performance levels as desktop computers.

Mobile workstations computers are, with a few exceptions, difficult to upgrade compared to desktop computers, with many of their major components (such as the display) integral to the design of the machine, and others (such as the CPU and GPU) often being hard to access and replace. A small segment of mobile workstations do not include a battery as a standard feature, while some do not include ExpressCard support. They have the same limitations on serviceability as laptops, and can rarely use identical components to a desktop computer.

== See also ==
- Clevo x7200
- Overclocking
- SLI
- Enthusiast computing
- Gaming laptop
- Mobile on desktop (MoDT)
