= Eurocom Corporation =

Canadian producer of laptops

- Type: Private
- Industry: Computer hardware
- Founded: 1989
- Founder: Mark Bialic
- Headquarters: Ottawa, Canada
- Area served: Worldwide
- Number of employees: 20

Eurocom Corporation is a Canadian computer developer of high performance notebooks and laptops.

== History ==
Eurocom was founded in 1989 as a company designing desktop replacement notebooks. To achieve this they used CPUs intended for desktop computers in their notebooks. In May 2013 Eurocom began to sell laptops through Future Shop's online retail store.

== Background ==
Eurocom structures laptop design and building around units that it claims are "highly configurable and easily upgradable." Another Eurocom philosophy is "creating computers that push technology forward" and the company claims to have a series of industry firsts as a result. Eurocom offers a series of specialized computers such as Trusted Platform Module notebooks, and Mobile Servers. Eurocom has been awarded the "Intel Form Factor Solution Innovation Award" In addition to other awards from various publications.
