= Compaq LTE 5000 series =

Series of laptops by Compaq

LTE 5000 series

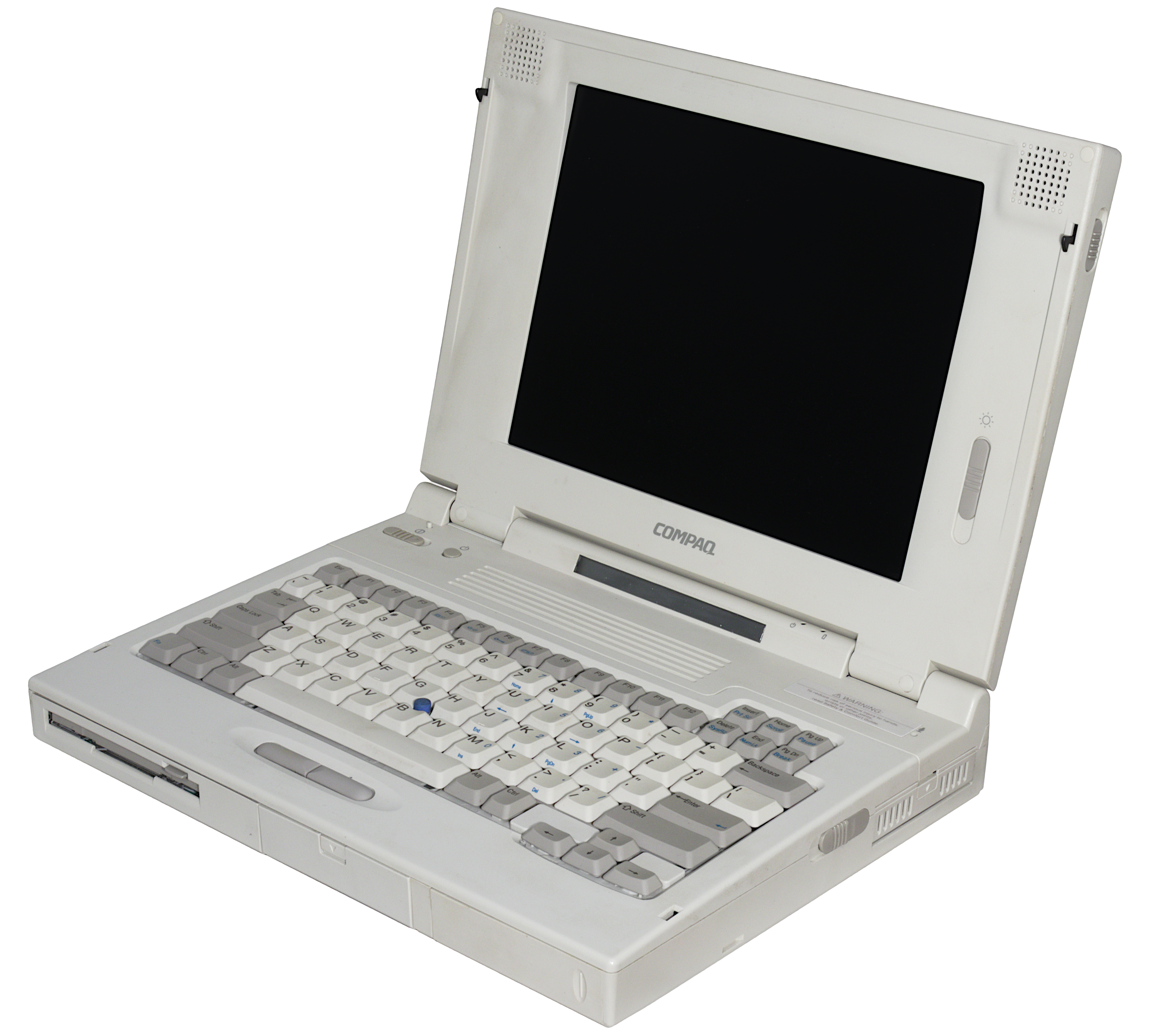
- Compaq LTE 5100
- Developer: Compaq; Inventec
- Manufacturer: Inventec
- Product family: LTE
- Type: Laptop (notebook)
- Generation: Fourth
- Released: September 28, 1995; 30 years ago
- Lifespan: 1995–1997
- Operating system: MS-DOS; Microsoft Windows
- CPU: Pentium
- Predecessor: LTE Elite
- Successor: Armada
- Website: compaq.com at the Wayback Machine (archived December 25, 1996)

The LTE 5000 series was a series of notebook-sized laptops under the LTE line manufactured by Compaq from 1995 to 1997. The LTE 5000 series was Compaq's first laptop with Pentium processors from Intel. The line of computers were co-developed between Compaq and Inventec of Taiwan and were manufactured entirely by Inventec overseas. The LTE 5000 series was the last generation in the LTE line, Compaq replacing it with the Armada line in 1997.

== Development and specifications ==
The LTE 5000 series was the fourth and final generation of LTE, a notebook family introduced six years earlier in 1989. The LTE 5000 series directly replaced Compaq's LTE Elite series that they had introduced in 1994. According to the press at the time, Compaq had poorly handled the rollout of the LTE Elite in 1994, discontinuing the production of its predecessor, the LTE Lite, months before they were ready to ship the LTE Elite to customers. Certain models of the LTE Elite line were fraught with technical issues, leading to several recalls. These factors and more contributed to a proportional shrinkage in Compaq's laptop market share, despite the company's total market share slightly increasing from 1993. No longer was Compaq the top laptop maker in the United States: Toshiba overtook them that year, helped along with their Satellite line of laptops.

As a result of this upset, in early 1995, Compaq hired Inventec of Taiwan to co-design and manufacture in full the follow-up LTE. The partnership not only hastened development of a successor but also gained Compaq access to Taiwan's more cutting-edge technologies in the field of mobile computer production. It was the first time in several years that Compaq relied on an outside company to design a portable computer of theirs and was the first machine Compaq had manufactured entirely in Taiwan. At the beginning of the LTE 5000 series' development, Compaq also scouted for new talent for its portable systems division while letting others go; for example, in January 1995, Compaq hired Jeff Greenberg away from Toshiba America Information Systems to be a product manager of theirs. Compaq's partnership with Inventec was not without its own issues, however, with Compaq engineer Greg Mora calling the process of communicating small but important refinements in design challenging on account of Compaq having no ownership of Inventec's factory.

The LTE 5000 series was a top-to-bottom redesign of the LTE line, with Compaq abandoning the ambitious internal AC adapter of the Elite line in favor of the familiar power brick. In its stead was what Compaq termed the MultiBay: a multipurpose, hot-swappable expansion slot in the front of the machine that allowed users to slot in a floppy drive, a CD-ROM drive (a first for the LTE line), a second hard drive for more disk storage, or a second battery for frequent travelers. Compaq also offered a full-feature docking station, the MultiBay Expansion Base, that added several other MultiBay units to the machine, on top of additional PC Cards and an Ethernet port. Compaq later augmented it in the form of the MultiBay-ISA Expansion Base, which added an Industry Standard Architecture (ISA) expansion slot.

The LTE 5000 series was the debut of Intel's multimedia-oriented Pentium processor in a Compaq laptop; as well, it was Compaq's first laptop with built-in 16-bit audio synthesis and playback (beyond the PC speaker); hardware acceleration for video; and an infrared port for communicating with PDAs. An optional MPEG decoder card also allowed the laptop to stream MPEG video in real-time as well as output video to television sets and projectors. Compaq used ESS Technology's Sound Blaster–compatible AudioDrive chips to handle audio and used OPTi's PCI-based Viper as the computer's video and general-purpose chipset. The LTE 5000 series abandoned the monitor-mounted trackballs of older models in favor of an implementation of IBM's keyboard-mounted pointing stick technology.

The polarizers of certain early-model LTE 5000 series machines with active-matrix LCDs were coated with a dark film intended to increase contrast when looked at straight-on while reducing visibility from far angles. This led to criticism from users who perceived the displays as overly dim, especially for an active-matrix display. Compaq replaced the backlight inverter of successor models with a higher-voltage unit in response to this criticism.

== Reception ==
The Houston Chronicle's Dwight Silverman, reviewing the LTE 5100, called the display's refresh rate snappy, the hard drive's seek times "lightning-fast", and the keyboard's feeling "typically nice" for a Compaq portable. He deemed the laptop "excellent [for] anyone who has to do presentations on the road", with its hardware-accelerated graphics chip streaming video files flawlessly. Silverman had reservations with the display's brightness and relative heft of the machine, at 8 pounds (3.6 kg). Overall, he deemed the LTE 5100 "an everything-but-the-kitchen-sink approach to computer design [that] virtually bludgeons the competition with a mass of features". Silverman had similar opinions about its successor the LTE 5300, although noting that the brightness of its display was noticeably improved and praising the increased size of its display.

PC/Computing's Marty Jerome, reviewing the LTE 5100, gave the machine four-and-a-half-stars out of five. Like Silverman, Dwight praised its video performance while also highlighting its built-in speakers as "surprisingly good" in terms of range and stereo separation. Also like Silverman, Dwight drew attention to the machine's heaviness, writing that it "harken[ed] back to the days of laptops and throbbing shoulders", but found the keyboard layout "excellent" and welcomed the addition of a wrist wrest. Jerome called the optional CD-ROM drive slow for the time, at only 2× speed.

PC World's Brad Grimes, reviewing the LTE 5100, deemed the machine "among the best" of the portables the magazine had tested up to that point and evaluated it as the fastest 90-MHz Pentium notebook on the market. However, he wrote that the over $6,000 price tag made it non-competitive. Melissa Riofrio of the same publication, reviewing a submodel of the LTE 5100 with half the included RAM (8 MB instead of 16 MB), found it slow compared to competitor offerings and still too expensive, at $5,400. Reviewing the LTE 5250, Grimes called its processor performant, the case and keyboard sturdy and comfortable, the speakers superb, and the battery lifelong but called the display too dim and too small. He found the LTE 5150 an adequate substitute, albeit with one with a lower-quality passive-matrix display.

Bruce Brown of PC Magazine, reviewing the LTE 5300, called it a "stalwart choice" for "a top-quality multimedia presentation portable" and "a good bet for corporate buyers" but found it expensive at over $6,600. In benchmark tests, Brown deemed the Compaq LTE an average performer in terms of number-crunching and graphical capability while singling out its battery life as "very good". Comparing the LTE 5300 to Dell's Latitude XPi P133ST, Michael Caton of PC Week called the Compaq a better desktop replacement due to its modularity and optional full-feature docking station but found Dell's unit an overall performer in terms of processing speed and graphics.

PC World's Rex Farrance, reviewing the LTE 5400 (the final model in the line), wrote that, while expensive, the machine possessed "above-average reliability, super service, flawless construction, and a lovely screen". Its 150-MHz processor was deemed only slightly above average in terms of performance, while its battery life and hard drive storage space were deemed mediocre.

== Legacy ==
Compaq began retiring the LTE line with the 5000 series after introducing the Armada line in 1996. The final LTE 5000 models rolled off the line in the middle of June 1997. The Armada series marked the return of Compaq manufacturing their own laptops; following the end of the LTE 5000 series, Compaq severed ties with Inventec.

In 2016, Jalopnik reported that the Compaq LTE 5280, released in 1996, was still used by McLaren Automotive to service the McLaren F1 supercar—the current record holder (as of 2022) for the fastest production car with a naturally aspirated engine. McLaren built 106 F1s, of which 100 were remaining in 2016. McLaren designed the on-board diagnostics (OBD) designed around the use of the Compaq LTE line as the scan tool. Their mechanics use software installed on the LTE 5280 as their means to service the car, with a bespoke conditional access (CA) card built into the LTE 5280 both to prevent third-party access to the cars' OBD and to copy-protect the scan tool software. A software-based, platform-agnostic emulator for the CA card was developed a few years later, although McLaren maintains a hoarde of LTE 5280s as spares.

== Models ==
Compaq LTE 5000 series lineup
Model	Release date	Processor	Clock speed (MHz)	LCD technology	LCD size (in.)	LCD resolution	Stock memory (max., in MB)	HDD	CD-ROM drive
LTE 5000 Model 510 CSTN	September 1995	Intel Pentium	75	Passive-matrix color	10.4	640×480	8 or 16 (72)	510 MB	Optional
LTE 5000 Model 810 CSTN	September 1995	Intel Pentium	75	Passive-matrix color	11.3	800×600	8 or 16 (72)	810 MB	Optional
LTE 5000 Model 810 CTFT	September 1995	Intel Pentium	75	Active-matrix color	10.4	640×480	8 or 16 (72)	810 MB	Optional
LTE 5100 Model 810 CTFT	September 1995	Intel Pentium	90	Active-matrix color	10.4	800×600	8 or 16 (72)	810 MB	Optional
LTE 5100 Model 810 CD CTFT	September 1995	Intel Pentium	90	Active-matrix color	10.4	800×600	8 or 16 (72)	810 MB	Included
LTE 5150 Model 810 CSTN 800×600	June 1996	Intel Pentium	100	Passive-matrix color	11.3	800×600	8 or 16 (72)	810 MB	Included
LTE 5200 Model 1350 CTFT	September 1995	Intel Pentium	120	Active-matrix color	10.4	800×600	8 or 16 (72)	1.35 GB	Optional
LTE 5250 Model 810 CTFT 800×600	June 1996	Intel Pentium	120	Active-matrix color	10.4	800×600	8 or 16 (80)	810 MB	Included
LTE 5280 Model 810 CTFT 800×600	April 1996	Intel Pentium	120	Active-matrix color	11.3	800×600	8 or 16 (80)	810 MB	Included
LTE 5280 Model 1350 CTFT 800×600	April 1996	Intel Pentium	120	Active-matrix color	11.3	800×600	8 or 16 (80)	1.35 GB	Included
LTE 5300 Model 1350 CTFT 800×600	April 1996	Intel Pentium	133	Active-matrix color	12.1	800×600	8 or 16 (80)	1.35 GB	Included
LTE 5300 Model 2160 CTFT 800×600	April 1996	Intel Pentium	133	Active-matrix color	12.1	800×600	8 or 16 (80)	2.16 GB	Included
LTE 5380 Model 2160 CTFT 1024×768	November 1996	Intel Pentium	133	Active-matrix color	12.1	1024×768	8 or 16 (80)	2.16 GB	Included
LTE 5400 Model 2160 CTFT 800×600	November 1996	Intel Pentium	150	Active-matrix color	12.1	800×600	8 or 16 (80)	2.16 GB	Included
