= Electrostatic solitary wave =

Electromagnetic phenomenon

In space physics, an electrostatic solitary wave (ESW) is a type of electromagnetic soliton occurring during short time scales (when compared to the general time scales of variations in the average electric field) in plasma. When a rapid change occurs in the electric field in a direction parallel to the orientation of the magnetic field, and this perturbation is caused by a unipolar or dipolar electric potential, it is classified as an ESW.

Since the creation of ESWs is largely associated with turbulent fluid interactions, some experiments use them to compare how chaotic a measured plasma's mixing is. As such, many studies which involve ESWs are centered around turbulence, chaos, instabilities, and magnetic reconnection.

== History ==
The discovery of solitary waves in general is attributed to John Scott Russell in 1834, with their first mathematical conceptualization being finalized in 1871 by Joseph Boussinesq (and later refined and popularized by Lord Rayleigh in 1876). However, these observations and solutions were for oscillations of a physical medium (usually water), and not describing the behavior of non-particle waves (including electromagnetic waves). For solitary waves outside of media, which ESWs are classified as^{a}, the first major framework was likely developed by Louis de Broglie in 1927, though his work on the subject was temporarily abandoned and was not completed until the 1950s.

Electrostatic structures were first observed near Earth's polar cusp by Donald Gurnett and Louis A. Frank using data from the Hawkeye 1 satellite in 1978. However, it is Michael Temerin, William Lotko, Forrest Mozer, and Keith Cerny^{b} who are credited with the first observation of electrostatic solitary waves in Earth's magnetosphere in 1982. Since then, a wide variety of magnetospheric satellites have observed and documented ESWs, allowing for analysis of them and the surrounding plasma conditions.

== Detection ==
Electrostatic solitary waves, by their nature, are a phenomenon occurring in the electric field of a plasma. As such, ESWs are technically detectable by any instrument that can measure changes to the electric field during a sufficiently short time window. However, since a given plasma's electric field can vary widely depending on the properties of the plasma and since ESWs occur in short time windows, detection of ESWs can require additional screening of the data in addition to the measurement of the electric field itself. One solution to this obstacle for detecting ESWs, implemented by NASA's Magnetospheric Multiscale Mission (MMS), is to use a digital signal processor to analyze the electric field data and isolate short-duration spikes as a candidate for an ESW. Though the following detection algorithm is specific to MMS, other ESW-detecting algorithms function on similar principles.

To detect an ESW, the data from a device measuring the electric field is sent to the digital signal processor. This data is analyzed across a short time window (in the case of MMS, 1 millisecond), taking both the average electric field magnitude and the largest electric field magnitude during that time window. If the peak field strength exceeds some multiple of the average field strength (4 times the field strength in MMS), then the time window is considered to contain an ESW. After this occurs, the ESW can be associated with the peak electric field strength and categorized accordingly. These algorithms vary in success at detection, since both the time window and detection multiplier are chosen by scientists based on the parameters they wish to detect. As such, these algorithms often have false positives and false negatives.

== Interactions ==
One of the primary physical consequences of ESWs is their creation of electron phase-space holes, a type of structure which prevents low velocity electrons from remaining close to the source of the ESW. These phase-space holes, like the ESWs themselves, can travel stably through the surrounding plasma. Since most plasmas are overall electrically neutral, these phase-space holes often end up behaving as a positive pseudoparticle.

In general, in order to form an electron phase-space hole, the electric potential energy associated with the ESW's potential needs to exceed the kinetic energy of electrons in the plasma (behavior analogous to potential hills). Research has shown that one possible set of situations where this occurs naturally are kinetic instabilities. One observed example of this is the increased occurrence of these holes near Earth's bow shock and magnetopause, where the incoming solar wind collides with Earth's magnetosphere to produce large amounts of turbulence in the plasma.

== Forms ==
The definition of an ESW is broad enough that, on occasion, research distinguishes between different types:

- Ion-acoustic solitary waves: A type of ESW that occurs when the electric potential that causes the ESW produces an ion acoustic wave.
- Electron-acoustic solitary waves: A type of ESW that produces an acoustic wave associated with electrons. These tend to be substantially faster and higher frequency than ion-acoustic solitary waves.
- Supersolitary waves: A type of ESW whose electric potential include pulses on even smaller time scales than the ESW itself.

== See also ==
- Soliton
- Interplanetary magnetic field
- Solar wind
- Electric potential
- Turbulence
- Time domain electromagnetics

== Notes ==
a.An ESW itself is strictly an electromagnetic phenomenon, and as such is technically non-dependent on media. However, this technicality should be observed with caution. Nearly all conditions that give rise to an ESW are theorized to be dependent on the plasma medium they reside in.
b.Though the identity of the other 3 co-authors is known for certain, the career of K. Cerny after the publishing of their paper is poorly documented. The first name, date, school, and major associated with graduation heavily suggest that Keith Cerny is the K. Cerny credited on the paper, but this is (as-of-yet) unconfirmed.
