= Cynthia Cattell =

Space physicist

Cynthia A. Cattell
- Education: University of California, Berkeley
- Scientific career
- Thesis: Magnetic field-aligned currents in the earth's magnetosphere (1980)
- Doctoral advisor: Forrest S. Mozer

Cynthia Cattell is a space plasma physicist known for her research on solar flares and radiation belts.

== Education and career ==
Cattell has a B.A. from Hampshire College (1974) and earned her Ph.D. from the University of California, Berkeley in 1980.

As of 2021, Cattell is a professor in the School of Physics and Astronomy at the University of Minnesota.

== Research ==
Cattell's research on electron holes in space helps explain the release of energy from magnetic explosions in space. Cattell has also examined the energization of electrons in Earth's radiation belt and used satellite data to examine the behavior of ions flowing around Earth. Cattell uses her scientific knowledge to present the public with viewing opportunities to see the Northern Lights.

=== Selected publications ===
- Cattell, C. (2005). "Cluster observations of electron holes in association with magnetotail reconnection and comparison to simulations". Journal of Geophysical Research. 110 (A1): A01211. Bibcode:2005JGRA..110.1211C. doi:10.1029/2004JA010519. hdl:11603/30666.
- Cattell, C.; Wygant, J. R.; Goetz, K.; Kersten, K.; Kellogg, P. J.; von Rosenvinge, T.; Bale, S. D.; Roth, I.; Temerin, M.; Hudson, M. K.; Mewaldt, R. A.; Wiedenbeck, M.; Maksimovic, M.; Ergun, R.; Acuna, M.; Russell, C. T. (12 January 2008). "Discovery of very large amplitude whistler-mode waves in Earth's radiation belts" (PDF). Geophysical Research Letters. 35 (1): L01105. Bibcode:2008GeoRL..35.1105C. doi:10.1029/2007GL032009. S2CID 120148399.
- Cattell, C.; Dombeck, J.; Hanson, L. (7 September 2013). "Simultaneous ground and satellite observations of discrete auroral arcs, substorm aurora, and Alfvénic aurora with FAST and THEMIS GBO". Journal of Geophysical Research: Space Physics. 118 (9): 5673–5680. doi:10.1002/jgra.50546. S2CID 120148399.
- Colpitts, C.A.; Hakimi, S.; Cattell, C.A.; Dombeck, J.; Maas, M. (29 October 2013). "Simultaneous ground and satellite observations of discrete auroral arcs, substorm aurora, and Alfvénic aurora with FAST and THEMIS GBO". Journal of Geophysical Research: Space Physics. 118 (11): 6998–7010. Bibcode:2013JGRA..118.6998C. doi:10.1002/2013JA018796. S2CID 120148399.

== Awards and honors ==
- National Academy of Sciences/Committee on Solar Terrestrial Research, 1993-1995
- NASA Sun-Earth-Connection Advisory Subcommittee, 1998-2001
- Chair, NASA Plasma Sail Assessment Working Group, 2003
- National Academy of Sciences/Plasma Sciences Committee, 2001-2005
- NASA SSSC Roadmap Committee, 2004-2005
- Member, Advisory Committee to UCLA Basic Plasma Science Facility, 2004-2007
- National Academy of Sciences/Committee on Science Opportunities Enables by NASA's Constellation System, 2008
- Fellow, American Geophysical Union (2008)
- Fellow, American Physical Society (2010)
- George W. Taylor for Distinguished Service (2011) from the University of Minnesota
- CSE Distinguished Professor (2020)
- Mullen-Spector-Traux Women's Leadership Award (2014)
- Cottrell Scholar (1997)

== Personal life ==
In 2012, Cattell was diagnosed with cancer and was treated with an experimental drug developed by colleagues at University of Minnesota's Masonic Cancer Center. After receiving an increased dosage of an experimental drug there was a reduction in Cattell's tumor and her lymphoma was considered in remission.
