= Sensory, Inc. =

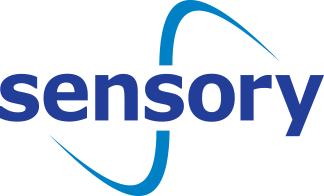
- Industry: Speech recognition; Artificial intelligence; Biometrics
- Founded: 1994
- Headquarters: Santa Clara, California, U.S.

Sensory, Inc. is an American company which develops software AI technologies for speech, sound and vision. It is based in Santa Clara, California.

== History ==
Sensory, Inc. was founded in 1994, originally as Sensory Circuits, by Forrest Mozer, Mike Mozer and Todd Mozer. The three had also co-founded ESS Technology years earlier. In 1999 Sensory acquired Fluent Speech Technologies, which was formed and started by a group of professors out of the Oregon Graduate Institute (formerly OGI, now OHSU). Fluent Speech Technologies developed high performance embedded speech engines, the technology from this acquisition is now the core technology used throughout Sensory's chip and software line.

== Technology and products ==
Sensory originally developed both hardware (Integrated Circuit - IC or "chip") and software platforms but migrated to software only around 2005 and added cloud and hybrid computing capabilities in 2021. Sensory's RSC-164 IC (Integrated Circuit or "chip") was used on NASA's Mars Polar Lander in the Mars Microphone on the Lander. Speech Synthesis SC-6x chips – acquired some speech synthesis technology from Texas Instruments.
