= ESS Technology =

Former synthetic speech synthesizer company that is now known for its Sabre DAC chips

ESS Technology, Inc.
- Formerly: Electronic Speech Systems
- Type: Private
- Founded: 1984
- Headquarters: San Jose, California
- Key people: Dr. Saied Tehrani (president and CEO); John Marsh (CFO)
- Products: DACs and ADCs for audio applications, multimedia
- Website: www.esstech.com

ESS Technology Incorporated is a private manufacturer of computer multimedia products, Audio DACs and ADCs based in Fremont, California, with R&D centers in Kelowna, British Columbia, Canada and Beijing, China. It was founded by Forrest Mozer in 1983 as Electronic Speech Systems. Robert L. Blair is the CEO and President of the company.

Historically, ESS Technology was most famous for its speech synthesis technology developed by Mozer as well as its line of sound chips for audio cards such as the AudioDrive series. Currently, it is known for the SABRE line of DAC and ADC products used in several audio and mobile devices.

== History ==
ESS Technologies was founded in 1983 as Electronic Speech Systems, by Professor Forrest Mozer, a space physicist at the University of California, Berkeley and Todd Mozer, Forrest Mozer's son, and Joe Costello, the former manager of National Semiconductor's Digitalker line of talking chips. The company was created at least partially as a way to market Mozer's speech synthesis system (described in US patents 4,214,125, 4,433,434 and 4,435,831) after his (3-year, summer 1978 to summer 1981, extended) contract with National Semiconductor expired sometime in 1983. Costello left soon after its formation and started Cadence Designs with his former boss from National. Fred Chan, a VLSI designer and software engineer in Berkeley, California, joined in 1985, and took over running the company in 1986 when Todd Mozer left for graduate school.

Electronic Speech Systems produced synthetic speech for, among other things, home computer systems like the Commodore 64. Within the hardware limitations of that time, ESS used Mozer's technology, in software, to produce realistic-sounding voices that often became the boilerplate for the respective games. Two popular sound bites from the Commodore 64 were "He slimed me!!" from Ghostbusters and Elvin Atombender's "Another visitor. Stay a while—stay forever!" in the original Impossible Mission.

At some point, the company moved from Berkeley to Fremont, California. Around that time, the company was renamed to ESS Technology. Later, in 1994, Forrest Mozer's son Todd Mozer, an ESS employee, branched off and started his own company called Sensory Circuits Inc. (later Sensory, Inc.) to market speech recognition technology.

In the mid-1990s, ESS started working on making PC audio, and later, video chips. It created the AudioDrive line of sound chips, used in hundreds of different products. AudioDrive chips were at least nominally compatible with the Creative Sound Blaster Pro (and by extension, the AdLib). Many AudioDrive chips starting with the ES1688 also featured an in-house developed version of the OPL3 FM synthesis chip known as ESFM (also termed "ESFM synthesizers"); these chips were often reasonably faithful to the OPL3 in Legacy mode (with some minor differences in sound generation), which was an important feature for the time as some competing solutions, including Creative's own CQM synthesis used in later ISA Sound Blaster cards, offered sub-par FM sound quality. ESFM also offers additional features in its exclusive Native mode such as a flexible 4 operator sound system with per-operator frequency control and LFO depth for all sound channels, allowing for more complex tones to be generated than its contemporary OPL2/3 chips. Some PCI-based AudioDrives (namely the ES1938 Solo-1) also provided legacy DOS compatibility through Distributed DMA and the SB-Link interface. The PCI-based Allegro and Maestro line of sound chips on the other hand uses a software-emulated version of the OPL3 that lacks the additional features of the ESFM found in many AudioDrive chips.

In 1996, ESS acquired VideoCore Technology, Inc., and Osee Technologies, Inc.

In 2001 ESS acquired a small Kelowna design company (SAS) run by Martin Mallinson and continues R&D operations in Kelowna. The Kelowna R&D Center then developed the SABRE range of DAC and ADC products that are used in many audio systems and cell phones.

== Present day ==
As of today, ESS is known for its SABRE line of DACs and ADCs. The ESS SABRE ES9038P is its flagship and competes against the Japanese-based AKM (Asahi Kasei Microdevices) AK4499EXEQ and American-based Cirrus Logic CS43131 for a share of the market. ESS and AKM dominate the desktop audiophile devices including external DACs and integrated all-in-one DAC/Amp devices, while Cirrus Logic dominates the portable device market with Apple Inc. being the number one customer accounting for approximately 89% of its chip sales in 2025.

More recently, ESS SABRE DACs are used in the LG V10 smartphone, with a quad DAC configuration present in the V10's successor LG V20. A slightly upgraded version of the same DAC in the V20, the SABRE ES9218P, is used in the V30 as well as the V40 ThinQ. The luxury Sennheiser HE 1 electrostatic headphone utilizes 8 internal DACs of the SABRE ES9018.

ESS SABRE DACs have also been used on several PCIe-based Sound Blaster cards since 2017, including the Sound BlasterX AE-5 and AE-5 Plus and the Sound Blaster AE-7 and AE-9. The AE-5 and AE-5 Plus were both equipped with SABRE ES9016K2M DACs while the AE-7 and AE-9 came with SABRE ES9018 and ES9038 DACs respectively (the latter being one of the flagship products of ESS in the present day).

== Staff ==
Forrest Mozer continues his research work at the University of California as Associate Director of Space Sciences. He was awarded EGU Hannes Alfven Medallist 2004 for his work in electrical field measurement and space plasma and also was involved in building the microphone to record sounds from the Mars Lander. He is a member of the board of directors of Sensory, Inc.

Fred Chan held a number of positions at ESS, and was CEO of Vialta, an internet offshoot of ESS, before stepping down from his position on July 18, 2007, to pursue philanthropic interests.

== Games featuring ESS-speech ==
- Fisher Price Jungle Book Reading (Apple II, 19??)
- Impossible Mission (C64, 1984)
- Ghostbusters (C64, 1984)
- Cave of the Word Wizard (C64, 1984)
- Talking Teacher (C64, 1985)
- Kennedy Approach (C64, 1985)
- Desert Fox (C64, 1985)
- Beach Head II (C64, 1985)
- 221b Baker Street (C64, 1986)
- Solo Flight (C64, 1986)
- Big Bird's Hide and Speak (NES, 1990)
- Mickey's Jigsaw Puzzles (DOS, 1991)

== Products ==
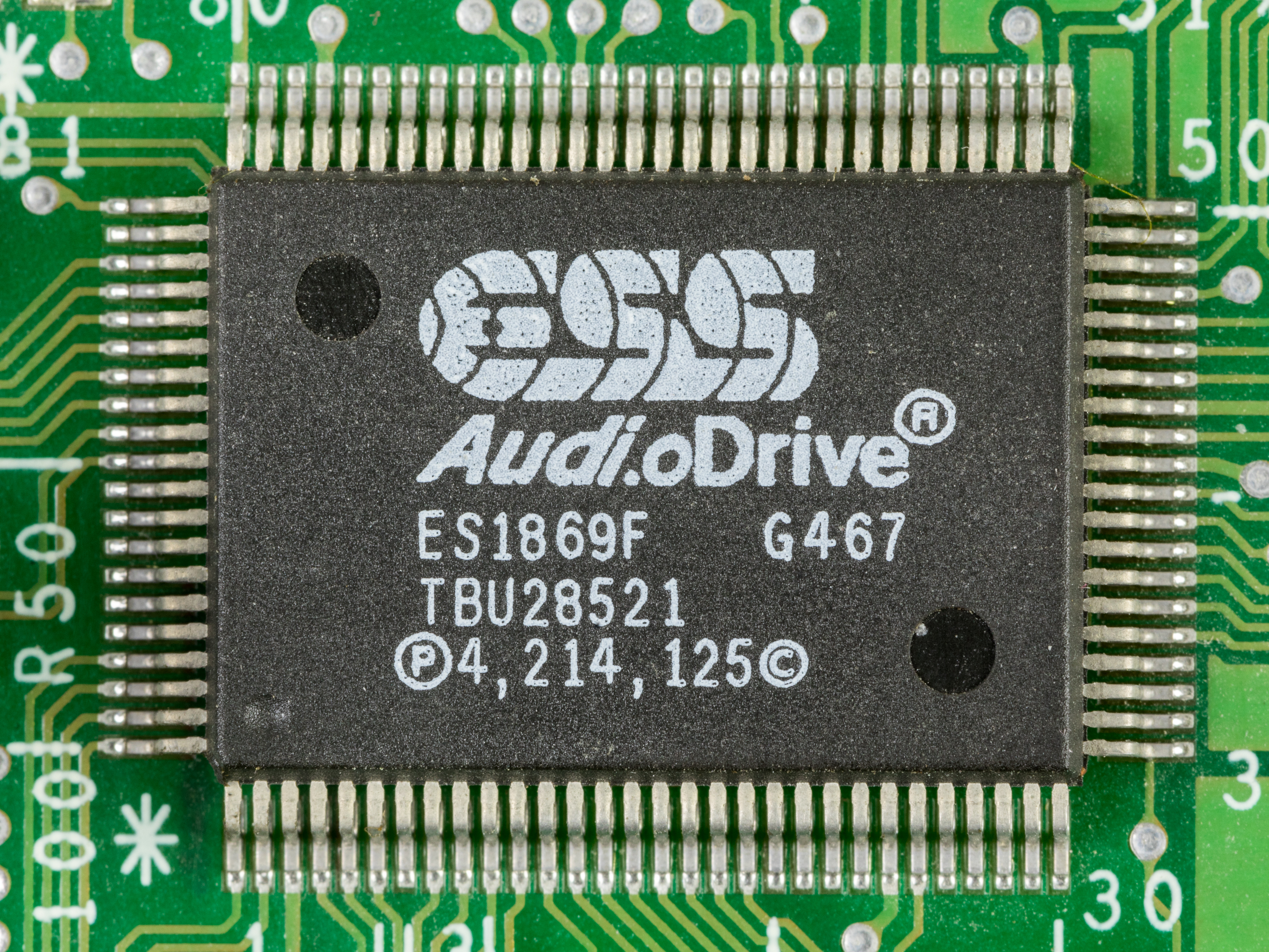
ES1869F AudioDrive sound chip

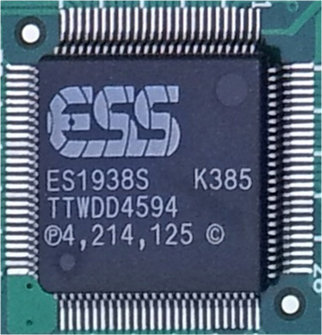
ES1938 sound chip

- ES688F AudioDrive
- ES1488F AudioDrive
- ES1688F AudioDrive
- ES1698 AudioDrive
- ES1788 AudioDrive
- ES1868 AudioDrive
- ES1869F/ES1869S AudioDrive
- ES1878 AudioDrive
- ES1879 AudioDrive
- ES1887/ES1888 AudioDrive
- ES1898 AudioDrive
- ES1938 Solo-1
- ES1946 Solo 1E
- ES1948 Maestro-1
- ES1968 Maestro-2
- ES1978 Maestro-2E
- ES1983 Maestro-3i
- ES1988/ES1989 Allegro
- ES9016K2M SABRE 32-bit/384 kHz DAC
- ES9018 SABRE DAC
- ES9038/ES9038P SABRE DAC
- ES9218P SABRE high fidelity system-on-chip; 32-bit stereo mobile digital-to-analog converter with 2 Volt headphone amplifier.

== See also ==
- Covox Speech Thing
