= Calgary Opera =

Canadian opera company

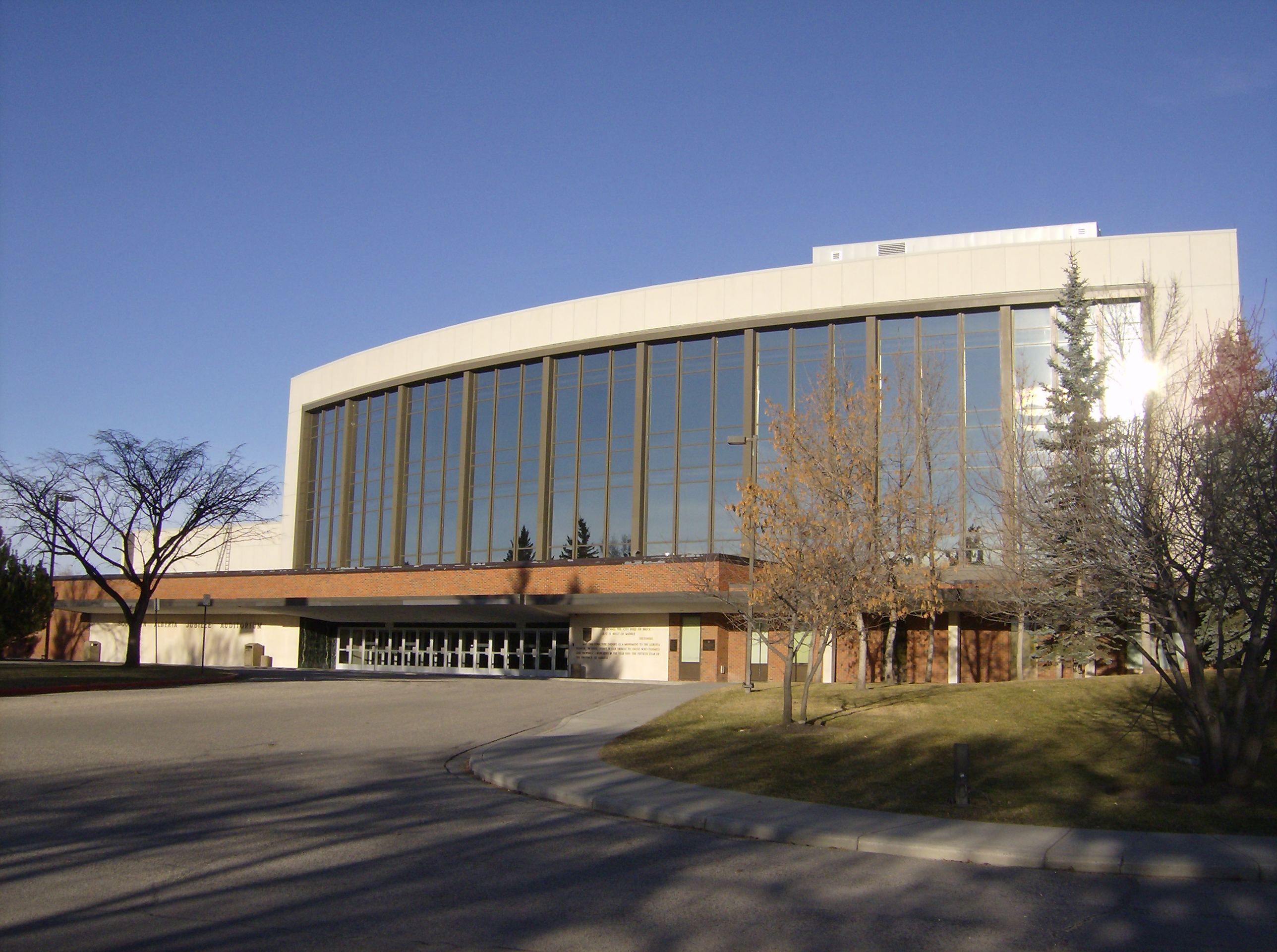
Southern Alberta Jubilee Auditorium in Calgary, Alberta, Canada.

Calgary Opera is a Canadian opera company based in Calgary, Alberta. The company has its administrative base at the Mamdani Opera Centre, a 2,700-square-metre (29,000-square-foot) facility in the Wesley United Church, since July 2005. The company gives its seasonal mainstage productions at the Southern Alberta Jubilee Auditorium. During the summers of 2014–2017, the company presented Opera in the Village, the only Canadian outdoor summer opera festival.

== History ==
The company was founded in 1972 as the Southern Alberta Opera Association. The association initially performed two opera productions per year, from 1973 to 1977. Alexander Gray was the first artistic director of the Southern Alberta Opera Association, and held the post until 1976. In 1976, the association appointed Brian Hanson as both its general manager and artistic director. During Hanson's tenure, the association expanded its season to three productions per season, beginning in 1978. Hanson described his general philosophy of programming operas for the company as "something old, something new, something light".

In 1983, the Southern Alberta Opera Association officially changed its name to the Calgary Opera. The company presented further expanded seasons of four productions in 1983, 1985, 1986, and 1988. Hanson retired from his posts in 1988. David Speers, previously the assistant general manager of the company, succeeded Hanson in 1988. The company staged five operas in 1990, and four operas in 1991. Speers concluded his tenure in 1998.

In 1998, W.R. ("Bob") McPhee became general director of Calgary Opera. The company staged four productions in 2001, 2002, and 2004. From July 2004 to September 2005, the Southern Alberta Jubilee Auditorium was shuttered for renovations. The company established its Emerging Artist Development Program in 2004, and received support of $375K (CDN) from the Canada Arts Training Fund over the period from 2010 to 2013. The Opera in the Village programme began during McPhee's tenure. In March 2015, the company announced a partnership with the Calgary Stampede that is to lead to the eventual construction of a new opera centre for the company, on land provided by the Calgary Stampede. McPhee retired as the company's general director on 3 March 2017, because of health issues. Taras Kulish and Lauren Martin subsequently served as interim leaders of the company. In December 2017, the company announced the appointment of Keith Cerny as its next general director, effective January 2018. In August 2018, the company announced Cerny's departure as its general director, as of January 2019.

Gordon Gerrard was the company's resident conductor and répétiteur for four seasons, beginning in 2009. Christopher ("Topher") Mokrzewski succeeded Gerrard as resident conductor and repetiteur with the company in 2013. In October 2017, the company announced the appointment of Kimberley-Ann Bartczak as its next resident conductor and repetiteur. Bartczak was the first female conductor to be named to this post.

Bramwell Tovey was artistic director of the company from January 2019 to October 2020. Heather Kitchen was the General Director and CEO of the company from January 2019 to the end of 2023. In September 2021, the company announced the appointment of Jonathan Brandani as its new artistic director. Sue Elliott is Calgary Opera's current General Director and CEO, effective 20 November 2023.

== New work ==
Calgary Opera has commissioned and/or presented several new operas by Canadian composers, including the following:

- Allan Gordon Bell and Rick McNair: Turtle Wakes (2001; one-act opera for young audiences)
- John Estacio and John Murrell: Filumena (2003)
- John Estacio and John Murrell: Frobisher (2007)
- Allan Gilliland and Val Brandt: Hannaraptor (2008; one-act opera for young audiences)
- Bramwell Tovey and John Murrell: The Inventor (2011)
- Arthur Bachmann and Clem Martini: What Brought Us Here (2012)

Calgary Opera was also a co-commissioner of Jake Heggie and Gene Scheer's 2012 opera Moby-Dick, along with the Dallas Opera, the San Francisco Opera, the San Diego Opera, and the State Opera of South Australia.
