= Compaq Armada =

Discontinued line of business laptops

- Developer: Compaq
- Type: Laptop
- Released: 1996-2001
- Predecessor: Compaq Contura (as low-end); Compaq LTE (as hi-end)
- Successor: Compaq Evo
- Related: ProSignia laptops

Armada is a discontinued line of business laptops by Compaq. They started as a more affordable version of the Contura line, but after that, they replaced Contura as a mainstream laptop line, and then the high-end Compaq LTE line were merged with Armada as a premium 7300 and 7700 sub-lines.

== Overview ==
=== History ===
The 3 generations can be classified:

- First gen with gray 1100 low-end lines, grey 4100/4200 midrange lines and white 7300 and 7700 high-end lines with Pentium I (or Pentium MMX) CPU's.
- Second gen — the design unification: new 1500/1700 and 3500 models, and redesign of previous generation high-end lines (7400 and 7800 laptops) — all-gray design and wave in a palmrest (if they exist); except early models of 1500 line, all new models have a Pentium II CPU in a base.

- Mid-gen 6500 laptop — first high-end model without a PointStick; the design was similar to the latest DEC laptops, as DEC was acquired in June 1998 by Compaq.

- Third gen — E, M and V series with all-flat design, similar to 6500 model, with dark gray case and blue touchpad (or pointstick) buttons.

The last models (100s/110) is a transitive generation between the Armada and Evo lines.

model lines
	case type	screen options	1996	1997	1998	1999	2000	2001
Portable	13"	12.1"-13.3"				3500		
Portable	11"	11.3"	Contura Aero				M300	
Powerful	15"	14.1-15.1"					E700	
Powerful	14"	14.1"				6500	M700	
Powerful	14"	13.3"-14.1"			7800			
Powerful	14"	13.3"-14.1"		77##	77##	7400		
Powerful	13"	12.1"		73#0	73#0			
Powerful	13"	12.1"		LTE 5400				
Powerful	13"	10.4"-12.1"	LTE 5000/5100/ 5200/5300					
Mainstream	15"	12.1-15.1"					E500	
Mainstream	15"	12.1-14.1"					E500s	
Mainstream	12"	12.1"		42#0	42#0			
Mainstream	12"	11.3"-12.1"	4110	41##				
Entry	14"	14.1"						110
Entry	14"	12.1-14.1"			17#0	17#0	V300	
Entry	13"	12.1-13.3"					100s	
Entry	13"	11.3-12.1"		15##	15##	1500		
Entry	11"	10.4"	1110 (Contura 4#0)	11#0				
italic - predecessor lines.

=== Design ===
Armada is a line of classic business laptops, with hot-swappable bays (include the easy-removable MultiBay CD/DVD-drive), magnesium alloys (except some models), and have a dual battery and docking stations as common option. Some models have a small lifting feet; some models could be ordered with internal power supply, and most of the Armada laptops have a screen latches (except 1100 line).

== Armada 1100, 4100 and 4200 series ==
1996-1997 lines. These have a trackball (or touchpad option for 4100/4200 series), instead of high-end LTE 5#00 line with pointing stick. Like other Pentium I laptops, soldered RAM placed in the same replaceable board with CPU and can be easily upgraded.

Early-released base models (mid-1996) is a 1110, 1120 and 4110.

The Armada 1100 offers a mainstream feature set in order to provide a compelling price-performance equation for the target market. It is meant to give customers all they need to run standard business applications such as word processing, spreadsheets, presentations, mail, etc... For customers that desire multi-media features, Compaq offers the LTE 5000 and the new Armada 4100 family of notebook computers. Third party external CD solutions are also available.

=== Armada 1100 series ===
An affordable version of the Contura 420 & 430C(X) models with same case and base specs which started at less than $2,000. The Armada version has a larger HDD and better CPU, but less warranty and no docking port. They only have a FDD, 8 or 16 MB base RAM and one EDO SODIMM RAM slot (that limited upgradeability up to 24 or 32 MB), and a NiMH battery with up to ~2–3 hours of runtime. This is the last Compaq notebook without a sound card. T models have a TFT display, just like the Contura CX models.

290 x 260 x 38 mm; ~2.3 kg. 10.4" screen (passive for base model, active for T).

Armada 1110 − Pentium (75); CSTN 640x480 screen.

Armada 1120(T) − Pentium (100), CSTN/TN 640x480 screen.

Armada 1130(T) − Pentium (120/133), CSTN/TN 800x600 screen, 16MB RAM soldered. Cirrus Logic GD7548.

=== Armada 4100 and 4200 series ===
Mainstream lines; 2 RAM slots, CD drive option, gray plastic case with internal magnesium alloy and with speakers in palmrest. Cirrus Logic graphic. Support for up to 3 batteries with promised 12 hours of working (Li-ion batteries also as option); the transportation handle with additional battery inside of them is one of these options.

Supports full-size dock option (Convenience Base) and smallest 4100 series docking base.

302 x 226 x 57 mm (38 mm Slimline); ~2.8 kg (4.13 kg with Dock station). Up to 12.1" screen.

4100 model differences
Model	Released	CPU	RAM (soldered/max)	Screen
4100	1996	Pentium (75)	8/40	
4110	1996	Pentium (100)	8/40	
4120	1997	Pentium (120)	16/48	11.3" CSTN 800x600
4120T	1997	Pentium (120)	8/40	11.8" TN 800x600
4125D	1997	Pentium (120)	8/40	11.3" CSTN 800x600
4125T	1997	Pentium (120)	16/48	11.8" TN 800x600
4130T	1997	Pentium (133)	16/48	11.8" TN 800x600
4131T	1997	Pentium (133)	16/48	12.1" TN 800x600
4135T	1997	Pentium (133)	16/48	11.8" TN 800x600
4150	1997	Pentium MMX (150)	16/80	12.1" CSTN 800x600
4150T	1997	Pentium MMX (150)	16/80	12.1" TN 800x600
4160T	1997	Pentium MMX (166)	16/80	12.1" TN 800x600
4160T slim		Pentium MMX (166)	16/80	12.1" TN 800x600

4200 series significant differences: Cardbus slot; non-upgradable CPU; 430TX chipset, C&T 65555 video. 2.4+ kg. Non-compatible with 4100 series 4 GB HDD option; 32 MB of soldered RAM and limit is 96 MB.

- Armada 4200T − Pentium MMX (233); 12.1" (800x600).

- Armada 4210T − Same as 4200T, instead hard drive.

- Armada 4220T − Pentium MMX (266).

== Armada 7300 and 7700 series ==
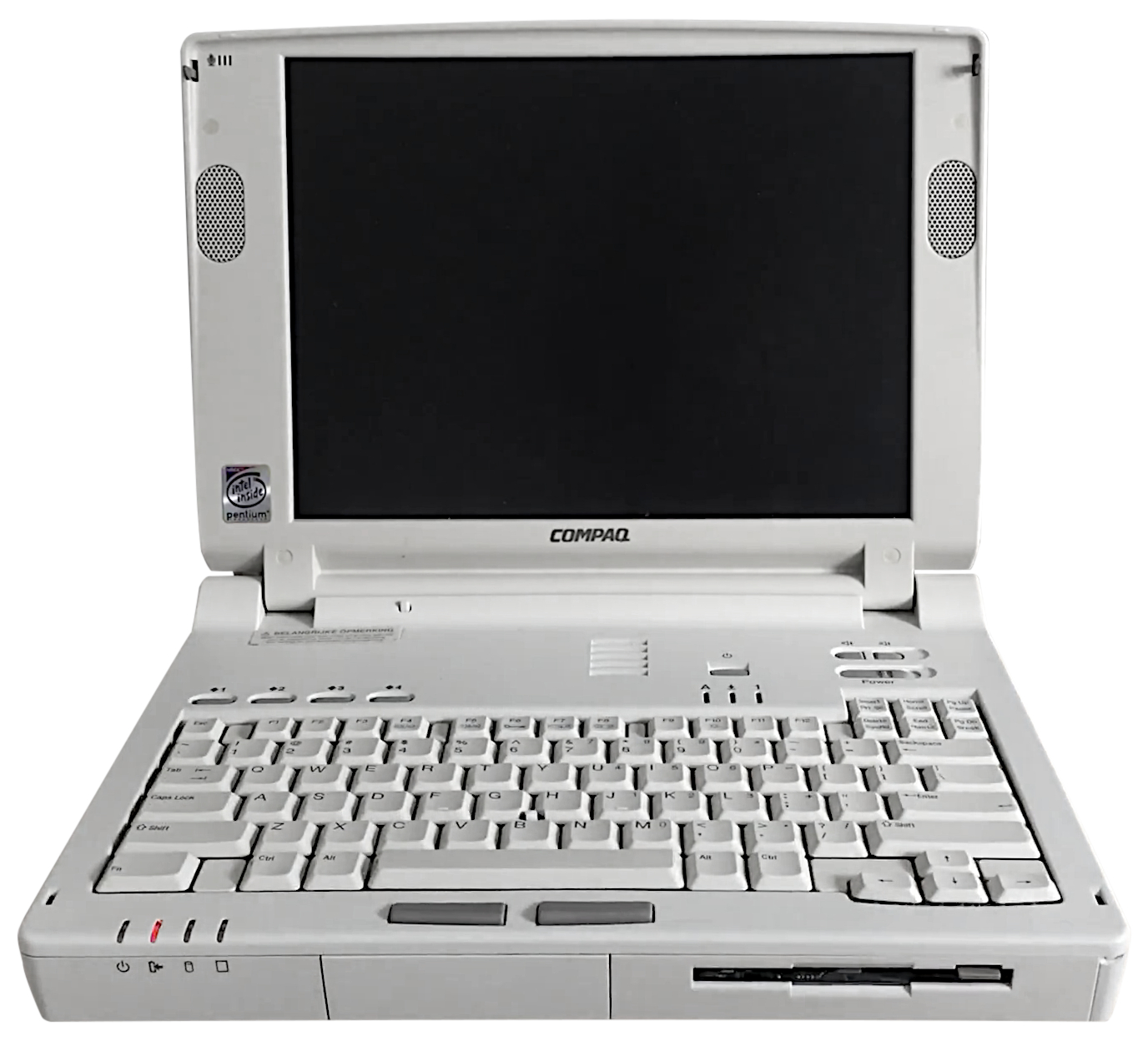
Armada 7710MT

High-end models with conservative white cases and with similar to last gen LTE laptops design. Only Pointstick is a pointing option. Both of them have a lifting feet, multiple bay option (include MultiBay) and both of them support a same docking stations (ArmadaStation, Armada MiniStation (E and EX).). The successors with similar cases is a 7400 and 7800 models (with different case color and with facelifted palmrest).

=== Armada 7300 series ===
Slightly more affordable and compact version of 7700 line. New white case with hiding keyboard, MultiBay, palmrest with speakers.

12.1" screens and S3 Aurora64V+ (2 MB) video; 305 mm × 235 mm × 39 mm; ~2.7+ kg (up to 3.2 with CD-rom); up to 128 MB RAM (2 slots), with no soldered.

7300 model differences
Model	Released	CPU	base RAM	Screen
7330T	1997/08	Pentium MMX (150)	16 mb	12.1 800x600 TN
7350DT	1998	Pentium MMX (166)		12.1 800x600 TN
7360DT	1997/11	Pentium MMX (200)	32 mb	12.1 800x600 TN
7360DMT	1997/11	Pentium MMX (200)	32 mb	12.1 800x600 TN
7370DT	1997/11	Pentium MMX (233)	32	12.1 1024x768 TN
7380DT		Pentium MMX (266)	32	12.1 1024x768 TN
7380DMT	1998/01	Pentium MMX (266)	32	12.1 1024x768 TN

=== Armada 7700 series ===
Successor of LTE 5000 line, starts in end of 1997 with 7750MT model. White case with no palmrest, speakers on the sides of screen.

~3.3-3.5 kg, 320 mm × 242 mm × 51 mm; 2 EDO RAM slots + soldered. S3 Aurora video (2 MB).

7700 model differences
Model	Released	CPU	RAM	Screen
7710MT		Pentium MMX (150)	2 slots, 16 MB soldered (up to 128)	
7730MT	1997	Pentium MMX (166)	2 slots, 32 MB soldered (up to 144)	12.1" TN 800x600
7750MT	1997	Pentium MMX (166)	2 slots, 32 MB soldered (up to 144)	12.1" TN 1024x768
7770MT		Pentium MMX (233)	2 slots, 32 MB soldered (up to 144)	
7770DMT	1997/10	Pentium MMX (233)	2 slots, 32 MB soldered (up to 144)	12.1" TN 800x600
With another topcase and speakers under of screen:
7790DMT	1998	Pentium MMX (233)	2 slots, 32 MB soldered (up to 144)	13" TN 1024x768
7792DMT	1998/01	Pentium MMX (266)	2 slots, 32 MB soldered (up to 144)	13" TN 1024x768

== Armada 1500/1700 series, 3500, 7400 and 7800 ==
Released in the end of 1997 (1500 line) and 1998-1999 (all another lines). They had a new case design with a wavy palmrest.

There were value 1500 and 1700 lines (with touchpad), slim 3500 line and hi-end 7400 and 7800 lines (with pointing stick only). Only 1500/1700 lines can be purchased in consumer electronic shops, and only 1700 had a Windows 98 option instead of the option of Windows 98, Windows 95, Windows 2000, Windows XP, or Windows ME. The 7400 and 7800 lines were upgraded and facelifted versions of 7300 and 7700 lines with the same dock options; the newer 3500 model had a personal dock option.

=== Armada 1500 and 1700 series ===
Both series looked similar (dark-gray bulky cases with touchpad), but had different sizes and platforms (Pentium I or II for 1500 and only Pentium II for 1700). The 1500 models had a CD/DVD bay in right side of laptop, instead of 1700 line with frontal bay placement. Both model lines supported the Convenience Base II dock.

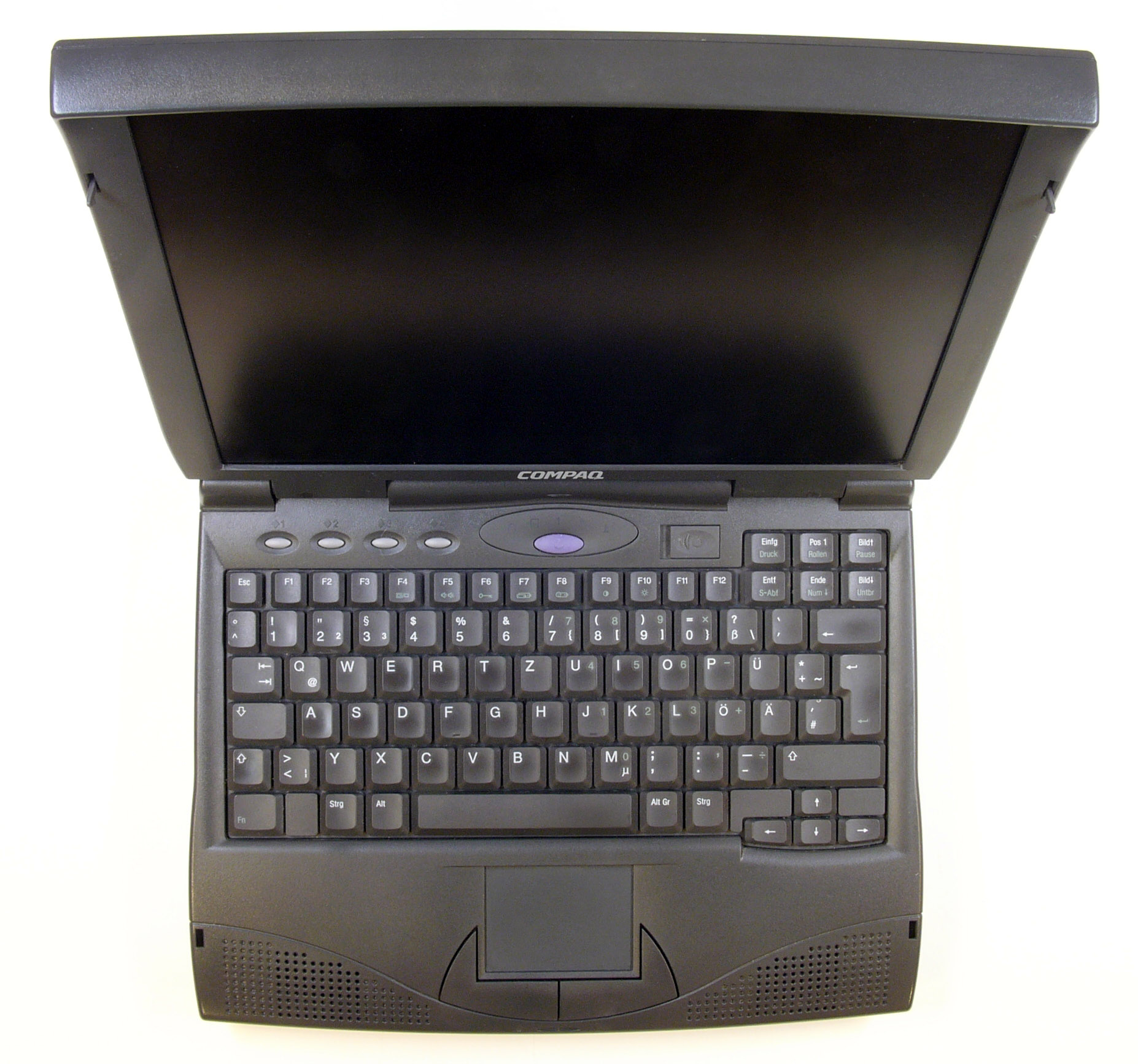
Armada 1550DMT

1500 series — 310 x 244 x 53 mm; ~3.3 kg. 16 or 32 MB RAM soldered, 1 slot. C&T 68554 video (2MB). One USB port, an infrared port, and two PCMCIA slots were included. One side had a slot for swapping between an additional battery and a floppy disk drive. The early 1510-1598 models supported only EDO RAM, instead of Pentium II-based 1500 model with the SDRAM option.

1500 model differences
Model	Released	CPU	RAM	Screen	Note
1500	1999/09	Pentium II	Up to 192 MB (64 soldered)	?	EDO or SDRAM; CT69000 video
1500c	1999/09	Celeron (266/300/400)	Up to 160 MB (32 soldered)	12.1", CSTN or TN 800x600	Doesn't support EDO RAM, SDRAM only.
1505DM		Pentium MMX (200)	Up to 96 MB (32 soldered)	12.1", CSTN 800x600	NiMH battery rather than Li-On, 2.1 GB HDD rather than 3.1
1510	1997/06	Pentium (120)	Up to 80 MB (16 soldered)	11.3", DSTN	no CD-ROM, Ni-cd battery.
1510DM		Pentium (120)	Up to 80 MB (16 soldered)	11.3", CSTN 800x600	
1520	1997/07	Pentium (133)	Up to 80 MB (16 soldered)	11.3", DSTN	
1520DM	1997	Pentium (133)	Up to 80 MB (16 soldered)	11.3", CSTN 800x600	
1530	1997/09	Pentium (133)	Up to 80 MB (16 soldered)	12.1", DSTN	no CD-ROM
1530D	1997/08	Pentium (133)	Up to 80 MB (16 soldered)	12.1", DSTN	
1540DM	1997	Pentium (150)	Up to 80 MB (16 soldered)	12.1", DSTN	
1550DMT	1997	Pentium (133)	Up to 80 MB (16 soldered)	12.1", CTFT 800x600	1.4 GB HDD rather than 1.0 GB
1560	1998/01	Pentium MMX (166)	Up to 80 MB (16 soldered)	12.1", CSTN (HCA) 800x600	no CD-ROM
1560DM	1998/01	Pentium MMX (166)	Up to 80 MB (16 soldered)	12.1", DSTN 800x600	
1571DM		Pentium MMX (200)	Up to 96 MB (32 soldered)	12.1", CSTN 800x600	
1573DM		Pentium MMX (233)	Up to 96 MB (32 soldered)	12.1", CSTN 800x600	
1580DT		?	?	?	
1580DMT	1997/07	Pentium MMX (150)	Up to 80 MB (16 soldered)	12.1", TN	
1590DT	1998/04	Pentium MMX (166)	Up to 80 MB (16 soldered)	12.1", TN 800x600	no modem
1590DMT	1997/09	Pentium MMX (166)	Up to 80 MB (16 soldered)	12.1", TN 800x600	
1592DT	1998/06	Pentium MMX (233)	Up to 96 MB (32 soldered)	12.1", TN 800x600	no modem
1592DMT	1998/01	Pentium MMX (233)	Up to 96 MB (32 soldered)	12.1", CTFT 800x600	
1598		Pentium MMX (266)	?	?	
1598DMT	1998/03	Pentium MMX (266)	Up to 96 MB (32 soldered)	13.3", CTFT 1024×768	4.0 GB HDD rather than 3.2 GB

1700 series — 318x245x58 mm; 3.6+ kg, up to 14.1" (1024x768); 1 slot + soldered RAM. CD/DVD + FDD (MultiBay)

- 1700 — Pentium II (233-300); 32 MB soldered, up to 160 MB RAM. 12.1"/13.3/14.1" screen options;

- 1750 — Pentium II (333-400); 64 MB soldered, up to 192 MB.

=== Armada 3500 ===
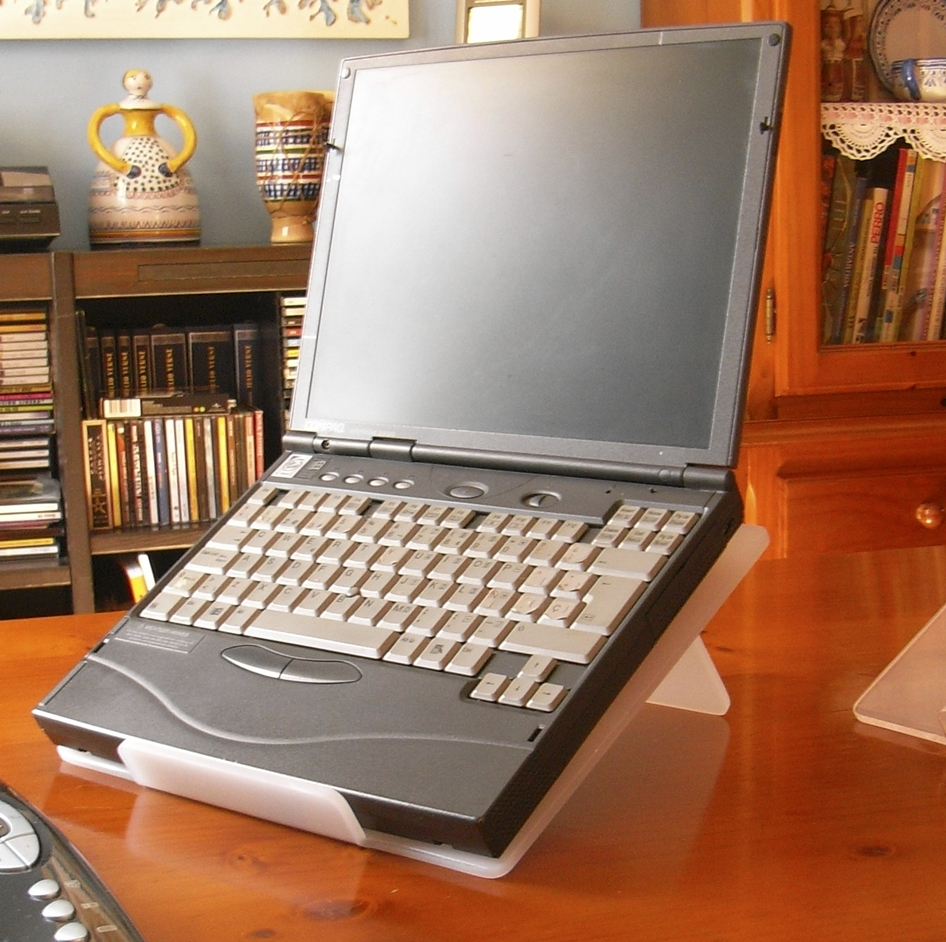
Armada 3500

Slim line; 300 mm × 236 mm × 33 mm, ~2 kg; Pentium II (266-366); 12.1/13.3" LCD (800x600/1024x768), Chips and Technologies 69000 2 MB, USB; Dock port.

=== Armada 7400 ===
High-end model; 318 mm × 244 mm × 41 mm. 1999; 13.3- or 14-inch LCD (1024x768), Pentium II (266-366); CD/DVD-rom, S3 Virge/MX (4 MB); 2 RAM slots, up to 256 MB. Magnesium top cover and speakers in wavy palmrest.

=== Armada 7800 ===
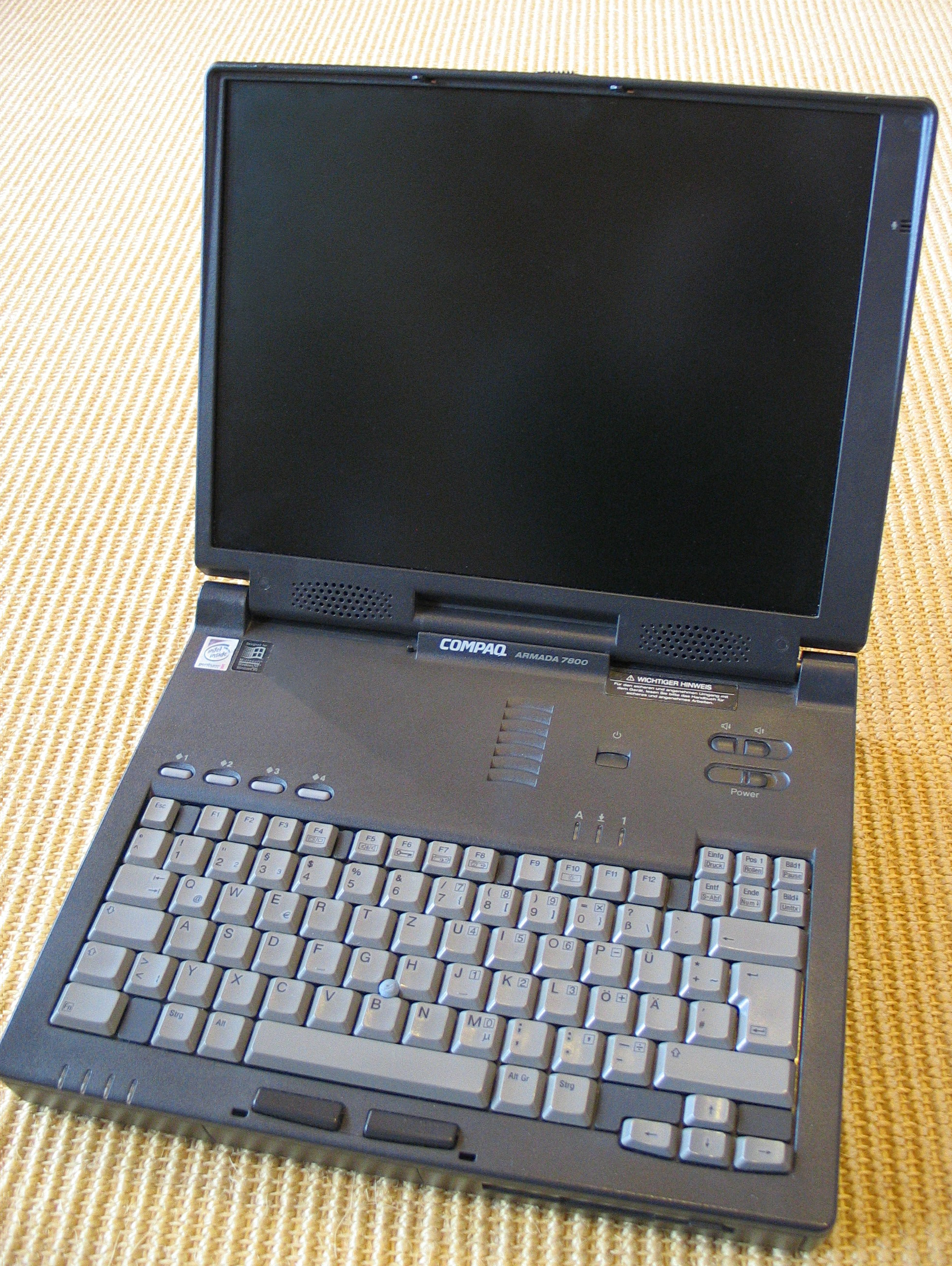
Armada 7800

Top model; Facelifted version (but dark gray instead of white) of 77#0 series with another display module and top cover.

Pentium II (266-400); S3 Virge (4 MB); 13.3- or 14-inch screen; up to 256 MB RAM (2 slots).

== Armada 6500 ==
High-end series with another case design (Touchpad and big flat palmrest; 305 mm × 247 mm × 35 mm and 2.7+ kg). Successor of DEC's Digital HiNote Ultra 2000. Supports Compaq Mobile6500 Expansion Unit or Compaq Armada6500 Convenience Base.

1998; Pentium II (300-400); 14.1"; 64 mb soldered, up to 320 MB (1 slot). USB. AGP-based 3D RAGE LT Pro (4 MB) video.

== Armada E, M and V series ==
Released in 2000; New case design with light blue touchpad buttons.

E is the mainstream series; M is the ultra-mobile series, and V is (V)ersatile.

=== Armada V300 and E500 ===
Same models with internal differences; 14.7"-based case, with 14.1-, 13.3- and 12.1-inch screens options. 316 mm × 254 mm × 42 mm. The Compaq Armada E500 and Armada V300 Series of Personal Computers offer advanced modularity, Intel Pentium II, III, and Celeron processors, AGP port implementation, and extensive multimedia support. The computers provide desktop functionality and connectivity through the optional expansion base, convenience base, or port replicator. This model has a gray flat-shape case with lifting feet. ATI Rage Mobility-P graphics card with 4 MB VRAM; up to 512 MB RAM is supported by the system.

Armada V300 — Budget model, Touchpad only; Intel Celeron Processor (400-500MHz); 64 or 32 MB RAM included as standard. Upgradable to 512 MB.

Armada E500 — Pointstick or Touchpad; Intel Pentium II or III Processor (366MHz-1.0GHz); 64 MB RAM soldered on some models. Supports additional battery instead of FDD. has two PC Card slots (instead of one in V300 model). May have a 15" screen with slightly bigger top lid and with extremely thin bezels.

Armada E500s — Intel Pentium III or Celeron Processor (up to 800MHz)

=== Armada M300 ===
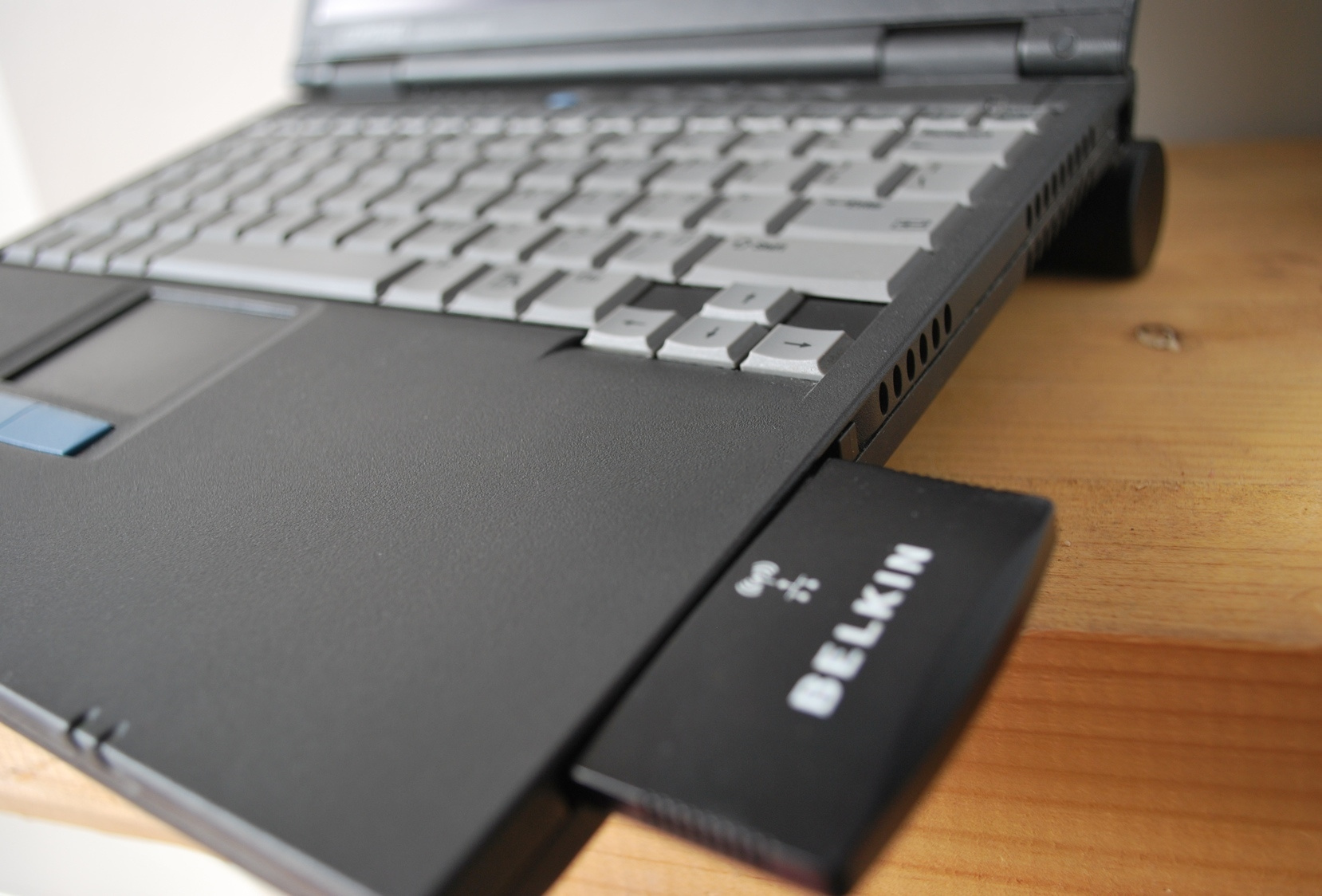
Close view of Armada M300 with extended battery and PC Card

High-end thin-and-light ultraportable laptop without a CD or FDD-disk drive, successor of DEC HiNote Ultra line; they started around $1,999 with base configuration. Intel Pentium II or III Processor (333-600 MHz), Touchpad; ATI Rage LT Pro graphics card with 4 MB VRAM. Magnesium-alloy case, 1 RAM slot, 64 MB soldered, up to 320 MB; 1.6 kg. 11.3-inch 800x600 or 1024x768 LCD screen. 264 mm × 229 mm × 23 mm.

=== Armada M700 ===
Thin-and-light version of E700 model. Pointstick or touchpad; Pentium II (from 366) or III (650-1000); 14.1" with up to 1024x768. 2 RAM slots, 64 MB soldered; up to 576 MB. CD/DVD drive. ATI Mobility PRO graphics card with 8 MB VRAM. Magnesium top cover. 315 mm × 250 mm × 28 mm, ~2.2 kg. They have a positive PC Mag review.

=== Armada E700 ===
A larger version of the E500, with 2 MultiBay slots to insert either an optical drive or battery. The laptop also had an internal power supply. Pentium II or III (400-500), 14" or 15" 1024 × 768 screens. Up to 640 MB (with 128 MB soldered) RAM. 320 mm × 260 mm × 51 mm, ~4.0 kg.

== Armada 100s and 110 ==
Last generation with low-end models only; the hi-end lines now branded as Compaq Evo. This sub-line also has a similar dark-gray case design (with touchpad option only, and the blue buttons is only featured with 110/110s models). Both models have a one CD/DVD and one FDD drive. They don't have a docking port.

=== Armada 100s ===
2000; this model has a sibling low-end version with "Notebook 100" name. Armada 100s was suited to its target small/medium-sized business market.

AMD K6-2+ (533); 1 RAM slot, 64 or 32 MB soldered, up to 192 or 160 MB; Trident CyberBlade i7 (8 MB). 800x600 12.1" or 1024x768 13.3" screen options. ~3.1 kg. 297 mm × 239 mm × 44 mm.

=== Armada 110 ===
2001; Affordable version of Evo N110 model.

Pentium III(800-850); up to 320 MB RAM (64 soldered); 14.1" 1024x768, or 12.1" 800x600; 318 mm × 248 mm × 42 mm, ~3.4 kg. ATI RAGE LT Pro (4 MB).; 3.2 kg

Armada 110s − Celeron (700-850) is only difference; Exist the uncommon model with 128 MB of soldered RAM.

== Docks ==
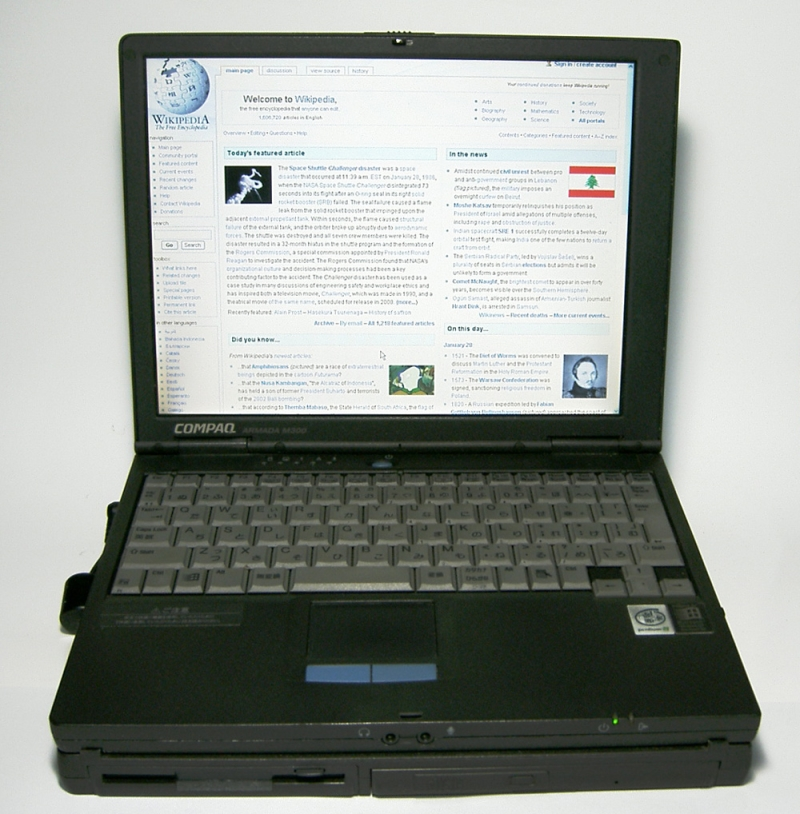
Armada M300 with docking station

The models that do not support docks: 1100 and 100/110 series.

Convenience Base — Armada 4100 series.

Convenience Base II — For Armada 1500, 1700, and 3500 series.

Convenience Base EM − For (E500)

Port Replicator EM — For (E500)?

Compaq expansion base — ?

Mobile 3500 expansion unit — Armada 3500.

Expansion base mobile unit — Armada M300 (also Evo N200). Has a docking connector to a Convenience base EM.

ArmadaStation, Armada MiniStation E, MiniStation EX — for 7000 series (include 7300/7400 and 7700/7800 series).

Mobile6500 Expansion Unit, Armada6500 Convenience Base — 6500 model only.

Preceded by Compaq Contura (low-end); Compaq LTE (Hi-end)	Compaq Armada; 1996 - 2001	Succeeded by Compaq Evo
