= Forrest S. Mozer =

Astrophysicist

Forrest Mozer
- Born: February 13, 1929 (age 97); Lincoln, Nebraska, U.S.
- Education: California Institute of Technology
- Scientific career
- Thesis: Experimental determination and theoretical analysis of the elastic scattering of protons by beryllium (1956)
- Doctoral students: Cynthia Cattell

Forrest S. Mozer (born February 13, 1929, in Lincoln, Nebraska) is an American experimental physicist, inventor, and entrepreneur known best for his pioneering work on electric field measurements in space plasma and for development of solid state electronic speech synthesizers and speech recognizers.

== Scientific research ==
He received his B.S. in physics from University of Nebraska in 1951, and both his M.S. and Ph.D. in physics from California Institute of Technology (Caltech) in 1956. After graduation he worked as a nuclear researcher at Caltech, then continued his research at Lockheed Missiles and Space Co., at Aerospace Corporation, and at the Centre National de la Recherche Scientifique in Paris. Around 1963 his interest shifted to high energy particles in the aurora. In 1966 he joined the physics department of the University of California, Berkeley, where he became full professor in 1970. In 1982, Mozer and his colleagues at UC Berkeley were the first to experimentally observe electrostatic solitary waves in the Earth's magnetosphere. He has held appointments as Vice Chairman of the Physics Department and Associate Director of the Space Sciences Laboratory. His recent research continues 40 years of rocket and satellite measurements.

Mozer has more than 300 scientific publications, and he has received numerous honors and recognition for his scientific work:

- Awarded Guggenheim Fellowship (1962)
- UC Berkeley Academic Senate Distinguished teaching award, 1977.
- Hannes Alfvén Medal, awarded by the European Geosciences Union, 2004.
- Fellow, American Geophysical Union
- Fellow, American Physical Society (1977)
- John Adam Fleming Medal, American Geophysical Union (2018)

== Inventor and entrepreneur ==
Mozer invented and patented the first integrated circuit speech synthesizer in 1974. He first licensed this technology to TeleSensory Systems, which used it in the "Speech+" talking calculator for blind persons. Later National Semiconductor also licensed the technology, used for its "DigiTalker" speech synthesizer, the MM54104.

In 1984, Mozer co-founded Electronic Speech Systems (now ESS Technology) to develop and market speech synthesis systems based on Mozer's patents. His work in speech synthesis led to ideas of how to create a single-chip speech recognizer. In 1994, Mozer and his son Todd Mozer, founded Sensory Circuits, Inc. (now Sensory, Inc.), where they developed and introduced the RSC-164 speech recognition integrated circuit. Since its inception Sensory has supplied speech recognition to products that have sold more than half a billion units.

Mozer served as technology consultant to Masayoshi Son when Son was still a college student in Berkeley. Mozer helped Son start an early business endeavor involving electronic translators for spoken language.

Mozer has 17 issued US patents in the areas of speech synthesis and speech recognition.
