= Compaq C series =

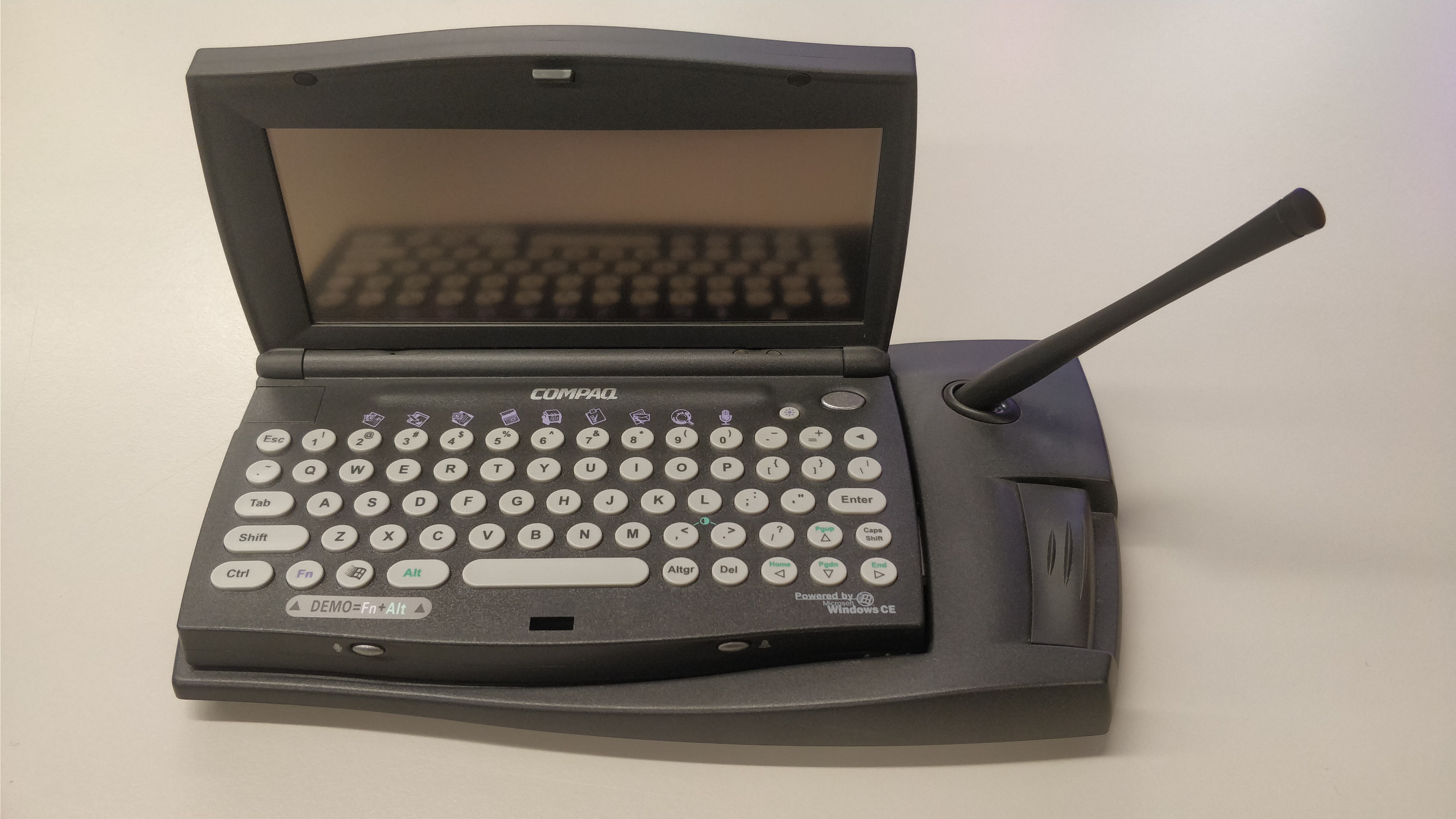
- Manufacturer: Compaq
- Series: Handheld PC
- First released: November 1998
- Predecessor: Compaq Aero
- Successor: iPAQ
- Related: HP Jornada; Compaq Aero
- Dimensions: 3.4 x 18.6 x 10 cm (810c); 4.1 x 18.6 x 10 cm (2010c)
- Weight: 395 g (14 oz)(810c); 430g(2010c)
- Operating system: Windows CE
- CPU: 75 MHz RISC MIPS processor
- Memory: 16 MB ROM; 8 MB RAM (810c); 20 MB RAM (2010c)
- Removable storage: PC Card
- Battery: 2 NiMH batteries
- Display: 640 x 240 STN, 256 colours
- Connectivity: IrDA, 33.6 kbps Modem
- Data inputs: Resistive touchscreen
- Website: compaq.com/portables/ at the Wayback Machine (archived 1999-04-20)

The Compaq C series was a series of Handheld PCs running on Windows CE 2.0, manufactured by Compaq in 1998.

== Description ==
The C series replaced the Aero line of handheld PCs. It was succeeded, as with other HPCs manufactured by Compaq and HP, by the iPAQ line of Pocket PCs.

The C series featured an integrated 33.6 kbit/s modem. For wireless data transfer, it sported an IrDA port.

An upgrade to Windows CE 2.11 could be purchased from Compaq for US$109.

Targus Inc. manufactured a leather portfolio case for the C series, under the Compaq brand.
