= Kohjinsha =

- Native name: 株式会社工人舎
- Company type: Public company
- Founded: December 13, 2004
- Headquarters: Yokohama, Japan
- Parent: Inventec
- Website: www.kohjinsha.com

Kohjinsha (KJS) was a Japanese PC manufacturer best known outside Japan for their current SA1F00 UMPC. In November 2006, the company announced KOHJINSHA SA, a series of lightweight computers of simple configuration, that come with a high specification for the price, attracting the attention of enthusiast market. According to market information firm BCN, it was the market leader in Japan for computers with screens smaller than 11 inches.
