= Compaq Contura =

Line of notebook-sized laptops produced by Compaq

Contura

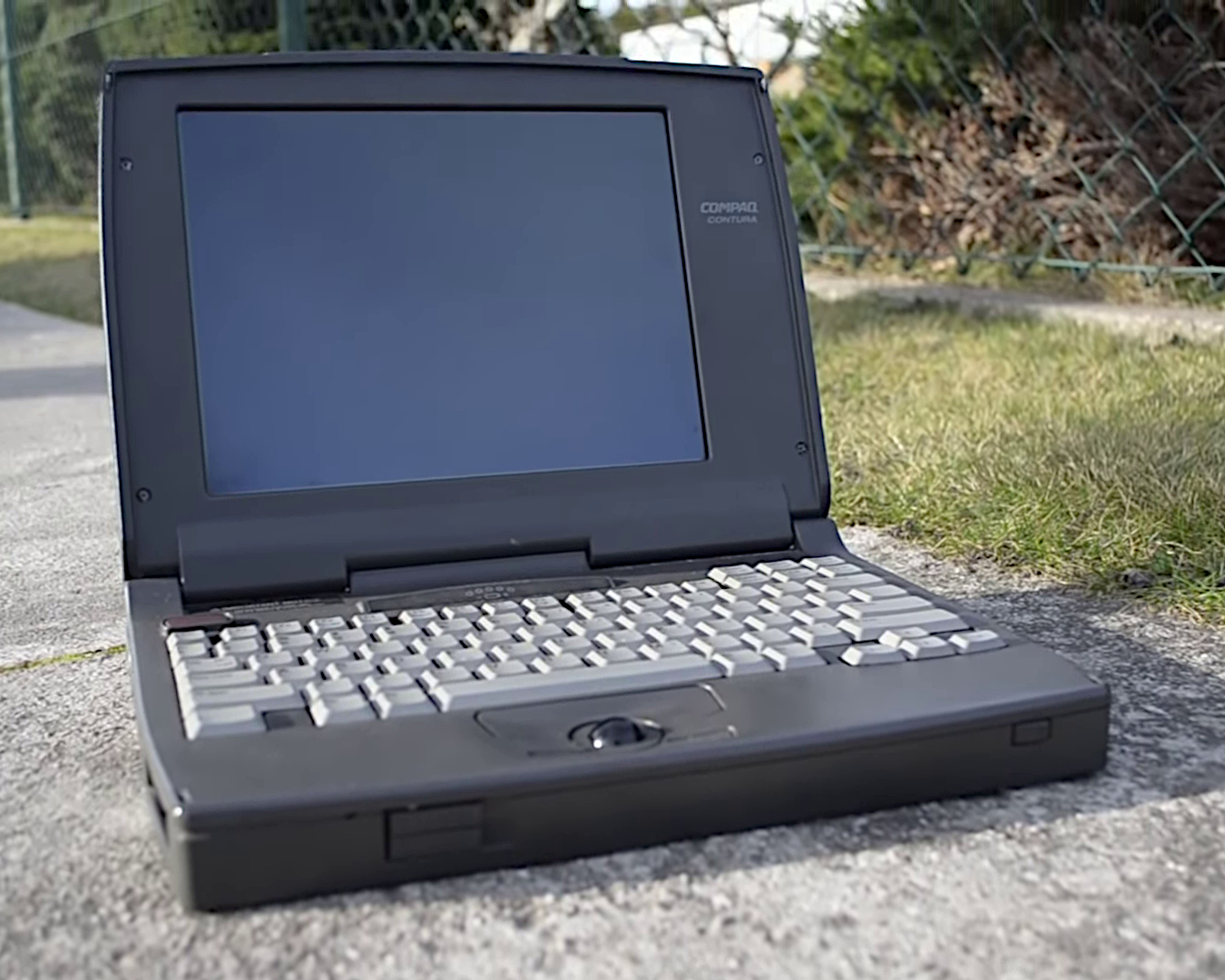
- Contura 430C
- Developer: Compaq
- Type: Laptop (notebook)
- Released: 1992–1996
- Successor: Compaq Armada
- Website: compaq.com/support/portables at the Wayback Machine (archived 1999-04-21)

The Contura is a line of notebook-sized laptops produced by Compaq from 1992 to 1996. The Contura was Compaq's first attempt at making an affordable, entry-level laptop.

== Models ==
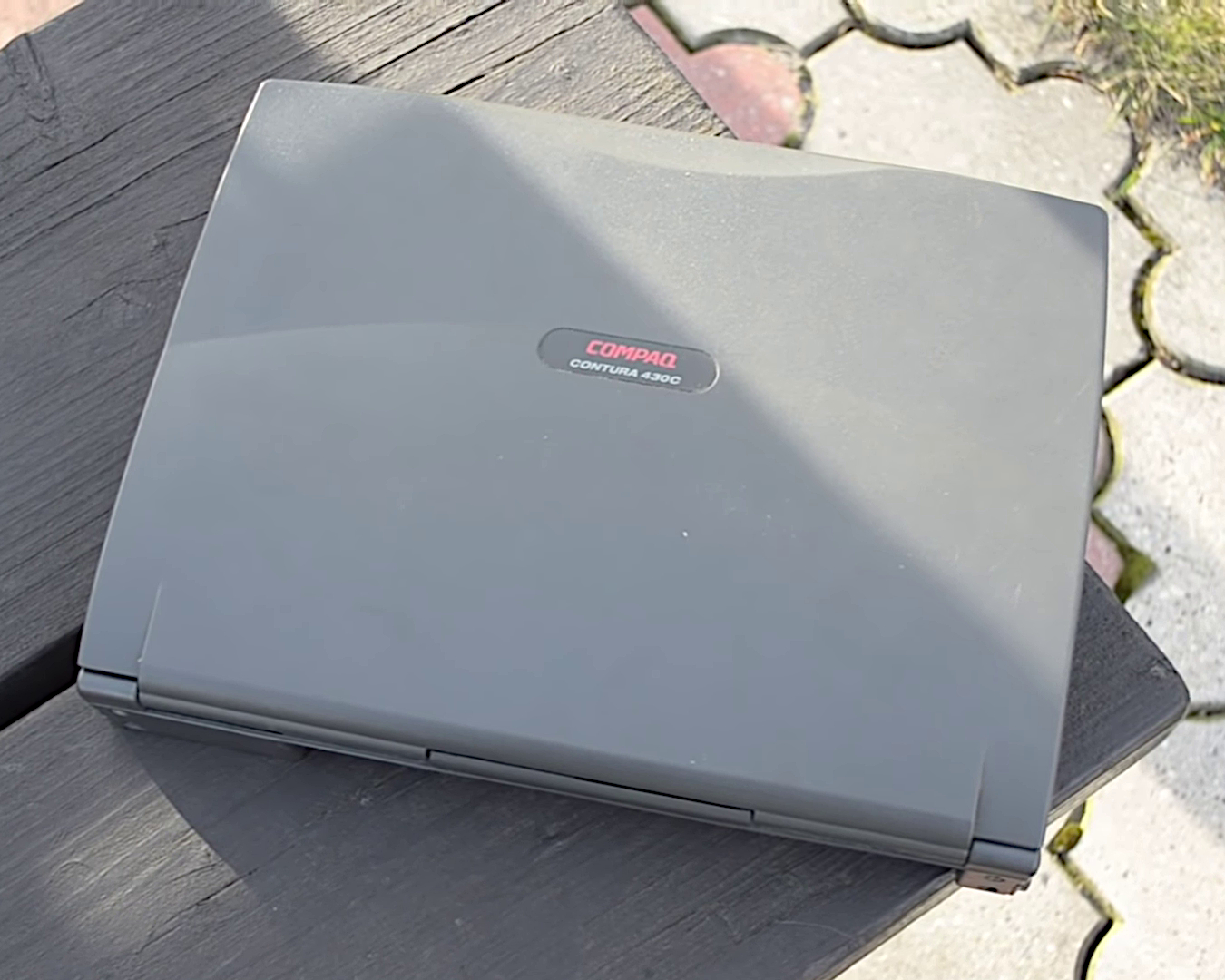
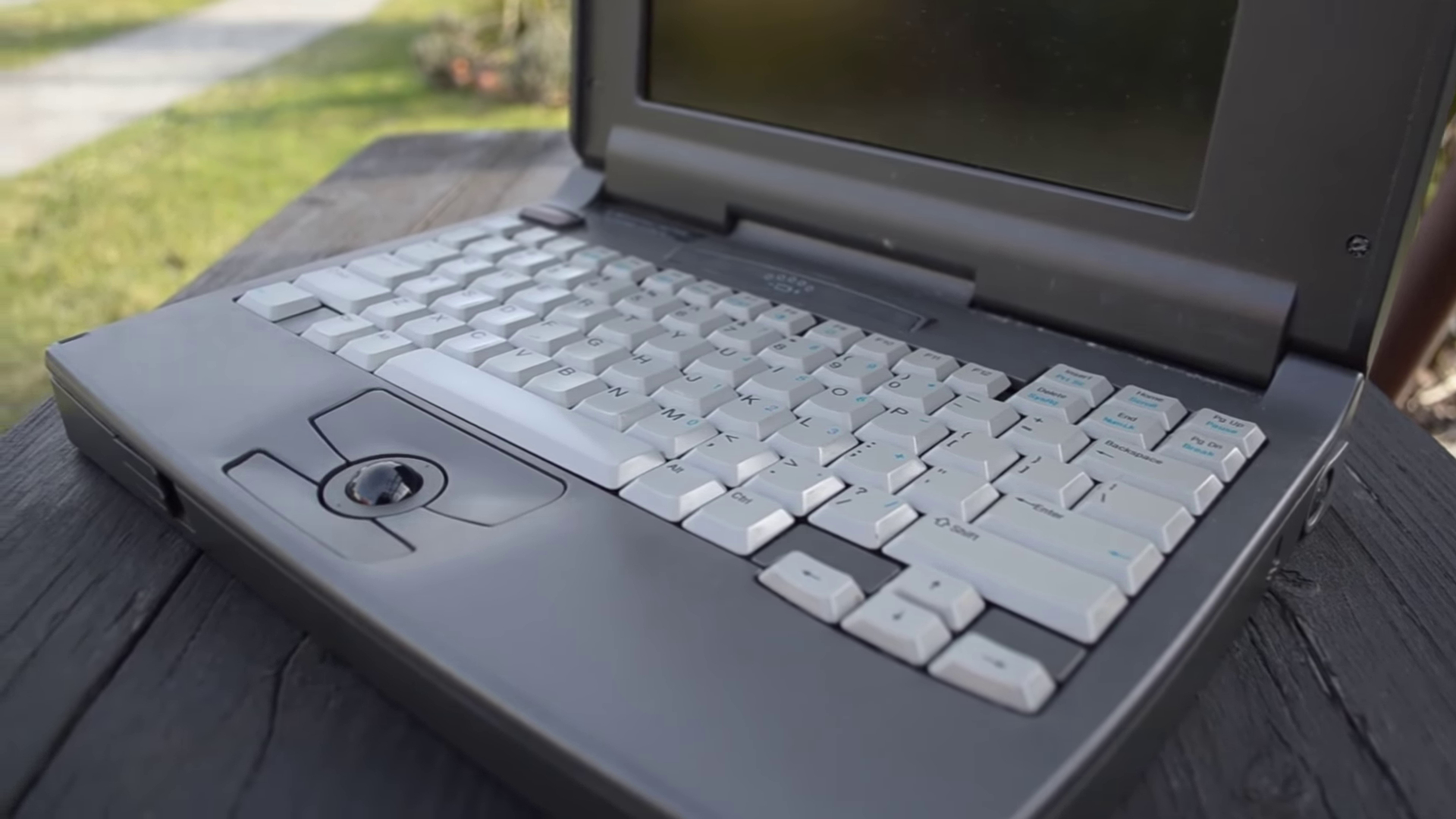
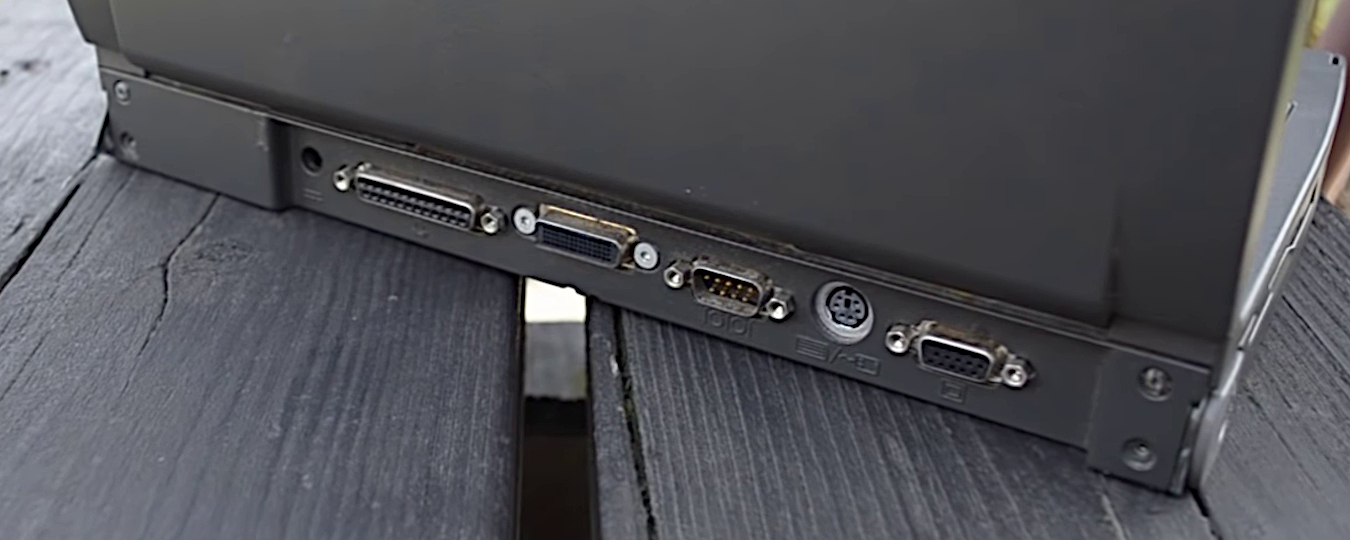
Clockwise from upper left: Top-down view of 430C with case closed; detail of keyboard and trackball; rear ports (from left to right: DC power, parallel, docking base, serial, PS/2, VGA)

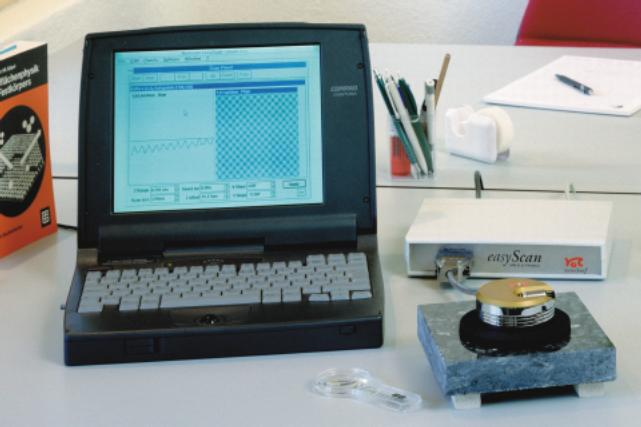
Compaq Contura 420C running scientific software

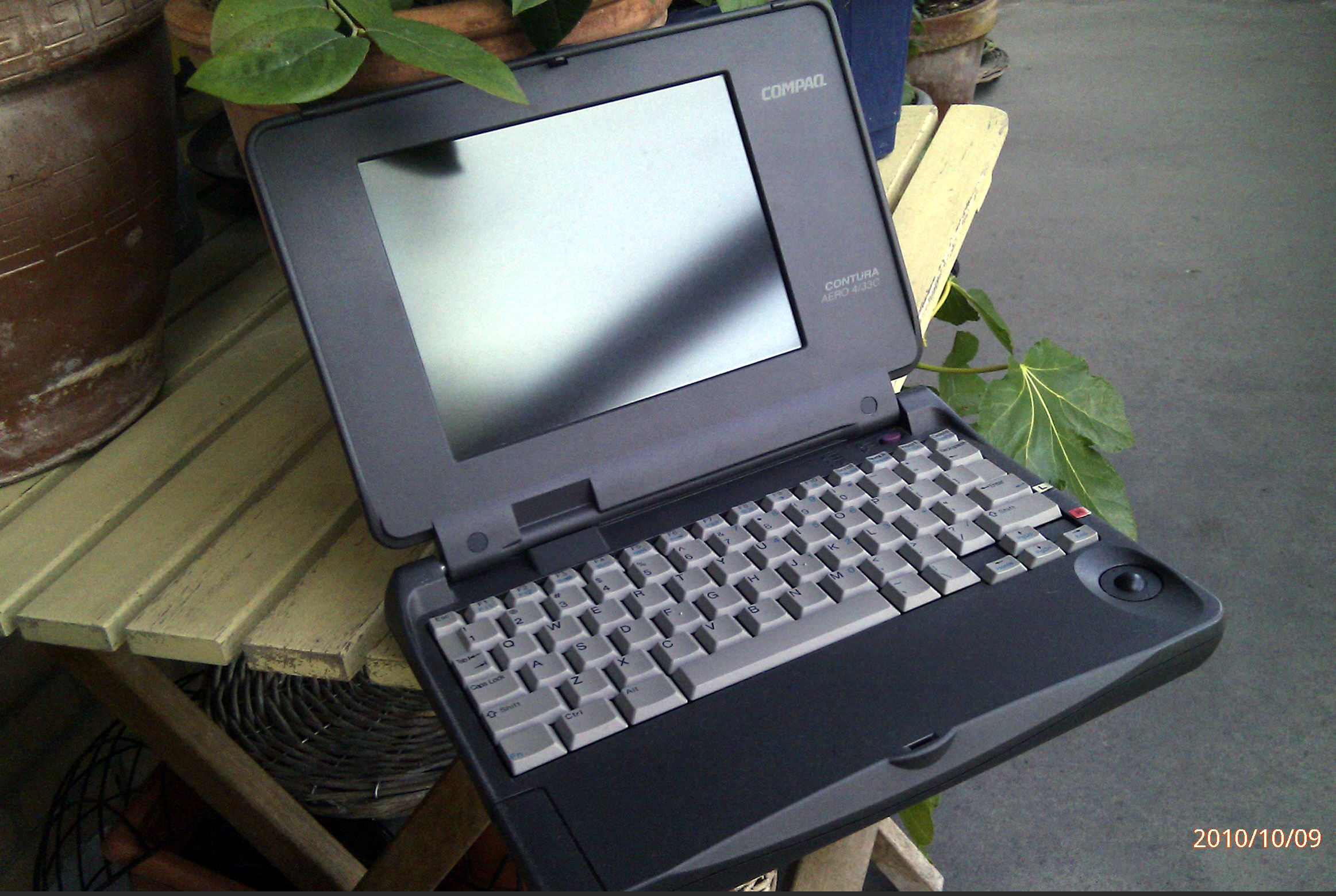
Contura Aero 4/33c

The main Contura series included models 3/20, 3/25, 3/25c, 4/25, 4/25c, 4/25cx, 400, 400C, 400CX, 410, 410C, 410CX, 420C, 420CX, 430C, and 430CX. These were standard-size notebooks, not ultraportable subnotebook computers. The “X” designation denoted an active matrix screen.

The Compaq Contura Aero 4/25 and 4/33c were among the earliest subnotebook computers that acted as a precursor to netbooks. They were released in 1994 and originally ran MS-DOS and Windows 3.1. They were also able to run Windows 95 after its release in 1995. Furthermore, they were similar to the Armada line of laptop computers, but smaller. Although the 4/25's GPU can produce color, the datasheet for the device states it is incapable of producing color graphics. This does not apply to the 4/33c.

This line of notebook PCs from Compaq was first succeeded by the Compaq C-Series and then by the Aero 1550 Pocket PC. The line of handheld devices starting from the Aero 1550 Pocket PC were finally moulded into the iPAQ line of handheld devices, which was handled by Hewlett-Packard, after their acquisition of Compaq.

| Series | Model | CPU | Display | RAM | Disk | Misc |
|---|---|---|---|---|---|---|
| Contura | 3/20 | 20 MHz 386SL | VGA monochrome | 2 MB | 40 or 84 MB | External trackball |
| Contura | 3/25c | 25 MHz 386SL | VGA color | 4 MB | 80 or 120 MB | External trackball |
| Contura | 4/25 | 25 MHz 486SL | VGA monochrome | 4 MB | 120 or 200 MB | External trackball |
| Contura | 4/25c | 25 MHz 486SL | VGA color | 4 MB | 120 or 200 MB | External trackball |
| Contura | 4/25cx | 25 MHz 486SL | VGA color, active matrix | 4 MB | 120 or 200 MB | Integrated trackball |
| Contura Aero | 4/25 | i486SX-S (SL enhanced 486SX) running at 25 MHz | Passive matrix gray scale VGA (16 shades (640x480) high resolution, 64 shades (320x200) low resolution, color capable when using an external VGA monitor) | 4 MB built-in (expandable to a maximum of 8 MB or 12 MB using an optional 4 or 8MB Compaq branded module, or 20 MB using a third party 16 MB module) | 84 MB, 170 MB or 250 MB 2.5" IDE hard disk drive | 256 KB video memory (512 KB exists in the system, but is not accessible by the GPU.), 1 PCMCIA slot (Type II), 1 ECP/EPP 1.9 capable parallel port, 1 RS-232, 1.5 x 10.25 x 7.5 inches (3.8 x 26 x 19 cm), Integrated trackball |
| Contura Aero | 4/33c | i486SX-S (SL enhanced 486SX) running at 33 MHz | Passive matrix color VGA (16 colors (640x480) high resolution, 256 colors (320x200) low resolution) | 4 MB built-in (expandable to a maximum of 8 or 12 MB using an optional 4 MB or 8 MB Compaq branded module, or 20 MB using a third party 16 MB module) | 84 MB, 170 MB or 250 MB 2.5" IDE hard disk drive | 256 KB video memory (512 KB exists in the system, but is not accessible by the GPU.), 1 PCMCIA slot (Type II), 1 ECP/EPP 1.9 capable parallel port, 1 RS-232 serial port (16550 UART), 1.7 x 10.25 x 7.5 inches (4.3 x 26 x 19 cm), Integrated trackball |
| Aero handheld | Compaq Aero 1500 Palm-size PC | | | | | |
| Aero handheld | Compaq Aero 2100 Color Palm-size PC | | | | | |
| Aero handheld | Compaq Aero 8000 Handheld PC Pro | | | | | |
