= Keith Cerny =

American opera director and businessman

Keith Cerny is an American opera director and businessman. From 2004 to 2007 he was executive director and CFO of the San Francisco Opera and from 2010 to 2018 he was general director of the Dallas Opera. In 2018 he was appointed general director of the Calgary Opera. He is also the former CEO of Sheet Music Plus (2008–2010), the world's largest interest-based sheet-music company. He is a graduate of the University of California, Berkeley (B.A. in music and B.S. in physics), the Harvard Business School (M.B.A.), and the Open University in the United Kingdom (Ph.D. in Economic Development Studies/Econometrics). He also studied conducting, voice, and accompanying at the Guildhall School of Music and Drama in London and studied opera-accompanying in English National Opera's répétiteur training course. He also worked for McKinsey & Company for six years where he was a Senior Engagement Manager, and seven years with the consulting firm Accenture. He is also an executive board member for Opera America.
