= Inventec =

Taiwanese manufacturer

Inventec Corporation
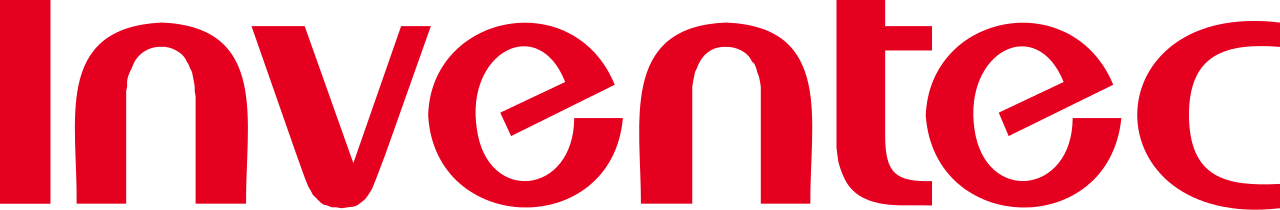

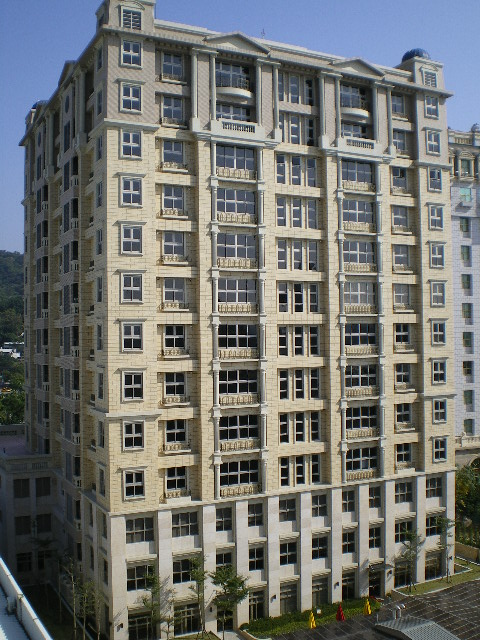
- Headquarters building in Taipei
- Native name: 英業達公司
- Type: Public
- Traded as: TWSE: 2356
- Industry: Computer hardware
- Founded: 1975; 51 years ago
- Headquarters: Taipei, Taiwan
- Revenue: ▲$7.2 billion USD (2006)
- Operating income: 8,184,463,000 New Taiwan dollar (2016)
- Net income: 4,971,373,000 New Taiwan dollar (2016)
- Total assets: 182,373,217,000 New Taiwan dollar (2016)
- Number of employees: 23,000+
- Subsidiaries: Kohjinsha
- Website: www.inventec.com

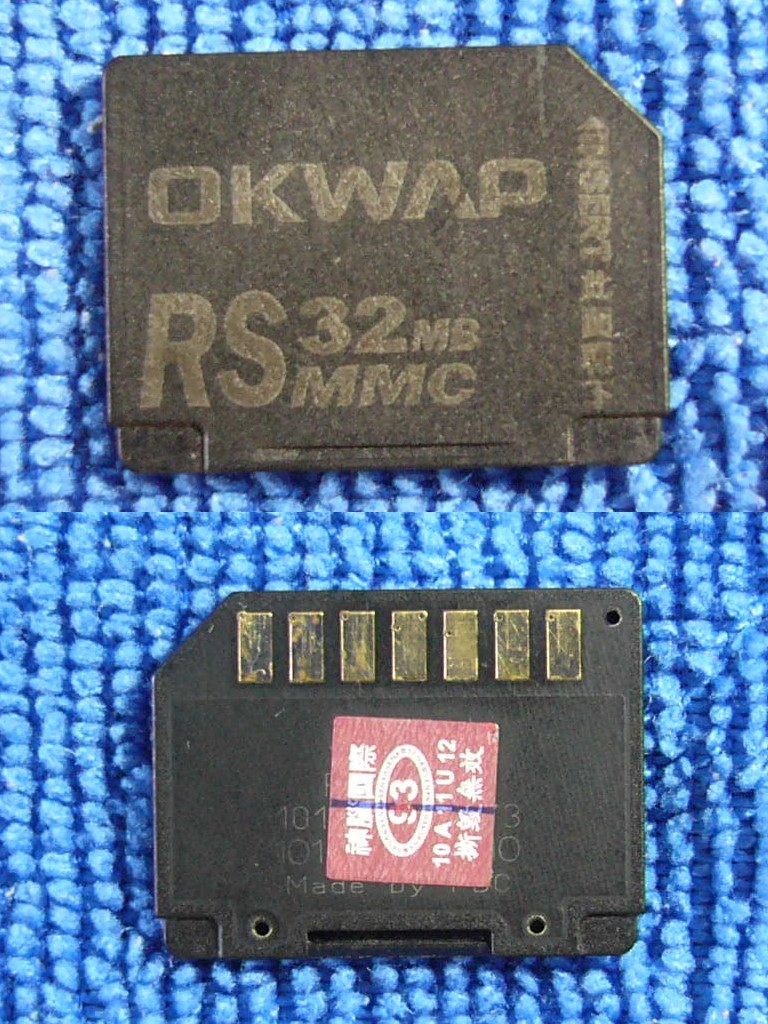
OKWAP subsidiary-branded RS-MMC card

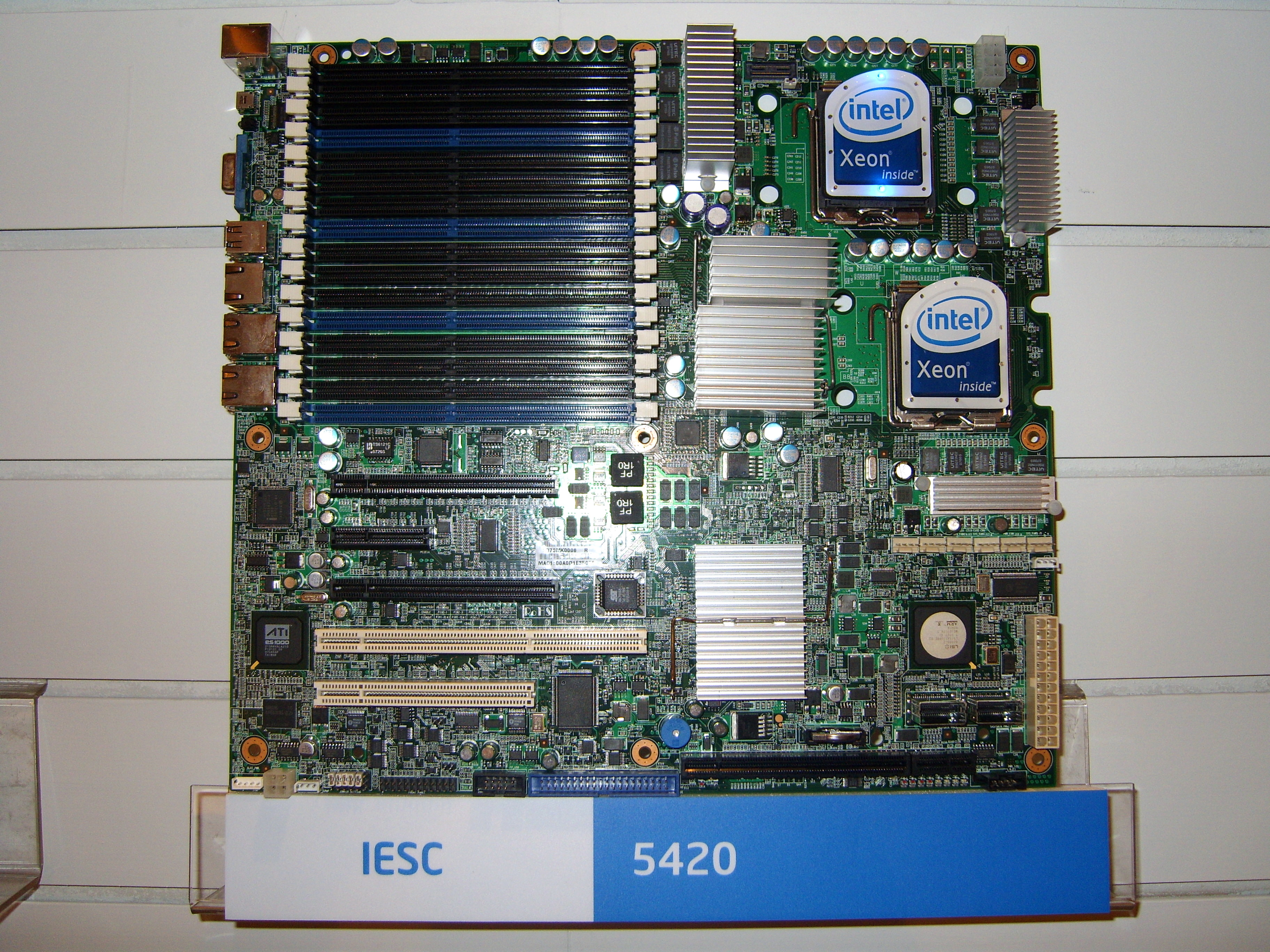
Inventec Enterprise Systems motherboard

Inventec Corporation (Chinese: 英業達公司; pinyin: Yīngyèdá Gōngsī; TWSE: 2356) is a Taiwan-based Original Design Manufacturer (ODM) making notebook computers, servers and mobile devices. Originally established in 1975 to develop and manufacture electronic calculators, major customers include Hewlett-Packard, Toshiba, Acer, and Fujitsu-Siemens.

Inventec Corporation has major development and manufacturing facilities in China and is one of their largest exporters. The company opened its first development center in China in 1991 and its first manufacturing facility in Shanghai in 1995. In addition, the company has configuration, and service centers in the United States, Europe, and Mexico.

The company has a workforce of over 23,000 employees, including over 3,000 engineers. It partially owns a Japan-based mini notebook brand vendor, Kohjinsha (KJS), which was established in Yokohama.

== Products ==
Name	Category	Operating system	Reference
Lyon	tablet	Windows	
N18C (Dr.Eye)	laptop	Android	
OKWAP	mobile phone	Windows Mobile	

=== Mobile phones ===
- OKWAP
- J98
- PHS-I99
- PHS-PG900
- PHS-PG901
- PHS-I92
- PHS-i501

== Clients ==
Client	Product	Reference
Amazon	Amazon Fire, Amazon Kindle	
Apple	Apple Newton	
Apple	IPod	
Apple	AirPods	
Apple	HomePod	
Barnes & Noble	Barnes & Noble Nook	

== Inventec BESTA ==
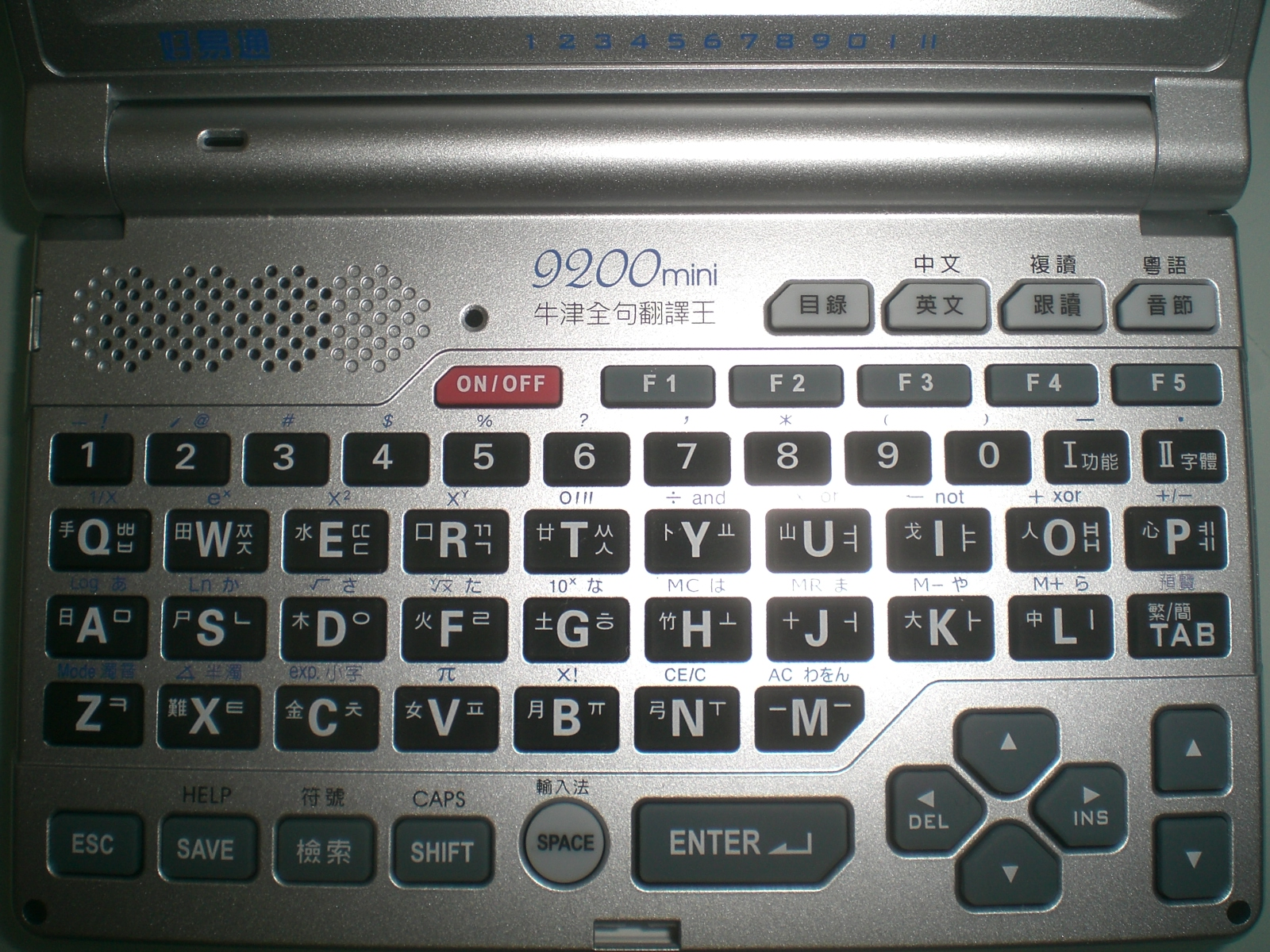
Inventec Besta 9200 Dictionary

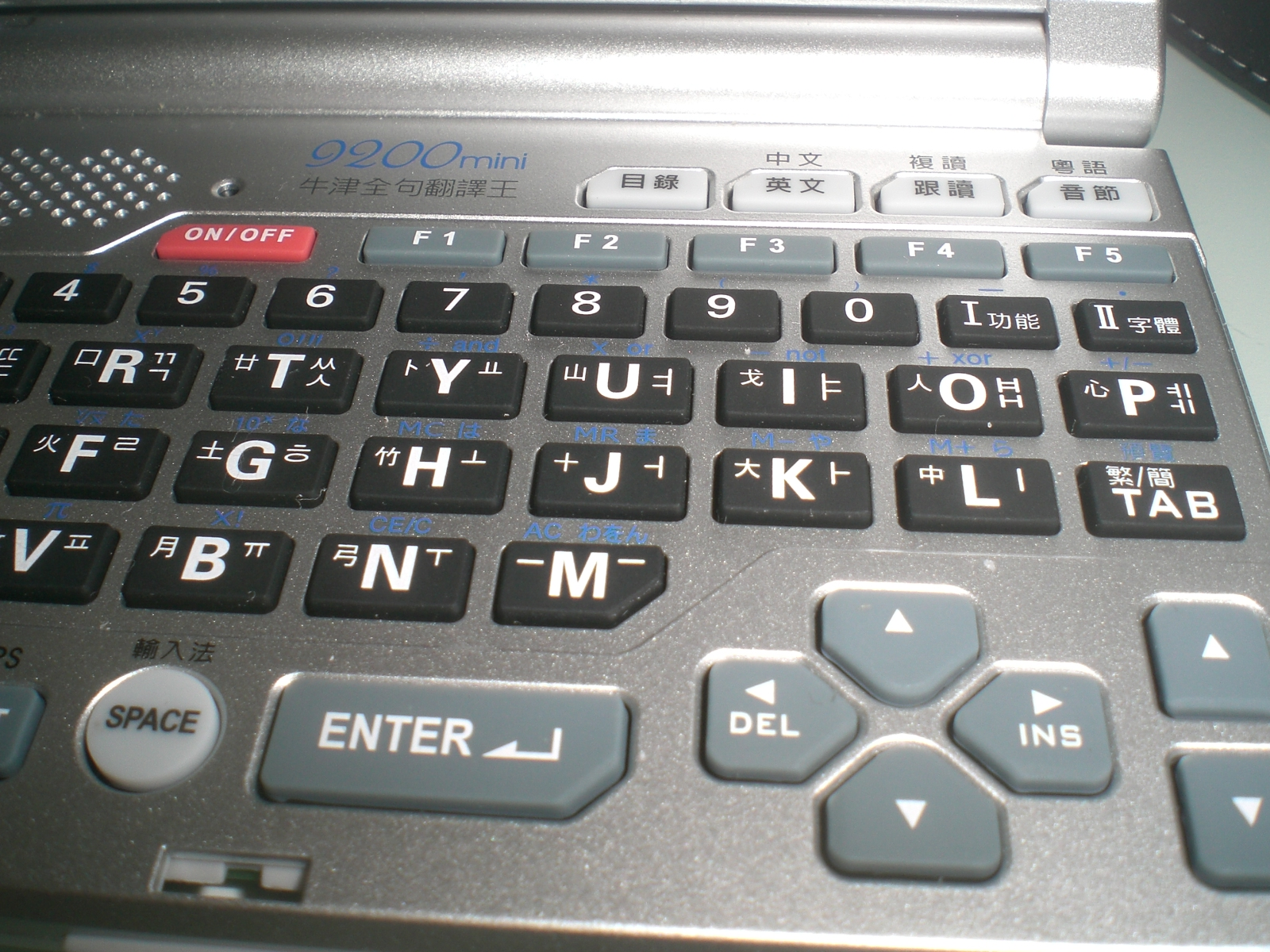
Inventec Besta 9200 Dictionary

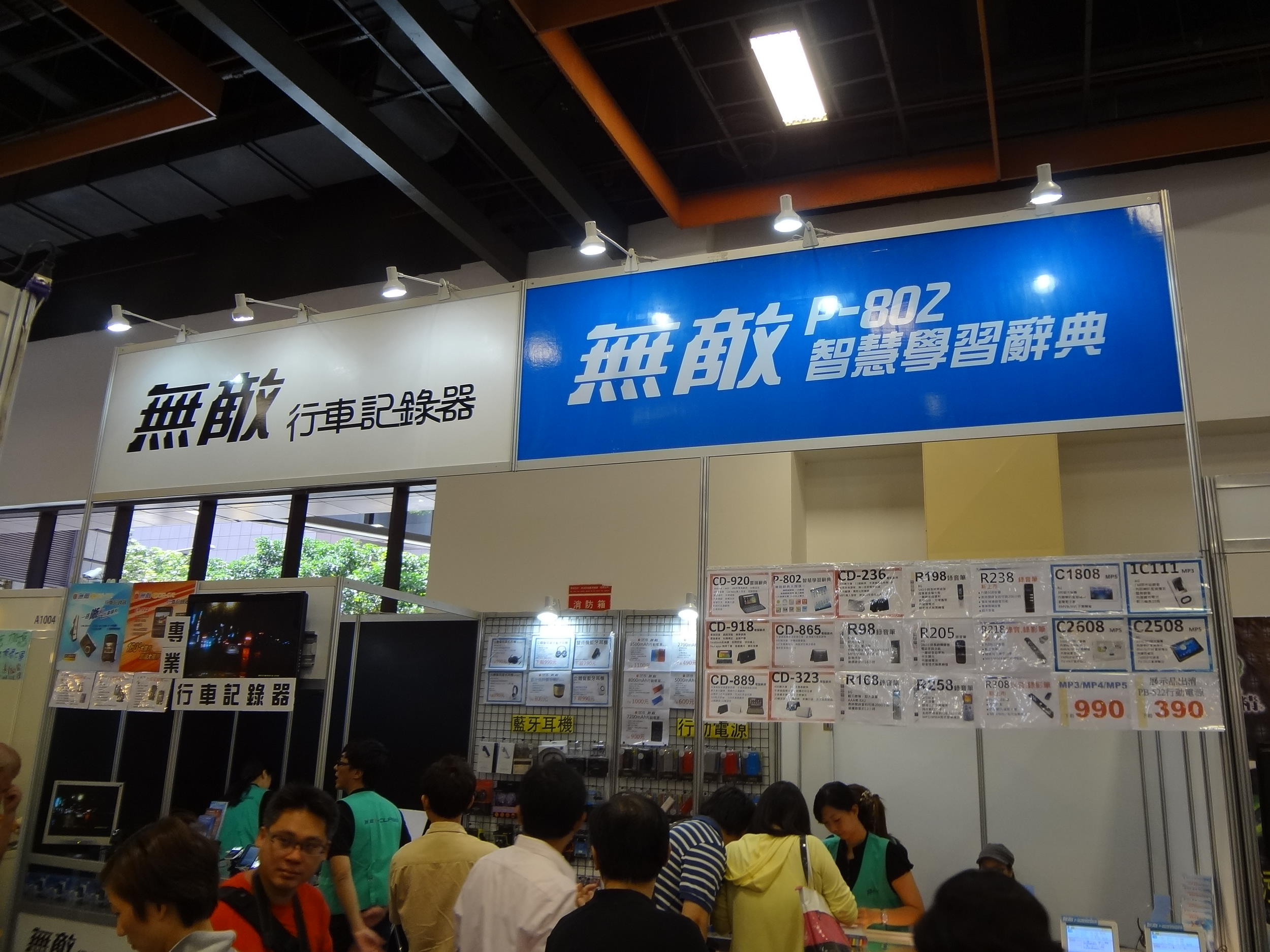
Besta booth at fair in Taipei

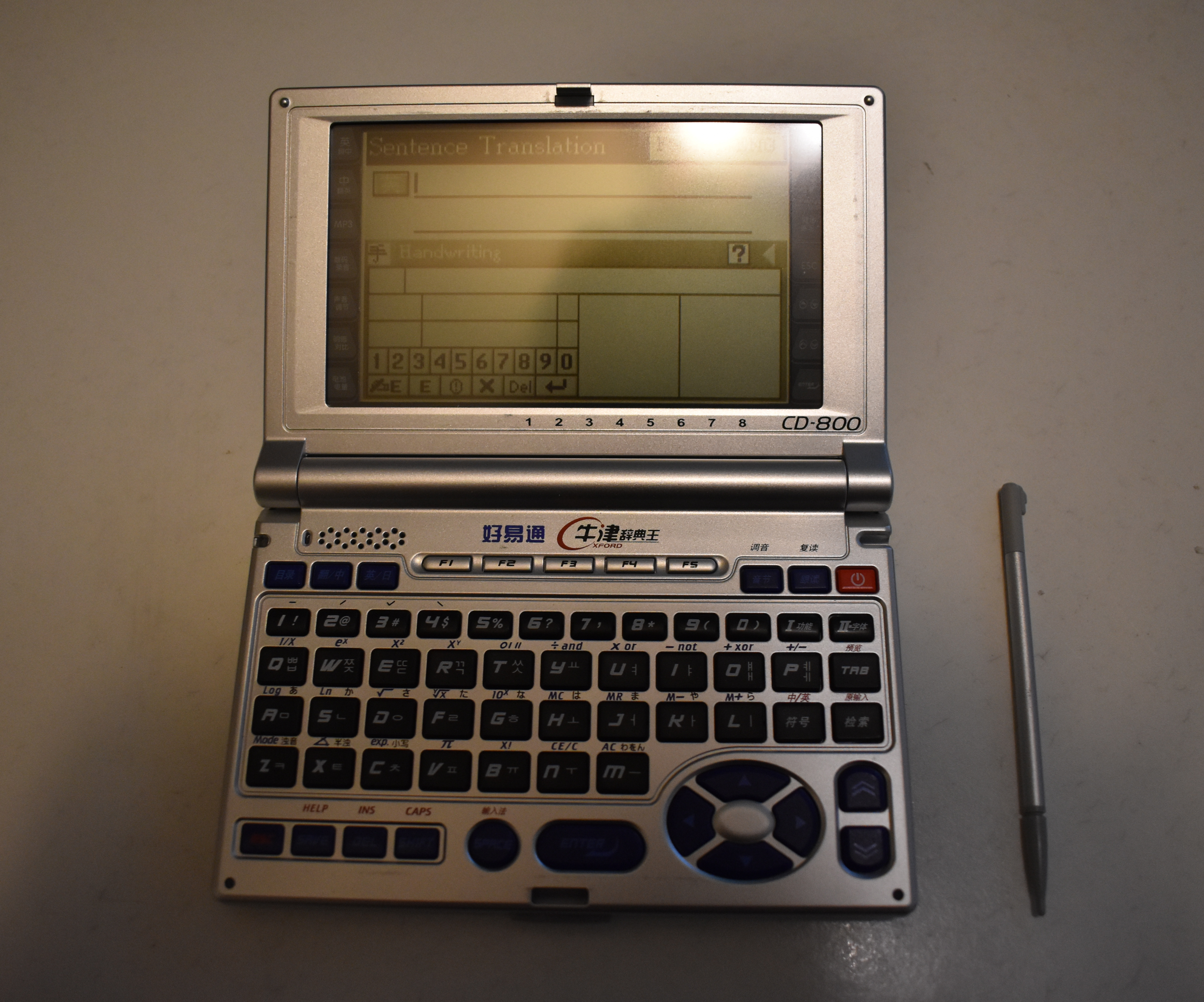
A Besta CD-800.

BESTA is an independent subsidiary company of the Inventec Group first launched in Taipei in 1989 to produce compact English/Chinese electronic dictionaries. BESTA has expanded its product line to PDAs, tablet computers and translators in multiple languages (including Korean and Japanese).

BESTA currently produces over 30 models on the market in Taiwan, China, Thailand, Malaysia, Indonesia, and Singapore. The Thai distributor CyberDict offers customized products with additional Thai dictionaries.

BESTA also manufactures a line of language products designed specifically for the North American market, where it has become the leading provider of English/Chinese and English/Korean electronic dictionaries. In the US, BESTA products are sold under the BESTA (Chinese) or OPTIMEC (South Korean) labels and are exclusively distributed and serviced by Moy Sam Corporation (New York) and Maxmile Corporation (Los Angeles). In Canada, BESTA products are found in Toronto and Markham.

Several BESTA models come with slots for inserting SD/MMC data cards containing additional specialized dictionaries (such as medical or business). It has been ranked in 1st place for "Taiwan's Ideal Electronic Dictionary Brand" for twelve consecutive years. Inventec Besta became a listed company in Taiwan Stock Exchange in 2007.

=== History ===
==== 1989 ====
Inventec Besta Co., Ltd was founded.

==== 1999 ====
Merged with the Inventec's References System Division, Lin Kou Factory, and Inventec (Xi'an) Company

==== 2000 ====
Acquired Golden Atom Holdings Ltd. and invested in Besta Technology (HK) Co., Ltd.and Besta Technology (China) Co., Ltd

== See also ==
- List of companies of Taiwan
