= Fred Chan =

Malaysian actor (born 1987)

- Born: 12 February 1987 (age 39); Penang, Malaysia
- Education: University of Malaya, Northern University of Malaysia
- Occupation: Actor
- Years active: 2019–present

Fred Chan (Chinese name: 曾永凭) is a Malaysian film and stage actor. He made his acting debut in 2019, appeared in stage productions in 2022, and played the lead role in the Malaysian crowdfunded film Pendatang in 2023. The film has accumulated more than 5 million views to date. He has also appeared in Bollywood film Jigra in 2024, and later gained wider attention for his performance in 120 Bahadur (2025) as the principal antagonist. He is the first Malaysian who appear in a Bollywood movie poster.

== Career ==
Chan actively participates in drama and acting classes, performed in several stage productions since 2022, and played the lead role of the dad in indie movie Pendatang in 2023. In addition to his roles in Bollywood movies, Jigra (2024) and 120 Bahadur (2025), he has also appeared in Singaporean productions such as Titoudao and Emerald Hill – The Little Nyonya Story. He starred in several TV commercials including IKEA: The Capables, Guardian, Petron CNY 2024 etc.

== Filmography ==
=== Film ===
Year	Title	Role	Notes
2019	Lucky Blockchain	Bai Song Min	
2021	Le Dream	Chen Jing Fang	
2023	Pendatang	Wong	Crowdfunded non-profit project
2023	The Chosen One	Headless (Japanese Captain)	Singapore movie
2023	Jigra	Detective2	Bollywood movie
2024	A Place Called Silence	Counseling Teacher	China movie
2024	The Fox King	Davi	
2024	120 Bahadur	Captain Aimer	Bollywood movie

=== Theater ===
Year	Title	Role
2022	Le Tabouret	Teo Beng
2022	Restart	A
2023	Exchange Theatre: Give Equity A Chance	Michael/ Andy
2023	Mama Looking For Her Cat	Children (Ensemble)
2023	The Teacher Appreciation Banquet	Chan Onn Peng
2023	Le Tabouret (extended version)	Teo Beng
2023	Little Sunshine Musical	Brother Coconut/ Multiple roles
2024	Shakespeare Demystified: Othello	Brabantio/ Montano/ Lodovico
2024	Wedding Performance	Groom
2024	Terengganu MCA dinner Musical	Ensemble
2024	The Teacher Appreciation Banquet 2.0	Chan Onn Peng
2025	Shakespeare Demystified: Othello	Brabantio/ Montano/ Lodovico
2025	Exchange Theatre: Breaking The Silence	Ian/ Sam

=== Drama & Series ===
Year	Title	Role	Notes
2019	Titoudao	Nam	Singapore drama
2020	The Ferryman: Legends Of Nanyang	Qing's father	Singapore drama
2021	Hua Hee Buddies	Rich Boy Ghost	Astro series
2022	Mama Mau Jodoh	Lim Hong Fang	RTM drama
2022	Forget Me Not	Sherlock	RTM drama
2022	Once Upon A Kopitiam	Ah Cong	Astro series
2023	The Queen's Ploy	Doctor	Astro series
2023	My One And Only	Jeff	Singapore drama
2023	Sinister: The Gate of Hell	Tan Zhi Kang (Host)	CMGO
2024	Coded Love	Mr.Ho	Singapore drama
2024	Kayangan	Matthiew Thann	Astro series
2024	Fearless	Club Manager	Hong Kong drama
2024	Emerald Hill - The Little Nyonya Story	Ah Guang	Singapore drama
2025	Fixing Fate	Guo Tian Ci	Singapore drama
2025	Love And Law	Yap Chee Keong	RTM drama
2025	She Took Everything From Me	Ryan	Do Drama
2025	Bride From The Past	Employer	Astro series
2025	End Game: Disaster Strikes	Inspector Wu	RTM drama
2025	The Leftovers	X- Ray operator	Singapore drama
2025	潮州厨娘	JB customer	Mediacorp vertical drama
2025	Highway To Somewhere	Ah Cheng	Singapore drama
2025	Live Again	Sun Hao	Vertical drama

=== Short Film ===
- 2021
  - Umpan
  - It's Ok
- 2022
  - N Room
- 2024
  - Inside The Window
  - Next CNY (Eric Lim MV)
  - Unheimlich
  - Girl Monster
- 2025
  - Escage
