= Cain (company) =

Real estate investment company

- Formerly: Cain International; Cain Hoy Enterprises
- Type: Private
- Industry: Real estate
- Founded: 2014; 12 years ago
- Area served: Worldwide
- Key people: Jonathan Goldstein (CEO and cofounder); Todd Boehly (founder)
- AUM: $16 billion (2023)
- Parent: Eldridge Industries
- Website: cainint.com

Cain (formerly Cain International) is a privately held real estate investment firm headquartered in London.

== History ==
=== Early history and founding ===
The company was co-founded by Jonathan Goldstein and Todd Boehly in 2014 as Cain Hoy Enterprises, with minority backing from Guggenheim Partners. The company's early investments were a number of mixed-use developments in the United Kingdom before expanding to hotels, restaurant, housing and entertainment developments.

The firm was in talks to buy Tottenham Hotspur F.C. in 2014, but later pulled out of negotiations. Cain's CEO Goldstein later became a director of Chelsea F.C. in 2022.

Cain Hoy entered a joint venture with Galliard Homes in 2015 to develop high rise apartments in Canary Wharf.

In 2014, Cain Hoy Enterprises loaned $167 million to SBE Entertainment Group as part of the company's recapitalization. As part of the deal, three principals from Cain Hoy joined SBE's board of directors. They later stepped down from the board in December 2014. In 2016, Cain Hoy acquired a 25% stake in SBE Entertainment as part of a joint venture to acquire Morgans Hotel Group. It exited this investment in 2018 when it sold this stake to Accor.

=== International expansion and rebranding ===
By 2016, the firm had invested over $1.4 billion in real estate development, and had begun to expand into the United States and Europe. Cain Hoy was renamed Cain International in 2017. In 2019, the company opened an office in Los Angeles and Miami.

In 2018, the company purchased a $345 million stake in The Beverly Hilton and Waldorf-Astoria Beverly Hills as part of a joint venture with Israeli hotelier Beny Alagem. In 2021, the partnership received approval from the city council to begin construction on One Beverly Hills, a mixed-use development spanning 17.5 acres that includes the Beverly Hilton, the Waldorf Astoria, and a planned Aman Hotel, Residences & Club. As of January 2024, site preparation was underway for the construction of the development. In February 2024, the groundbreaking of the site was celebrated with officials from the City of Beverly Hills.

Since 2018, Cain has developed a number of skyscrapers in Miami, including the Una Residences, Missoni Baia and 830 Brickell Tower, one of the tallest buildings in Miami. Cain also contributed $284.5 million towards the $1 billion renovation of the Crown Building in Manhattan.

In April 2021, Cain and OKO Group, a Miami-based real estate development firm, received a loan from Bank OZK to a construct the Missoni Baia tower in South Brickell, Miami. The Missoni Baia tower was topped off in June 2021. Cain and OKO Group also entered a joint venture to build One River, a highrise apartment in Fort Lauderdale.

In December 2020, the company acquired restaurant chain Prezzo. It also invested in the Raffles Boston Back Bay Hotel & Residences, which was topped-out in March 2022. The company has also invested in mini golf chain Swingers, and led a $52 million investment round in 2023.

Cain raised €324 million for its first European real estate fund, with backing from Goldman Sachs and Security Benefit Life Insurance Company. The fund closed in May 2021. Cain acquired a commercial site in Dublin, alongside Kennedy Wilson, in December 2018. Development of the site began in 2019 and is due for completion in two phases by 2023 and 2024.

The company provided a $117 million loan to Lendlease in November 2021 to finance the construction of The Reed, a development project in the Chicago Loop.

In 2023, Cain completed a £500 million funding deal with Menora Mivtachim Group to develop five student housing developments in Leeds, York, Liverpool, Nottingham and Manchester.

The company purchased Firethorn Trust's UK logistics portfolio for £550 million in March 2022. In April 2022, Blackstone Inc provided Cain with £420 million in financing to develop the portfolio acquired in 2021. Development was finalized in December 2023, with the completion of Sherburn42. Firethorn and Cain later partnered to develop a 17-acre property in Southall.

In May 2022, the company agreed to loan £261.5 million to Shinfield Studios for the construction of a 1 million sq. ft. production facility. Once completed, the facility will be one of the largest film and television production studios in the United Kingdom. The company has also developed Islington Square, in London.

In 2022, the company and the Public Investment Fund of Saudi Arabia invested $900 million into Aman Group, to support the hospitality group's international expansion. The investment brought the group's valuation to $3 billion.

In 2023, Cain announced plans to renovate the Delano South Beach hotel in Miami, which its parent Eldridge had acquired in 2020, through a partnership with Ennismore which saw Cain acquire a minority stake in the Delano brand. Cain is one of the developers of The Stage, Shoreditch. Cain also appointed Bompas & Parr to develop a 19,000 sq. ft. Museum of Shakespeare at The Stage in collaboration with Museum of London Archaeology and Historic England. The museum is expected to open in early 2024. In January 2024, Cain received a £188 million refinancing for The Stage from Macquarie Capital.

The company purchased ten construction loans from PacWest Bancorp, including $500 million of loans for the construction of student housing and multifamily residential developments in New York, in June 2023. This brought the amount of debt originated by the company to over $8 billion. That year, it also extended a $58 million credit facility to Tungsten Properties.

In November 2023, Cain extended a $240 million loan to Related Companies and Alta Developers for the construction of Casa Bella Residences, an apartment tower by B&B Italia. It also provided $47.3 million in funding to real estate firms Sumaida, Khurana and Bizzi, & Bilgili for the construction of The Fifth Miami Beach, an office tower in the South of Fifth neighbourhood designed by architect Alberto Campo Baeza.

In 2025, Cain International was renamed Cain.
