= Packard Bell Corner Computer =

Personal computer made in the 1990s

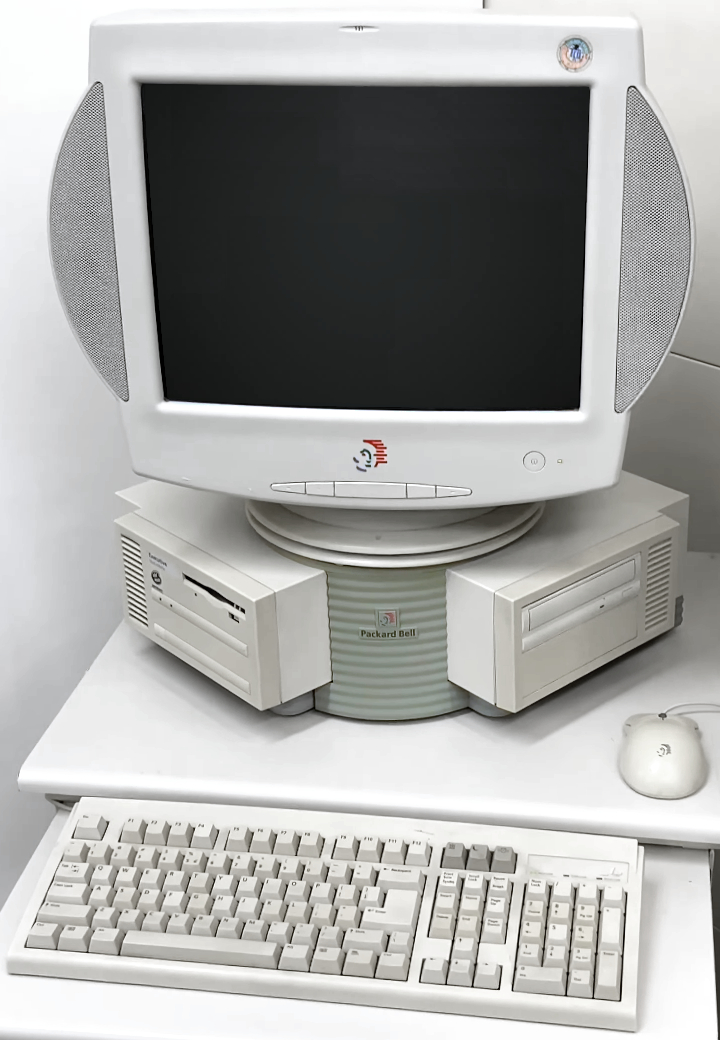
- Manufacturer: Packard Bell
- Type: Home Computer
- Released: 1995; 31 years ago
- Introductory price: US$1,299 (equivalent to $2,681 in 2024) (without monitor)
- Discontinued: 1997; 29 years ago
- Operating system: Windows 95
- CPU: Intel Pentium 75 MHz
- Memory: 8MB RAM
- Storage: 820MB
- Display: Cathode ray tube Monitor/TV
- Graphics: S3 Trio64
- Sound: Aztech Sound Galaxy

Packard Bell Corner Computer was the popular name given to the models in the Executive Multi-Media range manufactured by Packard Bell in the mid-1990s, with a distinctive casing designed by the consultancy firm Frog Design to be placed in a corner. This breaks with the usual trend of rectangular beige towers.

They were originally marketed together with an infrared remote control so that they could be used as a multimedia centre.

However, despite the distinctive design of its casing, some critics focused on the fact that the cables and slots were located at the rear, preventing it from being placed perfectly in a corner, as it was necessary to leave a space or the position of the floppy drive and CD reader on the sides, preventing front use.

The pre-installed software included Windows 95 as the operating system, along with Packard Bell Navigator, a program manager that sought to compete with Microsoft Bob.

== Bibliography ==
- Windows Panoráma, 1997 Computer Panoráma Kiadói Kft Internet Archive
- Power Unlimited - Jaargang 3, 1995, VNU Media Internet Archive
- "Packard Bell introduces PC with remote control function", page 44, July 11, 1995, Tampa Bay Times tampabay.newspapers
- Packard Bell PCs Add Another Remote to Pile, page 133, July 11, 1995, The Los Angeles Times latimes.newspapers
