= Jonathan Goldstein (businessman) =

British solicitor and entrepreneur

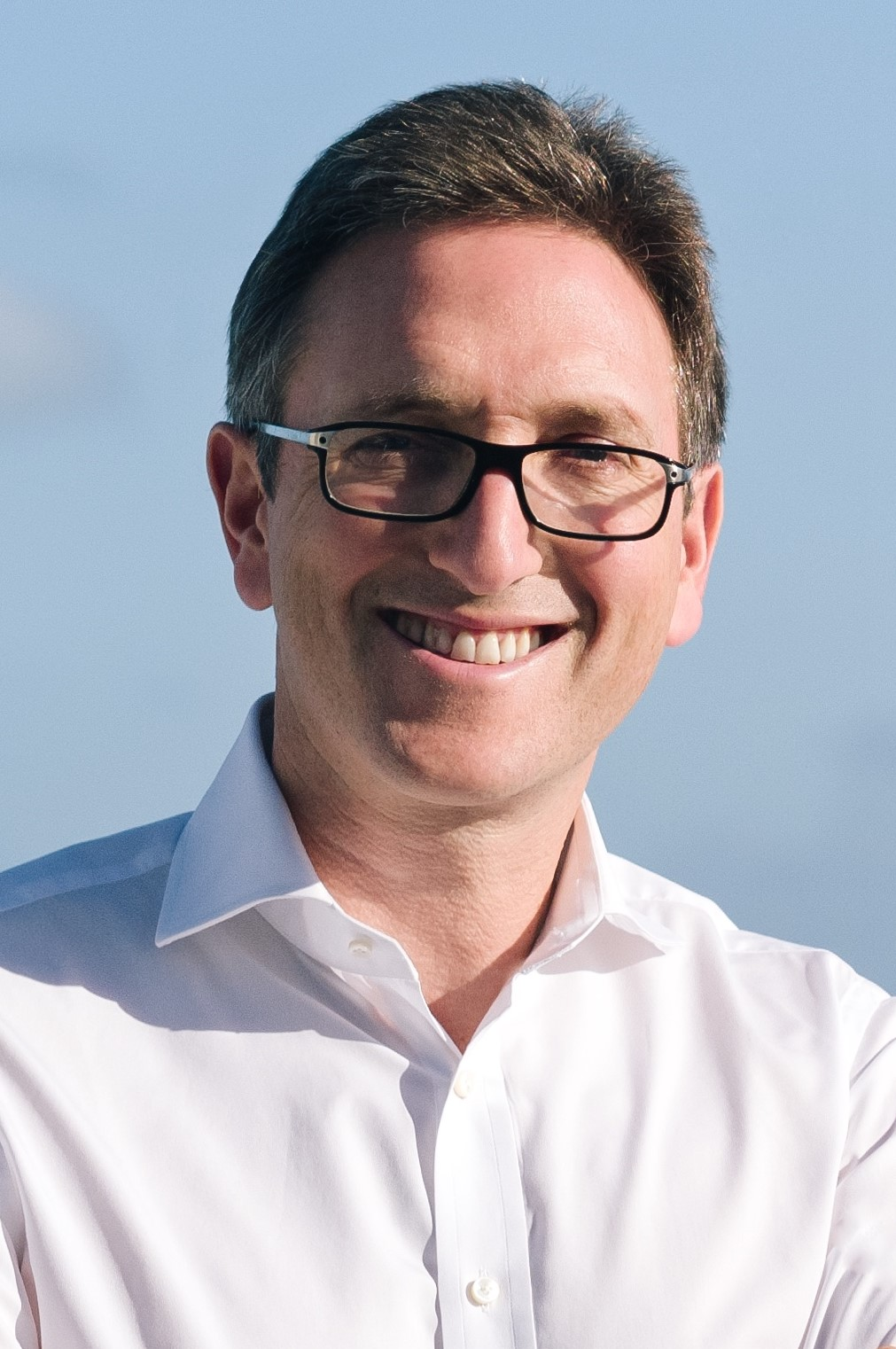
- Born: 1965 or 1966 (age 59–60); London, England
- Education: University of Manchester
- Occupations: Solicitor and entrepreneur
- Known for: CEO and cofounder of Cain; Former co-owner and director of Chelsea
- Children: 4

Jonathan Goldstein (born 1965 or 1966) is a British solicitor and entrepreneur. He is co-founder and CEO of the multinational investment firm Cain.

== Early life and education ==
Born in London, Goldstein attended Ilford County High School and later graduated from the University of Manchester with a degree in law in 1987.

== Career ==
=== Early career ===
Following law school, he joined London-based multinational law firm SJ Berwin. In 1992, Goldstein joined Olswang LLP, where, according to firm founder Simon Olswang, writing in 2016; he gained prominence as a "wunderkind", becoming a partner at age 28, and then the youngest CEO of a London law firm at age 32. Goldstein led the firm's rapid growth and global expansion. Olswang was then referenced as "the hippest law firm in town" and was awarded "Law Firm of the Year", several times, by Chambers and Partners, during Goldstein's tenure.

=== Guggenheim, Ronson and Heron ===
After 15 years at Olswang, in 2007, he then joined Gerald Ronson's property company, Heron International, as managing director, later becoming deputy CEO. In 2010, Ronson Capital Partners was founded, and Goldstein was appointed CEO. In 2013, he was appointed the inaugural head of European real estate and direct investments for global investment firm Guggenheim Partners.

=== Cain ===
In 2014, Goldstein co-founded Cain Hoy Enterprises with two other Guggenheim Partners alumni, Henry Silverman and Eldridge Industries chair Todd Boehly, with minority backing from Guggenheim Partners. The firm rebranded to Cain International in 2017 and, by 2023, had over $16 billion in assets under management across Europe and the United States. The firm has invested in real estate throughout the United Kingdom, Europe and the United States. Its first European real estate investment fund raised over €324 million.

The company is an investor in hospitality brands such as Aman Group, Delano and the Beverly Hilton. The company is developing One Beverly Hills, a 17.5-acre site that will include the Beverly Hilton, the Waldorf Astoria and a planned Aman Hotel, Residences & Club. Once completed, a pair of One Beverly Hills' residential towers will be the tallest buildings in Beverly Hills. Cain also invested in the renovation of the Crown Building and construction of the Aman New York hotel on its upper floors.

Cain has invested heavily in South Florida real estate, constructing high rise towers in Miami like the Missoni Baia, 830 Brickell and renovating the Delano Hotel. It has also provided loans to real estate firms such as Related Group, Alta Developers, Sumaida + Khurana, and Bizzi + Bilgili for the development of Miami real estate. The company has also acquired the Prezzo restaurant chain and has invested in brands such as Swinger's mini golf chain.

Cain purchased Firethorn Trust's UK logistics portfolio for £550 million in 2022, receiving £420 million in financing from Blackstone to develop it.

Cain is developing a mixed-use development at The Stage, Shoreditch which will include commercial space, and a Museum of Shakespeare made in collaboration with the Museum of London Archaeology and Historic England. In 2022, Cain loaned £261.5 million to Shinfield Studios for the construction of a 1 million sq. ft. production facility near Reading, Berkshire.

Between 2022 and 2023, the company formed partnerships to develop student housing in London, Portsmouth, Liverpool, Manchester, Nottingham, Birmingham, Leeds and York.

As of 2023, the company had originated over $8 billion in global debt following the acquisition of $1.2 billion in construction loans from PacWest Bancorp.

=== Chelsea ===
In 2022, Goldstein was part of a consortium of buyers who acquired Chelsea from billionaire Roman Abramovich. The deal was finalized on May 30, 2022, and Goldstein became a director of Chelsea. In October 2022, Goldstein stated that Chelsea's ownership were looking to maximize the team's potential, and were in the early stages of planning to redevelop Stamford Bridge.

== Personal life and affiliations ==
Goldstein was elected chair of the Jewish Leadership Council in May 2017, for which he has been a vocal spokesman, and a critic of Labour leader Jeremy Corbyn, in media and while addressing a rally outside of Parliament, in March 2018.

He chairs the Trust of the Chief Rabbi of the United Hebrew Congregations of the Commonwealth. He is also a trustee of The Gerald & Gail Ronson Family Foundation.

Goldstein is married with four children. He resides in North West London, he is also co-president of Camp Simcha, a non-profit organization that provides practical and emotional support to Jewish families where there is serious childhood illness. Goldstein was chair of the Jewish Leadership Council from 2017 to 2021. He is also a former vice chairman of Jewish Care, and oversaw development on King Solomon High School and Ilford Jewish Primary School. His maternal grandfather was a founder of Ilford United Synagogue.
