= Reveal Computer Products =

American computer peripheral manufacturer

Reveal Computer Products, Inc.
- Type: Private
- Industry: Computer
- Founded: 1992; 34 years ago in Woodland Hills, California, United States
- Founders: Beny Alagem; Alex Sandel; Jason Barzilay
- Defunct: October 6, 1996; 30 years ago
- Fate: Bankruptcy
- Products: Peripherals
- Number of employees: 300 (1996, peak)
- Parent: Packard Bell Electronics

Reveal Computer Products, Inc., was an American computer peripheral manufacturer active from 1992 to 1996. It was established as a subsidiary of Packard Bell Electronics, an American computer company. The company was once a major player in the IBM PC peripheral market, with annual sales peaking above the US$200 million mark. It went bankrupt in 1996 after an aborted $65-million merger with Creative Technology.

== History ==
The three founders of Packard Bell Electronics—Beny Alagem, Alex Sandel, and Jason Barzilay—established Reveal Computer Products as a subsidiary of the company in 1992. Reveal was headquartered in Woodland Hills, California; they launched their first products to retailers in late 1992. The company in its early years manufactured chiefly multimedia upgrade kits for IBM PCs and compatibles, including video cards and sound cards. In June 1994 the company revealed their Quantum upgrade kit, which included a sound card featuring an Ensoniq Soundscape wavetable synthesis chip, a Panasonic-manufactured CD-ROM drive, stereo speakers, a microphone headset, a joystick, and 35 pack-in video game titles. This kit sold well and was received warmly in the computer press, earning an Editors' Choice reward in PC Magazine.

In early 1995, Reveal began broadening their product lineup, offering in addition to their kits tape backup drives, modems, and standalone CD-ROM drives and joysticks. The company's standalone CDQ series of CD-ROM drives were sourced from LG Electronics; Reveal had ordered one million units from LG for US$150 million in March 1995. Reveal's higher-end modems, such as the Decathlon, combined functionality with their sound cards, adding wavetable synthesis for audio playback on top of network connectivity.

In October 1995, Creative Technology of Singapore announced their intent to acquire Reveal from the founding trio for US$65 million in a stock swap. Had the deal gone through, Reveal would have retained its brand identity as a subsidiary of Creative; analysts suspected that Alagem and company would have infused the earnings from the stock swap right back into Packard Bell, which despite its status as one of the best selling computer brands in the United States had been cash-poor around this time. However, in November 1995 Creative abruptly pulled out of the deal, citing negative responses from shareholders on the amount of debt involved in the transaction and potential strain on Creative's management team. Insiders also suspected that Reveal had not been forthright with their own debt and profit margins until late in the acquisition talks.

Following the botched acquisition, conditions at Reveal slowly deteriorated. The company halted sales of new products in June 1996; meanwhile, the company ceased answering technical support calls on their hotline and bulletin board system, leading to enraged customers leaving negative feedback on online forums and on Usenet. Employment at Reveal dropped to just 30 workers by August 1996, down from 300 in January that year. Industry analysts suspected that this massive streamlining of the company was undertaken to avoid Reveal's bankruptcy, in order for Reveal's creditors to recover the most capital possible. By fall 1996, almost all of the company's employees had been fired, and on October 6, 1996, the company filed Chapter 7 bankruptcy, effectively dissolving Reveal.
