= Jonathan Goldstein =

Jonathan Goldstein may refer to:

- Jonathan Goldstein (author) (born 1969), North American author and radio producer
- Jonathan Goldstein (actor) (born 1964), American actor
- Jonathan Goldstein (businessman), a British solicitor and entrepreneur
- Jonathan Goldstein (composer) (1968–2019), British composer of music for film and television
- Jonathan Goldstein (filmmaker) (born 1968), American filmmaker
- Jonathan A. Goldstein (1929–2004), biblical scholar and author
- Jonathan L. Goldstein (born 1941), U.S. Attorney for the District of New Jersey from 1974 to 1977
- Johnny Goldstein (born 1991), Israeli music producer, singer and member of Israeli band TYP

== See also ==
- Jonathan Goldman, American musician
- Jonathan Goldsmith (born 1938), American actor
