= At Ease =

Computer software

- At Ease 2.0 workspace on System 7
- Developer: Apple Computer
- Stable release: 5.0.2 / 1998; 28 years ago
- Operating system: System 7.1 — Mac OS 8.5
- Type: File browser/Desktop environment
- License: Proprietary

At Ease was an alternative to the Macintosh desktop developed by Apple Computer in the early 1990s for the classic Mac OS. It provided a simple environment for new Macintosh users and young children to help them to work without supervision. At Ease replaces the Finder desktop, providing a simple tabbed panel-oriented graphical user interface in which applications and documents are represented by icons on large buttons. Aside from its security features, its interface and basic functionality is very similar to the Packard Bell Navigator.

== Features ==
- Panels: at the main At Ease desktop, there are two "panels" which are accessed with tab buttons. One displays the user's applications and one displays their personal documents. When a panel is full, another is created and the user must change the current page.
- Multiple users: at the time At Ease was released, System 7 did not support multiple users. At Ease 2.0 and later provided an easy and safe way for Macintosh users to store personal files on their computer and protect them from other people using the same computer.
- Sharing: At Ease allows files to be shared with other users.
- Privileges: the main user (known as the "Administrator" or "Owner") can set what programs and documents the user has access to.
- Security: At Ease allowed passwords to be set for each user, to make sure that one user could not log on to another user's account.

== At Ease for Workgroups ==
At Ease for Workgroups allows users to log on to a server from any workstation that has the At Ease software installed. At Ease for Workgroups introduced a number of network-specific features not found in the original At Ease. The workgroup version enabled client configuration, network access and restrictions on how the client's computer can be used. In addition to the beige-colored Applications "folder" and the blue-colored Documents "folder" that each user had in his or her workspace, the workgroup version of the software also allowed for easier access to removable media: a pink-colored folder would appear in the user's profile for any CD-ROM inserted into the computer and a green-colored folder would appear for a floppy disk. These features were controlled for each user by the administrator. At Ease for Workgroups also included an Administration program to add users and workgroups to the network.

At Ease for Workgroups 5 also provided a restricted Finder mode that allowed the Finder to operate instead of the traditional At Ease panels. It provided quick access to the user's documents folder which could be stored on an AppleShare IP server. The restricted Finder mode later evolved into Mac OS 9's multiple users feature.

Starting with version 4.0, At Ease was sold as part of the Apple Network Administrator Toolkit (ANAT), which additionally included Apple Network Assistant and Apple User and Group Manager.

== Features brought into Mac OS 9 ==
Built-in support for multiple users was implemented in Mac OS 9, bringing all of the features straight into the Mac OS and thus eliminating the need to install and use a different environment.

Even though At Ease was discontinued, certain aspects of its user interface appear in later versions of Mac OS. Its influence upon iOS, Apple's operating system for iPhone and iPad devices, has been noted. There is also a similarity to the Launcher control panel in Mac OS 7 and 8. In macOS, the Simple Finder is very similar to the idea of At Ease.

== See also ==
- Microsoft Bob
- Launchpad (macOS)
