= PB286LP =

Packard Bell laptop computer

- Developer: Packard Bell
- Manufacturer: Packard Bell (motherboard)
- Type: Laptop
- Released: 1988
- Lifespan: 1989–1991
- CPU: 80C286 at 12 MHz
- Memory: 1–5 MB
- Display: Monochrome passive-matrix LCD
- Graphics: Color Graphics Adapter; Video Graphics Array (PB286LP-VGA)
- Power: 16.5 V center positive
- Dimensions: 3.2 by 12.8 by 13.5 inches (8.1 cm × 32.5 cm × 34.3 cm)
- Weight: 16 pounds (7.3 kg)

The PB286LP, released in 1988, was Packard Bell's first laptop computer. The laptop featured an 80C286 processor clocked at 12 MHz and 1 MB of RAM, along with a single ISA expansion slot. Packard Bell released the PB286LP among a slew of products aimed at the corporate market. Technology writers gave it mostly positive reviews, although some noted its 16-lb weight as hefty and its monochrome LCD as somewhat flawed. Originally only capable of CGA-mode graphics, the laptop was updated in 1990 to support VGA. Packard Bell discontinued the PB286LP in 1991, in favor of more-compact, notebook-sized computers.

== Development and specifications ==
The PB286LP was the first laptop of Packard Bell, a defunct trademark of Teledyne Technologies revived as a computer manufacturer by Beny Alagem, Alex Sandel and Jason Barzilay in 1986. The laptop was announced in November 1988 amid a barrage of computers aimed at the corporate market. The PB286LP, which features an 80C286 processor clocked at 12 MHz—downclockable to 6 MHz—was marketed to existing buyers of 80286-based personal computers. It arrived stock with 1 MB of RAM SIMMs, expandable up to 5 MB. Packard Bell included a single full-length ISA expansion slot to offer users a means of expanding and upgrading the laptop. The laptop carries a 1.44 MB floppy disk drive and was optioned with either a 20 MB or a 40 MB hard disk drive. Conner and TEAC manufactured the hard and floppy drives respectively. In addition the PB286LP had an optional 2400-bit/s modem.

The systems chipset of the PB286LP was manufactured by Intel, while the BIOS was provided by Award. The PB286LP's video chipset was designed in-house by Packard Bell and has an interface eight bits wide and support for both double-scan CGA and MDA. The laptop's monochrome LCD measures 9.7 inches diagonally with an aspect ratio of 1.6:1. Its removable nickel–cadmium battery had a claimed battery life of three hours in 1990. Packard Bell allowed users to enable a battery-conservation feature that turns off the laptop's LCD and spins down the hard disk drive after several minutes without use.

The laptop's dimensions measured 3.2 in by 12.8 in by 13.5 in (height, width and depth). Its nominal weight on announcement was originally under 15 lb, later 7 lb. However, after production, the laptop had grown to between 16 and 18 lb— in one reviewer's write-up, the laptop weighed 20 lb. The Ni-Cd battery takes up roughly 3.5 lb of the weight.

In April 1990, the laptop received an update in the form of the PB286LP-VGA, bumping the stock RAM from 1 MB to 2 MB and adding VGA support to its video chipset. Both the PB286LP and PB286LP-VGA were manufactured in Taiwan.

== Reception ==
Reviewers of the PB286LP frequently noted its heft; Bruce Brown of PC Magazine called it "on the high side" for a clamshell laptop in its processor class but wrote that its long battery life warranted it. He found it a strong contender for a 286 laptop and called its LCD "exceptionally clear" and "terrific for text", albeit with occasional flickering in graphical modes. Brown liked the keyboard but found reservation with the lack of an unshifted asterisk key, making for "minor aggregation" for "heavy file manipulators". In several benchmarks measuring the speed of the laptop's memory chips, the speed of its hard disks and its processor's ability to perform floating point and non–floating point computations, the PB286LP gave middle-of-the-road results compared to 34 other 286-based laptops. Despite this, Brown rated the laptop "a good bet" for buyers seeking a long battery life while not needing advanced graphical capability.

John Diebold of PC World called the PB286LP "a nice little generic laptop" with "OK performance" and an "impressive battery life". He found the quality of Packard Bell's support line unreliable, on the other hand, with him and his editors at PC World unable to so much as leave a message in their computerized answering machine. In a comparison between the PB286LP and lunchbox computer by Semi-Tech Microsystems, Gene Wilburn of Computing Canada found that he preferred the latter despite its lack of a battery and slower 10 MHz processor because of STM's inclusion of a plasma display and a more standard keyboard.

In Personal Computing, reviewer Christopher O'Malley wrote that, in stark contrast with Packard Bell's other offerings, the PB286LP was "fast and fashionable", performing as well as or even better than its contemporaries in its processor class, such as Toshiba's T1600 or Compaq's SLT/286. O'Malley discovered that its battery could last up to approximately four hours in an average use case scenario and rated the machine overall an "exceptionally good buy" when considering that its street price of around US$2,500 was $1,000 less than comparable laptops. Unlike Brown, the reviewer called the PB286LP's display a letdown because of its lack of VGA comparability and "persistent ghosting ... and an occasional case of the shakes". O'Malley criticized the laptop's dearth of accessories and single ISA slot and decried the lack of upgrade path to a 40 MB hard drive for purchasers of the 20 MB version of the laptop. O'Malley also found its keyboard somewhat cramped. In conclusion, however, he wrote that, "as it is, the Packard Bell offers an impressive mix of price and performance", and while not "the state-of-the-art machine that the SLT/286 and ProSpeed 286 are", "it may be the best full-featured 286 laptop you'll find for less than $3,000".

Eva J. Blinder of Home Office Computing gave the follow-up PB286LP-VGA three stars out of four, liking the keyboard's tactility and calling the LCD "reasonably readable". She kept it from earning a perfect score for several unspecified design flaws, however.

== Legacy ==
The laptop was succeeded by the PB286NB, a much more compact notebook computer that weighed only six pounds, in November 1990. The PB286LP line was discontinued the following year.

== See also ==
- Packard Bell Statesman
