= Prezzo Holdings =

Chain restaurant operator in the United Kingdom

Prz Realisations (2) Limited
- Formerly: Papa Bidco Limited (2014–2015); Prezzo Holdings Limited (2015–2021)
- Company type: Private
- Industry: Restaurant
- Founded: 4 February 2000; 26 years ago
- Defunct: 15 May 2023
- Headquarters: Woodford Green, Essex, United Kingdom
- Key people: Jon Hendry Pickup (CEO)
- Parent: TPG Capital
- Subsidiaries: Chimichanga; Cafe Uno; Prezzo; Cleaver; MEXIco
- Website: prezzo.co.uk

Prz Realisations (2) Limited is a chain restaurant operator in the United Kingdom.

== History ==
In 2014 the company was bought by private equity investment firm TPG Capital for just over £300 million.

On 23 March 2018 Prezzo Holdings announced it was closing the 33 branch Tex-Mex chain Chimichanga, and closing 92 branches of the Prezzo chain, in a company voluntary arrangement (CVA) restructuring whereby rents at 57 other sites were to be reduced by between 25% and 50%. The contraction jeopardised up to 1,800 out of the 4,500 jobs at the time.

== Subsidiaries ==
It operates using several casual dining brands:

- Chimichanga
- Caffè Uno (previously owned by Paramount Restaurants)
- Prezzo
- Cleaver
- MEXIco
