= Packard Bell Statesman =

Economy line of notebook computers

- Manufacturer: Packard Bell Zenith Data Systems
- Type: Laptop (notebook)
- Released: October 4, 1993; 32 years ago
- Introductory price: Starting at US$1,500 (equivalent to $3,258 in 2025)
- Media: Floppy Disk
- Operating system: MS-DOS; Windows 3.1x
- CPU: Cyrix Cx486SLC @ 33/50 MHz
- Memory: 4-12 MB
- Graphics: Chips & Tech - 65520/525/530
- Input: Built-in Keyboard; J-Mouse; 1 x VGA Port; 1 x Serial port; 1 x Parallel port; 1 x PS/2 port

The Packard Bell Statesman was an economy line of notebook-sized laptops introduced in 1993 by Packard Bell. They were slower in performance and lacked features compared to most competitor products, but they were lower in price. It was created in a collaboration between Packard Bell and Zenith Data Systems. The Statesman series was essentially a rebrand of Zenith Data Systems Z-Star 433 series, with the only notable difference of the logo in the middle and text on the front bezel.

== History ==
In June 1993 Zenith Data Systems announced an alliance with Packard Bell. Zenith acquired about 20% of Packard Bell and they would both now work together to design and build PC's. Zenith would also provide Packard Bell with private-label versions of their portable PC's. The Packard Bell Statesman was a rebrand of the Zenith Z-Star notebook computer series. While the Statesman was being advertised by Packard Bell, the Z-Star series was also still being sold by Zenith.

The Statesman was first introduced on October 4, 1993. Prices started at $1,500 for a monochrome or color DSTN model with a 33 MHz Cyrix Cx486SLC, 4 MB of RAM, 200 MB hard disk drive, internal 1.44 MB floppy disk drive, and MS-DOS 6.0 with Windows 3.1 for the included software. A "J mouse" pointing device was included, similar to the TrackPoint. The Statesman was expected to begin shipping within the next few weeks.

== Specifications ==
=== Hardware ===
CPU

The first two models, the 200M and 200C, used the Cyrix Cx486SLC. This was Cyrix's first processor, which was a 386SX pin-compatible chip with on-board L1 cache and 486 instructions, being known as a "hybrid chip". The processor was clocked at 33 MHz and had 1 KB of L1 cache. It was a 16-bit processor and was pin compatible with the Intel 80386SX. On the bottom of the unit, the motherboard had an empty socket for a Cyrix FasMath co-processor, which could improve floating-point math performance.

The 200M and 200C plus models had a Cyrix Cx486SLC2 clocked at 50 MHz, which was 50% faster than the original 486SLC. The SLC2 similarly had 1 KB of on-board cache and was pin compatible with the previous model.

Graphics & Display

For video all models used three versions of the Chips & Technologies 655xx, the CT65520, 65525, and 65530. The 65520 was first introduced in early 1992 as the first controller with Super VGA resolution. It supported resolutions up to 1024x768 in 16 colors or shades of gray. If in 800x600 resolution, it can display up to 256 colors. All 3 chips were the same, with the CT65525 identifying as a CT65530. The CT65530 had an ability of 5V and 3.3V mixed operation and linear video memory addressing.

All models used a 9.5in 800x600 resolution DSTN LCD. The 200M and 200M Plus had a monochrome display, while the 200C and 200C Plus had a color display.

Audio

All models had only basic audio available, with just a piezo speaker soldered onto the motherboard and no sound controller.

Statesman proprietary RAM SIPP

Memory

Standard RAM included was 4-8 MB of EDO RAM. The RAM was on a proprietary SIPP package that could only be upgraded to 12 MB maximum if the user had compatible modules.

Storage

For storage all models used a hard drive with a size of 100 or 200 MB, and all models had an internal 1.44 MB floppy disk drive located on the side of the unit. The maximum capacity hard drive compatible if the user wanted to upgrade was 500 MB.

The J mouse along with its additional mouse control keys.

Ports & Expansion

For ports all models had 1x serial, 1x parallel, 1x VGA output, and 1x PS/2 keyboard/mouse input. For expansion all models only had one PCMCIA type II slot.

Keyboard & Mouse

All models used a small-scale keyboard with control keys. One interesting feature of the keyboard is that the J key also acted as a mouse, working similar to IBM's ThinkPad TrackPoint. On some models additional keys such as S, D, F, G and space let you do other mouse actions such as right click, left click, double click, and middle mouse click.

=== Software ===
The series shipped with MS-DOS and Windows 3.1 as the included operating system.

== Model Comparison ==
Statesman 200M — The first Statesman model, it came with a DSTN monochrome screen, and a Nickel-cadmium battery pack which could last up to 4 hours. It weighed 7.4 lb and was $1500.

Statesman 200C — The second Statesman model, it was the same as the 200M with the only notable difference of a DSTN color display rather than monochrome and a slightly decreased battery life of about 3 hours. It cost $700 more than the 200M at $2200.

Statesman 200M/200C Plus — The 200M/200C Plus were both identical to their previous base models, with the only difference of them having a Cx486SLC2 running at 50 MHz. In 1994 it cost around $2,295 for the 200C plus with 4 MB of ram, with 8 MB costing an extra $400.

	200M	200C	200M Plus	200C Plus
Display	9.5in 800x600 Monochrome DSTN	9.5in 800x600 Color DSTN	9.5in 800x600 Monochrome DSTN	9.5in 800x600 Color DSTN
CPU	Cyrix Cx486SLC - 33 MHz		Cyrix Cx486SLC2 - 50 MHz	
RAM	4-12 MB			
Video Controller	CHIPS 65520/525/530			
Audio Controller	None			
Storage	100 or 200 MB Hard Disk Drive			
Operating System	MS-DOS/Windows 3.1			
Retail price	$1500	$2200	$1599	$2295

== Reception ==
The Statesman received fair reception, with most reviewers giving positivity for the low price and high battery life, but mainly criticizing the performance and screen quality of the model line.

A review by PC World writer Rex Farrance and Owen Linderholm said the 200M had a good price, being only $1500, and a good battery life which lasted about 4 hours. In benchmarks however, the 200M performed "noticeably below the average". It was noted that the 200M's worst feature was its monochrome display, being "cloudy and a bit dim for our tastes". The J mouse was considered a decent choice, and was said to be "highly usable" after some practice. The 200M was listed as number 3 on PC World's top 20 budget PC list.

PC World also reviewed the 200C, saying the color display is only a "marginal, although an improvement on the monochrome version". The 200C placed 9 on the PC World top 20 budget PC list.

Compute! Magazine reviewed the 200C Plus in September 1994 stating it "lagged far behind the others, especially the DXs, but then speed isn't everything". It was given pros for low cost and good display, but criticized for its low performance, not having a trackball, and poor external monitor support.

== See also ==
- PB286LP, Packard Bell's first laptop
