= Prezzo (restaurant) =

British restaurant chain

Brava Trading Limited
- Trade name: Prezzo Italian
- Formerly: Prezzo Trading Limited (2021-2026)
- Type: Private
- Industry: Restaurant
- Founded: November 2000; 25 years ago
- Headquarters: Woodford Green, Greater London, United Kingdom
- Key people: Jonathan Goldstein (chairperson); James Brown (CEO)
- Revenue: ▲£59.6m GBP (FY 2011)
- Net income: ▲£7.3m GBP (FY 2011)
- Parent: Prezzo Holdings (Cain)
- Website: prezzo.co.uk

Brava Trading Limited, trading as Prezzo Italian ("price" in Italian), is a restaurant chain serving mostly Italian cuisine in the United Kingdom and Ireland. The first restaurant opened on New Oxford Street, London in November 2000. As of January 2019, there were more than 180 branches across the country, following many closures in 2018. It is part of Prezzo Holdings. The chain is currently owned by Cain.

== History ==
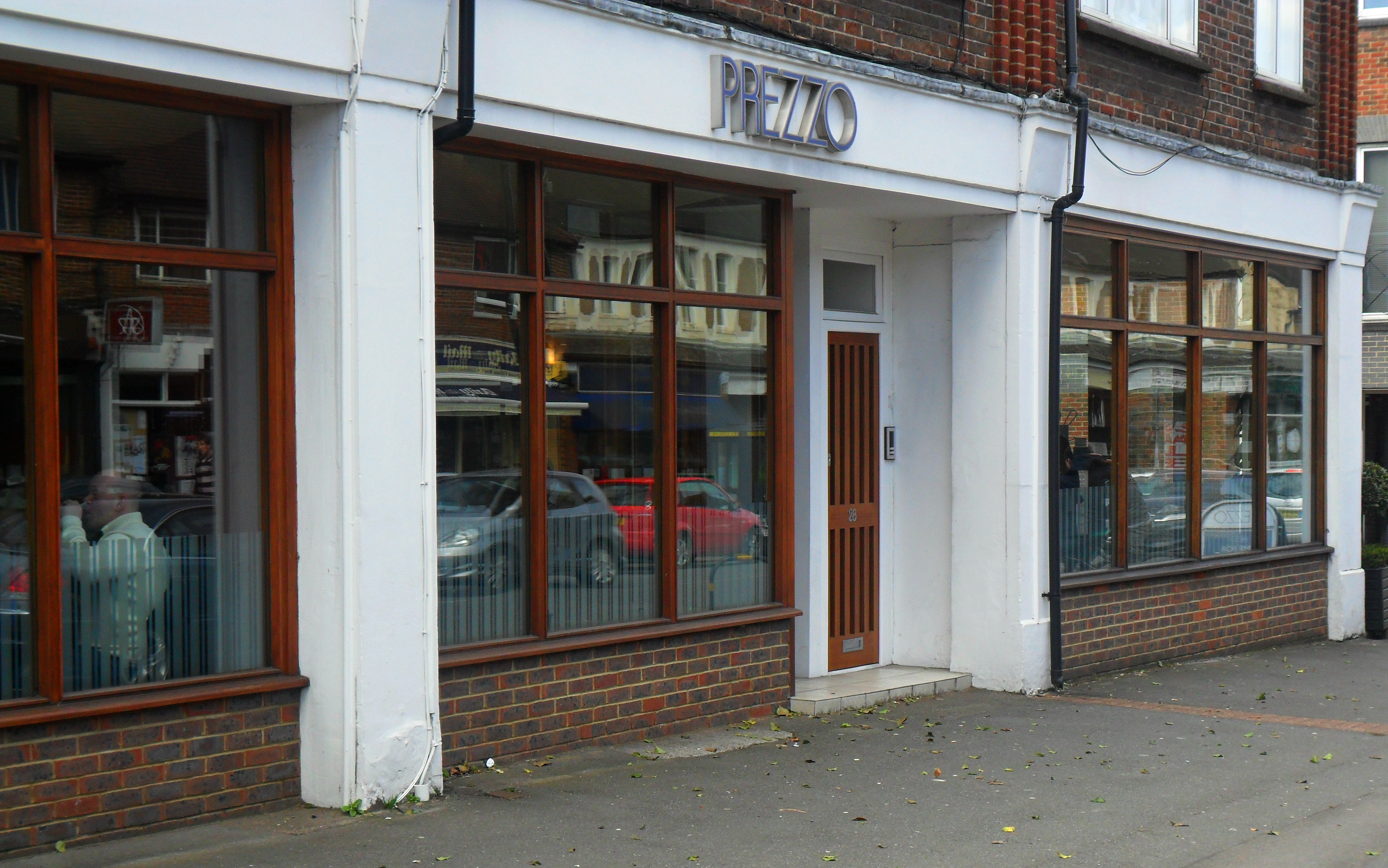
Prezzo restaurant in Cheam Village, Greater London

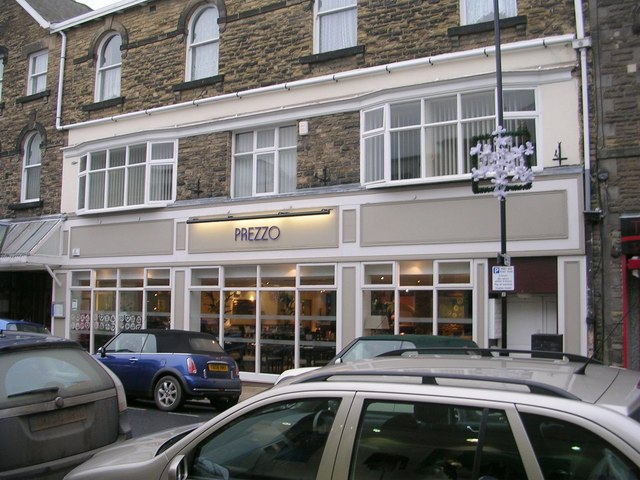
Prezzo Restaurant in Albert Street, Harrogate

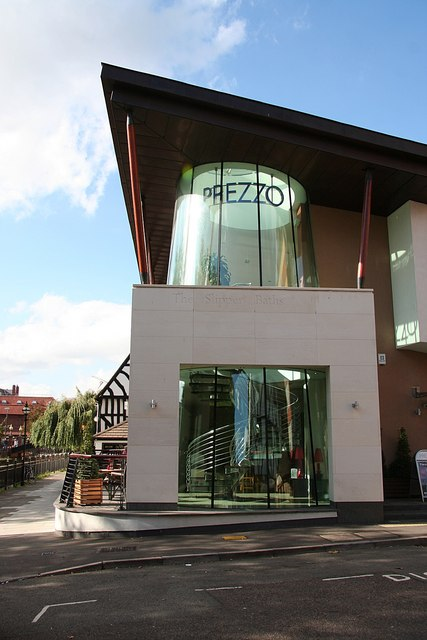
Prezzo restaurant in Lincolnshire

The first Prezzo Italian restaurant was opened in central London by Jonathan Kaye, the company's chief executive, in 2000. As of January 2019, there were more than 180 branches in the UK. Prezzo Italian opened its first restaurant in Ireland in February 2016. Prezzo commonly converts old buildings of architectural value from their old purposes into Prezzo Italian restaurants; examples include an old cinema in Beaconsfield, Buckinghamshire.

The first owner of the Prezzo Italian business was Jonathan Kaye. In 2008, Jonathan hired cousins Adam Kaye and Samuel Kaye (sons of Philip Kaye) to join Prezzo plc's board of directors. Adam and Samuel founded rival chains ASK Italian and Zizzi.

In 2011, Aldo Zilli designed four pizzas which were added to the Prezzo Italian menu under the name "V.I.Pizzas".

Private equity firm TPG took over the Prezzo Italian business in 2015 when Jonathan Kaye moved to a non-executive role. In June 2015, Dirk Eller was appointed interim chief executive. Jon Hendry-Pickup joined Prezzo as chief executive in July 2016.

In February 2018, Prezzo Italian confirmed it planned to close 100 of its 300 restaurants and secure a company voluntary arrangement as part of a rescue plan for the chain..

In April 2023, Prezzo Italian announced the closure of 46 restaurants, approximately one-third of its UK estate, The closures were part of a broader strategic review to focus on more profitable sites.

In 2025, Prezzo unveiled a refreshed menu and brand identity, renaming itself "Prezzo Italian", for the name for the first time in its history. Subsequently, in August and September 2025, the company opened new restaurants in Edinburgh and Rugby, marking its first new openings since 2020. Prezzo plans to refurbish 20 restaurants by the end of the year, with a further 40 scheduled for 2026, featuring a new design aesthetic with softer palettes, upgraded furniture, tableware, and artwork.

In 2026 a kids club subscription was launched.

== Financial history ==
In February 2006, when Prezzo Italian owned 73 restaurants, it initiated a major expansion of the business by dropping the price per share. This successfully raised £7.125 million to fund further expansion. Net cash at the half-year was £9.4 million. During the first six months of 2006 Prezzo Italian opened 12 new restaurants. In the year ending December 2006, Prezzo showed a 45% growth in turnover to £54.2m, and pre-tax profit grew from £6.1m in the previous year to £8.7m. In April 2008 Prezzo Italian saw sales grow again to £70.1m and pre-tax profit rose 25% to £13.6m.

The chain continued to grow steadily, reporting a 17% rise in profits to £7.3million (GBP) in September 2011. In 2011 the company continued to expand into new restaurant locations, reportedly aiming for a 10% increase in restaurant numbers in 2012.

== See also ==
- List of Italian restaurants
