= Packard Bell Navigator =

Alternative shell for Microsoft Windows

- Version 3.x
- Developer: Packard Bell
- Initial release: 1993
- Operating system: Windows 3.x and 95
- Platform: x86
- Type: GUI
- License: Proprietary

Packard Bell Navigator is an alternative shell for the Windows 3.1 and Windows 95 operating systems that shipped with Packard Bell computers in the mid 1990s. The shell was designed to be simpler to use for computer novices by representing applications as objects in a virtual home, similar to Microsoft Bob and At Ease. The software was originally developed by a company called Ark Interface, which was acquired by Packard Bell in 1994.

It was possible for Navigator to function on non-Packard Bell Windows PCs.

== Design and functionality ==
Most pre-1995 versions contained a GUI very similar to Apple Computer's At Ease, but without the folders. Unlike At Ease, programs were grouped in sections such as "Microsoft DOS", "Microsoft Windows", "Service & Support", and "Software". The "Software" section was the only section users could customise and modify program icons, paths, and links. The above sections appeared as icons at startup.

Navigator was a standard Windows program, meaning when the computer was booted, Windows would start and load Navigator from the startup directory. If the Windows icon in Navigator was clicked, the program would become minimized. If Navigator was removed from the Startup folder, it would not load at Windows startup. This is similar to the design of Microsoft Bob, which ran on top of Windows, and At Ease, which ran on top of the classic Mac OS Finder.

A 3D version, named Packard Bell 3D Navigator, shipped in 2000–2001.

== Security, user accounts, and passwords ==
Unlike At Ease, which allowed multiple password-protected user accounts, Navigator only allowed password protection on each of the sections (only one password). However, multiple user accounts were not possible. All users were granted the same privileges.
