= Packard Bell =

American computer company (1986–2008)

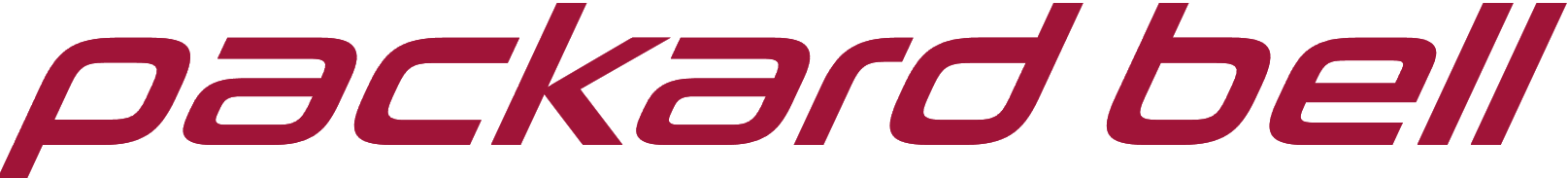
- Formerly: Packard Bell Electronics Inc. (1986–1996); Packard Bell NEC Inc. (1996–1999); NEC Computers Inc. (1999–2006); PB Holdings Co. (2006–2008)
- Type: Subsidiary
- Industry: Computer hardware
- Predecessor: Packard Bell Corporation
- Founded: 1986; 40 years ago in Chatsworth, Los Angeles, California
- Founder: Beny Alagem; Jason Barzilay; Alex Sandel
- Defunct: February 2008 (as company)
- Fate: Acquired by Acer; brand phased out in 2013 and licensed to Southern Telecom for North America in 2018 and to Universal Exports Group for the SADC region in 2019.
- Headquarters: Chatsworth, Los Angeles, California (1986–1994); Westlake Village, California (1994–1995); Sacramento, California (1995–1999); Wijchen, Netherlands (1993–2007); Nijmegen, Netherlands (2007–present)
- Area served: Worldwide
- Products: Computer hardware
- Parent: NEC (1994–2006); Acer (2006–present); Southern Telecom (2018–present; North America); Universal Exports Group (2019–present; SADC region)
- Website: Worldwide; North America; SADC region

Packard Bell is an American computer manufacturer, founded as Packard Bell Electronics Inc. in Los Angeles in 1986 by Israeli-American investors who bought the trademark rights to the historic Packard Bell Corporation from Teledyne; in spite of similarities in their names, Packard Bell has no connection to either Hewlett-Packard or Bell System.

Packard Bell helped to pioneer the mass market for PCs in the United States by selling in big office stores. In the early 1990s, the company entered the European market and opened its regional headquarters in Wijchen, Netherlands, in 1993. By this time, it had become the second largest OEM for IBM PC compatibles in the U.S. In 1996 Packard Bell was acquired by the Japanese electronics conglomerate NEC, and changed its name into Packard Bell NEC Inc. In 1999 changed its name again into NEC Computers Inc.

At the time of the merger, Packard Bell was the largest PC manufacturer in the American market having overtaken Compaq, but increasing competition and losses led to NEC stopping its North American operations by 2000, focusing squarely on European and other markets under its profitable Packard Bell Europe in the Netherlands, which later diversified to products such as portable media players. This unit became responsible for all Packard Bell and NEC operations outside of Japan and China. In 2006, NEC divested the Packard Bell division, renamed PB Holding Co., to Chinese-American entrepreneur Lap Shun Hui, and in 2008 was acquired by Taiwanese firm Acer, in the aftermath of their takeover of Gateway. Packard Bell Europe under Acer, based in Nijmegen, continued making Packard Bell products for the European, African and Middle Eastern markets until at least 2013. Southern Telecom later acquired the rights to the brand in North America and started selling PCs there in 2018. Universal Exports Group, a Hong Kong based manufacturing company, licensed the brand name from Acer in Taiwan in 2019 for the SADC region.

== History ==
=== 1986–1987: Foundation ===
The Packard Bell computer company was incorporated in Chatsworth, Los Angeles, California, in 1986 by Beny Alagem, Jason Barzilay, and Alex Sandel, three Israeli-born United States businessmen based in California. Packard Bell was previously the namesake of an American consumer electronics company founded in the 1920s, Packard Bell Electronics. The latter made a name for itself for its radios before branching out to television sets in the 1950s.

In the 1960s, as with many American consumer electronics companies, Packard Bell encountered difficulty in the marketplace due to increasing competition from Japanese companies like Sony, Sanyo, and Panasonic. In 1968, Packard Bell was acquired by Teledyne Technologies, an electronics conglomerate. Teledyne let the Packard Bell trademark languish in the following years; by the mid-1970s, it was all but retired. Alagem, fascinated by Packard Bell's history as a once-beloved consumer electronics brand, bartered Teledyne for the rights to the trademark for just under $100,000. Alagem later found that brand recognition for Packard Bell was at 70 percent, among a random sampling of adults in the United States.

Alagem and Barzilay met in the 1970s after the former had graduated from Cal Poly. Together, they founded a semiconductor distribution company. In 1983, they merged with another electronics supplier owned by Sandel to form Cal Circuit Abco, Inc., in Woodland Hills, California. Cal Circuit Abco sold computer peripherals on top of semiconductor and had generated over $500 million in annual revenues by 1985. Seeing the increasing commodification of the IBM Personal Computer standard by way of clone makers, or companies that manufactured systems which were plug- and software-compatible with the IBM PC architecture, the three businessmen decided they wanted in and reincorporated Cal Circuit Abco as Packard Bell Electronics in 1986, after Alagem had bought the Packard Bell name from Teledyne. The three leveraged their business connections with Asian electronics companies formed through Cal Circuit Abco to contract the production of an IBM PC clone. They settled on several companies, most prominently Samsung Electronics of Korea and Tatung Company of Taiwan—the former designing and manufacturing the desktop chassis and motherboards and the latter supplying their monitors.

=== 1987–1993: Market launch and early success ===
The first Packard Bell PC was released to retail in late 1986. As the hardware was largely bare-bones and derivative, the company could not market the computer based on technical merit, nor could they stand to profit from royalties on patents. Instead, the founders were forced to rely on a low price tag for the system, as well as the founders' shared knowledge of marketing and merchandising learned from their electronics vending businesses. In selling the computer it developed three core strategies: equipping its computer systems with various value-adds while selling the complete bundle at a low cost, leaning on the history of the Packard Bell name, and vending the computers at mass retailers.

U.S. PC market share by revenue, 1991
Company	% Market Share
IBM	18.6
Apple	14.0
Packard Bell	5.7
Tandy	4.1
Gateway 2000	3.6
Compaq	3.5
Everex	3.0
Toshiba	3.6

Packard Bell was the first PC clone manufacturer to have the MS-DOS operating system and various pack-in applications preinstalled onto the computers' hard drives, saving customers the hassle of formatting the hard drive with a functional file system, while providing novices basic software to get a running start on the PC paradigm. The hard drives of Packard Bell's low-end line-up of computers were larger than the competition's hard-drive-equipped offerings, at 40 MB, while sold at a lower price. Packard Bell was one of the first PC vendors to offer systems with both 3.5-inch and 5.25-inch floppy disk drives, providing a bridge to the newer 3.5-inch floppy format—the use of which in the PC world was being accelerated by IBM with their next-generation PS/2 line of personal computers.

Meanwhile, the company's first slogan—"America grew up listening to us. It still does"—was devised to appeal to the nostalgia of older buyers while imparting a sense of longevity in the company. This combined with the Packard Bell trademark's existing brand equity gave the company instant prestige, a rarity among newcomers to the PC market. The company sometimes benefited from misplaced name recognition, according to Fortune, with consumers, especially first-time computer buyers, erroneously associating the company with others of a similar name to Packard Bell, such as Hewlett-Packard, Pacific Bell, and Bell Laboratories.

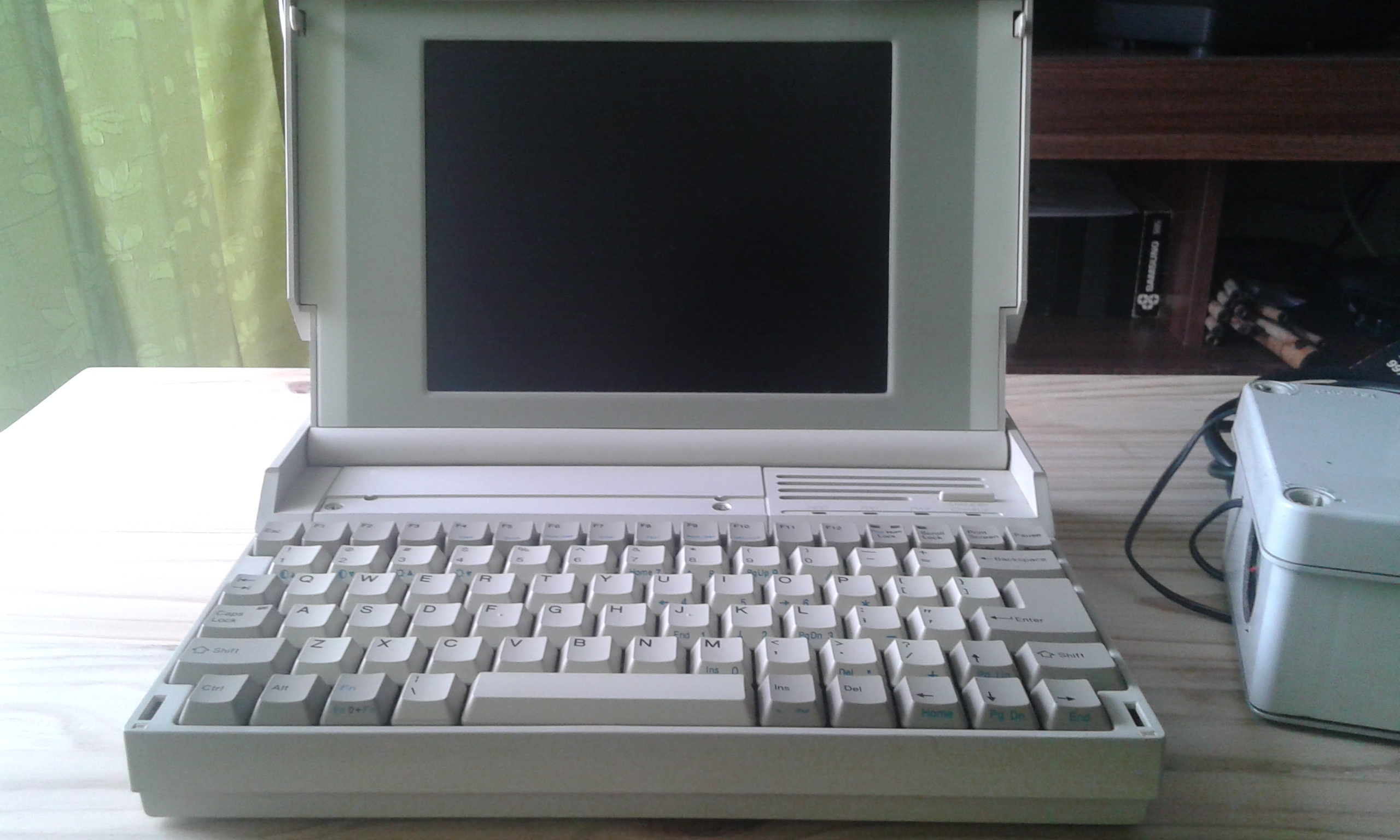
A Packard Bell laptop

Instrumental to Packard Bell's early success was its decision to distribute its systems to mass market retailers such as Sears, as well as wholesale clubs and consumer electronics stores. Packard Bell was one of the first PC clone vendors to adopt these sales channels, at a time when PCs were nearly universally sold through mail order, sales representatives, or specialized computer stores. While the established name-brand PC vendors were reluctant to sell their systems at these types of retailers in favor of cultivating lucrative service contracts with their customers, the percentage of PCs sold through mass market retailers rose threefold between 1987 and 1992—from 4 percent to 12 percent—with Packard Bell dominating within this niche. Within less than three years of the company's incorporation, Packard Bell saw an annual sales figure of US$600 million in 1989. Even amid the early 1990s recession, annual sales in 1991 grew to US$700 million. (Note: The company posted a net loss that year, however, of $1 million, according to the prospectus of its cancelled initial public offering.) Sales were helped along by Packard Bell's penetration into new markets—such as local area network systems for enterprises and CPU cards for power users—as well as the company's extensive customer support package for all customers, offering live technical support over the phone, toll-free and around the clock. Packard Bell dubbed its customer support system Infinitech, which provided prerecorded troubleshooting tips in addition to a line to staffed technical support. The company also provided Infinitech through its bulletin-board systems hosted on CompuServe and Prodigy.

Packard Bell hoped to go public and file its initial public offering in the spring or summer of 1992. Planning a 5.2-million share offering at between $13.50 and $15.50 a share, the offering would have retired the majority of the company's $93 million debt. However, Packard Bell's IPO was postponed in June amid an inclement personal computer market that saw many other computer companies pull their IPOs due to mounting competition from Compaq, Dell, and AST Research. It was eventually cancelled altogether, Packard Bell remaining a private company throughout the rest of its existence.

=== 1993–1995: Increasing market share and expansion in Europe ===
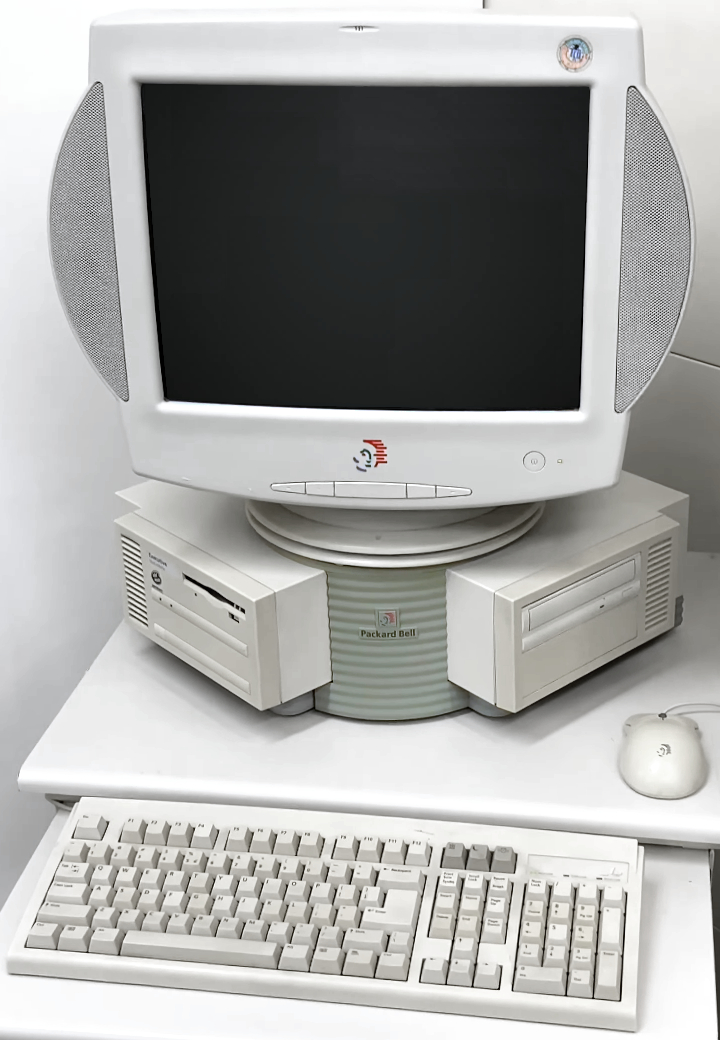
Packard Bell Corner Computer from 1995, designed by Frog

After clocking annual sales of over $900 million in 1992, Packard Bell passed the $1 billion mark in 1993, with annual sales that year of nearly $1.25 billion, at which point the company employed over 700 workers in the United States. Packard Bell's American market share among PC manufacturers likewise grew from 5.3 percent to 6.7 percent between 1992 and 1993. They were then the fourth-largest personal computer vendor in the United States, trailing IBM, Apple, and Compaq.

As other name-brand competitors began adopting Packard Bell's core strategies of bundling software and expansions, slashing prices, and selling through mass market retailers, Packard Bell responded by offering products at the high end of the market and moving into Europe, where they were beginning to make inroads. After netting $100 million in sales to Europe in 1992 (10 percent of the company's global sales), Packard Bell constructed a 75,000-square-foot (7,000 m^{2}) building in the Netherlands and hired 250 workers in the country, including a diverse remote customer service team providing technical support in 12 different languages. By 1993, Packard Bell's products were stocked in 1,500 retail locations across 13 countries, and by 1994, the company was selling 2.1 million product units per year, doubling their previous year's output.

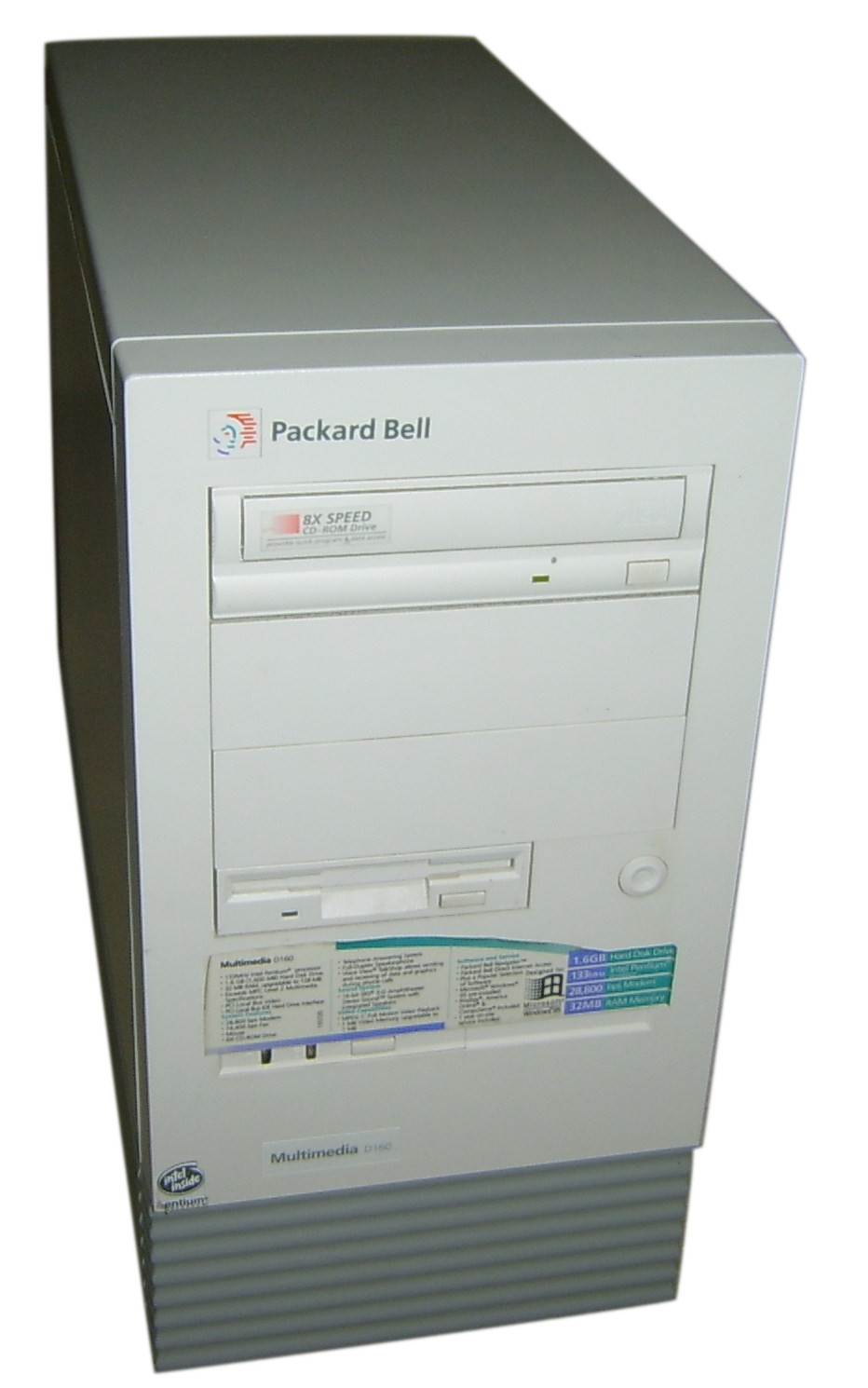
Packard Bell Multimedia D160 tower from 1996

Packard Bell's growing adoption rates into the mid-1990s were helped along by a new industrial design language and user-friendly software. In 1993, the company introduced Navigator, a shell replacement for Windows 3.1 intended for novice computer users that provides simple screens of large icons to launch their commonly used application software. In 1994, it released Navigator 2, replacing the icons with a hyper-skeuomorphic house metaphor, in which every screen of icons is within a prerendered 3D-CGI room in a house. Packard Bell acquired the software firm responsible for Navigator, Ark Interface of Seattle, Washington, in May 1994. (Note: In around 1996, Microsoft forced boot-up shells off OEM computers by updating its Microsoft Windows distribution agreement. Packard Bell subsequently discontinued Navigator in summer 1997.) That same year, Packard Bell acquired Active Imagination, Inc., of Westlake Village, California, a developer of edutainment video games for children. With this acquisition, Packard Bell made the shift toward providing standalone software packages in retail outlets for the first time.

Also in 1994, Packard Bell hired industrial design firm Frog Design, known for its work with Apple and NeXT, to redesign Packard Bell's personal computer line. They designed the cases of company's next generation of desktops with accented trim panels featuring wavy contours; these panels can be detached and replaced with ones of a different color. With these redesigned cases, Packard Bell was the first company to use a color-coding system for the external connectors on the rear of the computer, corresponding with the color of the shroud of the plugs on the devices that Packard Bell provided with its computers (e.g., purple for keyboards, teal for mice). This innovation was intended to make installation of peripherals easier and predated the PC System Design Guide standard for color-coding connectors, introduced in 1999.

Packard Bell's Chatsworth headquarters were seriously damaged in the January 1994 Northridge earthquake—the epicenter of which was located just a few blocks from their six-building complex—grinding operations to a halt and putting 1,500 employees temporarily out of work. Buckling racks destroyed factory equipment and inventory, while the reactivation of municipal water activated sprinklers and caused substantial water damage, destroying much of the company's paperwork. A week after the earthquake, its sales offices and part of its production operations were moved to a 160,000-square-foot (15,000 m^{2}) complex in Westlake Village, California, on an interim basis. The company later relocated its operations to a new headquarter complex in Sacramento (the former property of the Sacramento Army Depot), in summer 1995. Its customer service team, meanwhile, was relocated to an out-of-state office in Utah.

=== 1995–2001: Reversal of fortunes and acquisition by NEC ===
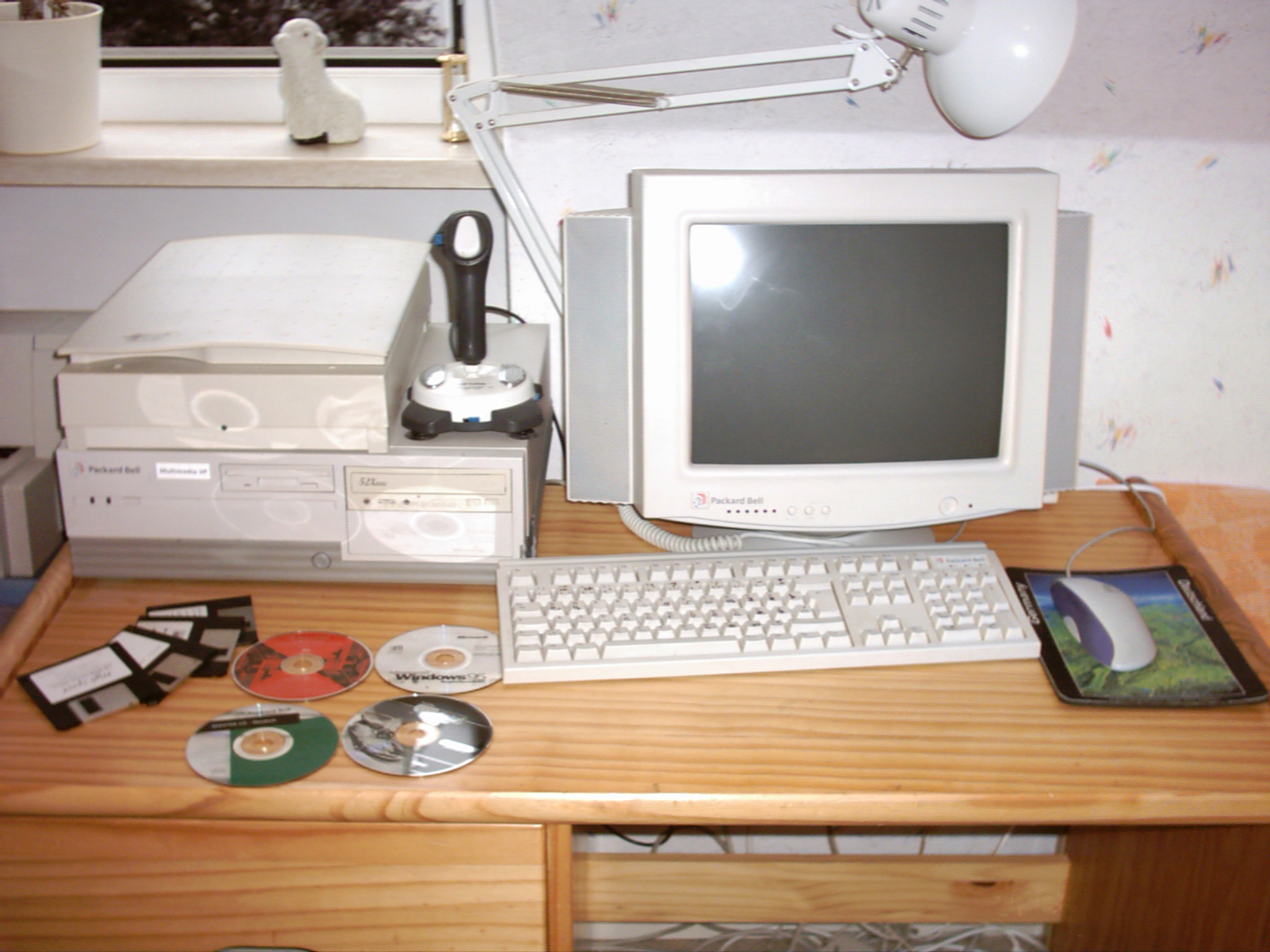
Packard Bell desktop from the mid-1990s

Packard Bell saw gross revenues of $3 billion in 1994 and became the third-largest personal computer vendor in the United States, trailing Compaq and IBM. In 1995, they overtook Compaq for the number one spot in American PC market share, cornering 13 percent of sales in the United States, following a 37-percent rate of growth from the previous year. While the company had seen tremendous growth in the mid-1990s, the long-term efficacy of the company's core strategies were being challenged by mail-order computer vendors such as Dell and Gateway 2000, who were able to shirk the large overheads of warehousing and vending by selling build-to-order. Packard Bell's reliance on retail also imparted a large rate of return on their products, due to the unqualified return and exchange policies most of Packard Bell's retail partners afforded their customers. In 1991 alone, the company deducted $143 million in customer returns on $819 million in gross sales that year. By the end of 1995, Packard Bell saw their profit drop, and they dropped to the number two spot in American PC market share, behind Compaq. The company's reputation around this time was also beginning to be marred by quality control issues and subpar customer service.

In April 1995, Compaq launched a lawsuit against Packard Bell for not disclosing that Packard Bell computers incorporated used parts, claiming that this practice of refurbishment without disclosure allowed Packard Bell to unfairly undercut its competition. This practice was, in fact, widespread in the computer industry, including Compaq itself. However, unlike its rival companies, Packard Bell was judged not to have advertised the practice sufficiently in its warranties—Compaq, for instance, placed numerous stickers on boxes of its refurbished hardware indicating this status. Attorneys general across 12 states launched investigations into Packard Bell in June 1995; the following month, Packard Bell settled nine class-action suits in three states, including California, providing reimbursement in the form of $50 worth of repairs for free in the short term, establishing a $1-million fund for monetary reimbursement in the long term, and changing its warranty policy. Packard Bell eventually paid $5 million to 22 states to settle the issue in September 1996. Packard Bell countersued Compaq in October 1995, citing "unfair competition and defamation". They settled out of court in February 1996, after Compaq themselves were facing heat from multiple states for its own refurbishment practices.

In early 1996, Packard Bell acquired Zenith Data Systems from Groupe Bull of France, in a three-way deal which saw Groupe Bull and Japanese electronics conglomerate NEC increasing their existing stakes in Packard Bell. Shortly after, in June 1996, NEC announced that it would acquire Packard Bell, merging it with NEC's global personal computer operations. The merger was finalized in July 1996; the resulting division became known as Packard Bell NEC, selling computer systems under both NEC and Packard Bell faceplates. For a brief period, Packard Bell NEC was the largest PC manufacturer, in terms of units shipped, in the United States, with 15 percent of market share; it was also the third largest PC vendor in the world in terms of sales at the end of 1996. However, Compaq overtook the number one spot from Packard Bell NEC in early 1997, at which point the latter fell behind Apple in retail sales to the number three spot.

Between 1997 and 1998, Packard Bell posted losses totaling more than $1 billion. In the United States, price pressure from Compaq and, later, eMachines, along with continued poor showings in consumer satisfaction surveys made it difficult for the company to remain profitable and led to Alagem's departure in 1998. In 1999, NEC began withdrawing the Packard Bell name from the American market, while keeping it in Europe, where the brand was untainted by allegations of substandard quality.

=== 2001–2006: NEC Computers ===
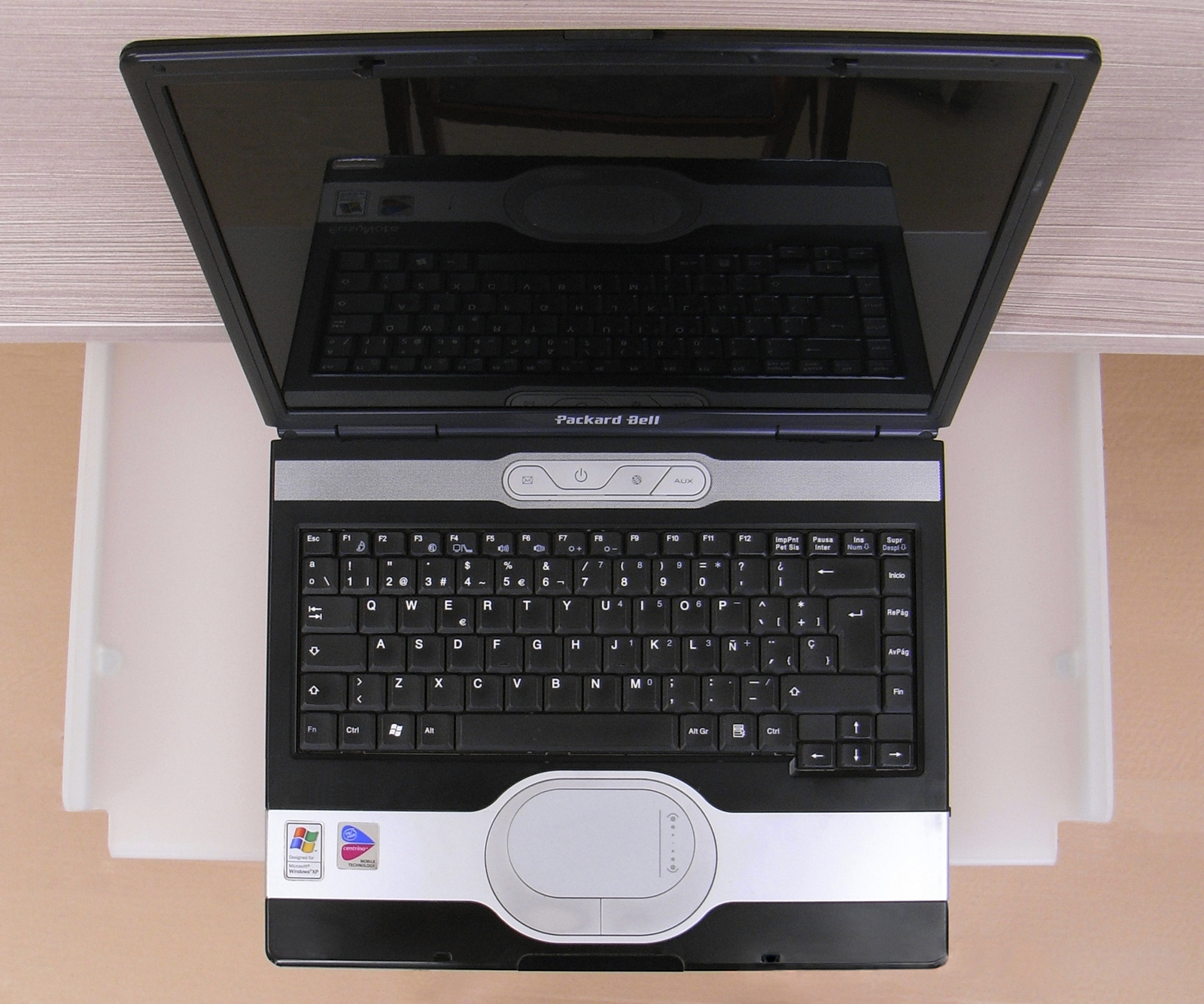
Packard Bell EasyNote laptop with Windows XP installed

Packard Bell operated as NEC Computers, a division of NEC created to consolidate the company’s personal computer business outside of Japan and China. This structure followed NEC's earlier acquisition of Packard Bell NEC in 1998. During this period, the brand concentrated its efforts in the European market, where it maintained consumer presence after discontinuing its operations in North America around 2000 due to financial challenges and market competition.

By 2003, Packard Bell had offices in 24 countries, excluding the United States. The company reported growth in several European markets during the early 2000s. In 2006, NEC sold Packard Bell to Lap Shun Hui, founder of eMachines, as part of a strategic shift to focus on enterprise-oriented technologies.

=== 2006–2009: Divestiture from NEC and acquisition by Acer ===
In 2006, the chairman of the California-based Clifford Holdings, Lap Shun Hui, acquired the rights to the Packard Bell name from NEC for an undisclosed sum, establishing PB Holdings in the process. Hui was in talks with Lenovo Group of China to sell the rights to the Packard Bell name to the latter in early 2007. However, Acer of Taiwan ultimately intervened, making a binding offer to acquire PB Holdings in October 2007. Acer's acquisition of Packard Bell occurred in the aftermath of its recent takeover of Gateway in August 2007 and was said to be a strategic deal to prevent Lenovo's expansion into Europe, where Acer had a strong presence. The deal was finalized between January and February 2008, Hui receiving $48.5 million in cash.

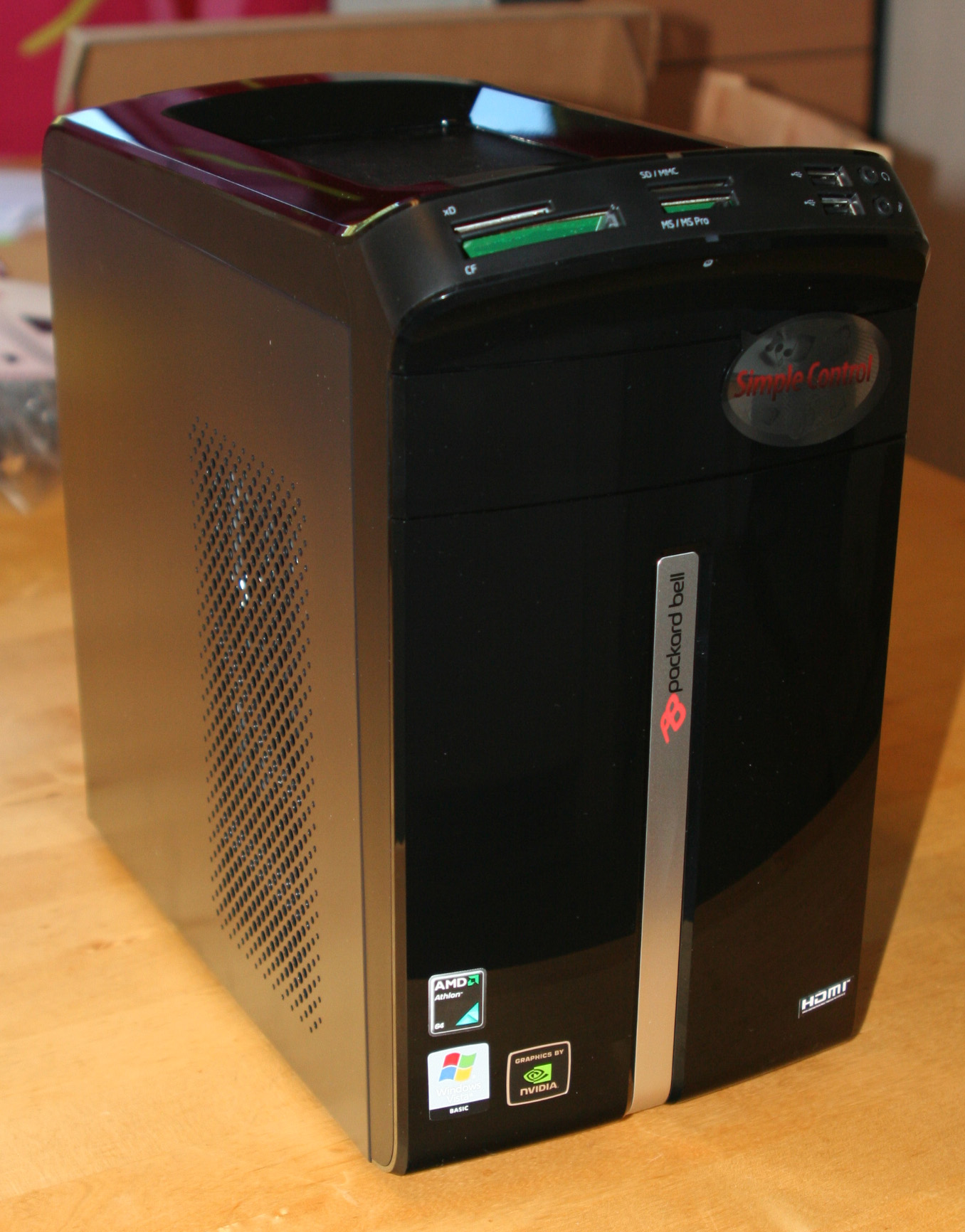
Packard Bell desktop computer from 2009

With the purchases of Packard Bell and Gateway, Acer arranged its marketing strategy so that Gateway products were sold in the Americas and Asia, while Packard Bell products were sold in Africa, Europe and the Middle East; Acer-branded products meanwhile were sold worldwide. In 2013, Acer announced that the eMachines brand will be discontinued in the low-end market but that both Packard Bell and Gateway would continue.

=== 2018–present: Revival in North America ===
In 2015 Southern Telecom, a Brooklyn-based manufacturer of consumer electronics acquired the Packard Bell brand in North America. In 2018, the company announced the release of new Packard Bell-branded computers.

=== 2019–present: Revival in Africa ===
Since 2019 Packard Bell has been manufactured under license by Universal Exports Group Limited from Acer Taiwan in the SADC region, Universal has released new models of Phones, Tablets and Laptops which are most prominently available in South Africa.

== Notable products ==
- PB286LP, Packard Bell's first laptop, equipped with a 12-MHz Intel 80286 microprocessor, 1 MB of RAM, a single ISA slot, and a monochrome CGA (later VGA) screen
- Packard Bell Statesman, a notebook computer based on a chassis designed by Zenith Data Systems, running a Cyrix Cx486SLC microprocessor clocked at either 33 or 50 MHz and possessing a passive-matrix monochrome or color display

== Logos ==
1986–1993

1993–2004

2004–2009

2009–present

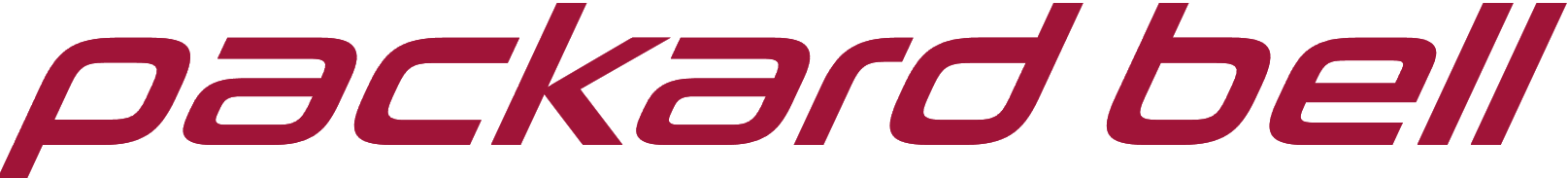
2018–present (North America only)

== See also ==
- Reveal Computer Products, a short-lived peripheral manufacturing subsidiary of the company active from 1992 to 1996
