= The Beverly Hilton =

Hotel in Beverly Hills, California

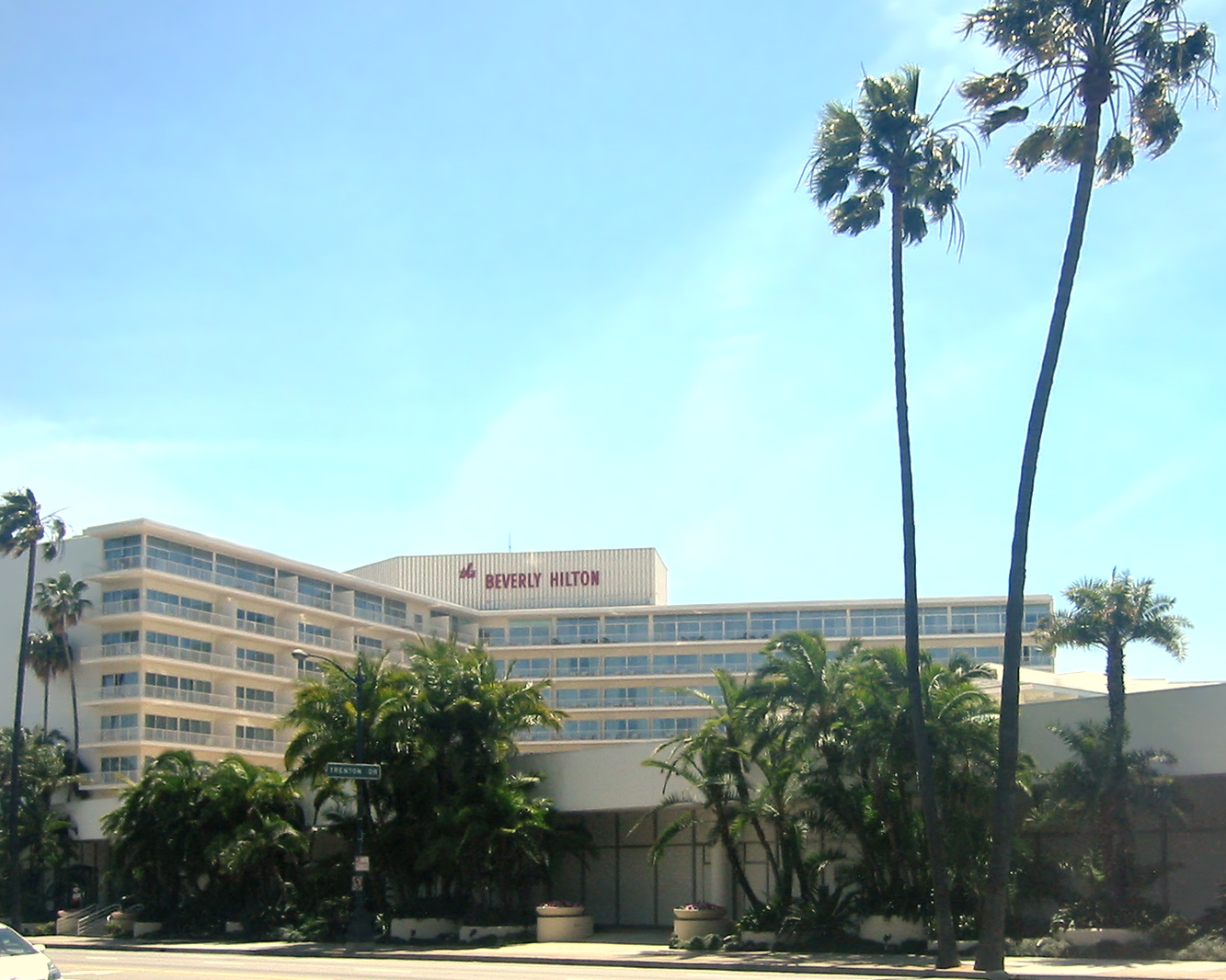
- The Beverly Hilton as seen from Wilshire Boulevard

- Location in Beverly Hills/Western Los Angeles Area Location in California Location in the United States

General information
- Location: 9876 Wilshire Boulevard; Beverly Hills, California 90210
- Coordinates: 34°3′59″N 118°24′47″W
- Opening: August 12, 1955
- Owner: Oasis West Realty
- Operator: Hilton Worldwide

Technical details
- Floor count: 7

Design and construction
- Architect: Welton Becket
- Developer: Conrad Hilton
- Main contractor: Del E. Webb Construction

Other information
- Number of rooms: 570
- Number of suites: 101

Website
- www.beverlyhilton.com

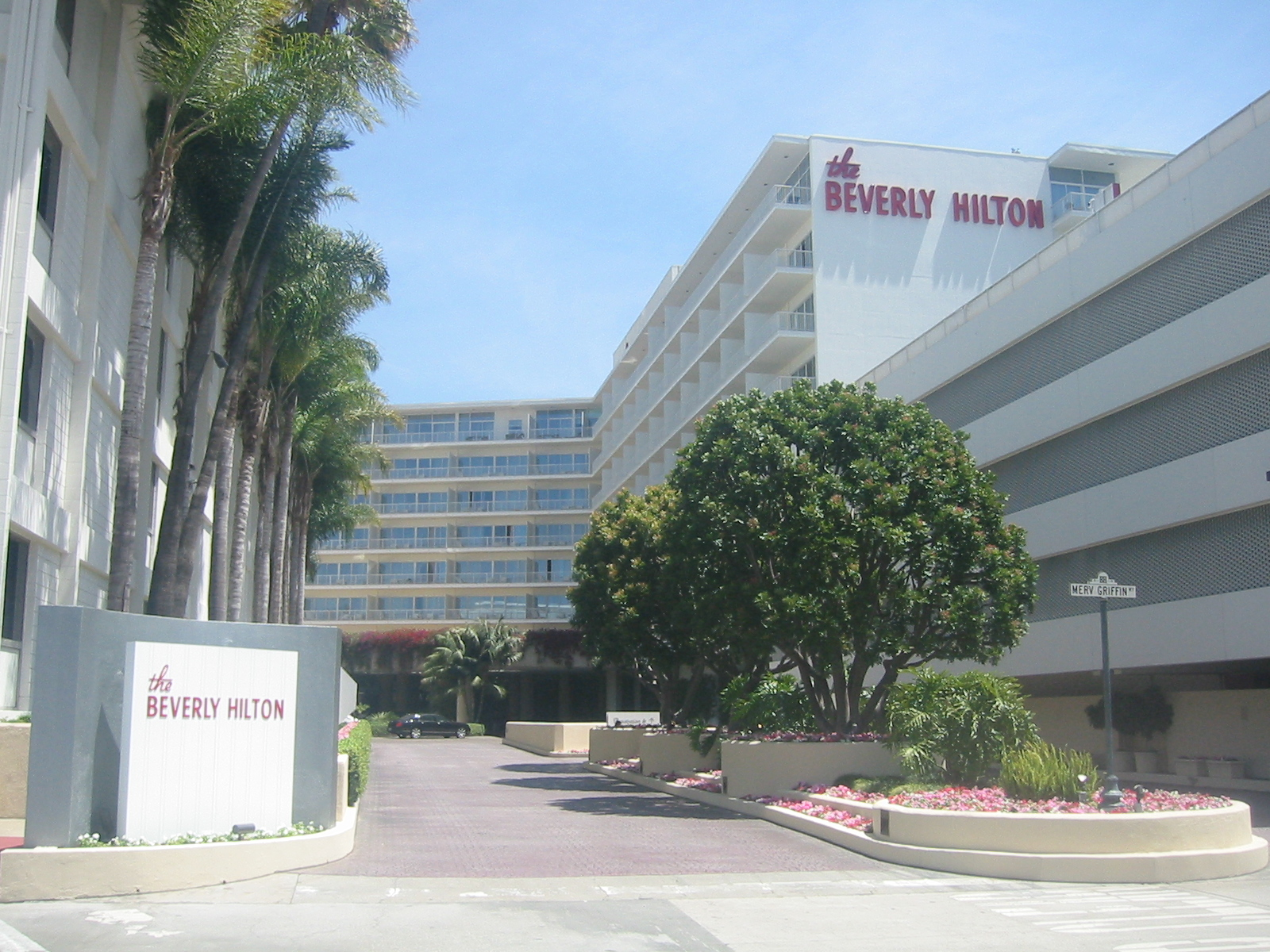
Entrance to the Beverly Hilton Hotel

The Beverly Hilton is a hotel located on an 8.9-acre (3.6 ha) property at the intersection of Wilshire and Santa Monica boulevards in Beverly Hills, California, United States. The Beverly Hilton has hosted many awards shows, charity benefits, and entertainment and motion picture industry events, and is particularly known as the venue of the annual Golden Globe Awards ceremony.

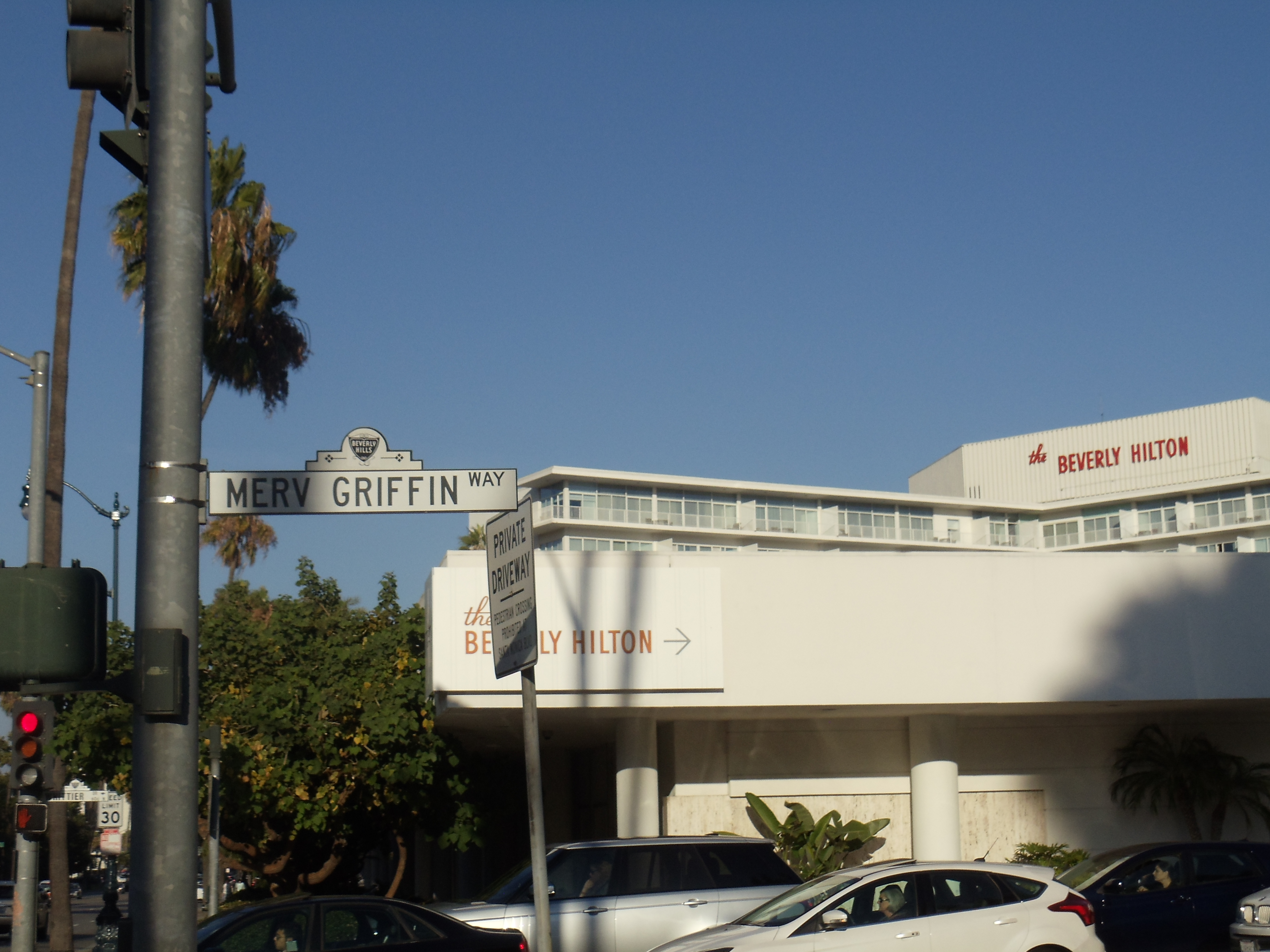
Merv Griffin Way with The Beverly Hilton in the background, in Beverly Hills, California.

== History ==
In 1949, the Hilton Hotels Corporation entered into an agreement to lease a new hotel set to be constructed by the Crummer Development Corporation on a 9-acre plot in Beverly Hills. In 1950, after the deal with Crummer fell though, Hilton decided to purchase the company (and the property) for $3.07 million and erect the hotel itself. Crummer Development Corporation was renamed the Beverly Hilton Development Corporation prior to its liquidation and absorption into the parent company.

In August 1953, construction began on the $12 million, 416-room hotel, designed by architect Welton Becket. As construction costs increased, and the hotel's planned 1954 opening was postponed, Hilton was forced to take out a $5 million mortgage that year on the Mayflower Hotel in Washington, D.C. to cover the rising costs.

The formal opening of the Beverly Hilton was held on August 11, 1955, attended by Conrad Hilton and his longtime companion Ann Miller. Vice President Richard Nixon presided over the raising of the American flag at the ceremonies.

The hotel proved to be an immediate success and its Bali Room ballroom was doubled in size in 1957, at a cost of $400,000, reopening in 1958 as the 1700-seat International Ballroom, the largest on the West Coast. Since 1961, the International Ballroom has hosted the Golden Globe Awards ceremony, presented annually (until 2023) by the Hollywood Foreign Press Association. In 1960, the hotel was further expanded with the 2-story Lanai wing, with 41 rooms whose sliding glass doors gave out directly onto the pool and patio.

In March 1961, Hilton Hotels sold the property to a group of private investors for $13.4 million, under an arrangement where it leased the hotel back for 35 years, with renewal options for a further 64 years, and retained the right to repurchase the hotel at its sale price in either 1966 or 1967. The hotel also completed a new 500-car garage in 1961, giving it parking for a total of 1500 cars, the largest hotel parking facility in the world. The new garage was sold to and leased back from the same group in 1962 for a further $900,000. In March 1966, Hilton exercised its option to re-buy the hotel and garage, for $14.3 million. In June of that year, construction began on a 180-room addition, a connecting 4-story building surrounding a new swimming pool, completed in 1967, which brought the hotel to a total of 630 rooms. At the same time, the lobby and International Ballroom were renovated and a new ballroom was also added.

In 1975, Hilton sold a 50% interest in six of its hotels, including the Beverly Hilton, to the Prudential Insurance Company. The two companies co-owned the Beverly Hilton through a new entity called the Beverly Hilton Joint Venture. The partnership sold the hotel to entertainer and businessman Merv Griffin for $100.2 million in December 1987.

The Beverly Hilton had completed a $35 million renovation prior to Griffin's purchase. The hotel was Griffin's second choice, as he had expressed an interest in buying the 260-room Beverly Hills Hotel, which had recently been sold to Sultan Hassanal Bolkiah of Brunei for $200 million by a group headed by Denver oilman Marvin Davis.

Griffin owned the hotel from 1987 to 2003, during which time its reputation faded as maintenance was deferred and competition increased. In 2003, Griffin sold the Beverly Hilton for $130 million to Beny Alagem, co-founder of Packard Bell Electronics, through his company Oasis West Realty. Commemorating its 50th anniversary, an ambitious $80 million renovation by architecture firm Gensler began in conjunction with Hilton Hotels, which has managed the property since it opened.

The renovation reduced the number of rooms to 570, which feature 42-inch plasma high-definition televisions and Bose Wave radios. The rooms also have ample work spaces, reflecting a change at the hotel, which long catered mostly to leisure travelers, into a property where business travelers constitute 80 percent of the clientele. The meeting spaces and the International Ballroom were also renovated.

On February 11, 2012, singer Whitney Houston died in Suite 434 after accidentally drowning in the bathtub. The room number was retired and the room repurposed.

=== Beverly Hills Waldorf Astoria and Measure H ===
In April 2006, owners unveiled plans for a $500-million expansion to the Beverly Hilton property. The plans require an amendment to the Beverly Hills general plan's three-story height limit in order to build two 13-story condominium towers and a 15-story condo hotel, where rooms would be rented to guests when their owners are away. One intent of the owner's plan was "to position the upgraded hotel as a less-expensive 4½-star alternative to nearby five-star rivals such as the Peninsula."

Two new three-story buildings on Wilshire Boulevard would house 96 guest rooms and shops. The Beverly Hilton will be renovated into a smaller, 402-room hotel, renamed the Beverly Hilton Oasis. A 120-room Waldorf-Astoria Beverly Hills hotel, designed by Gensler with interiors by Pierre-Yves Rochon, will be included in the project. The Waldorf-Astoria Beverly Hills was the first new hotel for the brand on the West Coast. The Beverly Hilton and the Waldorf-Astoria are separate premises, with both operated and managed by Hilton Hotels Corporation.

The Beverly Hills City Council approved the $500 million project by a 3–2 vote. Local resident opponents led by a group called Citizens Right to Decide Committee gathered enough signatures to place the referendum (Measure H) on November 4, 2008, ballot with the argument that "It's Just Too Big." Measure H authorized the Beverly Hills City Council to amend the city's general plan to allow a "luxury hotel, condominiums and open space" to be built on the site of the Beverly Hilton Hotel. Resolution No. 08-R-12601, "Resolution of the Council of the City of Beverly Hills amending the General Plan to enable the revitalization of the Beverly Hilton Hotel site with a new Luxury Hotel, Condominiums, and Open Space," Los Angeles County election officials reported a week after the vote that local Measure H was losing by 68 votes, with provisional ballots yet to be counted. On December 2, 2008, Proposal H passed by 129 votes with over 15,000 cast.

In April 2014, Oasis West Realty, owner of The Beverly Hilton and Hilton Worldwide announced that Waldorf Astoria Beverly Hills will be built at the intersection of Santa Monica and Wilshire Boulevards, adjacent to the hotel. The 12-story, 170-room Waldorf Astoria Beverly Hills was designed by architecture firm Gensler with interiors by Pierre-Yves Rochon. The hotel also features a monumental stainless steel sculpture titled 'SWAY' which was designed and fabricated by sculptor Nick Petronzio. Additionally, the Waldorf Astoria has upscale eateries as well as stores including jeweler Graff Diamonds, a Waldorf Astoria Spa meeting space, and a ballroom that can hold up to 200 people. The property opened in 2017.

=== Beverly Hills Measure HH ===
Measure HH (or the Hilton Condominium Tower initiative) was a November 2016 ballot initiative to allow Oasis West Realty to build a 37-story condominium tower on the Beverly Hilton site. The initiative was rejected by Beverly Hills voters, with nearly 56% voting no.

=== One Beverly Hills ===
In 2021, Beverly Hilton owner Alagem Capital announced plans to redevelop the 17-acre adjacent property as One Beverly Hills. The city council voted 4–1 and approved the $5 billion project, which was designed by Norman Foster, with Adamson Associates Inc. as architect of record. The Beverly Hilton will be part of the new development. Two main residential towers, 28 and 32 stories, will contain just under 200 Aman-branded condominiums, while a smaller 10-story building on Wilshire will contain an Aman Hotel, featuring 75 suites. The complex will also have approximately 35,000 square feet (3,300 m^{2}) of retail and restaurant space, a subterranean parking garage for 2,100 vehicles, and eight acres of park-like open space, walking paths and botanical gardens, accessible to the public. Construction started in February 2024 with a completion date in 2031. The multi-story parking garage of The Beverly Hilton was demolished in summer 2024 as part of this work.

== Notable events ==
- Golden Globe Awards since 1961
- Gracie Awards presented by the Alliance for Women in Media Foundation, since 1975
- Clive Davis Pre-Grammy Party
- Richard Nixon's "last press conference", in which he lashed out at the media following his defeat in the 1962 California governor's race.
- U.S. presidential candidate and senator John Edwards was videotaped visiting Rielle Hunter, during his 2008 extramarital affair scandal.
- USA Swimming's Golden Goggle Awards in 2007 and 2009
- Singer Whitney Houston died at the hotel on February 11, 2012, after accidentally drowning while in the bathtub of her suite.
- Aviation awards presented by the Society of Experimental Test Pilots and the Living Legends of Aviation

== Film location ==
The Beverly Hilton was the film location and/or setting of the films To Live and Die in L.A. (1985), Frost/Nixon (2008) and Argo (2012).

== See also ==
- Hilton Worldwide
