= The Stage, Shoreditch =

Coordinates: 51°31′22″N 0°04′47″W

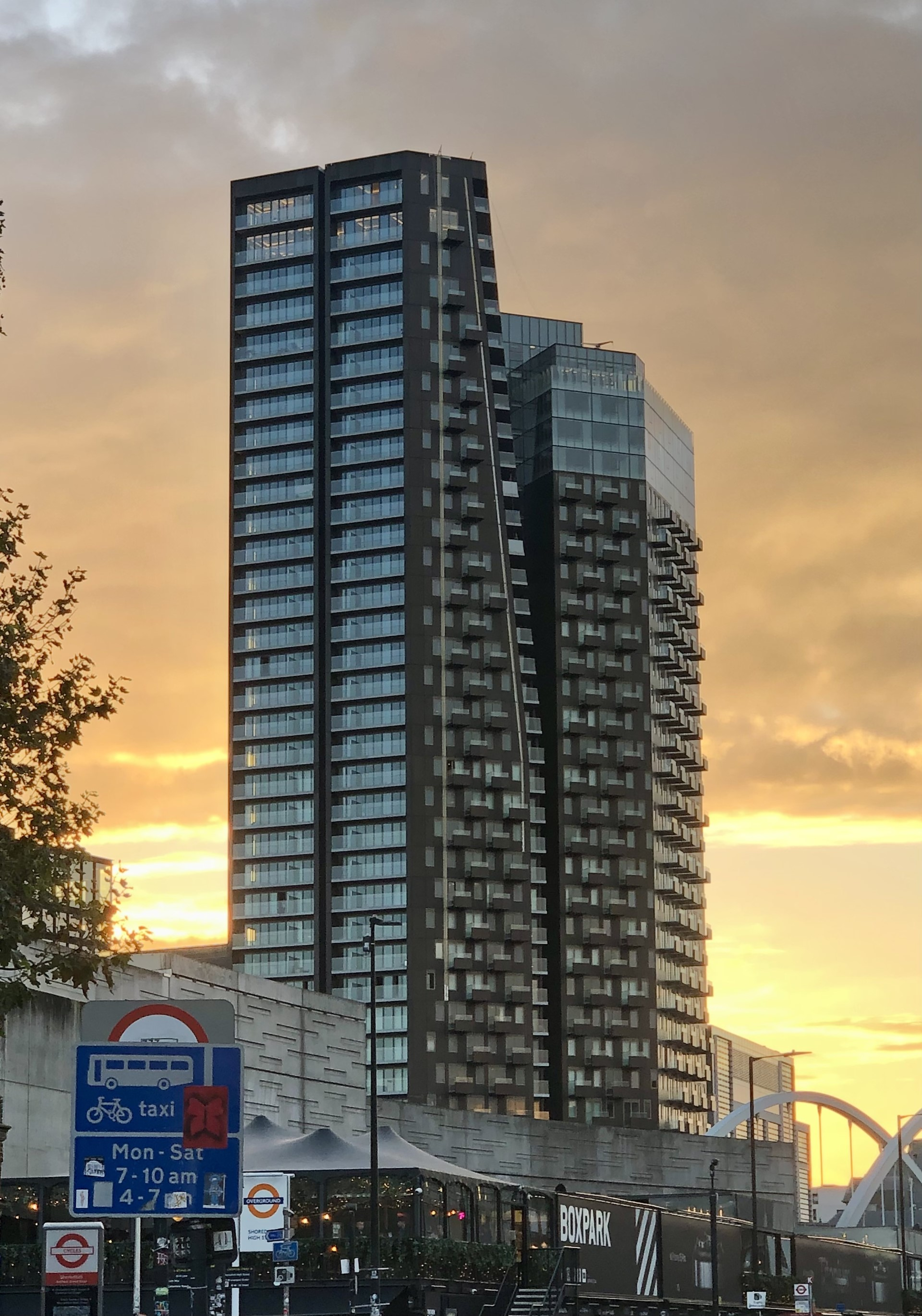
The Stage in October 2023

The Stage is a mixed-use development in Shoreditch, located in the London Borough of Hackney and was built by property developer Galliard Homes, Cain Hoy, McCourt Global, Vanke and The Estate Office Shoreditch. The development is set to include a 37-storey residential tower, over 250,000 sq. ft. of office, retail and leisure space as well as incorporating a world heritage centre on the site of Shakespeare's Curtain Theatre. Centred on the theatre, the development will also feature over an acre of public space including a performance area and a park.

== History of the Curtain Theatre ==
During the 1570s, Shoreditch was London's first theatre district and the birthplace of modern theatre. The Curtain opened in 1577. It disappeared from historical records in 1622 but could have remained in use until the outbreak of the Civil War, 20 years later, giving it the longest history of use of all of London's Shakespearian playhouses. Documents show that the Curtain was later used as tenements from the 1630s, by which time the playhouse had fallen out of use.

Shakespeare's company, the Lord Chamberlain's Men, used the Curtain Theatre from 1597 to 1599, meaning that Shakespeare's earlier plays were most likely performed here. Indeed, Henry V is believed to have debuted at the theatre while other plays, such as Romeo and Juliet and Every Man In His Humour, would have been performed there too

== Excavation of the site ==
In 2016, archaeologists from the Museum of London Archaeology (MOLA) excavated the site of the Curtain Theatre. The dig revealed a number of notable artefacts and facts about the theatre, including:

- In May 2016, MOLA announced that the theatre was purpose-built and, unusually, the theatre was rectangular rather than round or polygonal
- A fragmentary ceramic bird whistle, dating from the late 16th century, which may have been used as a prop or for sound effects
- In November 2016, fragments of ceramic money boxes were found, which would have been used to collect entry fees from theatregoers (from which derives the term ‘box office’)
- Glass beads and pins were unearthed along with drinking vessels and clay pipes

== Image gallery ==
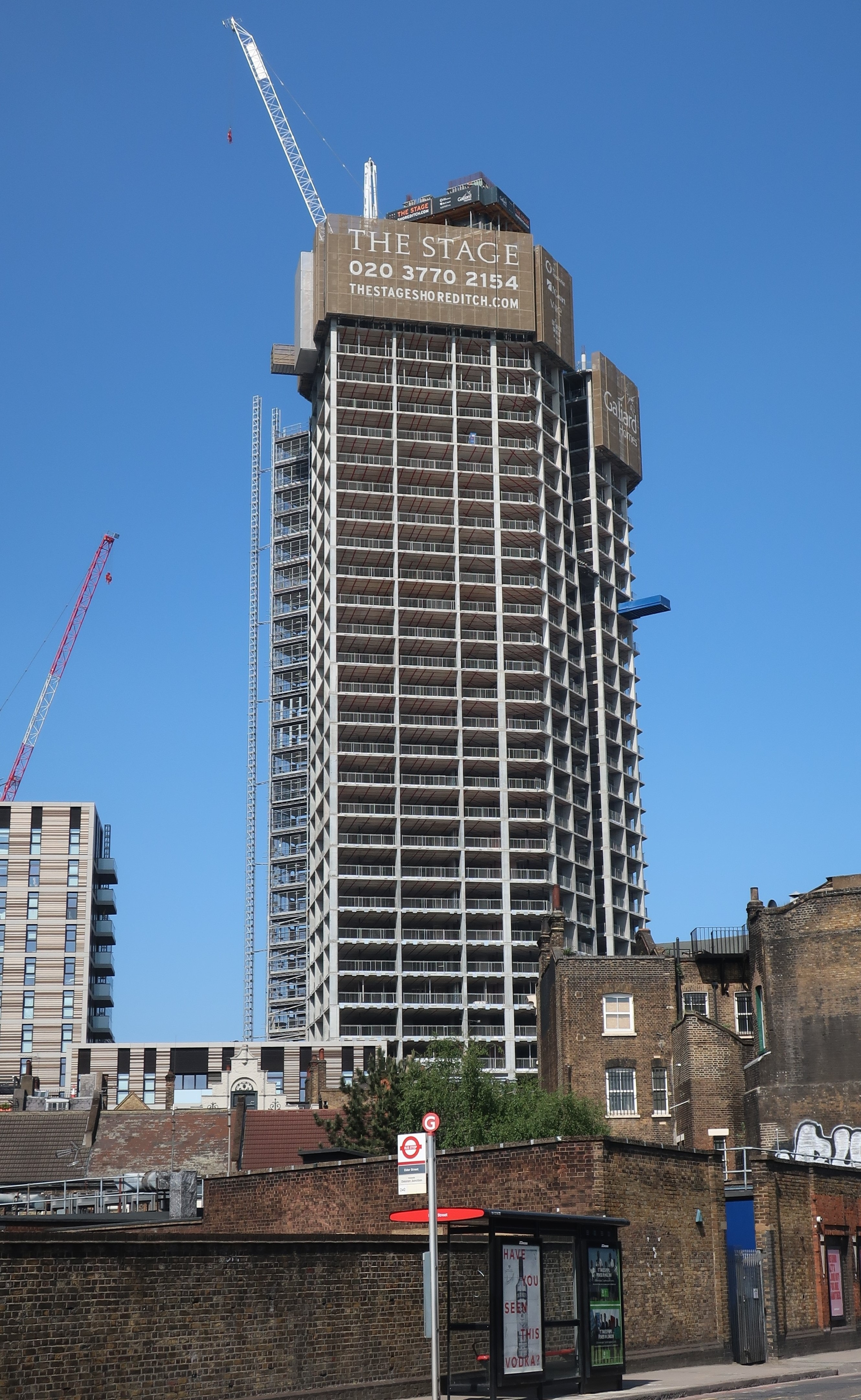
Under construction, May 2020

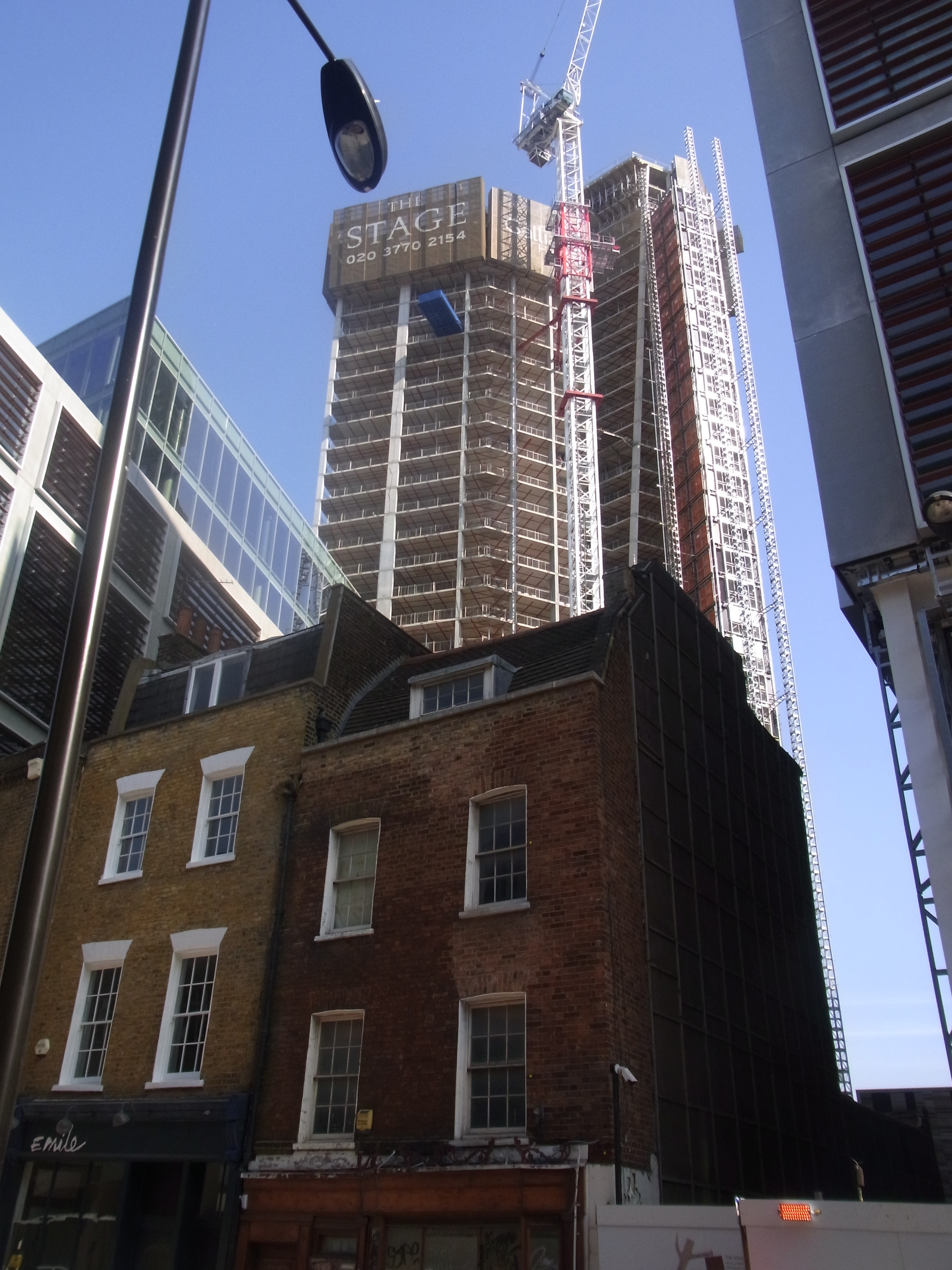
Under construction, September 2020

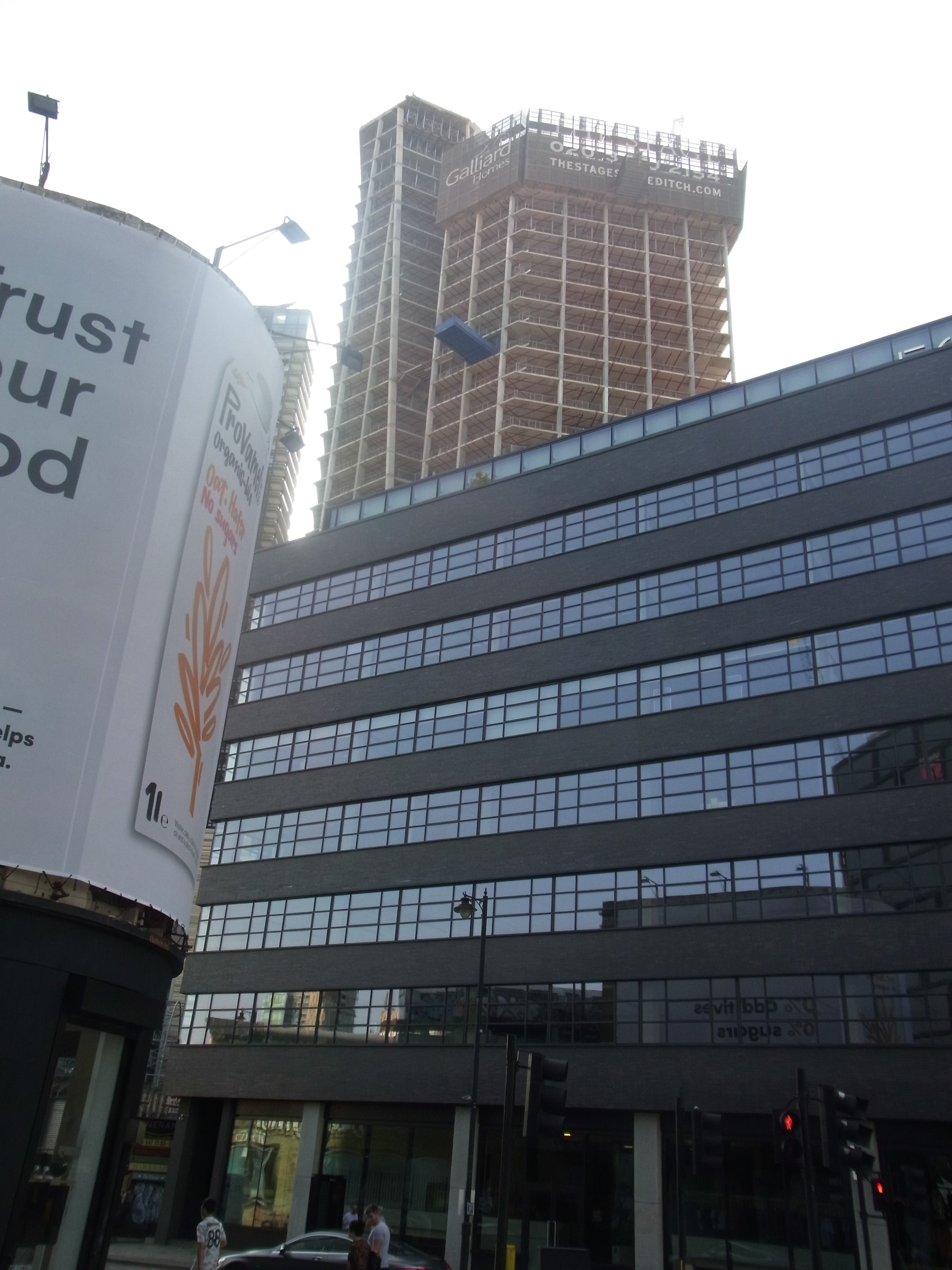
Under construction, September 2020
