= Microsoft Bob =

Microsoft software product

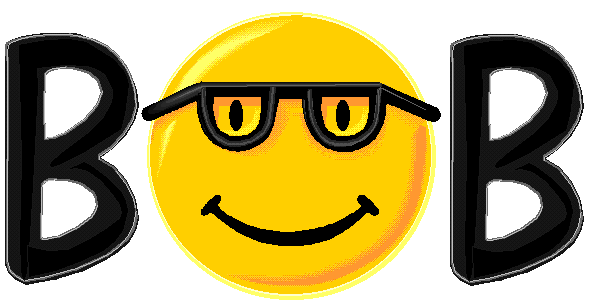
- Developer: Microsoft
- Release: March 10, 1995; 31 years ago
- Final release: 1.00a / August 30, 1995
- Operating system: Windows 3.1, Windows 95, Windows 98, Windows Me, Windows XP
- Type: GUI
- License: Proprietary

Microsoft Bob is a Microsoft software product intended to provide a more user-friendly interface for the Windows 3.1, Windows 95 and Windows NT operating systems, supplanting the Windows Program Manager. The program was released on March 10, 1995, and discontinued in early 1996. Microsoft Bob presented screens showing a house, with rooms that the user could visit containing familiar objects corresponding to computer applications, such as a desk with pen and paper and a checkbook. Clicking on the pen and paper would open the system's word processor. A cartoon dog named Rover and other cartoon characters provided guidance using speech balloons.

Upon release, Microsoft Bob was criticized in the media and did not gain wide acceptance with users, which resulted in its discontinuation. Its legacy would be observed in future Microsoft products, notably the use of virtual assistants. The Rover character later reappeared as a Windows XP search companion.

== History ==
Microsoft Bob was released in March 1995 (before Windows 95 was released), although it had been widely publicized under the codename Utopia. The project leader for Bob was Karen Fries, a Microsoft researcher. The design was based on research by professors Clifford Nass and Byron Reeves of Stanford University. Melinda Gates, then wife of Bill Gates, was the marketing manager for the product. Microsoft originally purchased the domain name bob.com from Boston-area techie Bob Antia, but later traded it to Bob Kerstein for the windows2000.com domain name.

== Applications ==
A screenshot of the "family room" area of the Microsoft Bob software, including the "Assistant" character Rover

Microsoft Bob includes various office-suite programs such as a finance application and a word processor. The user interface was designed to simplify the navigational experience for novice computer users.

Similar to early graphical shells like Jane, the main interface is portrayed as the inside of a house, with different rooms corresponding to common real-world room styles such as a kitchen or family room. Each room contains decorations and furniture, as well as icons that represent applications. The user may also fully customize the entire house and has full control over each room's decoration. The user may add, remove or reposition all objects. The user can also add or remove rooms and change the destinations of each door. The program offers multiple themes for room designs and decorations, such as contemporary and postmodern.

The applications built into Microsoft Bob are represented by matching utilities. For example, clicking on a clock opens the calendar, while a pen and paper represent the word processor. The user can also add shortcuts to applications on the computer. These shortcuts display the icon inside various styles of decorations, such as boxes and picture frames.

Bob includes the ability to install new applications, but because of the failure of the product, only a single add-on application package, Microsoft Great Greetings, was released.

Released just as the Internet was beginning to become popular, Bob offered an email client with which a user could subscribe to MCI Mail, a dial-up email account. The price was $5.00 per month to send up to 15 emails. Each email was limited to 5,000 characters, and each additional email after the limit was reached was an additional 45 cents. Customers were required to call a toll-free phone number to set up the account.

Bob features "Assistants", cartoon characters intended to help the user navigate the virtual house or perform tasks in the main interface or within the built-in applications.

== Gateway 2000 edition ==
A special Gateway 2000-branded edition of Microsoft Bob 1.00a was bundled with the Gateway 2000 computer around 1995. This edition contains Gateway branding on the login screen along with additional rooms and backgrounds not seen in the retail version. One additional room is the attic, which contains the image of a Gateway 2000 computer box. In addition to the extra rooms, more icons appear by default in the new rooms.

== Reception and legacy ==
Although a Consumer Electronics Show demonstration was met with generally positive reactions, reviewers generally derided the software, and Microsoft Bob became one of Microsoft's more visible product failures. The New York Times found the characters irritating and the home design apparently the work of an "esthetically challenged sixth-grader," criticized the hardware requirements and storage file formats and concluded that the program was not as simple to use as Microsoft had advertised. The Washington Post called the home environment "sterile" and "lifeless," wrote that the characters' cuteness wore thin quickly and criticized the scarce customization and access to Windows components. According to PC Data, the real sales from Bob's release until its discontinuation amounted to about 58,000 copies—far short of Microsoft's estimate that it would sell millions as had Microsoft Works and Encarta. Despite being discontinued just one year after launch, Microsoft Bob continued to be sharply criticized in reviews and popular media. In 2017, Melinda Gates acknowledged that the software "needed a more powerful computer than most people had back then."

Microsoft Bob was listed seventh in PC World magazine's list of the 25 worst tech products of all time and as the number-one worst product of the decade by CNET.com. It was also listed among the 50 worst inventions in Time magazine, which called Bob "overly cutesy" and an "operating system designed around Clippy." Microsoft's Steve Ballmer mentioned Bob as an example in which "we decided that we have not succeeded and let's stop [now]."

Microsoft employee Raymond Chen disclosed that an encrypted copy of Bob was included on Windows XP installation CDs in order to consume space to prevent piracy. It was thought that by consuming an additional 30 megabytes on the disc (in the era of dial-up internet access), users with 56 kbit/s modems would be dissuaded from attempting to download the software illegally. Retired Microsoft engineer David Plummer has identified himself as the employee responsible for the encrypted copy. The installer routine would check for the "blob of Bob" and if an "OEM blob" was detected, only an OEM product key would be accepted. Tech journalist Harry McCracken called the story "a delightfully urban legend-y tale" and noted its similarities to an April Fools' Day joke claiming that Bob was hidden in Windows Vista.

The use of virtual assistants in Microsoft Bob later inspired Clippit, colloquially called "Clippy" the paperclip, the default Office Assistant in Microsoft Office. Rover, the dog mascot character introduced with Bob, became a "search companion" for Windows XP's file-search function.

Microsoft graphic designer Vincent Connare designed the typeface Comic Sans when he noticed that Rover's speech was displayed in Times New Roman, which he felt was inappropriate for a cartoon dog. Although Connare's font did not appear in the final release of Microsoft Bob because its characters did not fit within any of the typographical grids, it later debuted in Microsoft's 3D Movie Maker and became an additional typeface for Windows 95.

== See also ==
- Skeuomorph
- Orphaned technology
- Packard Bell Navigator
- eWorld
- Magic Cap
- Interface metaphor

Microsoft

- Microsoft Agent
- Cortana
