= Beny Alagem =

Israeli-American entrepreneur

- בני אלג'ם
- Born: 1953 (age 72–73); Israel
- Occupations: Entrepreneur, business executive, hotelier, philanthropist
- Spouse: Adele Alagem

Binyamin "Beny" Alagem (Hebrew: בנימין "בני" אלג'ם; born 1953) is an Israeli-American entrepreneur, business executive, hotelier and philanthropist. He is the founder and former chief executive of Packard Bell Computers. He is the owner of the Beverly Hilton Hotel and the Waldorf Astoria in Beverly Hills, California.

== Early life ==
Beny Alagem was born in Israel. He was a tank driver. Alagem studied at California State Polytechnic University, Pomona where he met fellow Israeli immigrants Jason Barzilay and Alex Sandel. In 1983, Alagem would partner up with Sandel and Barzilay to start Cal-Abco, a wholesaler of computer parts. In 1986, all three then invested into creating Packard Bell. As of 1995, Cal-Abco was still intact and was listed in the Packard Bell prospectus as a supplier of parts to Packard Bell with a shared credit line between the two companies.

== Career ==
Alagem founded Packard Bell, a personal computer manufacturer, in 1986. He was its chief executive and president until 1998, when he resigned after he disagreed with NEC and Groupe Bull, the two other main shareholders. In January 1999, he acquired the rights to the AST Research name from Samsung.

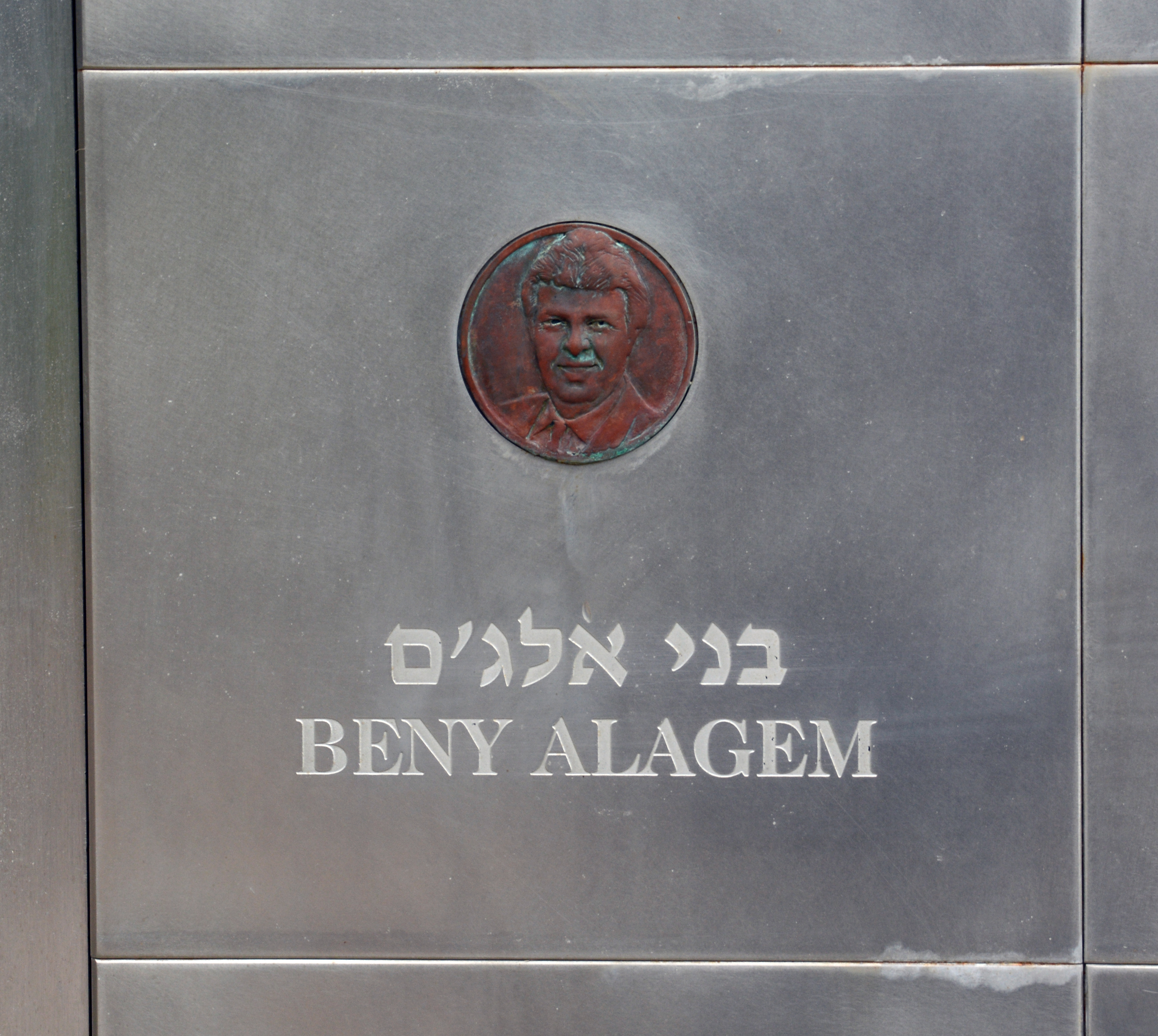
Plate. Monument "The Tel Aviv foundation". Tel Aviv. Israel.

Alagem is the chairman of the Alagem Capital Group, an asset management firm headquartered in Beverly Hills, California. In December 2003, Alagem purchased the Beverly Hilton Hotel from entertainer Merv Griffin for US$130 million through Oasis West Realty LLC, where he is chief executive officer. He proceeded to renovate it for an extra US$90 million. He oversaw the development of the Beverly Hills Waldorf Astoria with Guggenheim Partners, which was dedicated in 2017. Designed by the architectural firm Gensler, it is adjacent to the Beverly Hilton Hotel. The Waldorf Astoria Beverly Hills was the first new luxury hotel for the brand on the West Coast.

== Philanthropy ==
Alagem was appointed an honorary ambassador of the City of Tel Aviv in 1995. He is an honorary member of the board of directors of the Israeli-American Council (IAC). Indeed, he has been described by The Jewish Daily Forward as one of the "major donors" to the IAC. For example, he underwrote the entire cost of the Council Leadership Gala on March 11, 2012. He also is on the advisory board of the American Friends of The Citizens' Empowerment Center in Israel, a non-profit organization headquartered in Beverly Hills which promotes peace in Israel through research and education.

In 2004, Alagem held a fundraiser for the March of the Living, a non-profit organization which annual funds trips for 18,000 students to see the horror of the Auschwitz concentration camp, followed by trip to Israel on Independence Day. The event, which took place at the Beverly Hilton Hotel and was attended by Governor Arnold Schwarzenegger and Israeli ministers Ehud Olmert and Avraham Hirschenson, raised US$1 million.

Alagem co-chaired a fundraiser for the Friends of the Israel Defense Forces at the Beverly Hilton Hotel on December 17, 2009. It raised US$5.2 million for the Israel Defense Forces.

Alagem was the recipient of the Philanthropic Leadership Award from the board of governors of the Cedars-Sinai Medical Center in 2016.

== Personal life ==
Alagem has a wife, Adele. They reside in Bel Air, Los Angeles, California.

== See also ==
- List of largest houses in the Los Angeles Metropolitan Area
- List of largest houses in the United States
