= Olivetti Summa Prima 20 =

Mechanical calculator (produced c. 1960–1974)

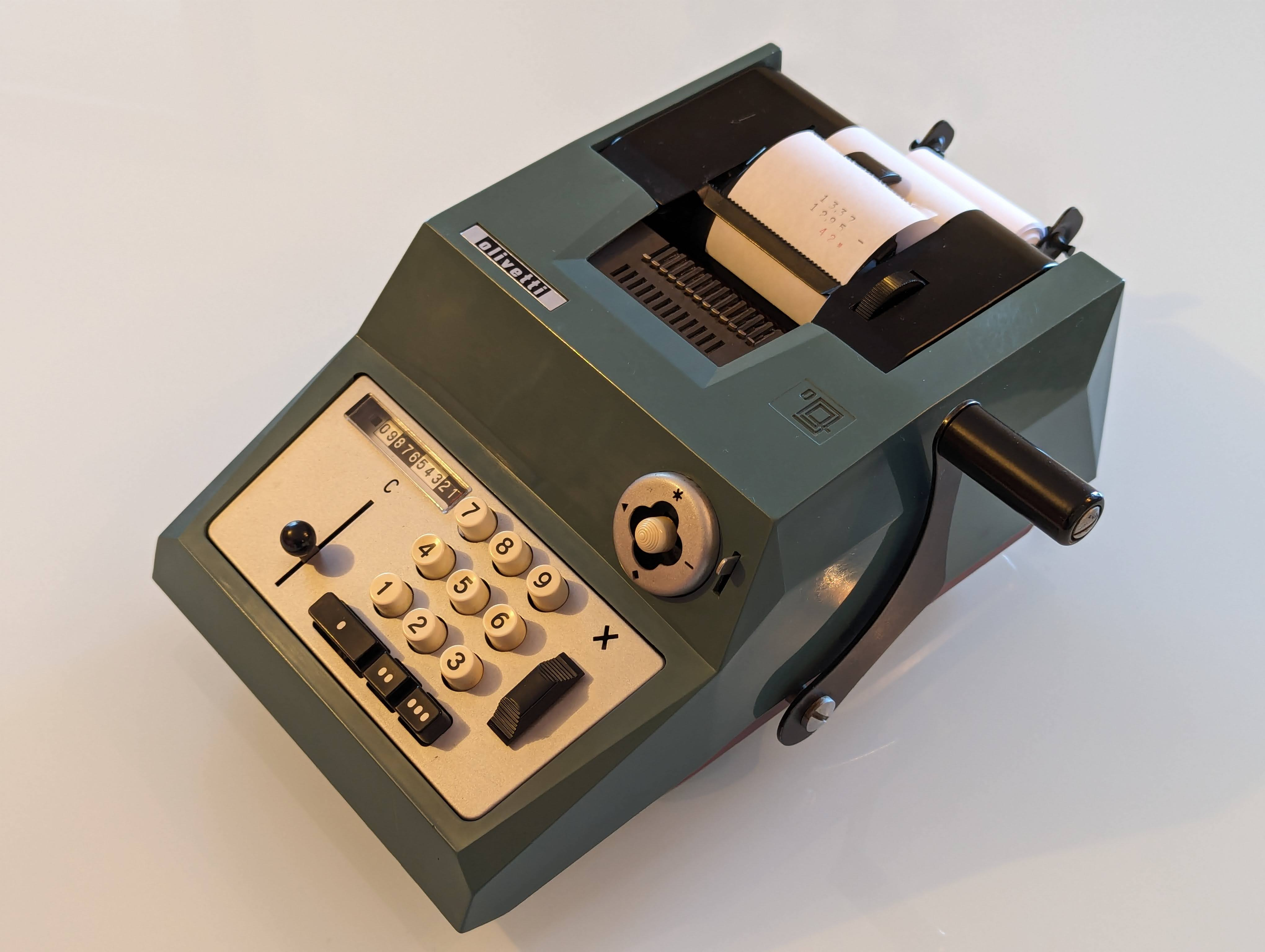
- Olivetti Summa Prima 20 example
- Location: Olivetti lists its company location in Ivrea (TO); Italy
- Type: Mechanical calculator
- Production: The Olivetti Summa Prima 20 was made approximately between 1960 and 1974.

The Olivetti Summa Prima 20 is a mechanical, hand-operated add-listing machine produced between 1960 and 1974. It prints entries and results onto a small paper roll, using an ink ribbon, giving a permanent record of calculations. Each time the operating handle is pulled, the entered number is printed and added to an internal running total – "memory" – which made the machine useful for everyday accounting and cashier-style work.

== Interface ==
The machine is operated by pulling the main handle, which drives the internal mechanism and performs the selected function in a single cycle. The Summa Prima 20 is designed for one-handed use, with the function control placed so it can be flicked by the right thumb just before pulling the handle.

Numbers are entered on a 10-key keypad. A small window beside the keyboard shows the number of digits entered, and if a wrong digit is entered the keyboard can be cleared using the black spherical clearing lever.

For repeated entry of the same number (commonly used for multiplication by repeated addition), the Repeat switch (marked X) is set before the cycle. With Repeat enabled, the keyboard is not cleared after the handle is released, so the same value can be entered again on the next pull.

Changing the operation type is done with the four-way function control, often described as a function “joystick”. The directions correspond to the printed symbols:

- Add (default): the control returns to the centre position for normal addition cycles.
- Subtract (-, right): set the control to - before pulling the handle. A separate right-hand lever can be used to lock the subtraction setting for multiple negative entries.
- Total (*, up): prints the total (in red) and clears the running total (“memory”) after the cycle.
- Subtotal (◊, down): prints the current accumulated sum (in red) while keeping the running total in memory.
- Non-add (<, left): prints the entered number without adding or subtracting it from the running total (useful for item numbers or reference entries).

=== Paper handling and printing ===
The machine advances the printout automatically with each cycle. It also has a manual paper-feed knob, used to advance the paper without performing a calculation cycle. The paper roll is held in a fork at the back of the machine; the left, movable holder can be shifted to the left so the roll can be lifted out. To remove the paper from the feed path, the left holder is pulled up, and the paper strip is pulled out.

== Model differences ==
There were several versions of the Olivetti Summa Prima 20, mainly depending on the currency system used in the target country, and on later production changes (keys and casing).

=== Currency / keyboard variants (decimal vs £sd) ===
Some Prima 20 machines were built for standard decimal entry, while others were made for the pre-decimal British £/s/d (pounds, shillings, pence) system and have extra keys to handle that format.

- £sd (“Sterling”) versions: these are documented with extra keys (commonly 10 and 11) above the normal 10-key keypad, used for pounds/shillings/pence working.
- Switchable decimal ↔ £sd versions: one documented English version uses a small lever on the underside of the machine to switch between decimal and English computations.
- Alternative English switching (WN key): another English version is documented where switching is done via an additional WN (Whole Numbers) key instead of an underside lever.

Because the £sd machines add extra keys and special handling for old currency, they can look like they support “fraction-style” entry compared with the plain decimal model (for example, the extra 10/12 and 11/12 keys used for 10 pence and 11 pence in £sd calculations).

=== Named / catalogued variants (collector lists) ===
Collector catalogues also list named Prima 20 variants, including:

- Summa Prima 20 Simplex
- Summa Prima 20 Sterlina Mod 71
- Summa Prima 20 Sterlina Mod 71 Simplex

=== Production changes (early vs late machines) ===
Documented Prima 20 examples show visible differences between earlier and later production:

- Keytops: later machines are documented with square keytops.
- Casing / base: John Wolff documents a late-model Prima 20 where the sheet-metal base was replaced by a plastic tray, and the joystick area is surrounded by a white plastic bezel.

(These changes are consistent with weight/cost-saving design updates, especially as electronic calculators became common in the early 1970s and replaced many add-listing machines in everyday office use.)

=== Regional production / rebrands ===
Depending on market and manufacturing arrangements, the same basic machine can also appear under other names or build locations:

- Restysuma 20 is documented as a name used for machines produced/sold by Hispano Olivetti.
- Some Prima 20 machines found in Australia are documented as coming from Olivetti factories in Argentina and from assemblers in South Africa.

== Gallery ==
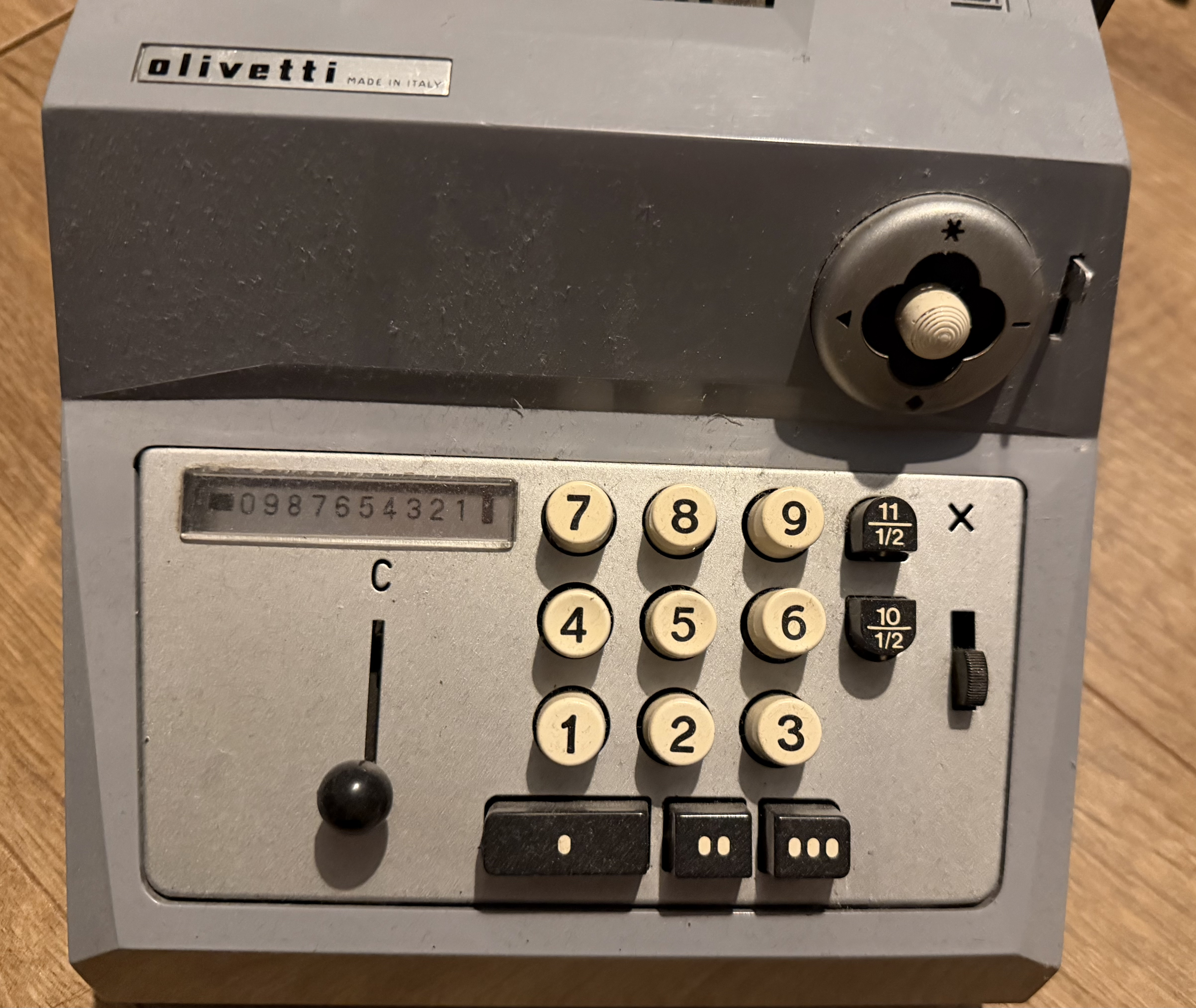
This is an Olivetti Summa Prima 20 variant with fraction keys

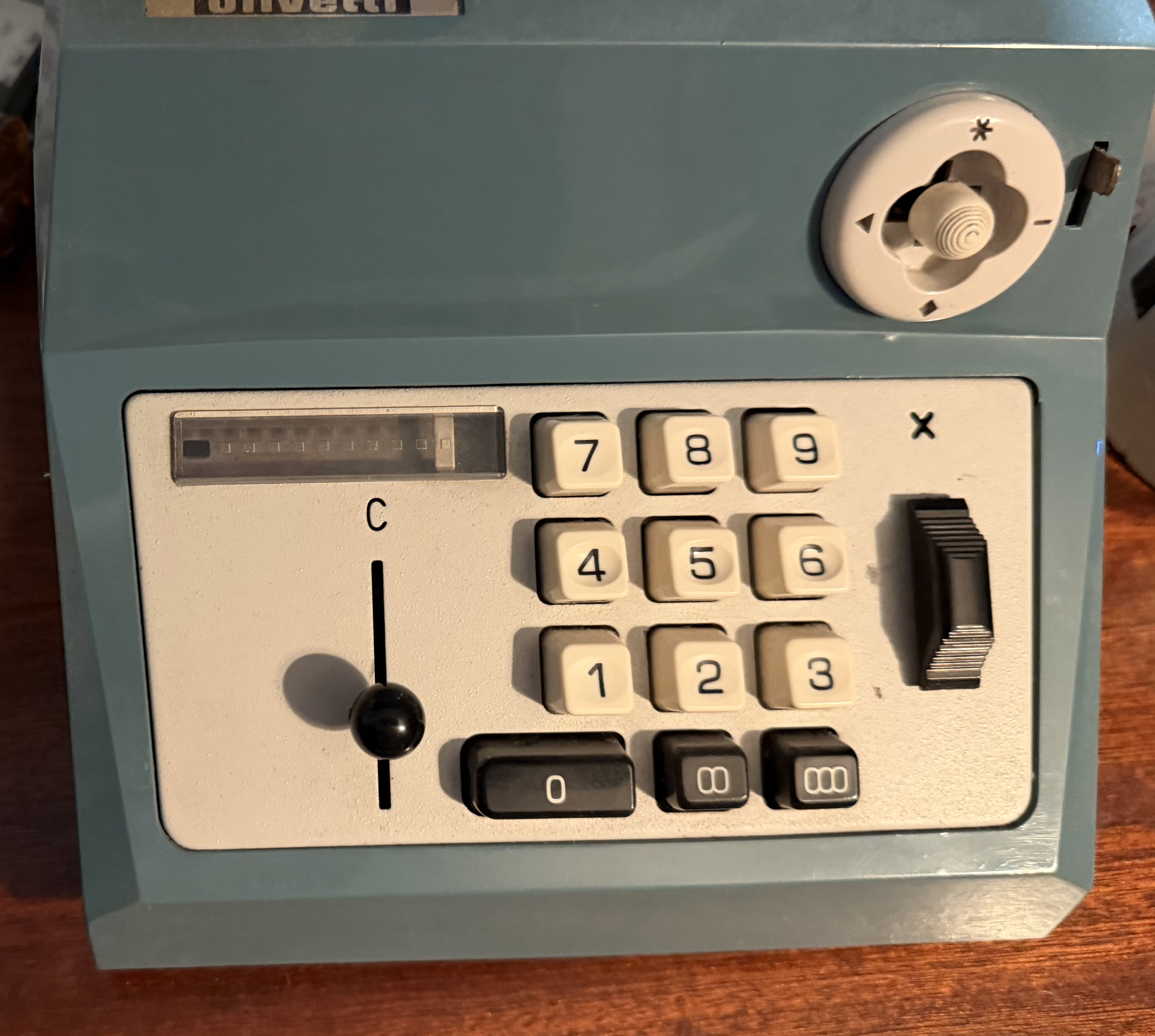
Olivetti Summa Prima 20 (decimal variant) without £sd/fraction keys, with an unlabelled digit-entry indicator window.
