= Paper roll =

Paper roll may refer to:

- Continuous stationery
- Gỏi cuốn (a Vietnamese rice paper roll)
- Music roll
  - Piano roll
- Newsprint
- Paper towel
- Scroll
- Thermal paper
- Till roll
- Toilet paper

== See also ==
- Rolling paper
