= Electronic voting in the European Parliament =

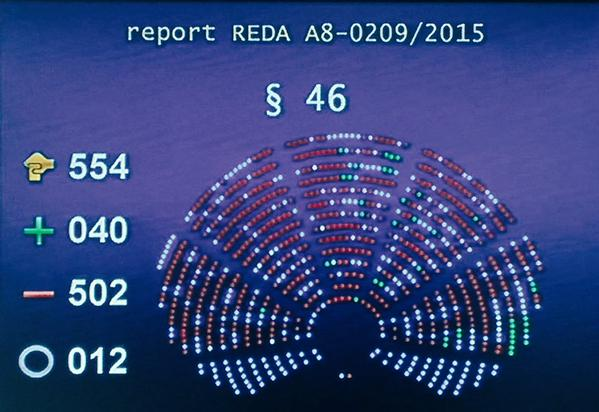
Screen showing the result of an electronic vote in the European Parliament in 2015

The European Parliament uses electronic voting to determine the results of roll call votes held during its plenary sessions. Ordinary votes may also be held electronically if the President is unable to determine the outcome of a vote by show of hands. In the case of a roll call vote, the vote cast by each MEP is recorded in the minutes.

== Technology ==
=== First implementation ===
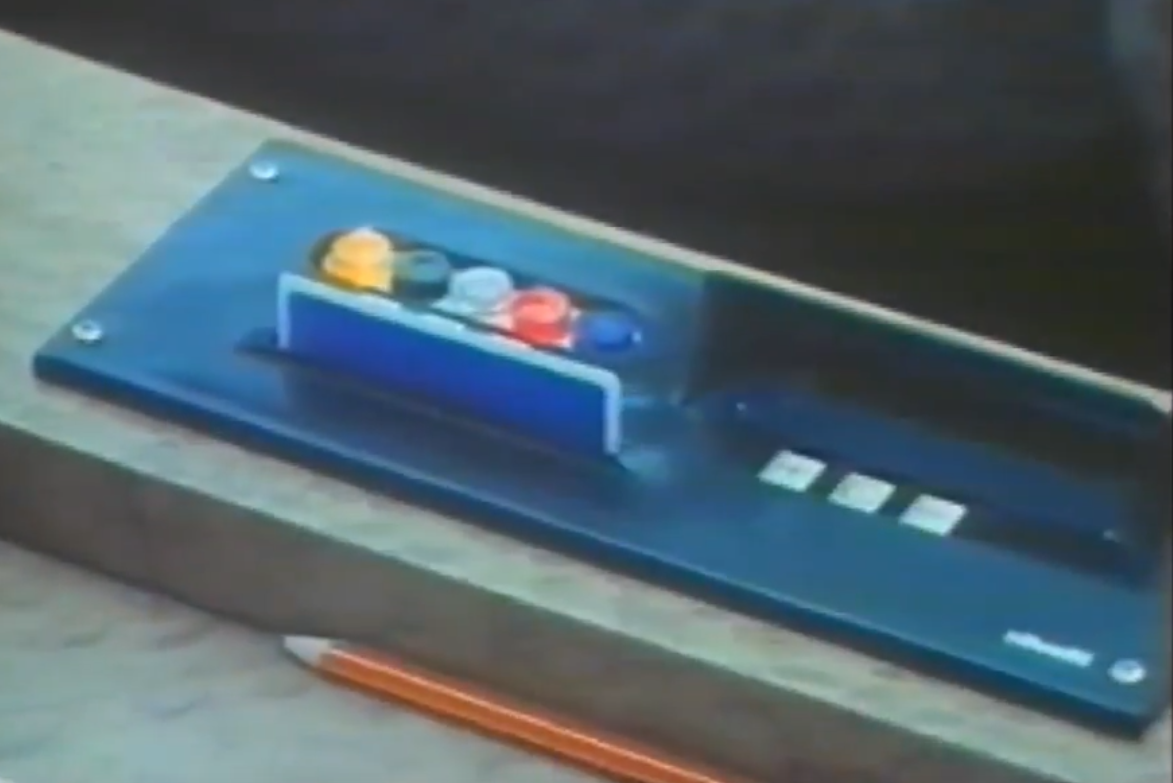
First voting terminal used in the systems in Strasbourg and Luxembourg in 1979

In 1979, the Italian electronics manufacturer Olivetti S.p.A. won the tender to install the first electronic voting systems in the plenary halls of the European Parliament in Strasbourg and Luxembourg City. They consisted of 420 voting terminals, connected by a custom-designed local area network (LAN) to an Olivetti P6060 minicomputer. The terminals contained an Intel 8748 single-chip microcontroller, which controlled the punched card reader, the voting buttons and the display lights, as well as the serial interface to the LAN. The transmission comprised over 10 kilometres (6.2 mi) of unshielded twisted pair Category 3 cable—the same cable used for telephone systems—installed inside the benches of the hemicycles.

=== Intelligent polling unit ===
The first system installed in Strasbourg was used only once for a minor vote, during which the polling of the terminals took so long that President Simone Veil apologized to parliament, saying that "the machine must heat" ("la machine doit chauffer"). It was concluded that the basic software used by the minicomputer was limiting the polling speed. Therefore, an intelligent polling unit with an Intel 8080 microprocessor was installed between the minicomputer and the network of terminals to achieve the full speed of communication needed to meet the requirements of the European Parliament in terms of system execution time.

This unit was first installed in Luxembourg City, where it was used for the first time in 1980 to approve the budget of the European Union during the 3–6 November plenary session. Over 500 roll call votes were held in just four hours. Using the traditional manual procedure, this would have taken approximately two hours per vote. The electronic voting system in Strasbourg was subsequently upgraded with a similar intelligent unit. The P6060 minicomputer was later replaced with a newer model.

The intelligent polling unit also served as a firewall: any command coming from the minicomputer was blocked, except for the basic functions "Open secret vote", "Open clear vote", and "Close vote". The vote results were kept in the polling unit's memory, and only total figures were sent to the minicomputer in case of a secret vote.

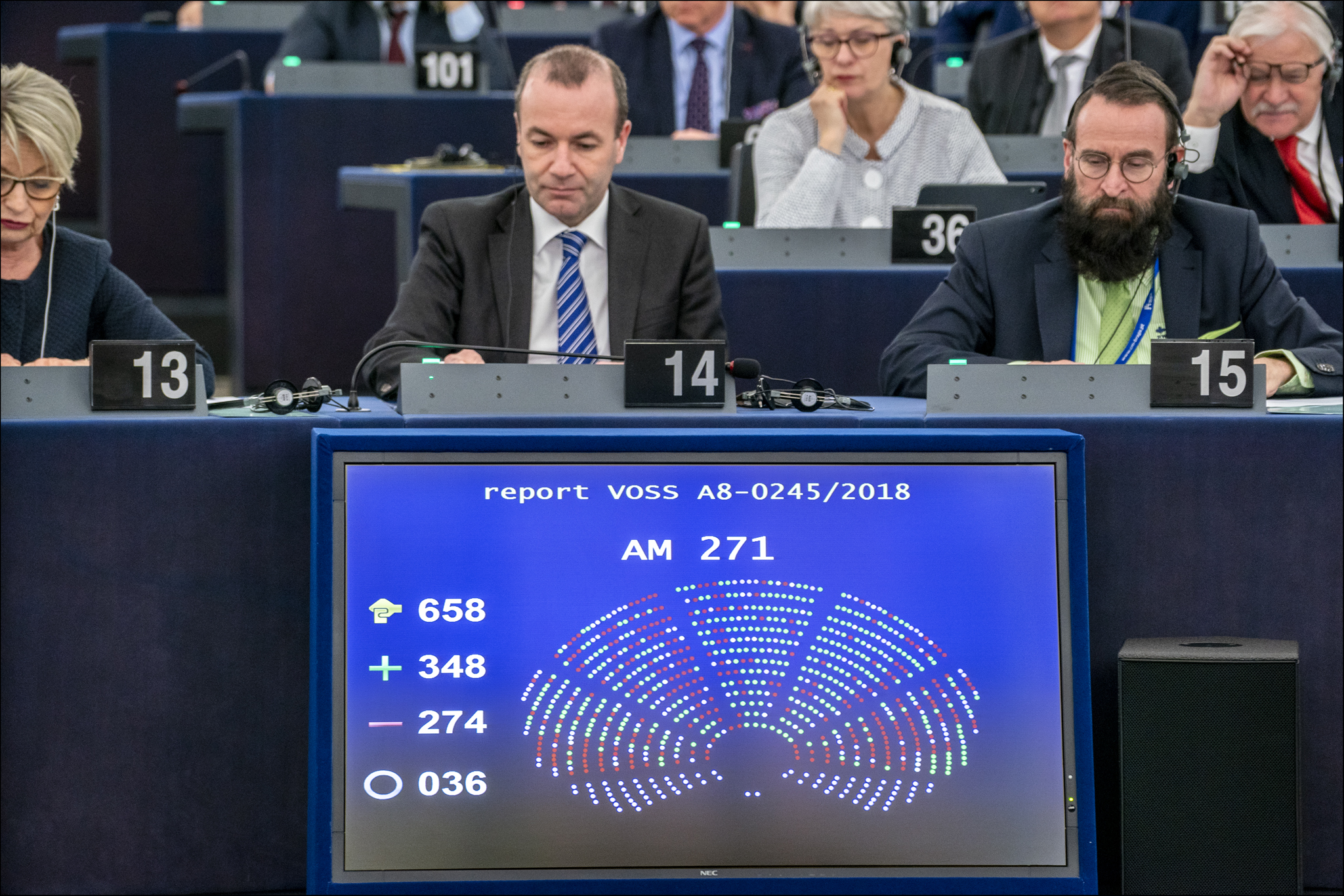
Electronic voting in Strasbourg in 2019

=== Further development ===
Since 1987, the electronic voting systems in the European Parliament have been regularly upgraded and expanded. In the following systems, the company handling maintenance replaced the custom LAN protocol and intelligent polling unit with various internet protocol implementations.
