= Olivetti Envision =

Italian multimedia device

Olivetti Envision (400/P75)
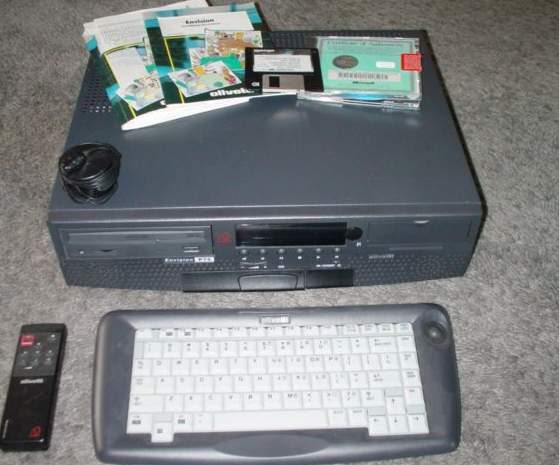
- Manufacturer: Olivetti
- Type: Multimedia personal computer
- Released: 1995; 31 years ago
- Discontinued: 1996; 30 years ago
- Operating system: Windows 95
- CPU: Intel 486 DX4 100 MHz or Intel Pentium P75 processor
- Memory: 8 MB
- Storage: Floppy disk; Hard drive; CD-ROM
- Removable storage: 1.4 MB 3.5" floppy disk; CD-ROM
- Display: VGA monitor, TV; 1024 × 768, 800 × 600
- Graphics: Trident TGV9470
- Sound: Crystal Semiconductor Corporation CS4231 + Oak Mozart OTI 605
- Input: Keyboard, remote
- Connectivity: Parallel, Serial, Modem

The Olivetti Envision (400/P75) was an Italian multimedia personal computer produced in 1995. It came with a choice of two processors: Intel 486 DX4 100 MHz or Intel Pentium P75.

It had an infrared keyboard and internal modem, and it was compatible with audio CDs, CD-ROMs, Photo CDs and Video CDs. Preinstalled software allowed the computer to work as a fax or answering machine when connected to a telephone line.

The Envision had three possible operating modes:

- Simple (limited to the use of an infrared remote control to control the volume and the reproduction of photo, video or audio CDs);
- Intermediate (a simplified Windows shell replacement called Olipilot that gave access to a limited set of programs);
- Advanced (standard Windows 95 graphical user interface).

Designed by Michele De Lucchi, the declared goal for this device was to convince non-computer-savvy people that computers were not impossibly hard to use and could be bought and used like normal home appliances. For this reason, it was intentionally designed to resemble a videocassette recorder more than a computer, and it was equipped with two SCART sockets (to connect it to a TV set), a TV-like remote control, and a slot that could host a satellite TV decoder card.

The Olivetti Envision was discontinued in 1996 due to poor sales caused by its excessive price, many software bugs and limited expandability.

== Technical specifications ==
Sources:

- CPU: Intel 486 DX4 @ 100 MHz or Intel Pentium @ 75 MHz
- RAM: 8 MB
- Graphics: Trident TGV9470 (1 MB, integrated into the motherboard, compatible with Number Nine GXE Graphics Accelerator, Infotronic IPG 64 and Spea Video 7 Mercury)
- Resolutions: 1024 × 768 with 256 colors (monitor), 800 × 600 with 65,536 colors (TV)
- Audio: Crystal Semiconductor Corporation CS4231 + Oak Mozart OTI 605 (compatible with the MPC2 multimedia standard, Roland SCC-1 and Sound Blaster 16)
- Connectors: 3 expansion slots, 2 SCART, audio out, MIDI, VGA out, serial, parallel, modem
- Storage: 1.4 MB 3.5” floppy disk; 635 MB hard disk, CD-ROM drive
- Keyboard: 83 keys infrared keyboard
