= Olivetti =

Italian manufacturer

Olivetti S.p.A.

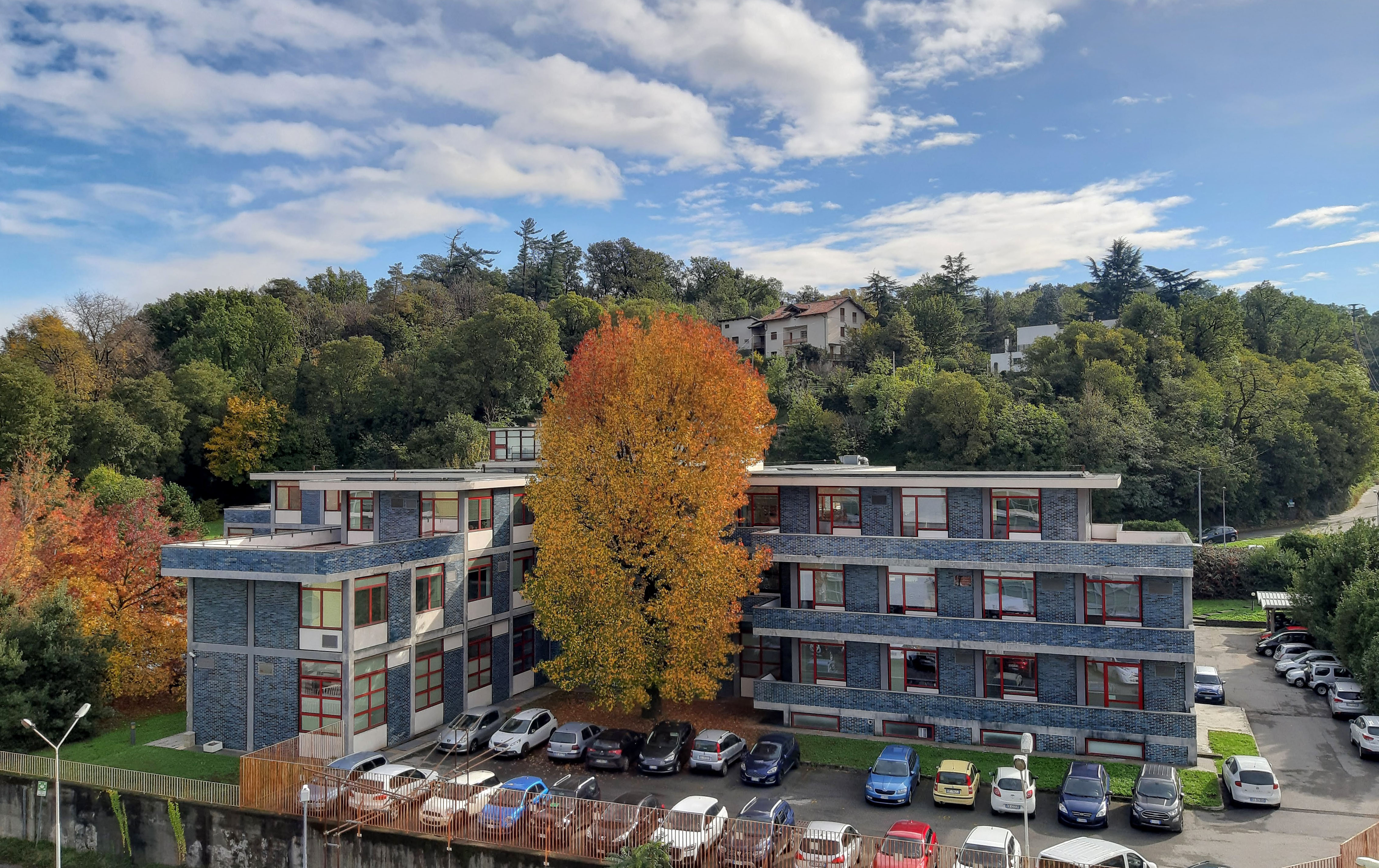
- Olivetti headquarters in Ivrea, Italy
- Type: Subsidiary
- Industry: Information technology
- Founded: 1908; 118 years ago
- Founder: Camillo Olivetti
- Headquarters: Ivrea, Italy
- Area served: Europe and South America
- Key people: Elio Schiavo (chairman); Quang Ngo Dinh (CEO)
- Products: Personal computers; Computer printers; Typewriters; Calculators; Microsystems; Photocopiers; Computer peripherals; Hardware
- Revenue: €227 million (2014)
- Owner: TIM (100%)
- Number of employees: 582 (2014)
- Parent: TIM
- Website: www.olivetti.com

Olivetti S.p.A. is an Italian manufacturer of computers, tablets, smartphones, printers and other such business products as calculators and fax machines. Headquartered in Ivrea, in the Metropolitan City of Turin, the company has been owned by TIM S.p.A. since 2003.

The company is known for innovative product design, ranging from the 1950s Lettera 22 portable typewriter, to some of the first commercial programmable desktop calculators, such as the 1964 Programma 101, as well as the pop-art inspired Valentine typewriter of 1969. Between 1954 and 2001, Italy's Association of Industrial Design (ADI) awarded 16 Compasso d'Oro prizes to Olivetti products and designs – more than any other company or designer. At one point in the 1980s, Olivetti was the world's third largest personal computer manufacturer and remained the largest such European manufacturer during the 1990s.

== History ==
=== Founding ===
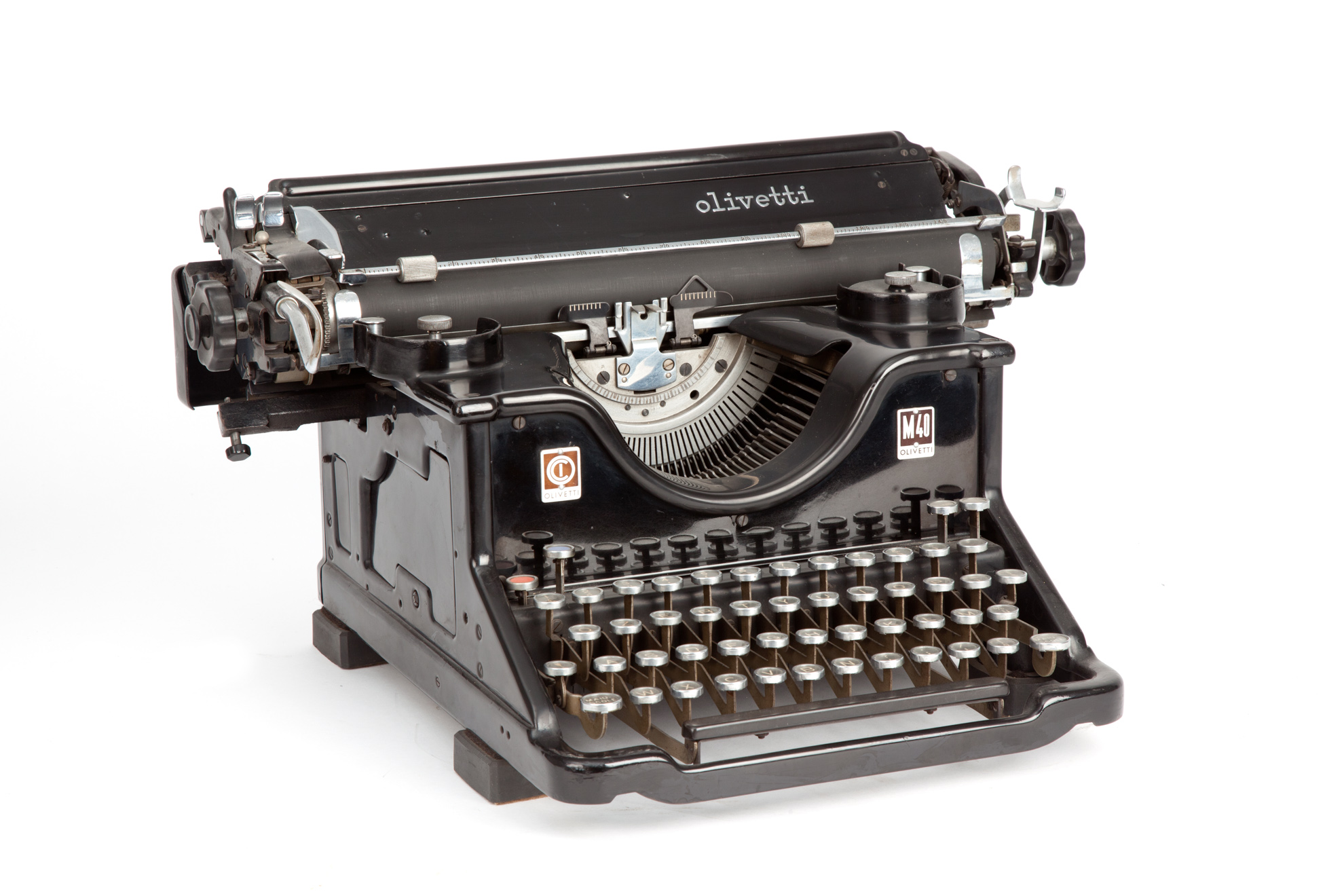
Olivetti M40 typewriter (1930), designed by Camillo Olivetti with Gino Levi Martinoli (Museo nazionale della scienza e della tecnologia Leonardo da Vinci, Milan)

The company was founded as "Ing. C. Olivetti & C., S.p.A." by Camillo Olivetti in 1908 in the Turin commune of Ivrea, Italy. Olivetti was initially a typewriter manufacturer. The firm was mainly developed by his son Adriano Olivetti.

Olivetti opened its first overseas manufacturing plant in 1930, and its Divisumma electric calculator was launched in 1948. It inspired Thomas J. Watson Jr. to change IBM's approach to industrial design beginning in the 1950s. In 1959, Olivetti produced Italy's first electronic computer, the transistorised Elea 9003, and bought the Underwood Typewriter Company. It sold its electronics division to General Electric as required by banks for new loans. But it continued to develop new computing products, including Programma 101, one of the first commercially produced programmable calculators. In the 1970s and 1980s, Olivetti was the biggest manufacturer of office machines in Europe and 2nd biggest PC vendor in Europe after IBM.

In 1980, Olivetti began distributing in Indonesia through Dragon Computer & Communication.

In 1981, Olivetti installed the electronic voting systems for the European Parliament in Strasbourg and Luxembourg.

In 1986, the company acquired Triumph-Adler, a major office equipment manufacturer based in Germany that also produced typewriters, from Litton Industries of the United States. With this acquisition, Olivetti grabbed 50 percent of the European typewriter market.

In September 1994, the company launched Olivetti Telemedia chaired by Elserino Piol.

Since 2003, Olivetti has been part of the Telecom Italia Group through a merger.

=== Design ===
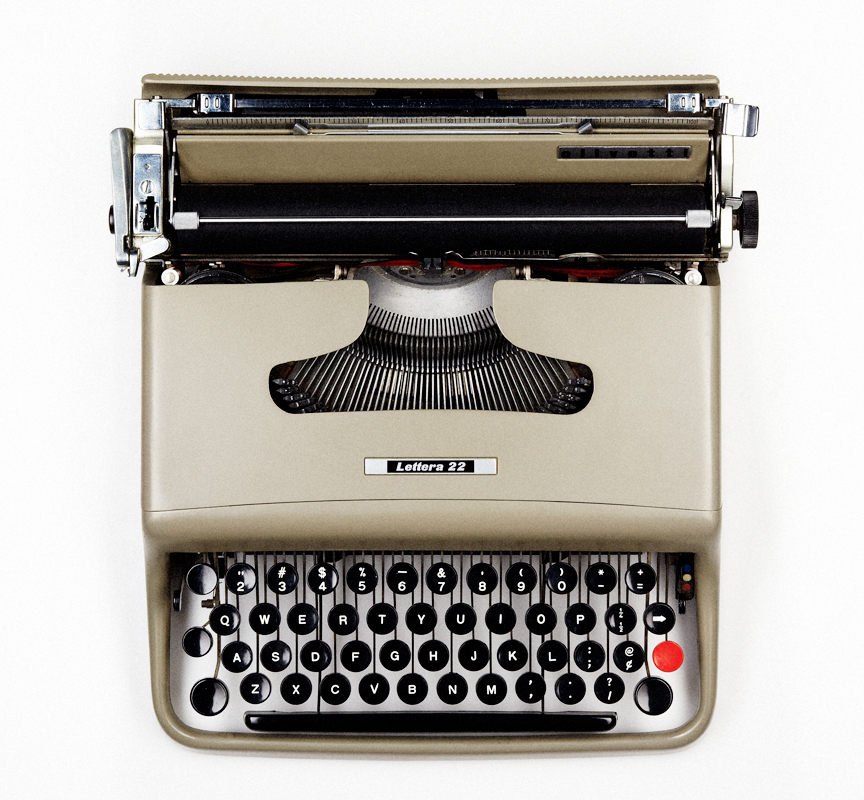
The Olivetti Lettera 22 typewriter, designed by Marcello Nizzoli in 1950

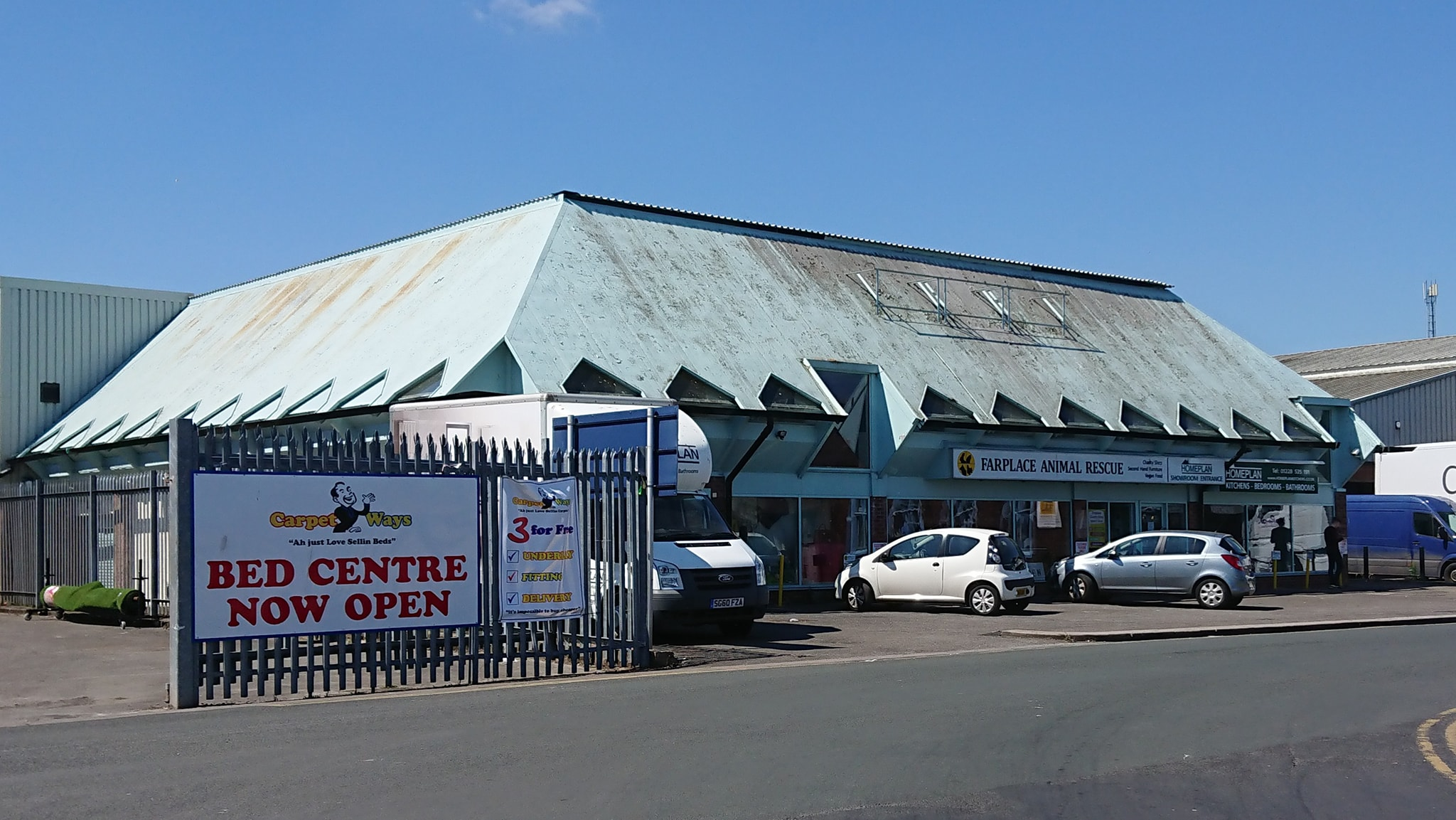
Former Olivetti branch in Carlisle, UK

[A] preoccupation with design developed into a comprehensive corporate philosophy, which embraced everything from the shape of a space bar to the color scheme for an advertising poster.

— Jonathan Martin, International Directory of Company Histories, Olivetti S.p.A., vol. 34, p.316

Olivetti became famous for the meticulous attention it paid to the design of its products, through collaborations with notable architects and designers, over a nearly 60-year period starting in the late 1930s. An early example is the portable 1932 Olivetti MP1 (Modello Portatile in Italian).

From the 1940s to the 1960s, Olivetti industrial design was led by Marcello Nizzoli, who was responsible for the Lexicon 80 and the portable Lettera 22 typewriters, which were released in 1948 and 1950 respectively. The architect and designer Ettore Sottsass began consulting for Olivetti in the late 1950s and designed a series of products including the Tekne 3 typewriter in 1958, the Elea 9003 computer in 1959, and later, the Praxis 48 typewriter in 1964 and the Valentine portable typewriter in 1969.

In 1954, Mario Tchou joined Olivetti and was in put in charge of a team responsible for creating a commercial computer. In 1957, the team created the Elea 9001. Tchou went on to lead a team of 500 engineers, and decided to include transistors in the Elea 9003.

Mario Bellini joined Sottsass at Olivetti in 1963. He designed the Programma 101 (1965), the Divisumma 18 (1973), and the Logos 68 (1973) calculators, and in 1966 the TCV-250 video display terminal. Mario Bellini and Ettore Sottsass, who by then directed design for Olivetti, hired designers such as George Sowden and James Irvine. Sowden worked for Olivetti from 1970 until 1990 and designed the company's first desktop computer, the Olivetti L1, in 1978 (following ergonomic research lasting two years). In 1991, Sowden's design for the Olivetti fax OFX420 won the ADI Compasso d'Oro Award. In 1999 Michele De Lucchi designed the Art Jet 10 inkjet printer, which was also awarded the Compasso d'Oro, and in 2001, the Gioconda calculator.

In 1952, the Museum of Modern Art in New York (MoMA) held an exhibit titled "Olivetti: Design in Industry". Another exhibit was mounted by the Musée des Arts Décoratifs in Paris in 1969 and later toured five other cities. Many Olivetti products and archival material related to design are held in museum collections including the MoMA design collection, the Cooper Hewitt in New York, and the Centre Pompidou in Paris. Between 1954 and 2001, Olivetti won 16 Compasso d'Oro awards for design. In May 2022, ADI Design Museum in Milan paid tribute to this achievement with an exhibition titled Podium 16.

Olivetti paid attention to more than product design. Graphic design and architectural design was also considered pivotal to the company, which engaged architects and designers such as Gae Aulenti, Walter Ballmer, BBPR, Egon Eiermann, Figini e Pollini, Ignazio Gardella, Louis Kahn, Le Corbusier, Carlo Scarpa, Giovanni Pintori, Bob Noorda, and Lella and Massimo Vignelli to design factories, office buildings, showrooms, and publicity materials.

Giovanni Pintori was hired by Adriano Olivetti in 1936 to work in the publicity department. Pintori was the creator of the Olivetti logo and many promotional posters used to advertise the company and its products. During his activity as Art Director from 1950, Olivetti's graphic design obtained several international awards, and he designed works that created the Olivetti image and became emblematic Italian reference in the history of 20th-century design.

Those designers also created the Olivetti Synthesis office furniture series which mainly were used to be installed in the firm's own headquarters, worldwide branch offices and showrooms. Olivetti also produced some industrial production machinery, including metalworking machines of the Horizon series.

=== Typewriters ===
First poster of the Olivetti M1 typewriter (1912)

Olivetti began with mechanical typewriters when the company was founded in 1909, and produced them until the mid-1990s. Until the mid-1960s, they were fully mechanical, and models such as the portable Olivetti Valentine were designed by Ettore Sottsass.

With the Tekne/Editor series and Praxis 48, some of the first electromechanical typewriters were introduced. The Editor series was used for speed typing championship competition. The Editor 5 from 1969 was the top model of that series, with proportional spacing and the ability to support justified text borders. In 1972 the electromechanical typeball machines of the Lexicon 90 to 94C series were introduced, as competitors to the IBM Selectric typewriters, the top model 94c supported proportional spacing and justified text borders like the Editor 5, as well as lift-off correction.

In 1978 Olivetti was one of the first manufacturers to introduce electronic daisywheel printer-based word processing machines, called TES 401 and TES 501. Later the ET series typewriters without (or with) LCD and different levels of text editing capabilities were popular in offices. Models in that line were ET 121, ET 201, ET 221, ET 225, ET 231, ET 351, ET 109, ET 110, ET 111, ET 112, ET 115, ET 116, ET 2000, ET 2100, ET 2200, ET 2250, ET 2300, Et 2400 and ET 2500. For home users in 1982 the Praxis 35, Praxis 40 and 45D were some of the first portable electronic typewriters. Later, Olivetti added the Praxis 20, ET Compact 50, ET Compact 60, ET Compact 70, ET Compact 65/66, the ET Personal series and Linea 101. The top models were 8 lines LCD based portables like Top 100 and Studio 801, with the possibility to save the text to a 3.5-inch floppy disk.

The professional line was upgraded with the ETV series video typewriters based on CP/M operating system, ETV 240, ETV 250, ETV 300, ETV 350 and later MS-DOS operating system based ETV 260, ETV 500, ETV 2700, ETV 2900, ETV 4000s word processing systems having floppy drives or hard disks. Some of them (ETV 300, 350, 500, 2900) were external boxes that could be connected through an optional serial interface to many of the ET series office typewriters, the others were fully integrated with an external monitor which could be installed on a holder over the desk. Most of the ET/ETV/Praxis series electronic typewriters were designed by Marion Bellini.

By the 1970s and 1980s, the typewriter market had matured under the market dominance of large companies from Europe and the United States. Before the advent of daisy wheels and electronic machines (and subsequently the personal computers and word processing software) — Olivetti and the other major manufacturers faced strong competition from typewriters from Asia, including Brother Industries and Silver Seiko Ltd. of Japan.

By 1994, Olivetti stopped production of typewriters, as most users had transitioned to personal computers.

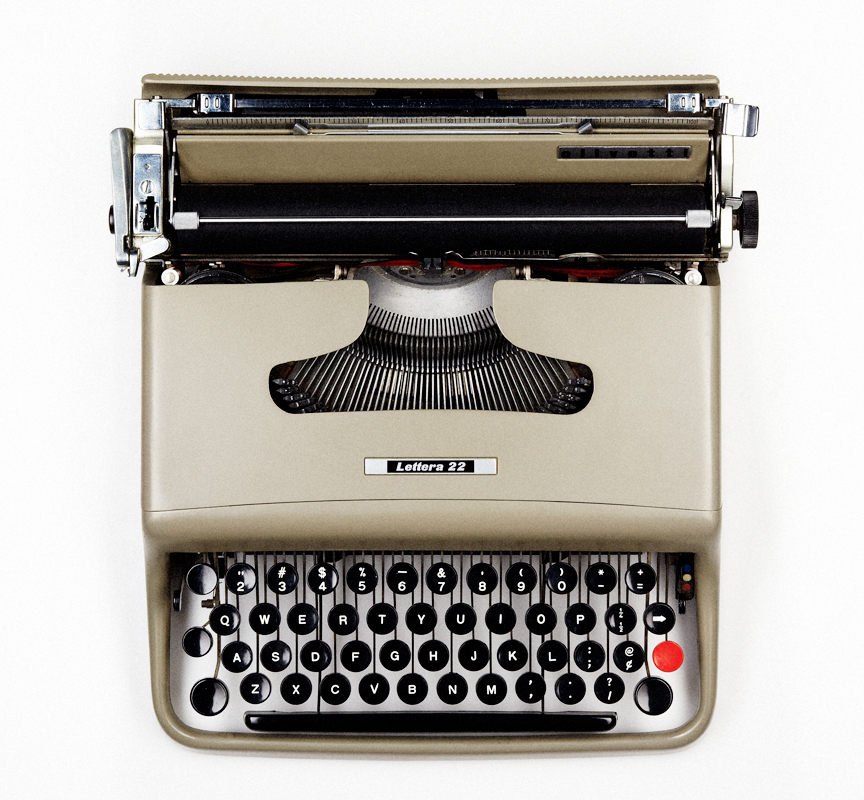
Olivetti Lettera 22 Typewriter (Marcello Nizzoli)

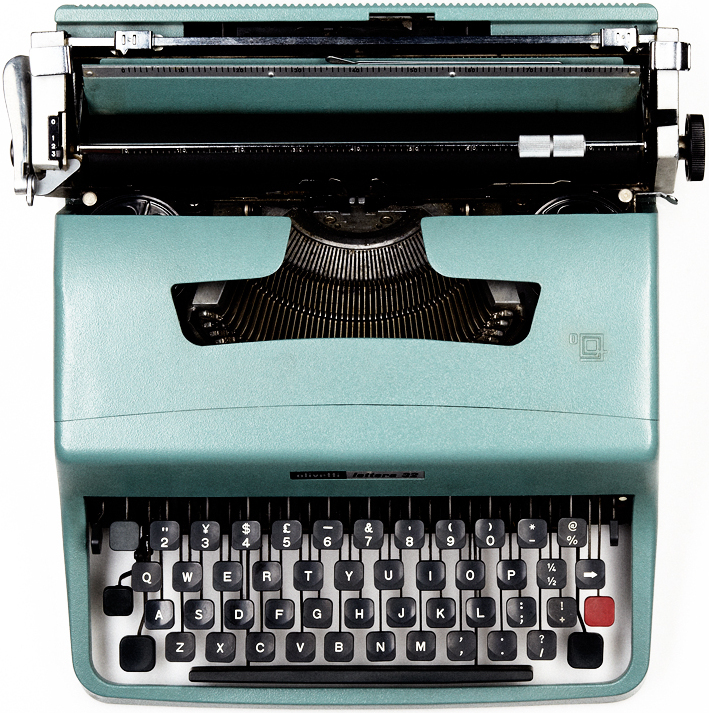
Olivetti Lettera 32 Typewriter

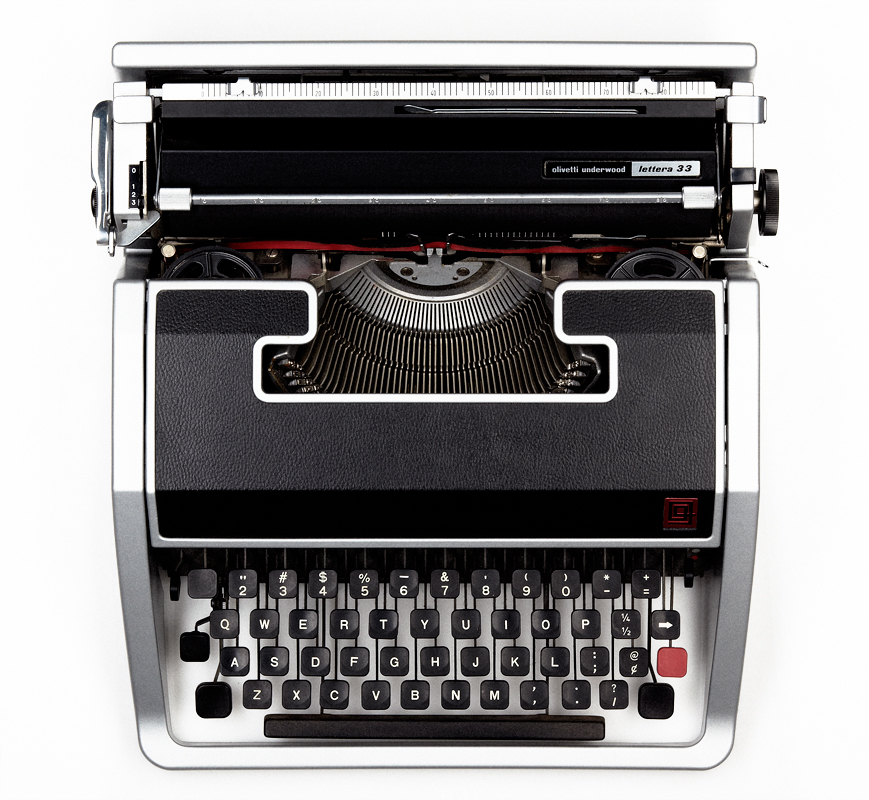
Olivetti Lettera 33 Typewriter (Ettore Sottsass)

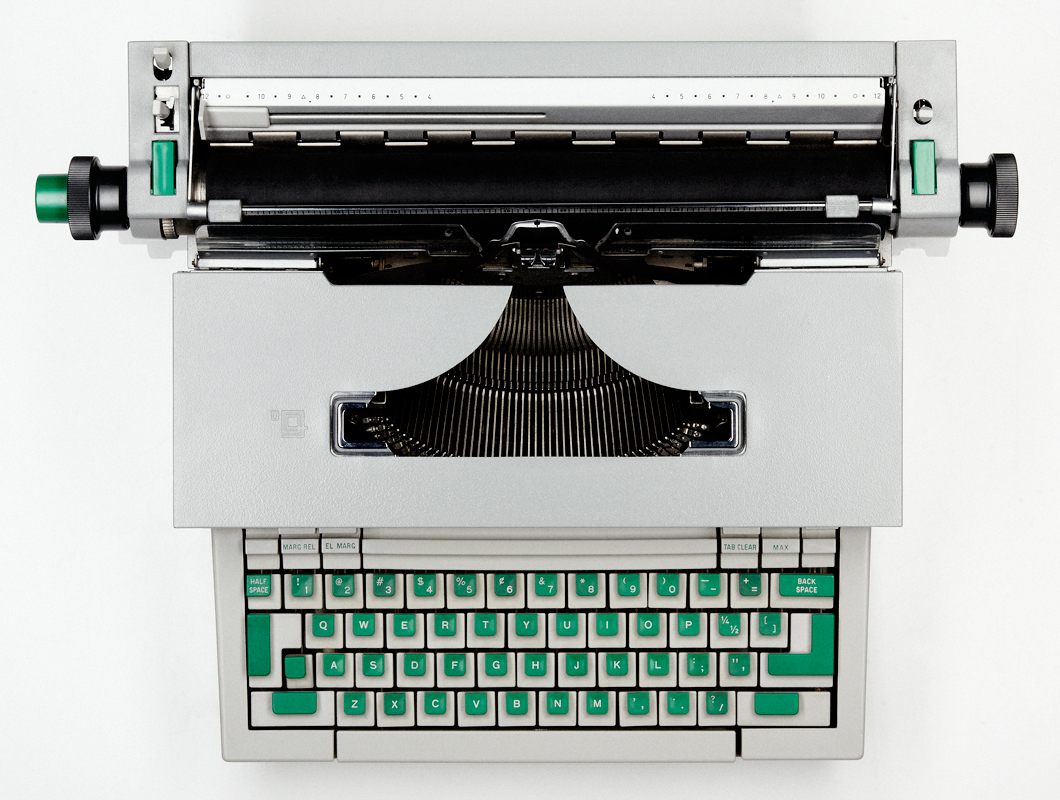
Olivetti Praxis 48 Typewriter (Ettore Sottsass)

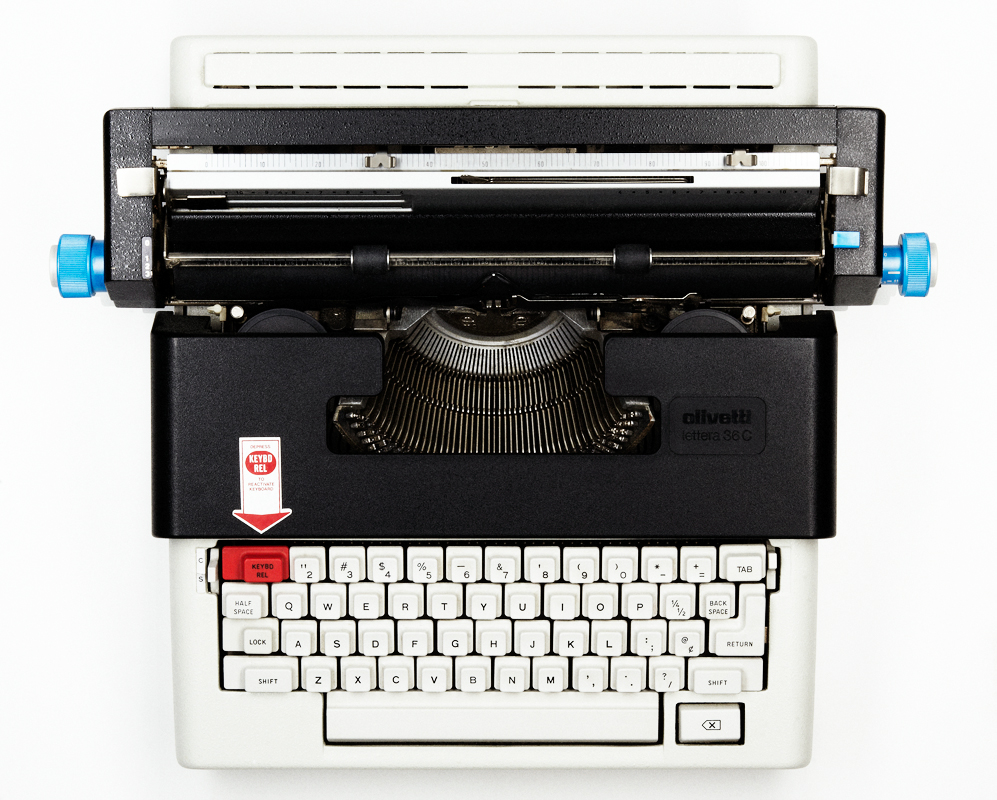
Olivetti Lettera 36c Typewriter (Mario Bellini)

Olivetti Lettera 35i (Mario Bellini)

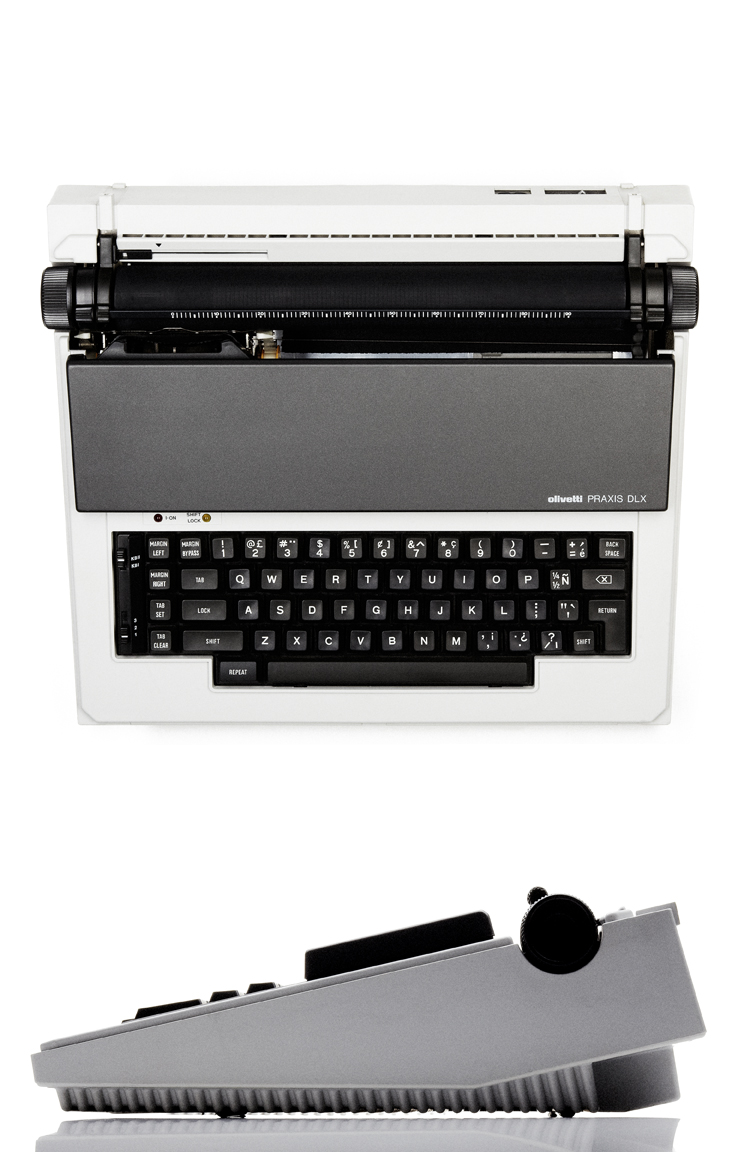
Olivetti Lettera Praxis DLX (Mario Bellini design)

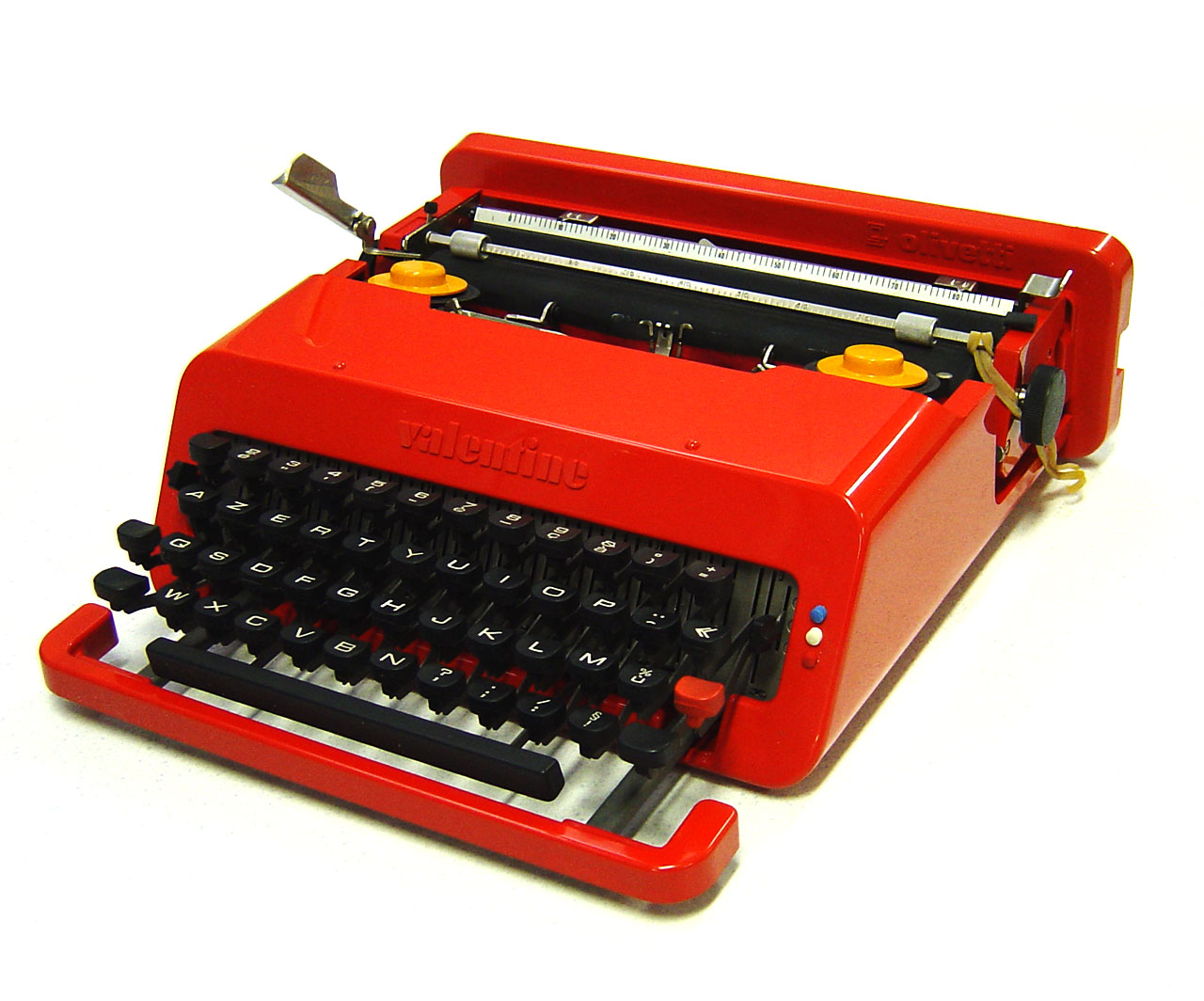
Olivetti Valentine (Ettore Sottsass with Perry A. King, Albert Leclerc)

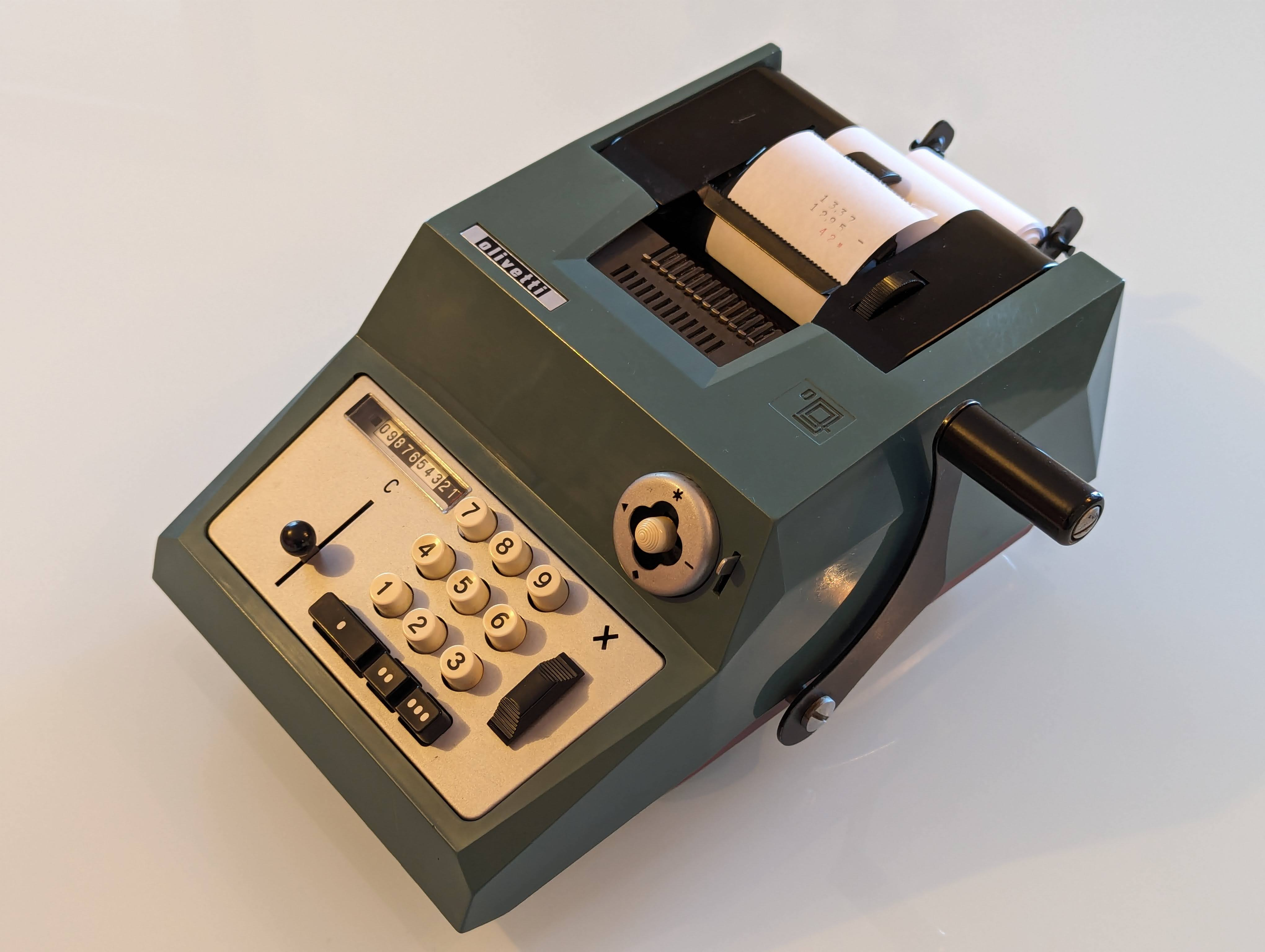
Olivetti Summa Prima 20

=== Computers ===
Between 1955 and 1964 Olivetti developed some of the first transistorized mainframe computer systems, such as the Elea 9003. Although 40 large commercial 9003 and over 100 smaller 6001 scientific machines were completed and leased to customers to 1964, low sales, loss of two key managers and financial instability caused Olivetti to withdraw from the field in 1964.

In 1965 Olivetti released the Programma 101, considered one of the first commercial desktop programmable calculators. It was saved from the sale of the computer division to GE thanks to an employee, Gastone Garziera, who spent successive nights changing the internal categorization of the product from "computer" to "calculator", so leaving the small team in Olivetti and creating some awkward situations in the office, since that space was now owned by GE. In 1974 the firm released the TC800, an intelligent terminal designed to be attached to a mainframe and used in the finance sector. It was followed in 1977 by the TC1800.

During the 1970s Olivetti also manufactured and sold two ranges of minicomputers. The 'A' series started with the typewriter-sized A4 through to the large A8, and the desk-sized DE500 and DE700 series.

Olivetti's first modern personal computer, the M20, featuring a Zilog Z8000 CPU, was released in 1982. The M20 was followed in 1983 by the M24, a clone of the IBM PC using DOS and the Intel 8086 processor (at 8 MHz) instead of the Intel 8088 used by IBM (at 4.77 MHz). The M24 was sold in North America as the AT&T 6300. Olivetti also manufactured the AT&T 6300 Plus, which could run both DOS and Unix. The M24 in the US also was sold as Xerox 6060. The Olivetti M28 was the firm's first PC to have the Intel 80286 processor. The same year Olivetti produced its M10 laptop computer, an 8085-based workalike of the successful Radio Shack TRS-80 Model 100, which it marketed in Europe. These were the first laptops to sell in million-unit quantities, though the Olivetti M10 itself only attained sales figures in the tens of thousands and went out of production within two years.

During the 1980s and 1990s, Olivetti continued to release PC-compatible machines, facing mounting competition from other brands. It turned to producing laptops: in 1991 it introduced the D33, a laptop in a carry case, and later the M111, M211, S20, D33, Philos and Echos series. A very interesting subnotebook was the Quaderno, about the same size as an A5 paper – it was the grandfather of netbook computers introduced 20 years later.

Olivetti tried to recover its position by introducing the Envision in 1995, a full multimedia PC to be used in a living room; this project was a failure. Gateway also introduced a similar product in the U.S., called the Destination 2000, around the same period, to a similarly mixed commercial reception.

The company continued to develop personal computers until it sold its PC business in 1997.

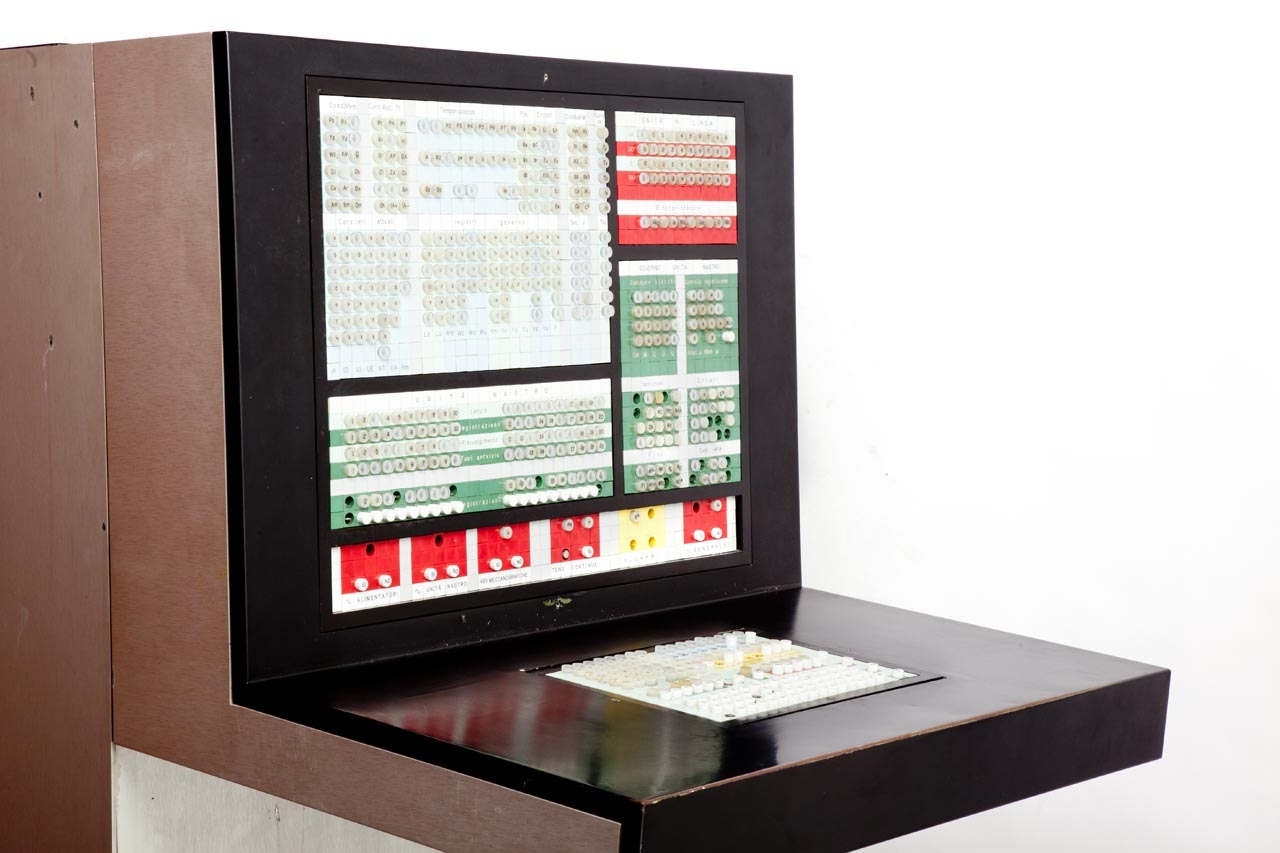
Olivetti Elea 9003

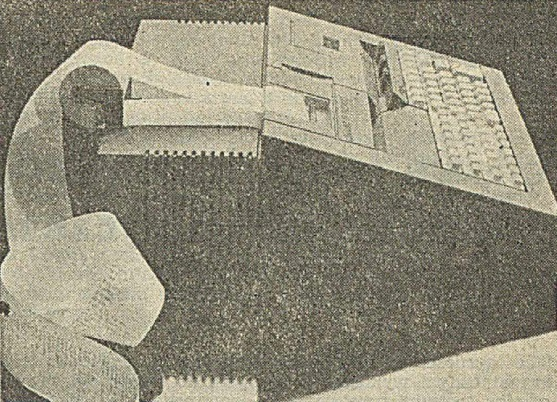
Olivetti P6040

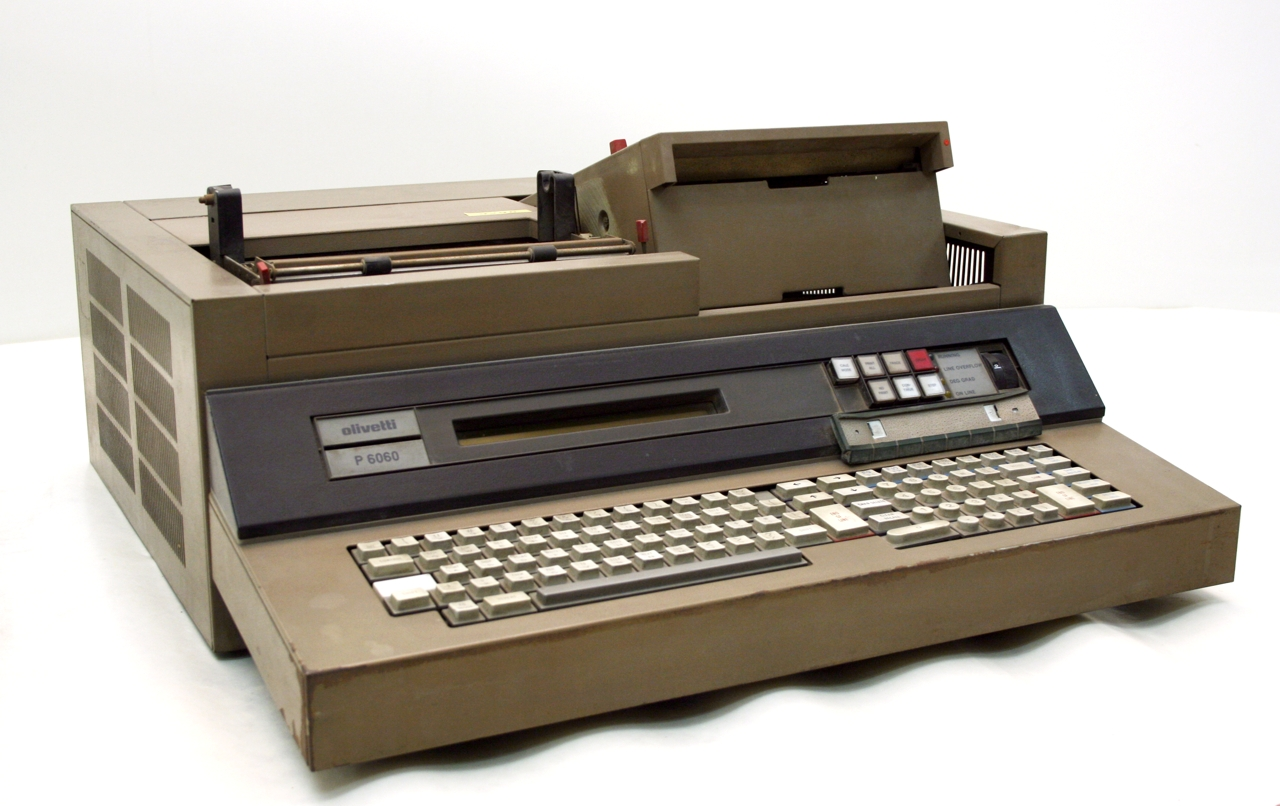
Olivetti P6060

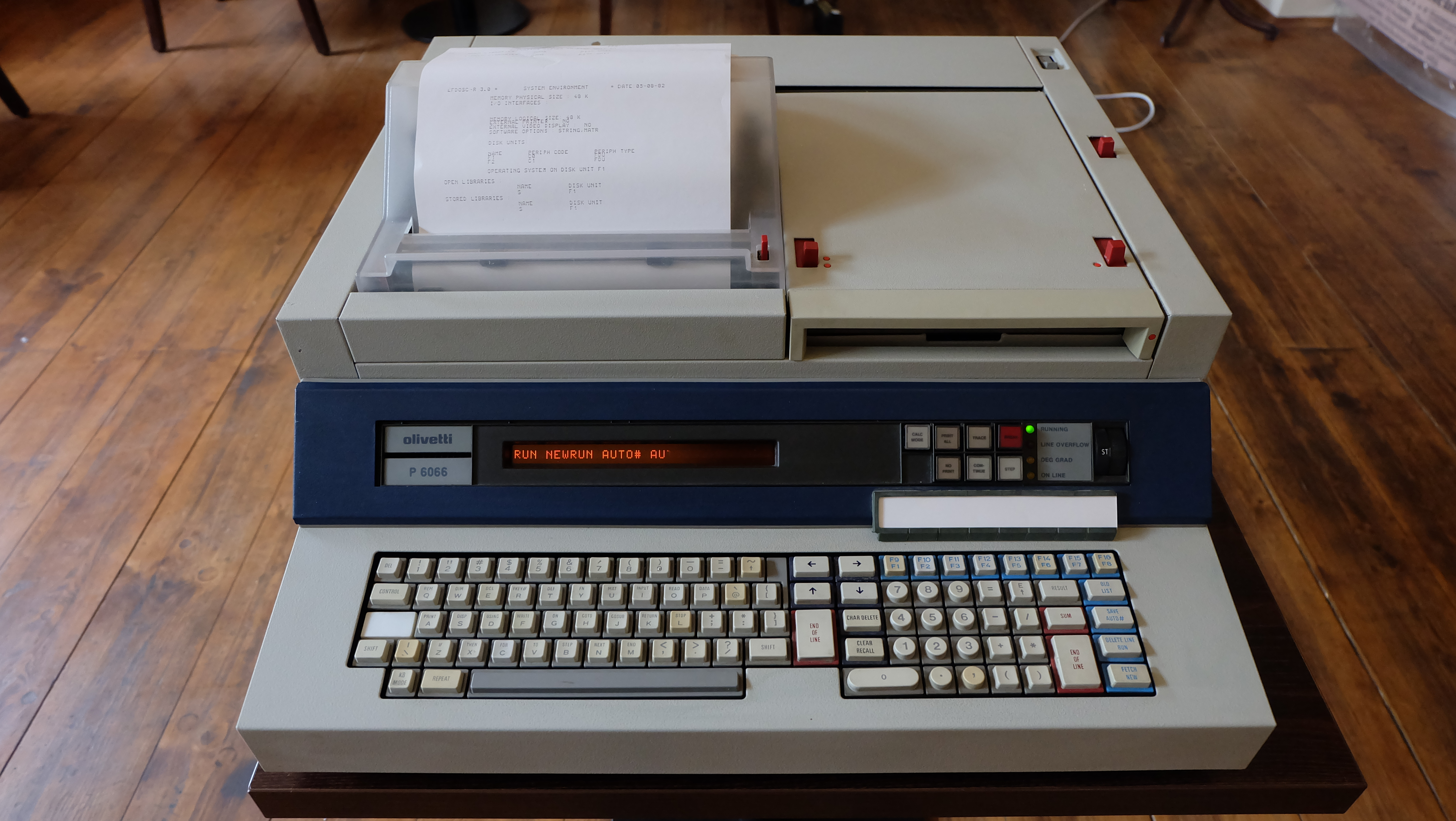
Olivetti P6066

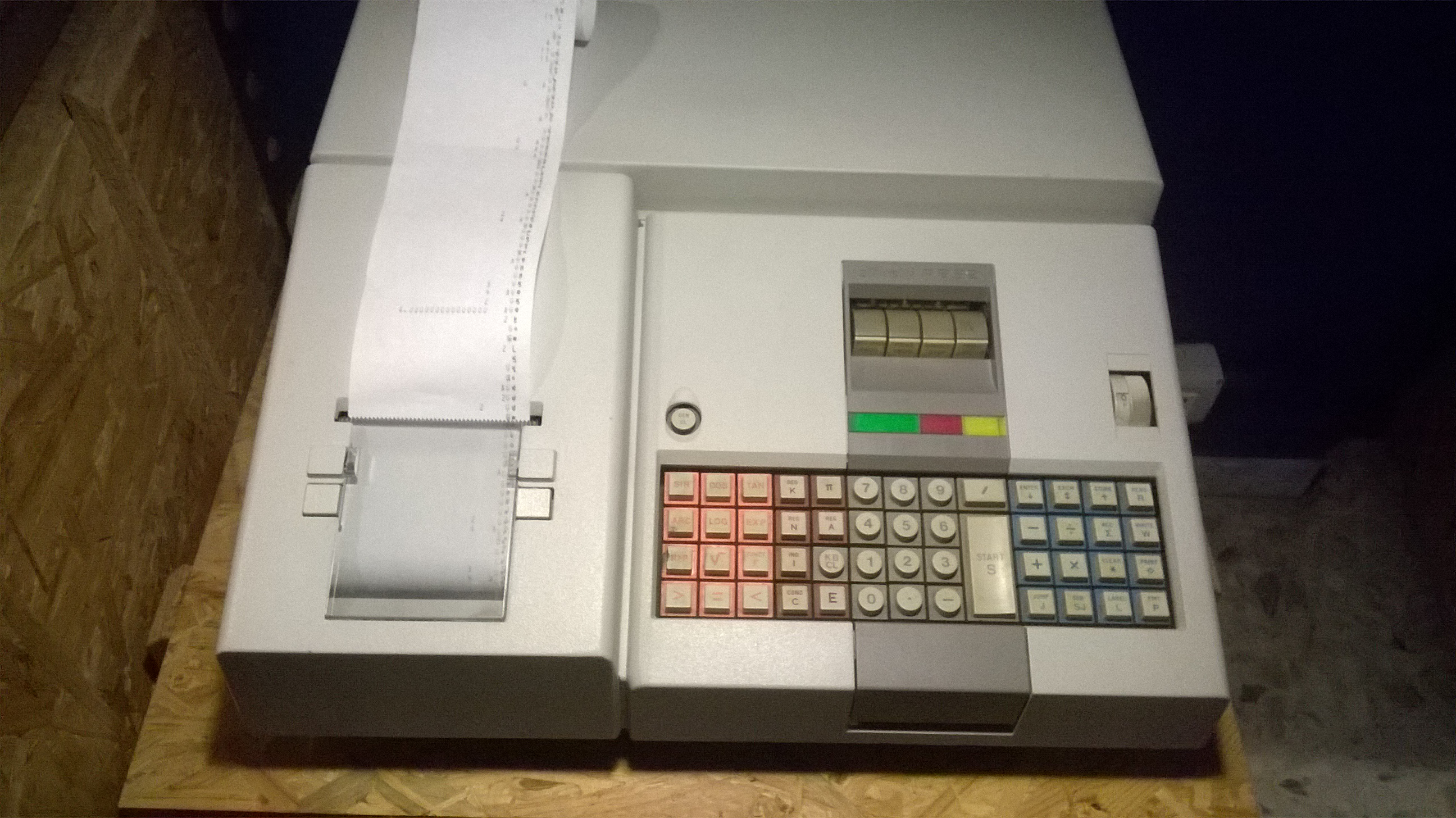
Olivetti P652

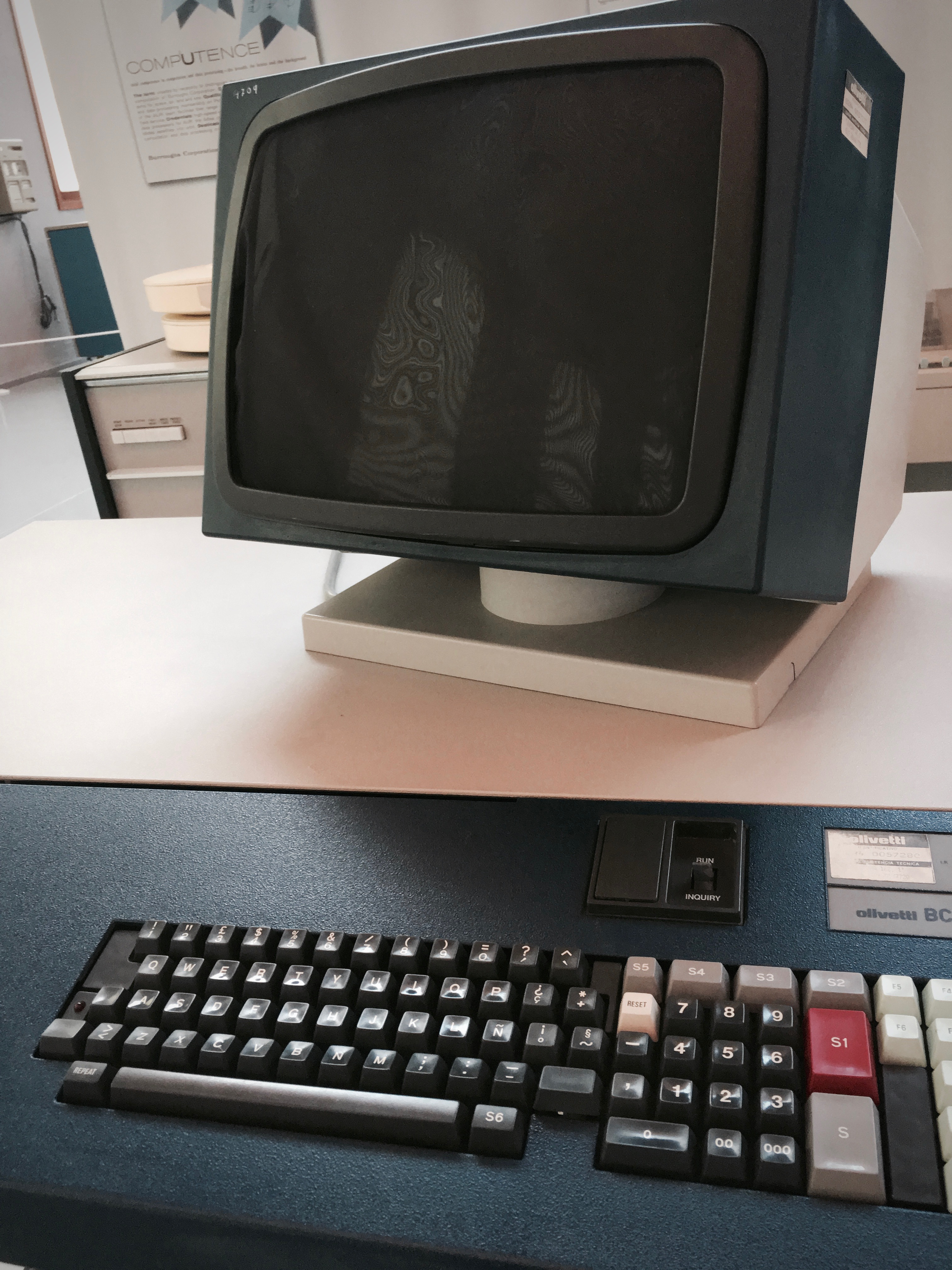
Olivetti BCS 2035

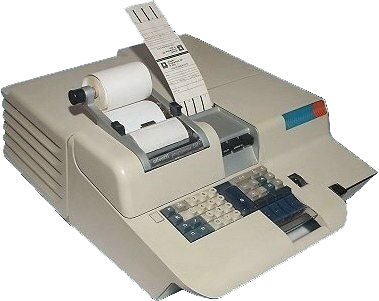
Olivetti Programma 101

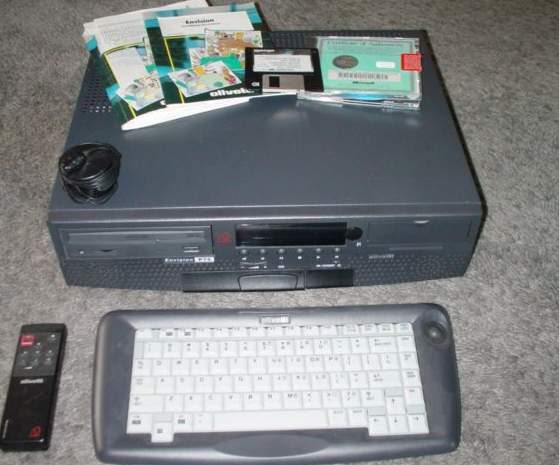
Olivetti Envision P75

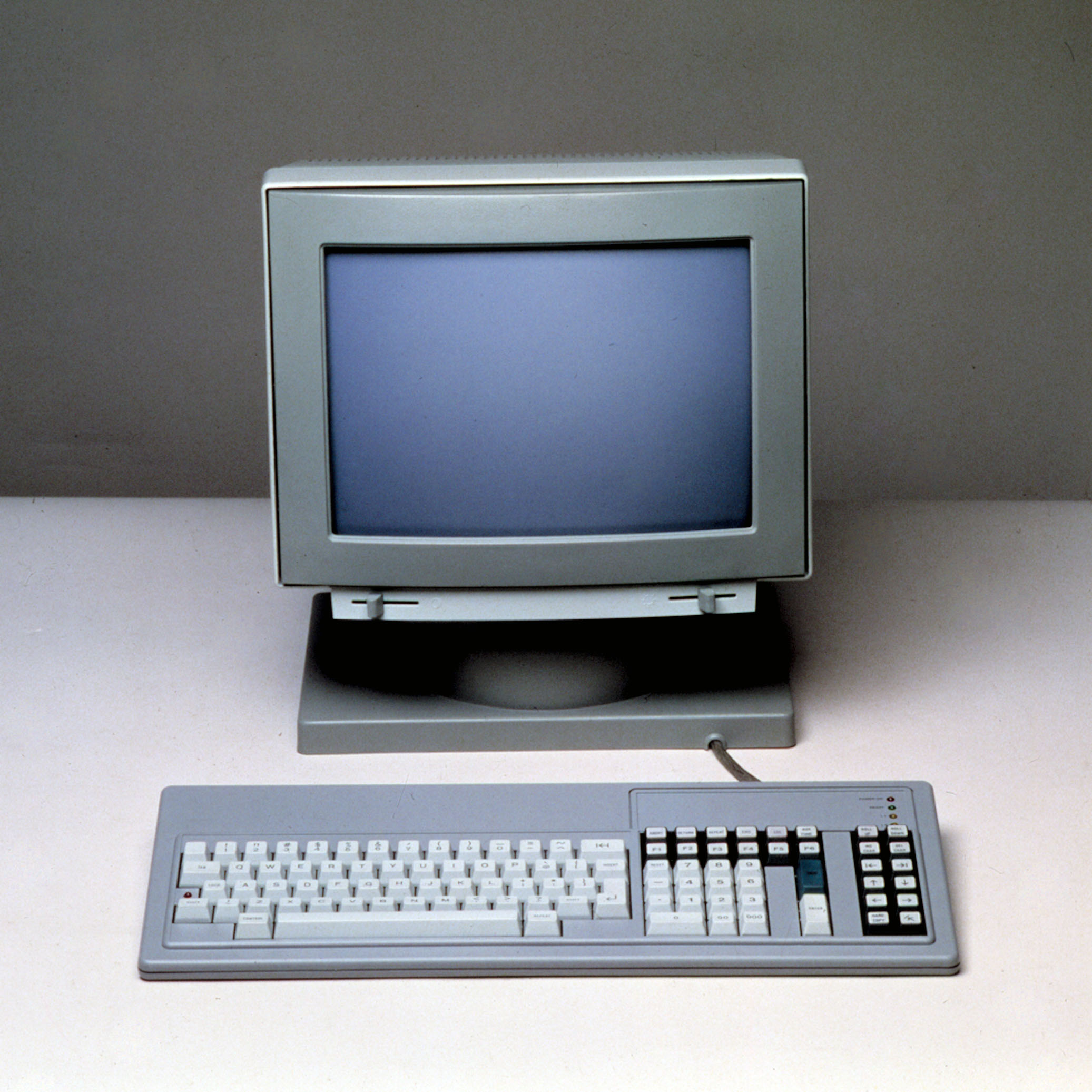
Olivetti L1

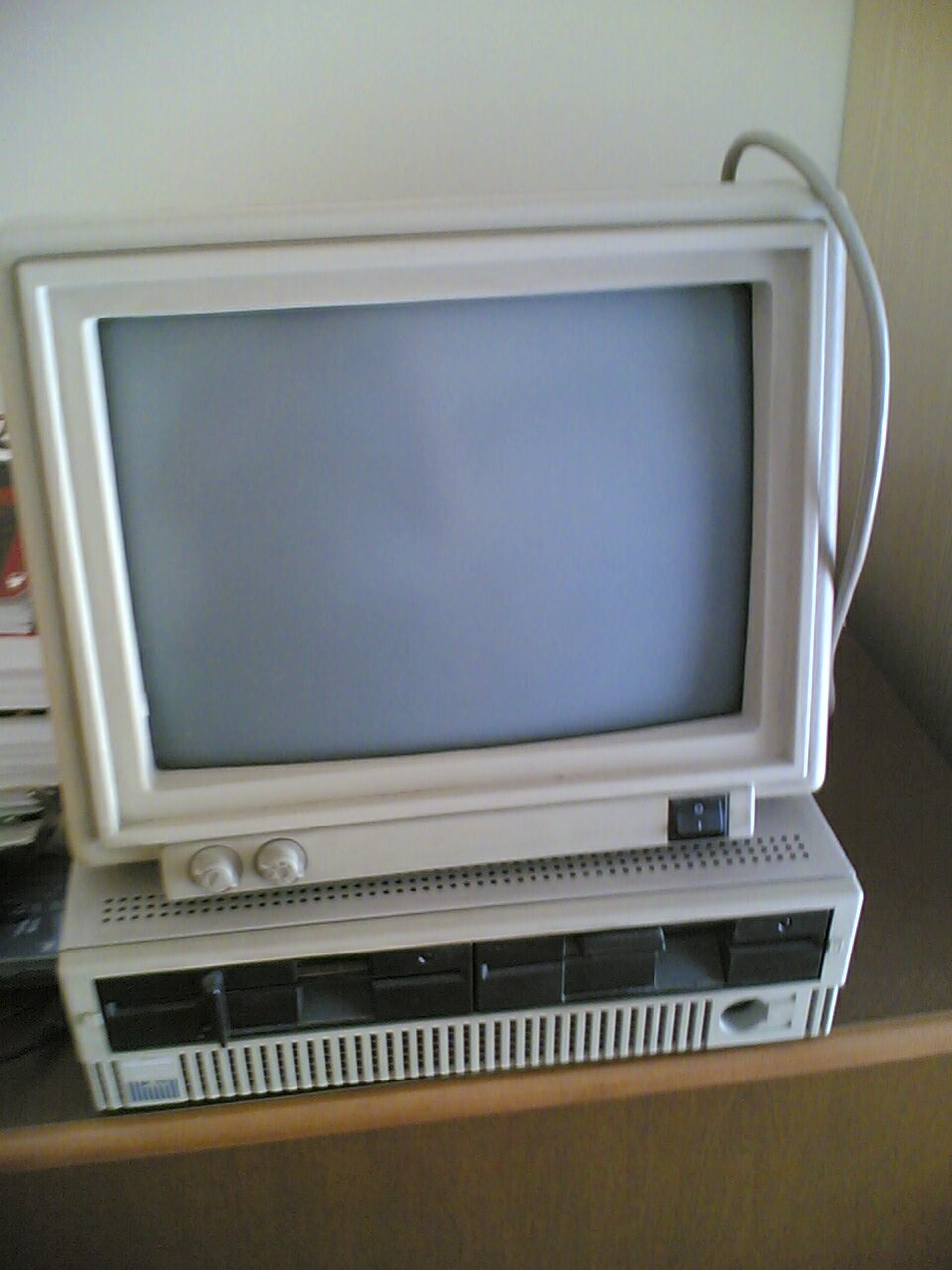
Olivetti M19

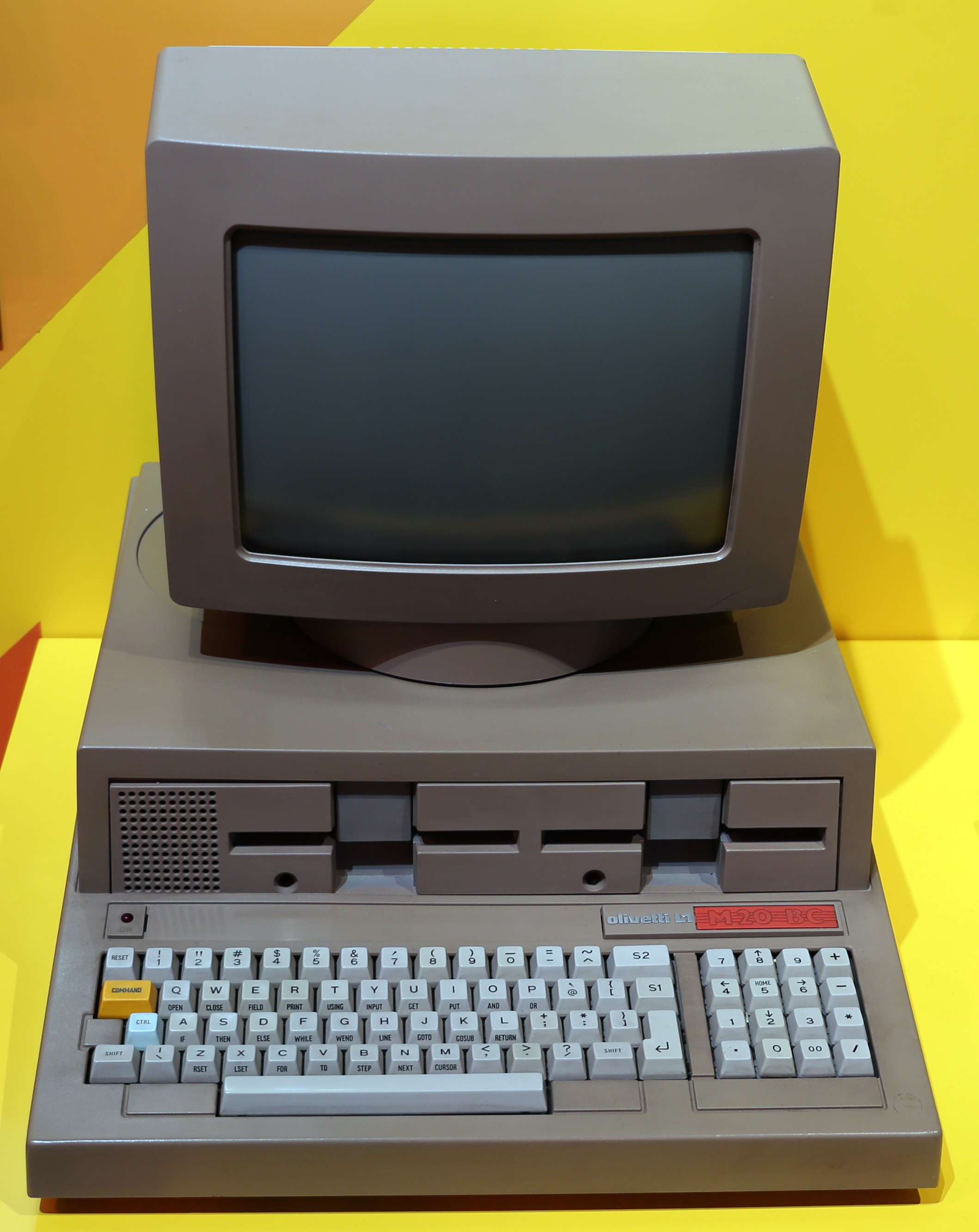
Olivetti M20

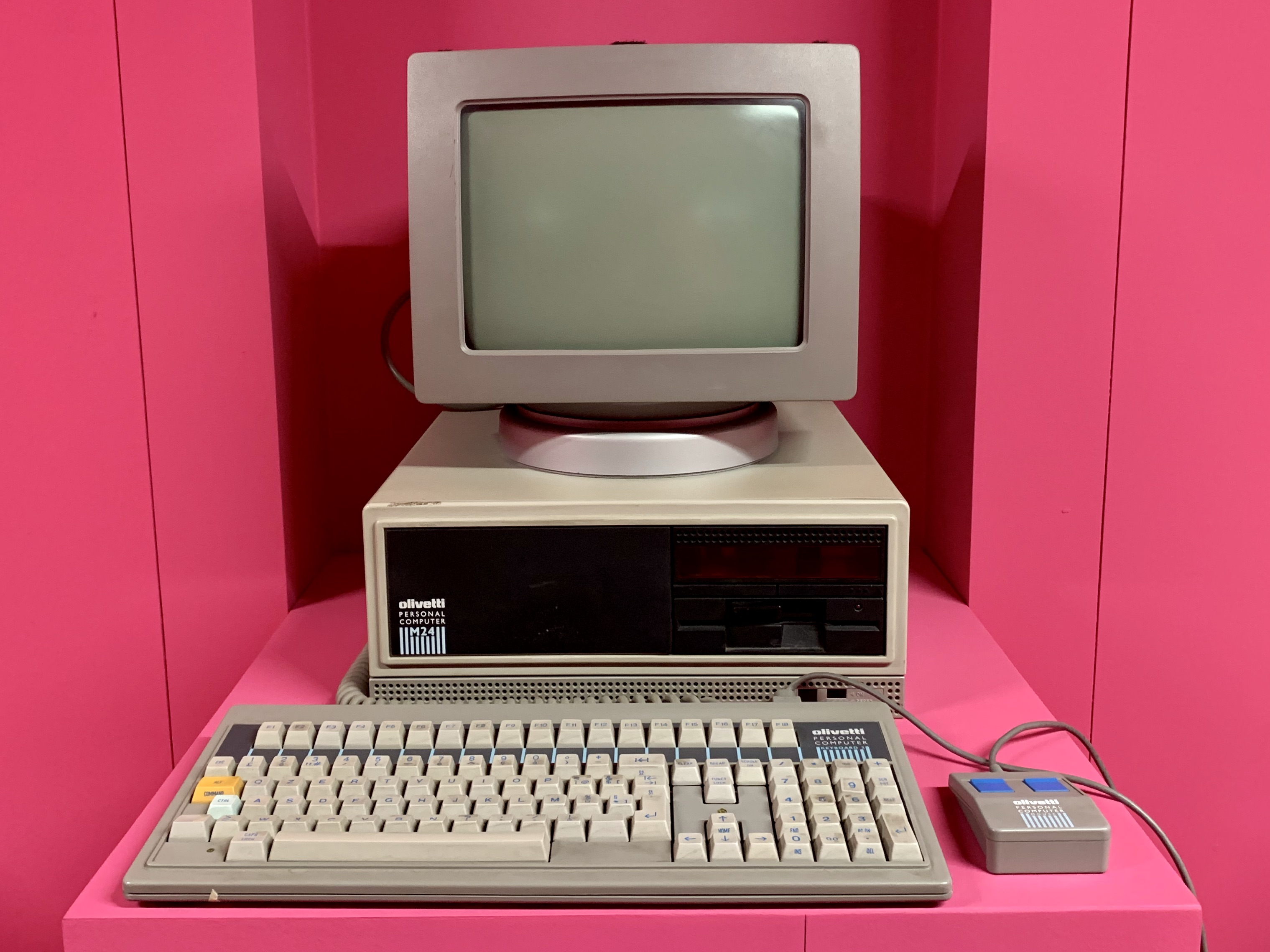
Olivetti M24

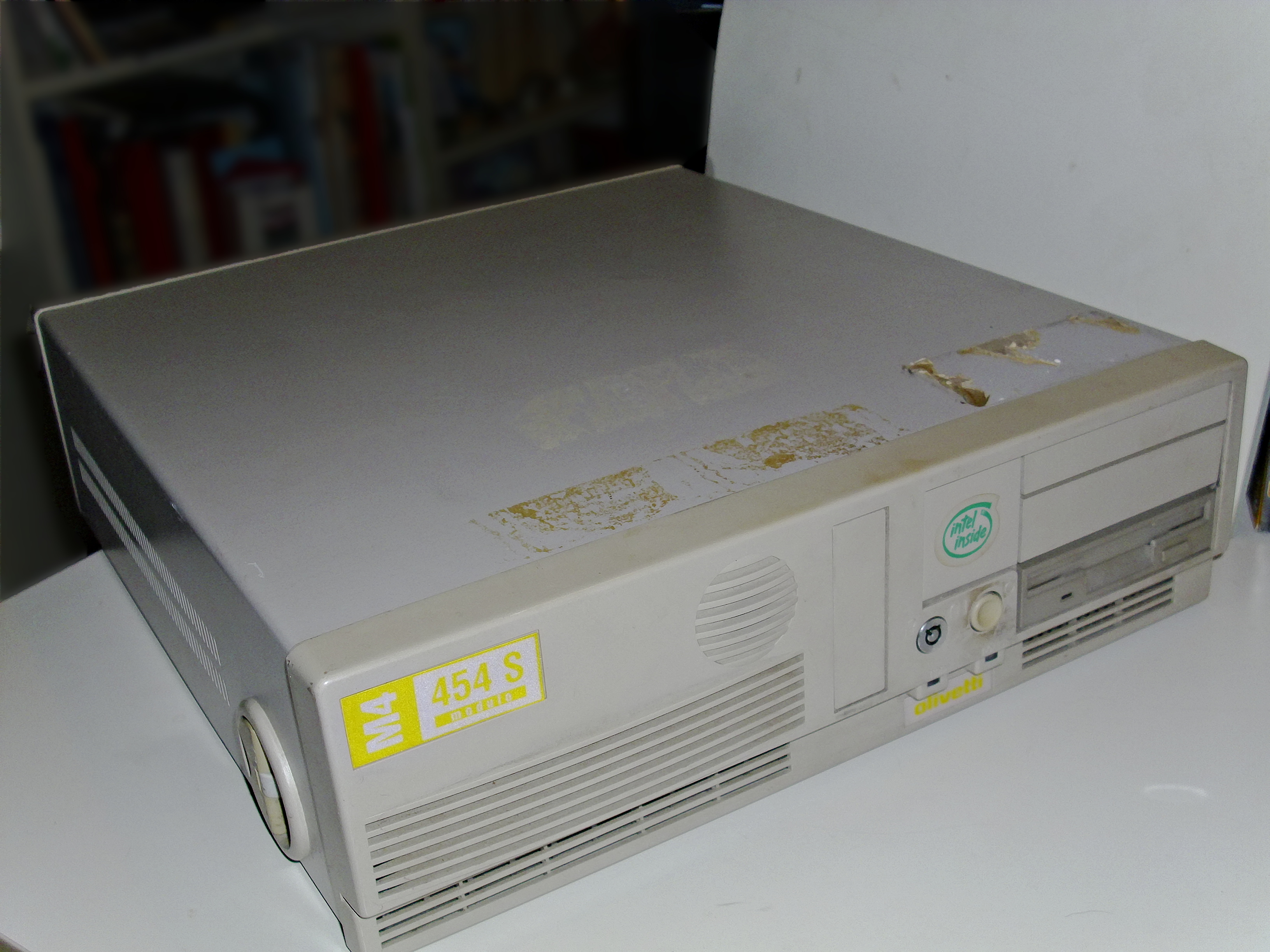
Olivetti M4 454S

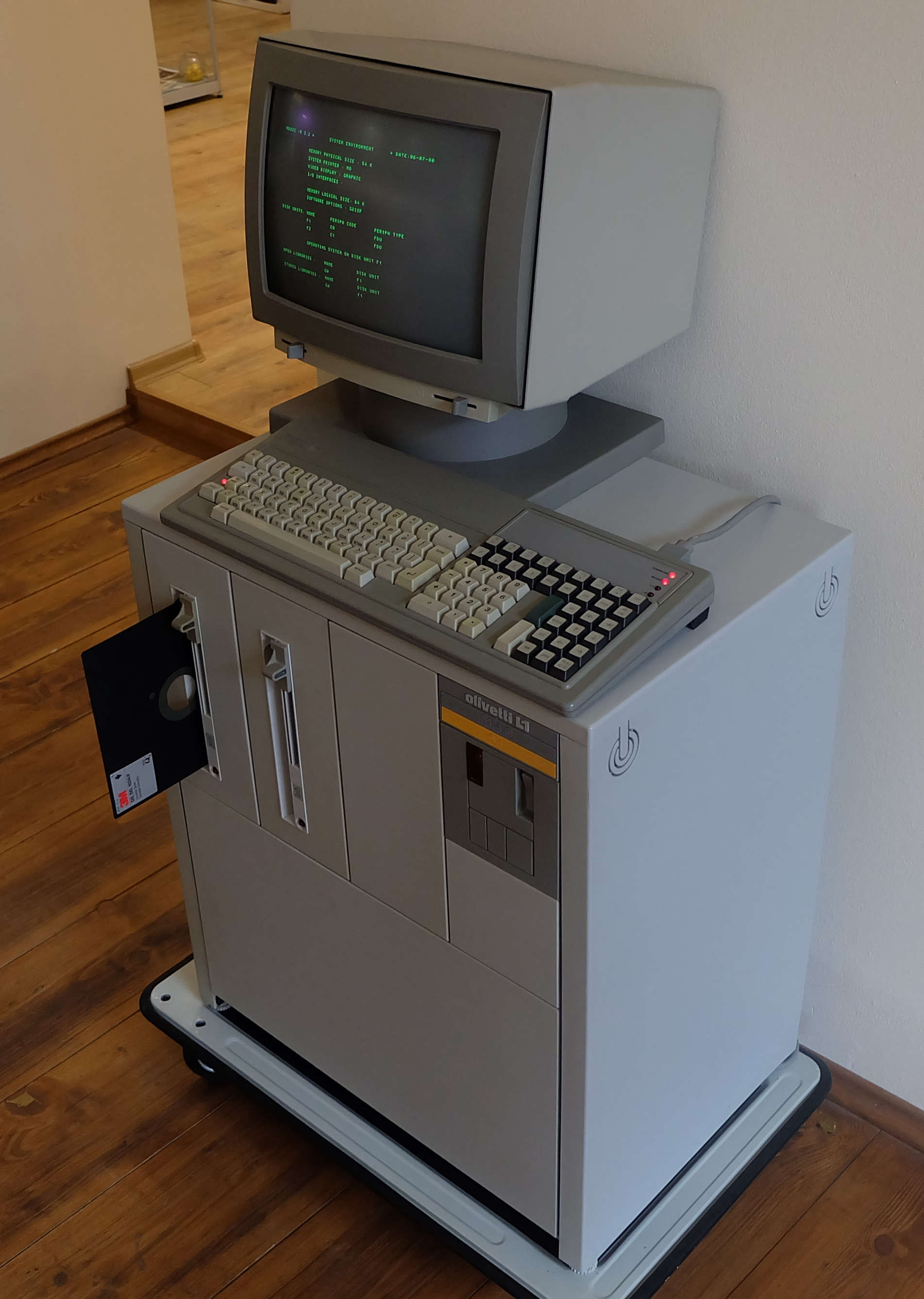
Olivetti L1 M40 ST

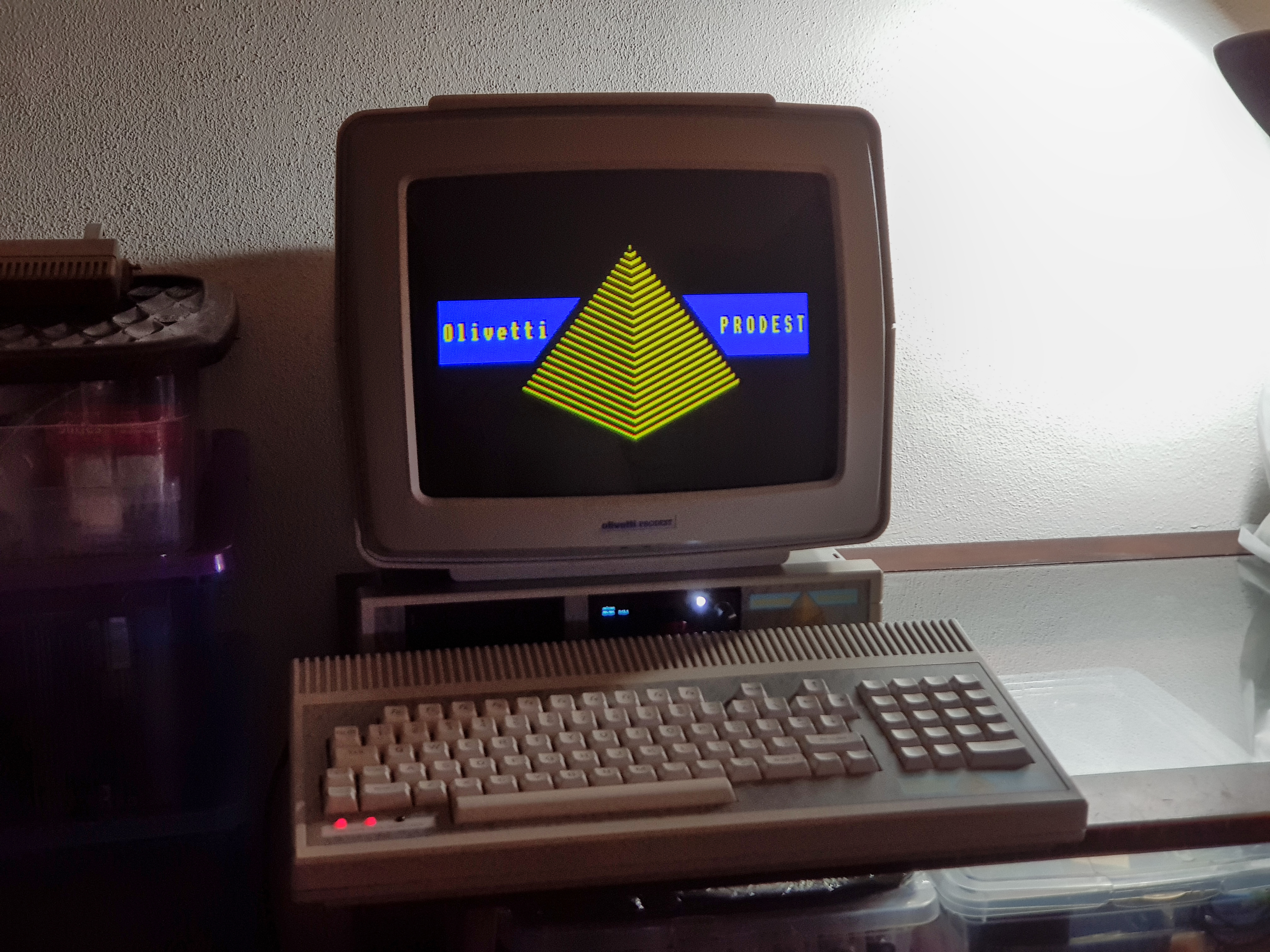
Olivetti Prodest PC128

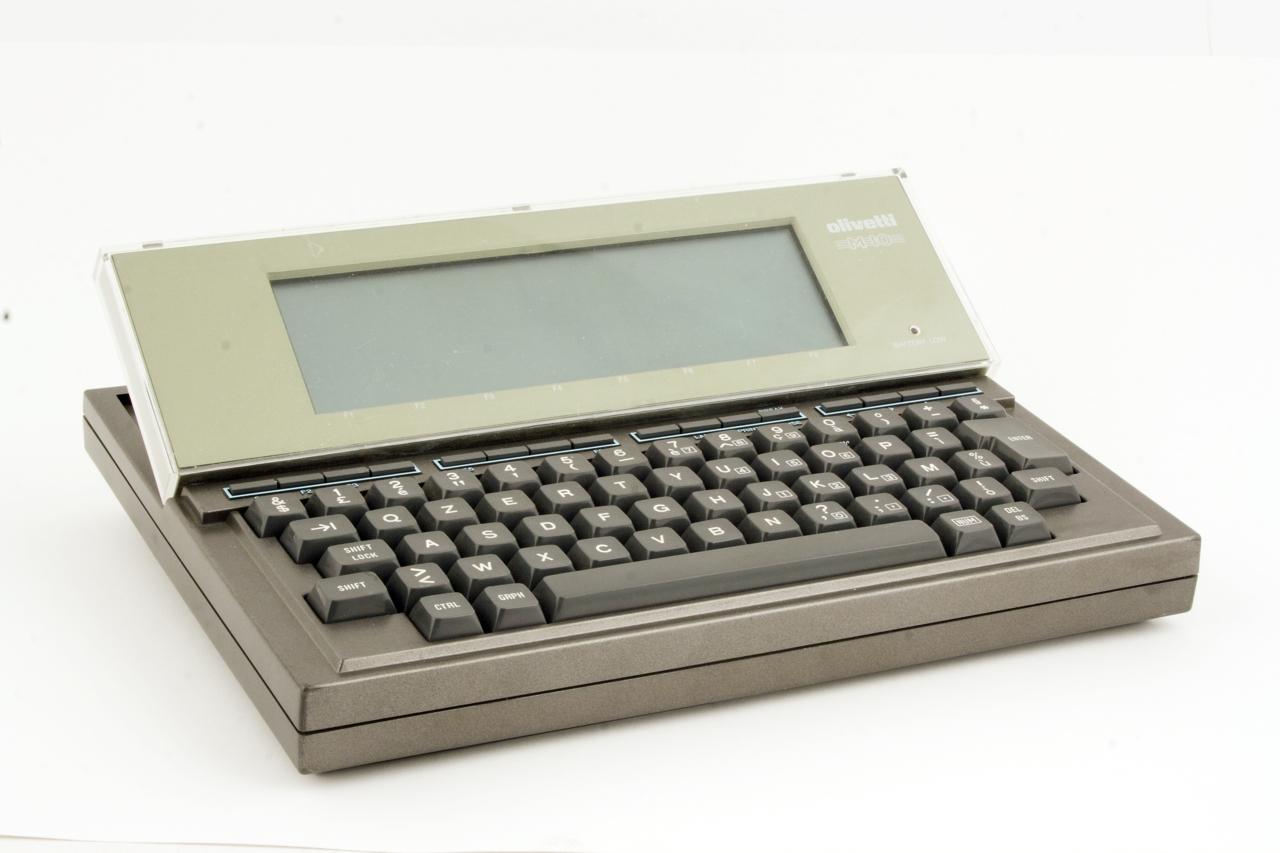
Olivetti M10

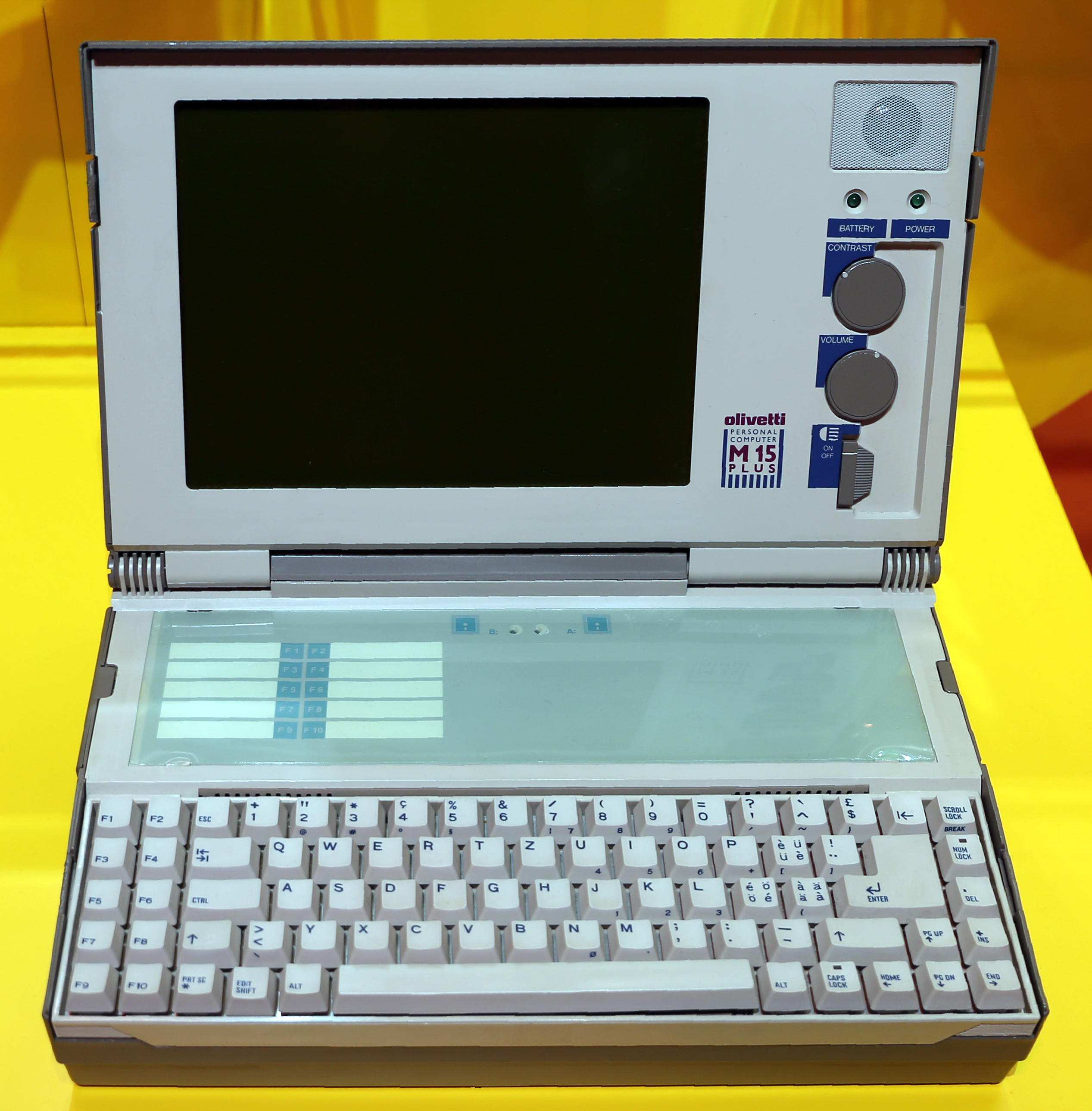
Olivetti M15

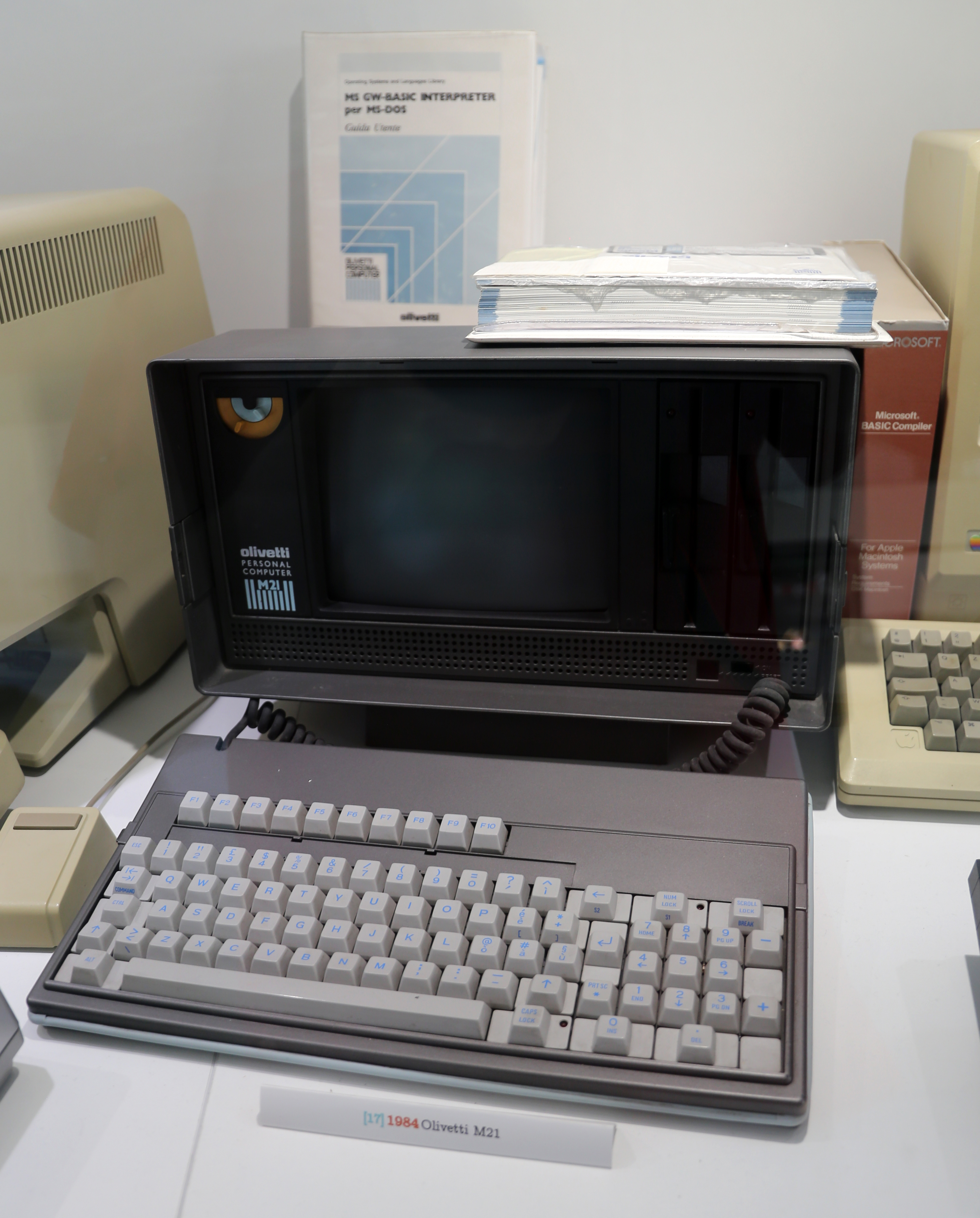
Olivetti M21

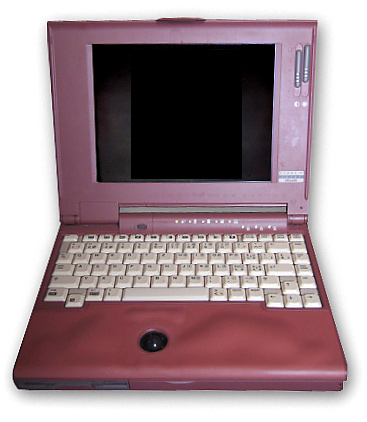
Olivetti Echos

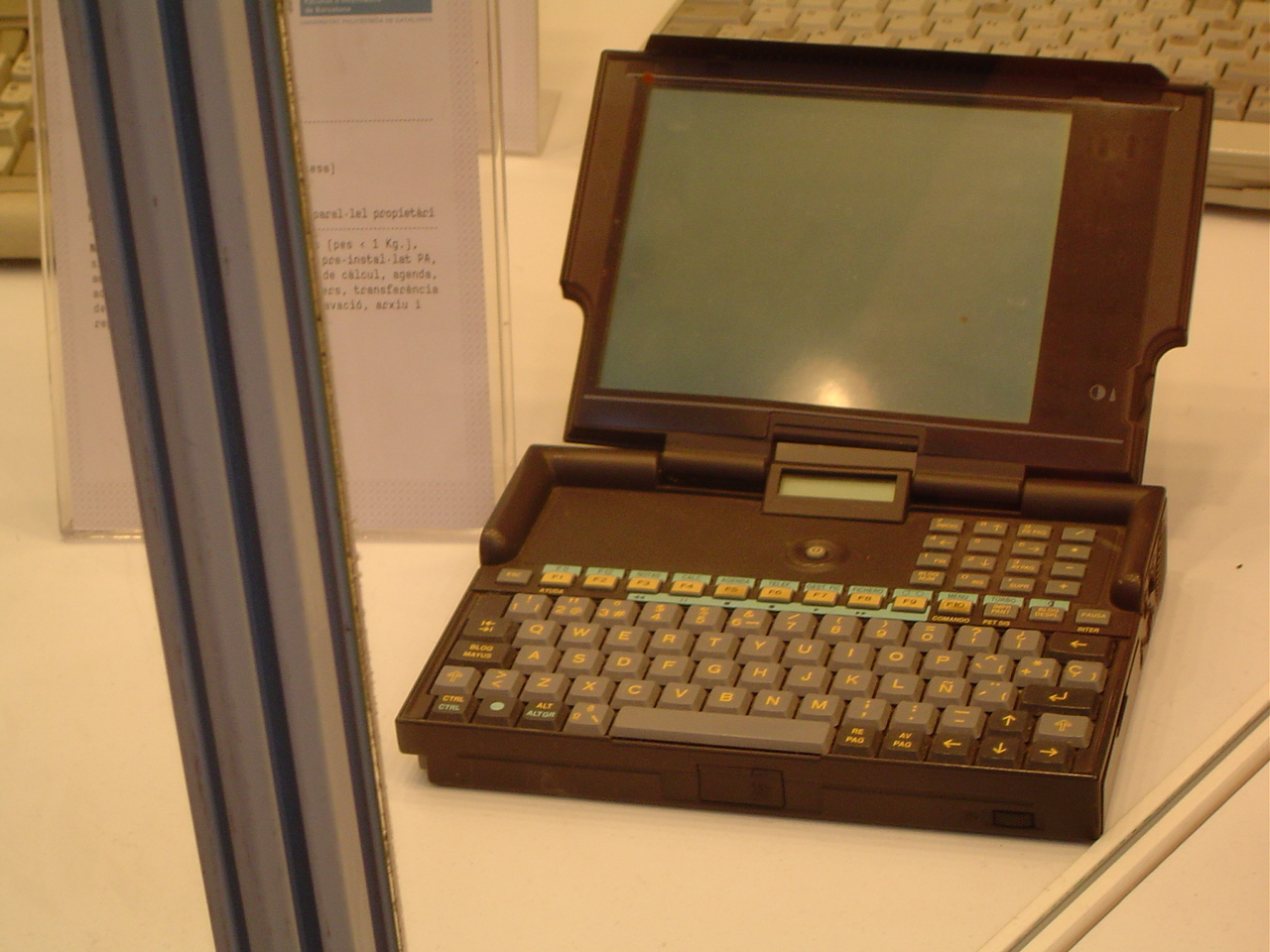
Olivetti Quaderno

== End of Olivetti as a separate company ==
In the 1990s, Olivetti's computer businesses were in great difficulty, reportedly because of the competition from US vendors and new cheap manufacturers for PC components in Taiwan like ASUS, MSI, Gigabyte and others from which local system builders profited much to offer cheaper PCs than Olivetti did with their own designs. It was on the brink of collapse and had needed government support to stay afloat.

In 1992, Digital Equipment Corporation announced its intention to invest in Olivetti, approximating to a 10% stake valued at around $300 million, amidst a wave of investment in European companies by their US counterparts. Digital were already reselling Olivetti personal computer models in Europe, and the investment presented an opportunity for the adoption of Digital's Alpha processor in Olivetti's workstation products. The investment was to be done in two steps over 18 months, augmented by additional share purchases. The partnership between the companies, regarded as a way of supporting Olivetti whilst cementing a development relationship around Digital's Alpha platform, developed in the following two years, although the balance of revenue from selling products to each other was reported as being strongly in Olivetti's favour, it having generated 125.3 billion lire from Digital in 1993, but with Digital only selling products worth 9.9 billion lire to Olivetti. Digital remained a significant buyer of laser printers and laptops from Olivetti, but had begun to manufacture its own personal computers and planned to produce its own laptops. Meanwhile, Olivetti had been slow to introduce Alpha-based products, eventually shipping models based on Digital's own products. With Digital's finances under pressure, posting quarterly losses and incurring costs around redundancies, the company sold its stake – noted as amounting to 7.8% – for $150 million.

It ended its typewriter business in favor of personal computers, but in 1997 spun off its personal computer business and in 1998 divested its computer services business. During that period, it turned to telecommunications. In the process, it had lost around 75% of its staff.

In 1999, The Luxembourg-based company Bell S.A. acquired a controlling stake in Olivetti, but two years later sold it to a consortium including the Pirelli and Benetton groups. In February 1999, Olivetti launched a hostile bid for the seven-times-larger monopoly Telecom Italia, Italy's #1 fixed-line and mobile phone operator. Another bidder, namely Deutsche Telekom, reportedly won the take-over battle, with an $82 billion merger agreed in April 1999. But in the end Olivetti won, buying 52.12% control of Telecom Italia. However, the ownership structure of the merged company was complex and multi-layered, adding $16 billion debt. It was referred to as the "Olivetti/Telecom Italia affair" because of the secret affairs.

After a 2003 reorganization, Olivetti became the office equipment and systems services subsidiary of Telecom Italia. Thus it was absorbed into the Telecom Italia Group, but maintained a separate identity as Olivetti Tecnost.

== Rebirth and resumption of computer production ==
In 2005, Telecom Italia relaunched the company in the information technology sector, investing €200 million, at first restoring the original Olivetti brand, then replacing it with Olivetti Tecnost in 2003. In 2007, Olivetti launched the "LINEA_OFFICE", designed by Jasper Morrison for Olivetti; a new line of PCs, notebooks, printers, fax machines and calculators. Olivetti today operates in Italy and Switzerland, and has sales associates in 83 countries. Research and development were based in Agliè, Carsoli and Scarmagno in Italy, and Yverdon, Switzerland.

In March 2011 Olivetti began producing the OliPad, its first tablet computer, featuring a ten-inch screen, 3G, WiFi, Bluetooth connectivity, Nvidia Tegra 2, Android 2.2.2 and a 1024 x 600 display. It also features an application store, with apps specifically designed by Olivetti for 'business & government'. In 2014 the R&D department in Arnad was sold to SICPA.

== Smartphones ==
In 2013, Olivetti launched a series of smartphones called Oliphone:

- Olivetti Oliphone M8140
- Olivetti Oliphone Q8145
- Olivetti Oliphone Q8150
- Olivetti Oliphone Q9047
- Olivetti Oliphone WG451
- Olivetti Oliphone WG501

== See also ==
- List of Italian companies
- Società Generale Semiconduttori
