= Divisumma 18 =

Olivetti electronic printing calculator

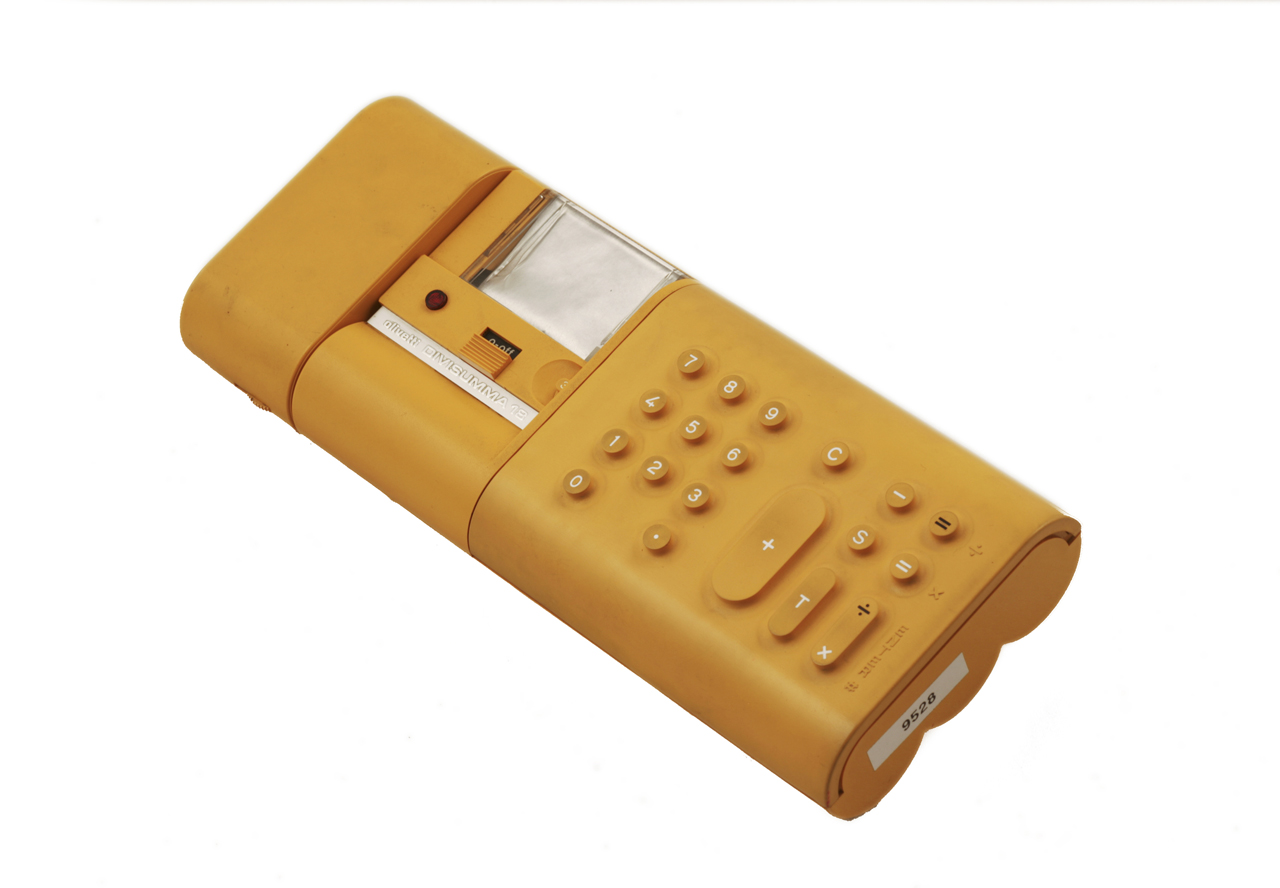
Olivetti Divisumma 18, Museo Nazionale della Scienza e della Tecnologia "Leonardo da Vinci", Milan

The Divisumma 18 was an electronic printing business calculator manufactured by Olivetti in 1972 and designed by Milanese architect Mario Bellini. It was selected for its collection by the Museum of Modern Art in New York.

The skin of the Divisumma 18 is a distinctive shade of yellow, made from a combination injection-molded plastic and synthetic rubber.
