= Camillo Olivetti =

Italian engineer (1868–1943)

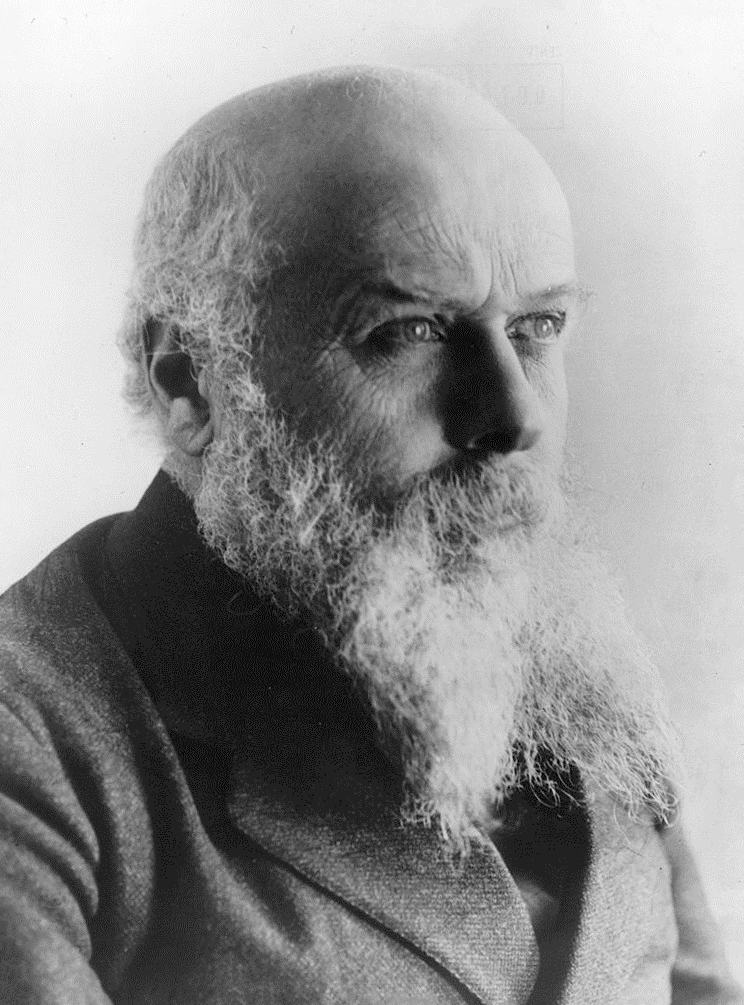
- Born: Samuel David Camillo Olivetti; 13 August 1868; Ivrea, Piedmont, Italy
- Died: December 1943 (aged 75); Biella, Piedmont, Italy
- Occupations: Engineer, company founder
- Children: Adriano

Samuel David Camillo Olivetti (13 August 1868 – December 1943) was an Italian electrical engineer and founder of Olivetti & Co., SpA., the Italian manufacturer of computers, printers and other business machines. The company was later run by his son Adriano.

== Biography ==
Samuel David Camillo Olivetti was born in 1868 in a bourgeois Jewish family in Ivrea, Piedmont. His father, Salvador Benedetto, was a textile trader and his mother, Elvira Sacerdoti, who was from Modena, was a banker's daughter. From his father, Camillo Olivetti received the entrepreneurial style and a love for progress, while from his mother a love for languages (Elvira spoke four languages). His cousin was the painter Raffaele Pontremoli. When Camillo was twelve months old, his father died. His mother looked after him, and he was sent to the "Calchi Taeggi" boarding school in Milan. After secondary school he enrolled at the Royal Italian Industrial Museum (later Politecnico di Torino from 1906) and at the Technical Application School, where he attended electrotechnics courses led by Galileo Ferraris. Having graduated on 31 December 1891 in industrial engineering, Olivetti needed to improve his English and gain useful work experience. He stayed over a year in London where he worked for a company that produced measuring instruments for electrical quantities, while also being a mechanic. Upon his return to Turin, he became Ferraris's assistant. In 1893 he accompanied his teacher to the United States of America, who had been invited to lecture at the International Congress of Electrotechnics in Chicago. Olivetti acted as his interpreter. Together they visited the Thomas A. Edison laboratories at Llewellyn Park, New Jersey, where they met the brilliant American inventor in person. After this meeting, in 1893, Camillo wrote to his brother-in-law Carlo from Chicago:

13 August 1893. […] Now that I've given you some impressions of the city, I'll tell you how I spent my time there. […] Mr. Hammer took us to Llewellin Park, a half hour train ride from New York to see Edison's laboratory. Mr. Edison himself came to receive us and had a little conversation with us and played some pieces of music on his phonograph. As you can see, I soon started making the acquaintance of famous people. Edison has a huge building there in Llewellin Park which, like most of the industrial and private buildings here, is made of wood. Beyond a beautiful library and a warehouse where he keeps a bit of everything, he has a huge laboratory with about seventy horsepower, machines, electric dynamos, lathes, machine tools, a complete physics and chemistry cabinet, a photographic cabinet and even a theater where he is making experiences, which seem to have not been very successful up to now, on the cinema. He is helped by a large number of assistants and whatever he can think of to build he can do it without difficulty. Edison is a handsome man, tall with a Napoleonic face. He is kind but being rather deaf, and on the other hand not being the prof. Ferraris capable for the moment neither of understanding nor of explaining himself much in English, the conversation was not very animated. […]

— Camillo Olivetti, American Letters, Adriano Olivetti Foundation, 1968-1999

Camillo continued the journey from Chicago to San Francisco alone, carefully writing down the things he was discovering about the United States of America. His correspondence from the United States was published in 1968 with the title of American Letters : if the British industrial situation had already struck him, he found the American reality far superior, not only from an industrial point of view but also from a social point of view. After a few months in Palo Alto he began to know US universities better. As an assistant electrotechnical engineer at Stanford University (November 1893 - April 1894), Olivetti was able to experiment in the laboratory the different potential applications of the use of electricity. From that point the United States always represented for Olivetti the frontier of economic modernity, the model to refer to in Italy's own industrial progress: the vivid memory of the collection of American letters, published after his death in Biella in December 1943.

After returning to Italy in 1894, Olivetti began importing typewriters while continuing his work as an electrical engineer. In 1896 he established a workshop in Ivrea producing electrical measuring instruments, one of the first Italian companies specializing in precision electrical equipment. The enterprise provided both technical experience and financial resources that later enabled him to enter the typewriter industry. In 1908 Olivetti founded ''Ing. C. Olivetti & C.'' in Ivrea with the aim of manufacturing typewriters domestically. At the time, nearly all typewriters used in Italy were imported. Following almost two years of development, the company introduced the M1 in 1911, regarded as the first typewriter designed and manufactured in Italy.

During the 1910s and 1920s, Olivetti expanded from a small workshop into one of Italy's leading manufacturers of office equipment. The M20 typewriter, introduced in 1920, proved commercially successful and enabled the company to expand into international markets. By the 1930s the company had diversified into teleprinters, calculating machines and office furniture.

Olivetti believed that technological innovation should be accompanied by improvements in workers' education and welfare. His admiration for American industrial organization, formed during his travels in the United States, influenced both the technical development of his company and its managerial practices. Many of these ideas were later developed further by his son Adriano Olivetti, whose social and industrial policies gained international recognition.

== See also ==
- Adriano Olivetti
