= Till roll =

Till rolls (sometimes called audit slip, cash register record, detail-strip or journal paper) refers to paper rolls used in cash registers and point of sale printers to track the flow of transactions. Till roll may refer to either the roll of paper on which a receipt is printed, or the purchase record for a cash register.

== Purpose ==
Tills rolls existed to simplify bookkeeping while using a cash register. The roll automatically records all transactions in varying levels of complexity and stores it within the register, out of reach of a cashier. Audit slips have largely been replaced by highly computerized cash registers and point of sale systems, which allow managers and bookkeepers to pull highly detailed records about transactions.

== Varieties of till rolls ==
=== Plain paper ===
Some early machines did not provide customer copies. Registers printed transactions onto a continuous paper strip using an ink ribbon, similar to a typewriter.

=== Thermal paper ===
See thermal paper

=== Carbon/Carbonless paper ===
See carbon copy and carbonless copy paper

These rolls require an impact printer and produce multiple copies. Carbon copies (or carbonless copies) were stored by the business and used for bookkeeping. A copy was given to the customer, the other copy was automatically separated and stored in the machine.

== See also ==
- Cash register
- Receipt
- Point of sale
- Skimming (fraud)
