= Olivetti computers =

Italian electronics manufacturer

The Olivetti company, an Italian manufacturer of computers, tablets, smartphones, printers and other such business products as calculators and fax machines, was founded as a typewriter manufacturer by Camillo Olivetti in 1908 in the Turin commune of Ivrea, Italy. Olivetti was a pioneer in computer development, starting with the mainframe systems in the 1950s, and continuing into the 1990s with PC-compatible laptops and desktops.

== History ==
=== 1950–1960s ===
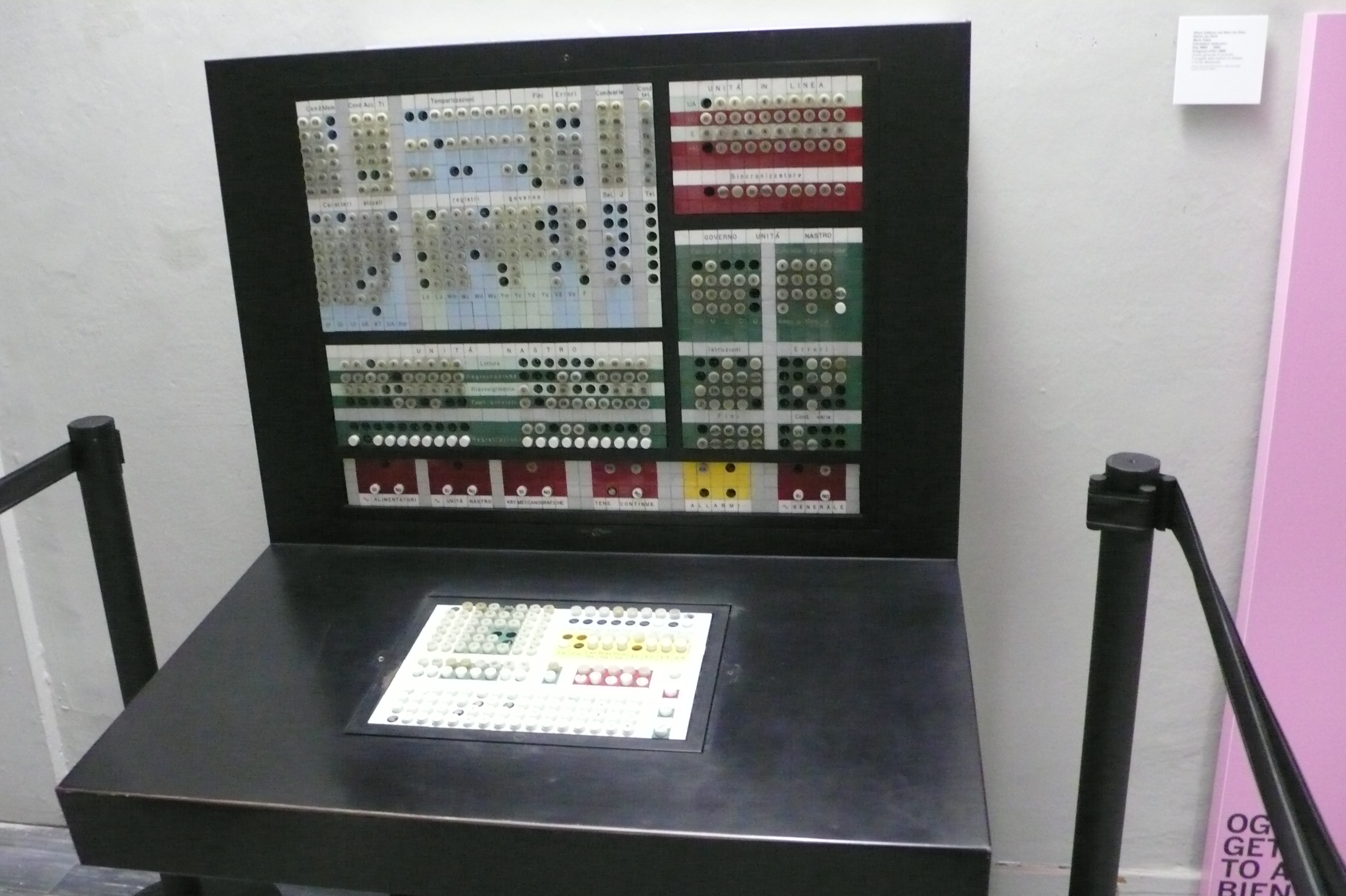
Central control unit of the mainframe Olivetti Elea 9003 (1957)

Between 1955 and 1964 Olivetti developed some of the first transistorized mainframe computer systems, such as the Elea 9003. Although 40 large commercial 9003 and over 100 smaller 6001 scientific machines were completed and leased to customers to 1964, low sales, loss of two key managers and financial instability caused Olivetti to withdraw from the field in 1964.

In 1965, Olivetti released the Programma 101, considered one of the first commercial desktop programmable calculators. It was saved from the sale of the computer division to GE thanks to an employee, Gastone Garziera, who spent successive nights changing the internal categorization of the product from "computer" to "calculator", so leaving the small team in Olivetti and creating some awkward situations in the office, since that space was now owned by GE.

=== 1970s ===
In 1974, the firm released the TC800, an intelligent terminal designed to be attached to a mainframe and used in the finance sector. It was followed in 1977 by the TC1800.

==== P6040 ====
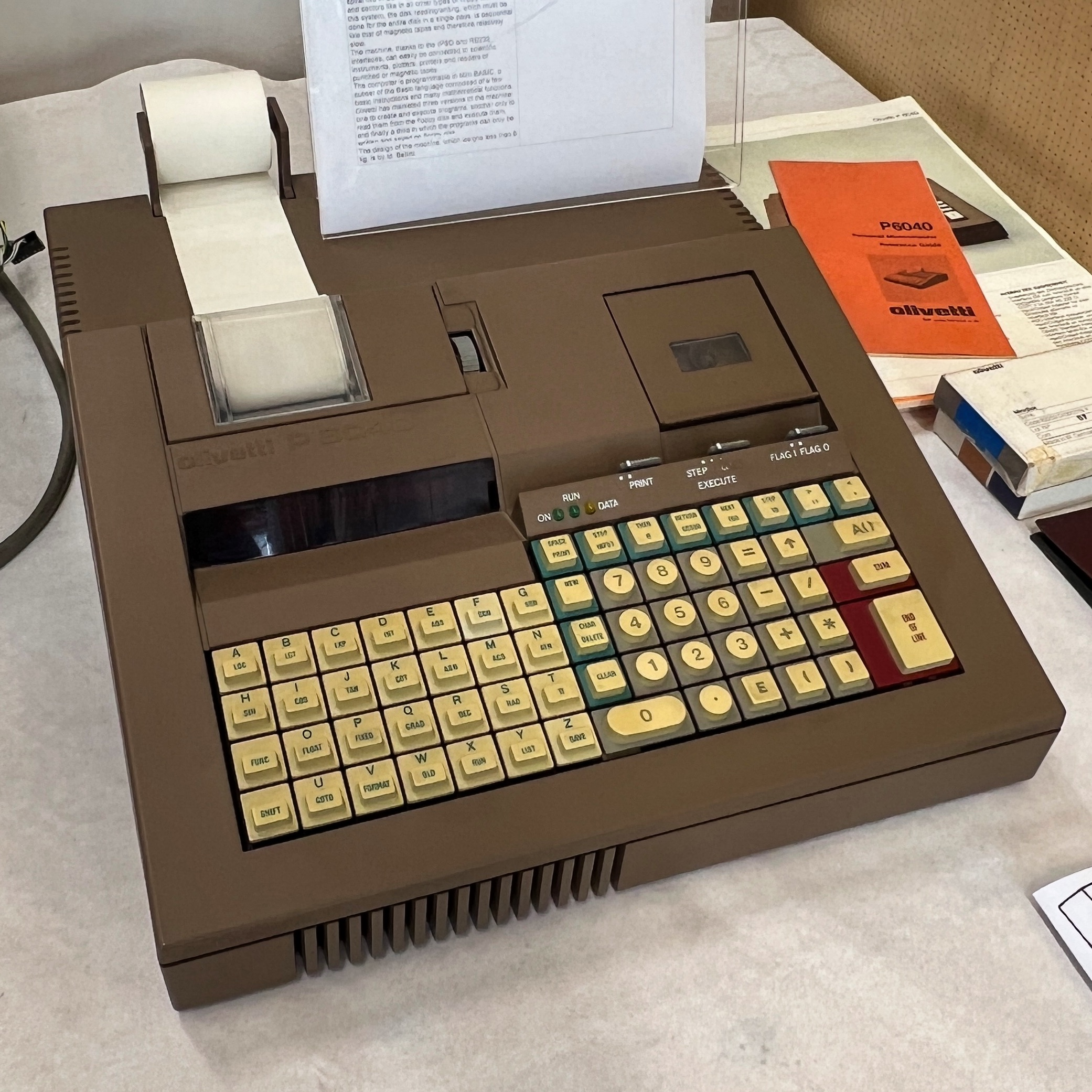
Olivetti P6040 based on an Intel 8080 CPU (1977)

The Olivetti P6040 was a personal computer, described by its maker as a personal minicomputer. The P6040 was programmable in Mini BASIC and featured a floppy disk drive that used proprietary 2.5-inch sleeveless disks called "Minidisk". It was produced starting from 1977 and was the first microprocessor-based Olivetti computer, the Intel 8080, instead of on TTL logic CPU.

Designed by Pier Giorgio Perotto, it was presented at Hannover Messe in April 1975 together with the P6060, its hardware used TTL technology. Both had a brown-colored case.

The P6040 was little in dimensions and weight, thanks to the introduction of microprocessor (for the first time at Olivetti).

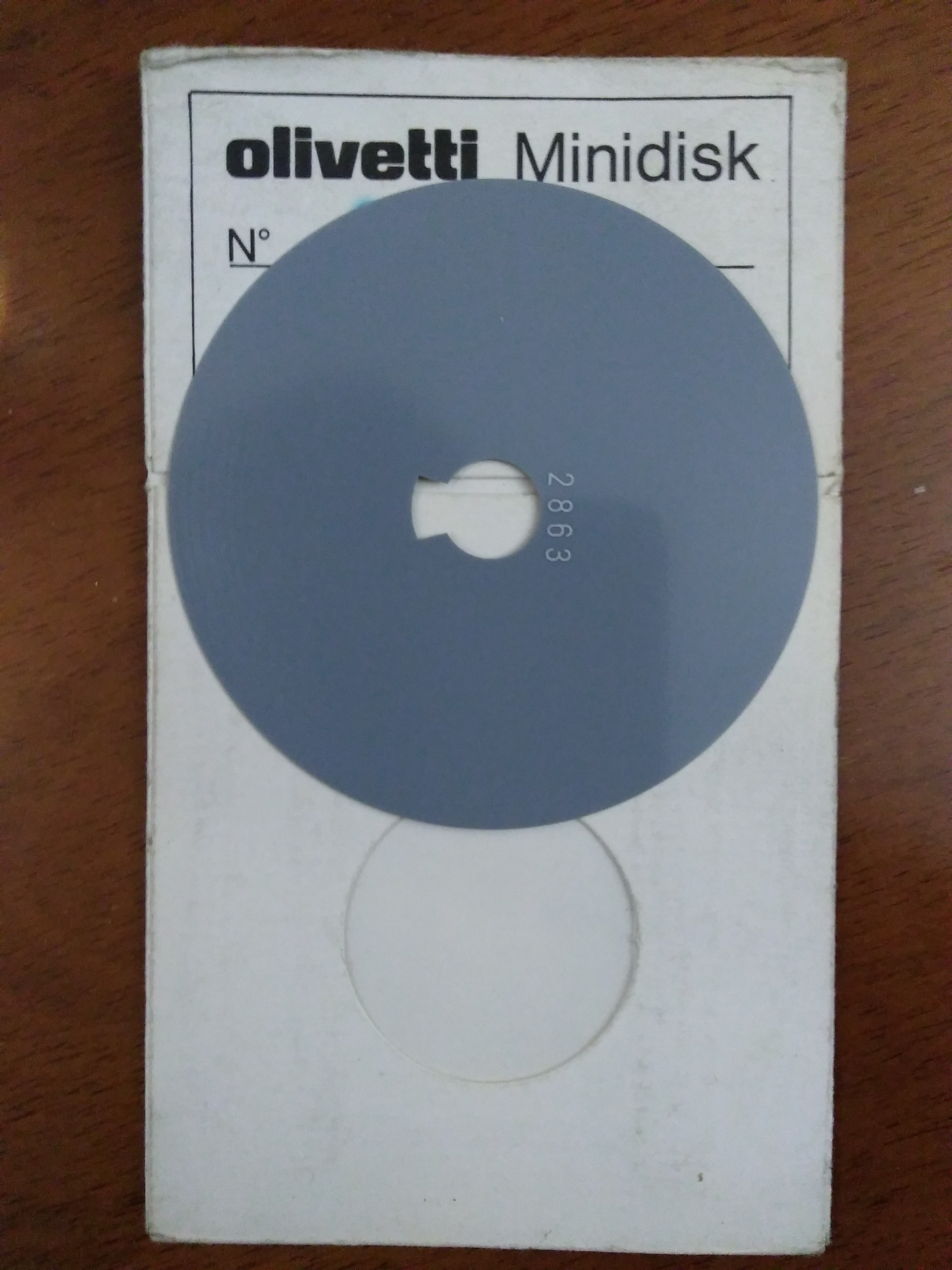
Olivetti Minidisk used for P6040 systems

Another innovation in the model was the introduction of the light-emitting diode display. The design was by Mario Bellini.

=== 1980s ===
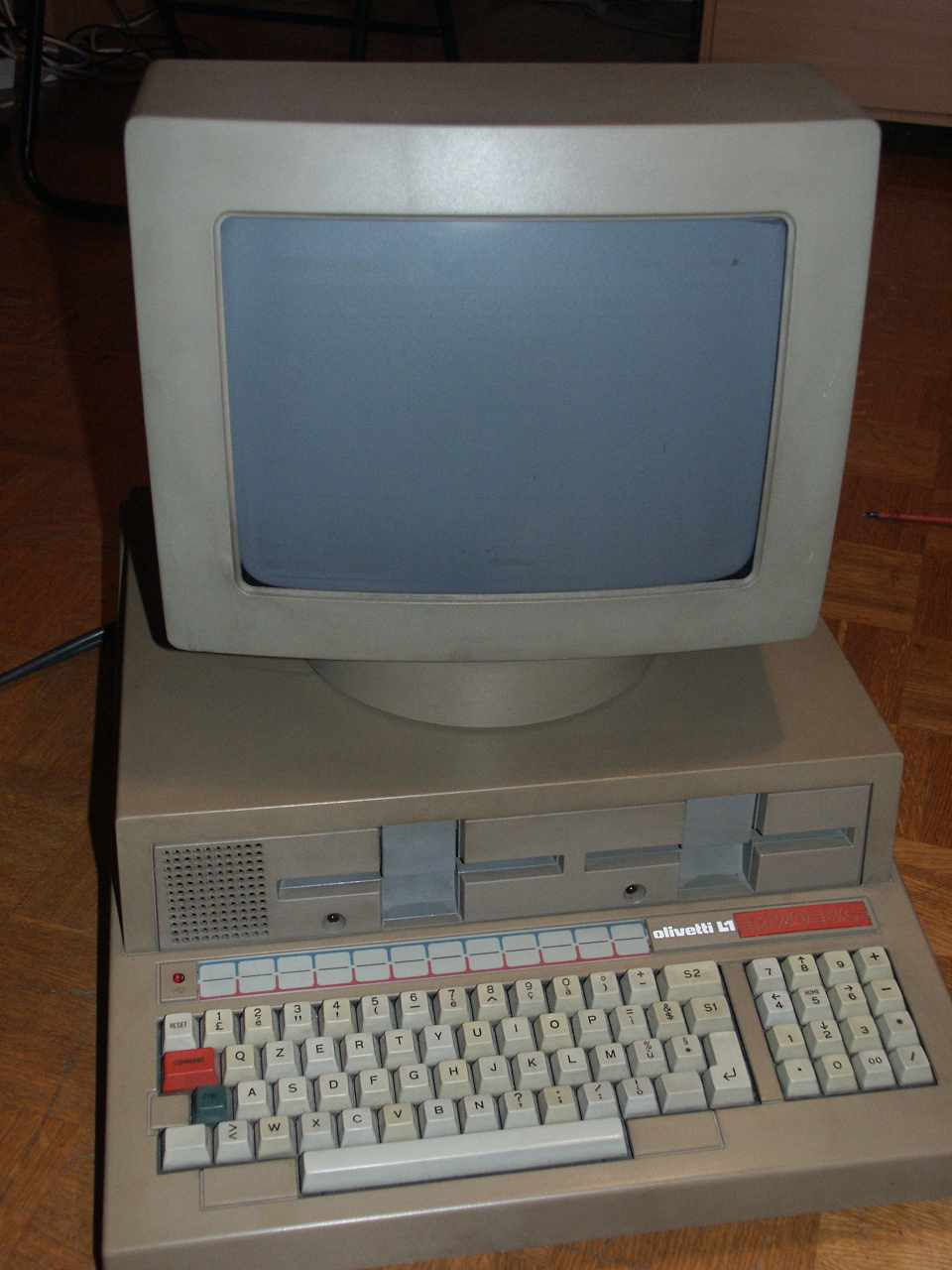
Olivetti M20

Olivetti's first modern personal computer, the M20, featuring a Zilog Z8000 CPU, was released in 1982.

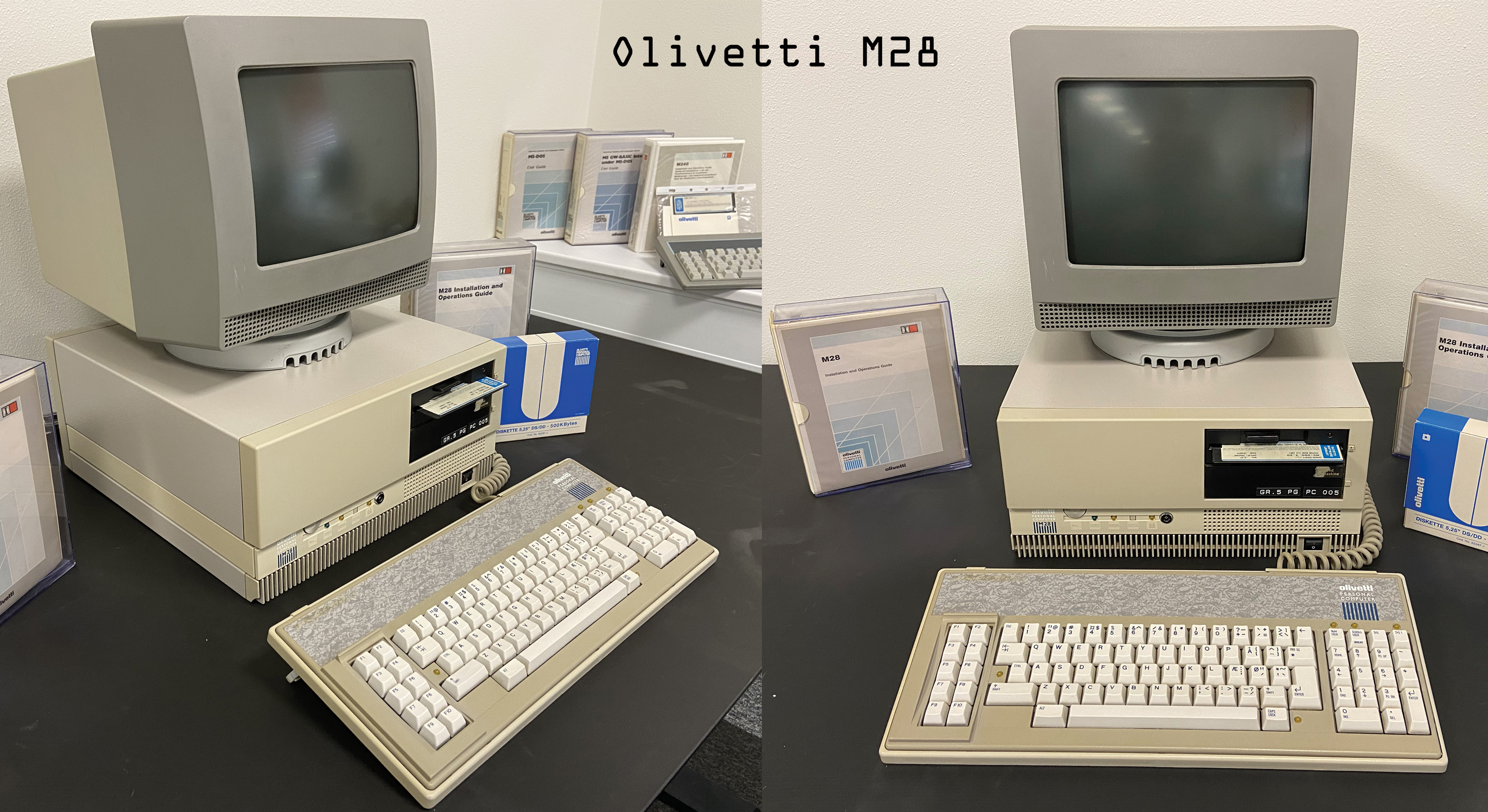
Olivetti M28

The M20 was followed in 1983 by the M24, a clone of the IBM PC using DOS and the Intel 8086 processor (at 8 MHz) instead of the Intel 8088 used by IBM (at 4.77 MHz). The M24 was sold in North America as the AT&T 6300. Olivetti also manufactured the AT&T 6300 Plus, which could run both DOS and Unix. The M24 was also sold as Xerox 6060 in the US, and as LogAbax PERSONA 1600 in France. The Olivetti M28 was the firm's first PC to have the Intel 80286 processor. It was sold in France as the LogAbax Persona 1800.

The same year Olivetti produced its M10 laptop computer, a 8085-based workalike of the successful Radio Shack TRS-80 Model 100, which it marketed in Europe. These were the first laptops to sell in million-unit quantities, though the Olivetti M10 itself only attained sales figures in the tens of thousands and went out of production within two years.

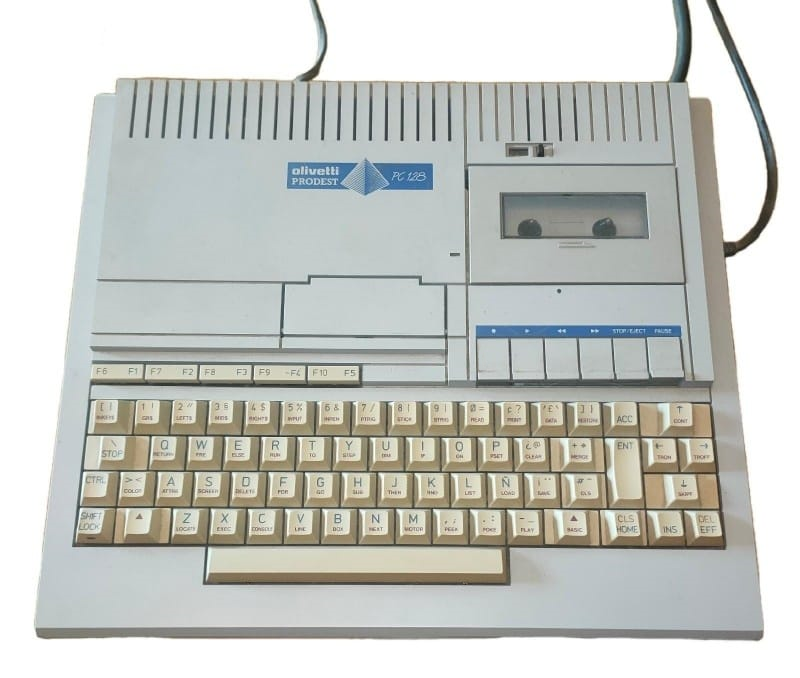
Olivetti Prodest PC128

In 1985, the company acquired a controlling share in the British computer manufacturer Acorn Computers Ltd; a third partner was Thomson SA. Olivetti sold the Thomson MO6 and Acorn BBC Master Compact with brand names Olivetti Prodest PC128 and PC128S respectively.

In 1987, Olivetti introduced the LSX line of computers which was based on the Motorola 68000 series of processors. They could run either Olivetti's proprietary MOS or Olivetti's own Unix variant, X/OS. Intended to replace Olivetti's existing Linea Uno (L1) range of multiuser systems, introduced in 1981, the reported $250 million investment in the LSX line by Olivetti was seen as a necessary measure to update its range, bringing increased performance, offering an upgrade path to existing customers (with a promise that existing L1 systems could be upgraded with a new processor card), and preserving a degree of control over product designs that would not have been possible by merely selling or adapting products from AT&T, at that time a significant shareholder in the company. For the high-end LSX models, Olivetti employed technologies from Edge Computer, an Arizona-based company pursuing higher-performance processor designs offering a degree of compatibility with the Motorola 68000 architecture.

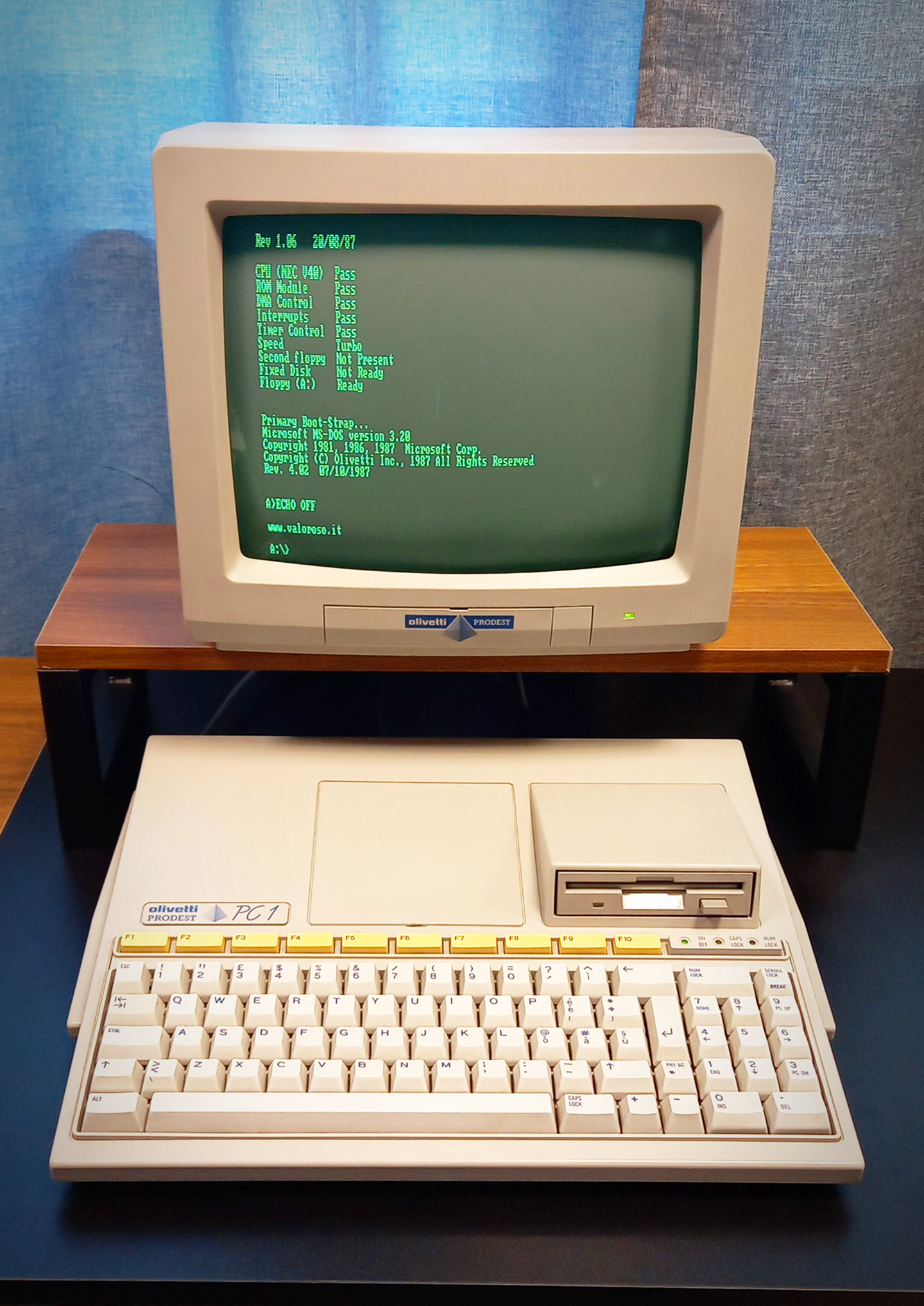
Olivetti Prodest PC1

In 1988, Olivetti released the M380/C, part of the Pandora project – an experimental system for multimedia applications. They also released the PC1 Prodest and PC1 HD (XT clones, similar to the Schneider Euro PC).

In 1989, the Olivetti M290S was released, featuring an Intel 80286 at 12 MHz, 1 MB of RAM and a 30 MB hard drive. That same year, the company presented their 80486-based next generation of workstations, with Olivetti's CP486 (Computing Platform 486) model (with EISA bus) being shown at CeBit. As part of a relaunch of the company's Open Systems Architecture (OSA) strategy in 1991, the CP486 was renamed to the LSX-5010, and an accompanying 33 MHz model was introduced as the LSX-5020, alongside the four-processor LSX-5030 and LSX-5040 systems. The CP486 provided sockets for a Weitek WTL4167 numeric co-processor and an Intel i860 RISC processor.

=== 1990s ===
In 1990, Olivetti had its own distribution network in New Zealand through Essentially Software Ltd. (owned by Gary McNabb) located at Mt. Eden in Auckland and Wellington, where Olivetti M300-100 16 MHz PCs with 80386SX CPU were sold for NZ$7395 and used as graphical work station for design houses using Corel Draw as graphical program. The New Zealand distribution stopped in 1991 when Olivetti could not supply their PCs.

In 1991, Olivetti introduced the D33, a laptop in a carry case and the PCS 286S, a PC with VGA monitor and keyboard. Olivetti also sold quasi-portable 8086/8088-based PCs with an integrated keyboard and one or two integrated 3.5" floppy disk drives, running DOS 3.27, an Olivetti OEM version of PC DOS 3.20 with minor improvements like the M21 portable (based on M24) and the M15. Also later Olivetti produced interesting laptops like M111, M211, S20, D33, Philos and Echos series. A very interesting subnotebook was the Quaderno, about the same size as an A5 paper – it was the grandfather of the netbooks introduced 20 years later.

Although Olivetti had committed to a range of MIPS-based workstations running Windows NT, introducing the M700 series in 1992 with the M700-10 featuring a MIPS R4000PC processor, the company pursued a partnership with Digital Equipment Corporation in 1992, putting its MIPS-based offerings in doubt as the company announced its intention to eventually focus on only two product lines: one featuring Intel processors and the other Alpha processors. This partnership eventually led to the introduction of the LSX 7000 range of workstations and servers employing Digital's Alpha CPU in 1994. However, just as Olivetti had abandoned its development of products based on the MIPS architecture, discontinuing the M700 produced by its Japanese subsidiary, by 1993, the company had also narrowed its development focus "entirely" to systems based on Intel's Pentium, merely reselling "semi-finished" Digital products based on Alpha.

Olivetti did attempt to recover its position by introducing the Envision in 1995, a full multimedia PC, to be used in the living room; this project was a failure. Gateway also introduced a similar product in the U.S., called the Destination 2000, around the same period, to a similarly mixed commercial reception.

The company continued to develop personal computers until it sold its PC business in 1997.

== Models ==
Name	Photo	Year	Type	CPU	Created by	Design by	Notes
Elea		1957	Mainframe	Transistor based	Mario Tchou	Ettore Sottsass	Elea series (1957–64). Entirely Transistor based. The Elea 9003 (photo) is the first commercial model
P101 (Programma 101)		1964	Programmable calculator	Transistor based	Pier Giorgio Perotto	Mario Bellini (chassis)	In New York's MoMA . Golden Compass Award.
P102		1965	Programmable calculator	Transistor based	Pier Giorgio Perotto	Mario Bellini	Version of Programma 101 with an RS-232 serial connector and ability to connect printer
P203		1967	Personal computer	Transistor based	Pier Giorgio Perotto	Mario Bellini	P101 with Tekne 3 and Editor 4. For business, printer included
P602		1971	Microcomputer	Integrated circuit			For technical or scientific usage
P603		1972	Microcomputer	Integrated circuit			P602 with Editor 4. For business.
P652		1973	Microcomputer			Mario Bellini	For technical or scientific usage
TC800		1974	Mainframe				Banking terminal
TC1800		1978	Mainframe				
P6060		1975	Personal computer	PUCE1/PUCE2; TTL	Pier Giorgio Perotto	Ettore Sottsass and G. Sowden	For technical or scientific usage
P6040		1975	Personal computer	Intel 8080	Pier Giorgio Perotto	Mario Bellini	First Olivetti computer to use a microprocessor. For technical or scientific usage. Three versions.
P6066		1975	Personal computer	Similar to P6060	Pier Giorgio Perotto		
Olivetti BCS		1974–78	Mainframe	Business Computer Systems, from 1974–1978			
M20		1982	Personal computer	Zilog Z8001 4 MHz	Enrico Pesatori, Enzo Torresi and project team	Ettore Sottsass Antonio Macchi Cassia George Sowden	First Olivetti personal computer in 1982. Own operating system: PCOS. Commercial Failure
M10		1983	Laptop	Intel 80C85 CMOS at 3 MHz		Antonio Macchi Cassia Perry A. King	First laptop. Present under different brand names: Kiotronic Kc-85, Tandy Trs-80, NEC PC-8201 and Olivetti M10. SMAU Industrial Design prize
M30		1983	Minicomputer	Zilog Z8001		George Sowden	Linea L1. Operating system COSMOS IV (MOS)
M40		1983	Minicomputer	Zilog Z8001		George Sowden	Linea L1. Operating system COSMOS IV (MOS)
M44		1983	Minicomputer	Zilog Z8001		George Sowden	Linea L1
M60		1984	Minicomputer	Zilog Z8001		George Sowden	Linea L1. Operating system COSMOS IV (MOS)
M24		1983	Personal computer desktop	Intel 8086 (16 bit) at 8 MHz – Optional coprocessor 8087	Luigi Mercurio, Sandro Graciotti	E. Sottsass	IBM PC compatible; First Olivetti MS-DOS compatible computer
M21		1983	Laptop	Intel 8086 (16 bit) at 4 MHz – Optional coprocessor 8087			Portable version of the M24 with an integrated monitor.
M19		1986	Personal computer	AMD 8088 4.77MHz			Economical model
M28		1986	Personal computer	Intel 80286 8MHz			
M70		1986	Minicomputer	Zilog Z8001			Linea L1. Operating system COSMOS IV (MOS)
Prodest PC 128		1986	Home Computer	Motorola 6809e 1 MHz			Rebranded Thomson MO6, first on the Olivetti Prodest series.
M15		1987	Laptop	Intel 80C88 4.77MHz			Removable keyboard. First laptop.
Prodest PC 128s		1987	Home Computer	MOS 6512 2 MHz			Sold as the BBC Master Compact outside of Italy, second in the Olivetti Prodest series.
Prodest PC1		1988	Home Computer	NEC V40 4.778 MHz, XT clone			Third in the Olivetti Prodest series.
M200		1988	Personal computer	NEC V40 8 MHz			Parallel project to the ETV 2700 typewriter
M240		1984	Personal computer	Intel 8086 8 MHz			
M280		1986	Personal computer	Intel 80286 12 MHz			
M290		1984	Personal computer	Intel 80286 12 MHz			
M380-40		1991					
M380/C		1988					proprietary "Pandora" OS
M380		1988	Personal Computer	Intel 80186			Model 380/C
M380		1988	Personal Computer	Intel 80386DX 20 MHz			Model XP1 and XP5
M380		1989	Personal Computer	Intel 80386DX 25 MHz			Model XP7 (tower)
M380		1990	Personal Computer	Intel 80386SX 33 MHz			Model XP9 (tower) Operating system SCO Xenix
PE28		1988					
M111		1989	Laptop	NEC V30 10 MHz		Mario Bellini Bruce Fifield	Operating system DOS 3.30
M260s		1989	Personal computer	Intel 80286 12 MHz (16 bit)			Parallel project to the ETV 4000s typewriter
M290S		1989					
P500		1989					
M386-25		1990					
PCS 386SX		1991					
PCS 86		1990	Personal computer	NEC V30 10 MHz			
PCS 286		1991	Personal computer	Intel 80286 12.5 MHz			
M211		1989	Laptop	Intel 80286			Operating system Windows 3.0
M250		1989	Personal computer	Intel 80286 8 MHz			The 250-E model was clocked at 12 MHz
CP486		1989	Personal computer	Intel 80486DX 25 MHz			Tower, EISA, "Computing Platform"
P800		1990	Personal computer	Intel 80486DX 25 MHz			Tower. Olivetti MS-DOS 5.00, MS Windows 3.1
LSX		1987	Personal computer	Motorola 68k			
LSX 3005		1987	Personal computer	Motorola 68k			
LSX 3010		1987	Personal computer	Motorola 68k			
LSX 3015			Personal computer	Motorola 68k			
LSX 3018/BS			Personal computer				
LSX 3020		1987	Personal computer	Motorola 68k			
LSX 520		1989	Personal computer				
LSX-5010		1991	Personal computer				
LSX-5015		1991	Personal computer				
LSX-5020			Personal computer				
LSX-5030			Personal computer				
PC PRO 486/33		1991					
PC PRO 290SP							
M400-40		1992					
M6-460 Suprema		1994					
M290-30		1988					
M480		1990	Personal computer	Intel 80486SX 20 MHz			Model M480-10 (EISA)
M480			Personal computer	Intel 80486SX 33 MHz			M480-20 (EISA)
M480			Personal computer	Intel 80486DX 33 MHz			M480-40/60 (EISA)
M316		1991	Laptop	Intel 80386SX 16 MHz			
M300		1988	Personal computer	Intel 80386SX 20 MHz			Model M300-02
M300			Personal computer				Model M300-30
M300			Personal computer				Model M300-04
M300			Personal computer	Intel 80386SX 20 MHz			Model M300-10
M300			Personal computer	Intel 80486 25/50 MHz			Model M300-28
LSX-5030		1992	Personal computer	Intel 80486DX 33 MHz			Tower, EISA
S20		1991	Laptop	Intel 80386SX 16 MHz			Triumph-Adler Walkstadtion 386SX
D33		1991	Laptop	Intel 80386 33 MHz			Triumph-Adler Walkstadtion 386
Quaderno		1992	Netbook	NEC V30HL 16MHz		Mario Bellini	precursor to the netbooks 1992, 25th SMAU Industrial Design Prize (Italia) 1993, IF Auszeichnung fur gutes Design
Philos		1993	Laptop			Michele De Lucchi and Hagai Shvadron	Models: 11, 22, 33, and 44.
Echos		1995	Laptop	Intel Pentium I 75MHz Socket 5		Michele De Lucchi	P75 and P100d
Envision		1995	Multimedia	Intel Pentium I 75MHz Socket 5		Michele De Lucchi	Model P75. Innovative product but a commercial failure. Proprietary multimedia OS
Modulo M4		1992	Personal computer	Intel 80486 SX 25 MHz			M4-M40
Modulo M4		1992	Personal computer	Pentium 75 MHz			M4-M464
Modulo M4		1995	Personal computer				M4-P75
Modulo M4		1996	Personal computer	Intel Pentium-S 75 MHz			M4-P75S
Modulo M4		1996	Personal computer	Intel Pentium 100 MHz			M4-P100
Modulo M4		1996	Personal computer	Intel Pentium 133 MHz			M4-P133
M8500		1999	Personal computer	Intel Pentium III 500 MHz			DT desktop, MT minitower

== Peripherals ==
- PR40, PR2, PR2-e, PR2+, PR2-10 Scanner Printer which was used in banking sectors
- PG-series and PGL-series – black and white digital printers
- d-Color p-series color digital printers
- A3 and A4 series MFP

== See also ==
- Macchine per scrivere della Olivetti (it): the list of every model of Olivetti typewriter and related article on the Italian Wikipedia
- Olivetti typewriters
