= Pier Giorgio Perotto =

Italian electrical engineer and inventor

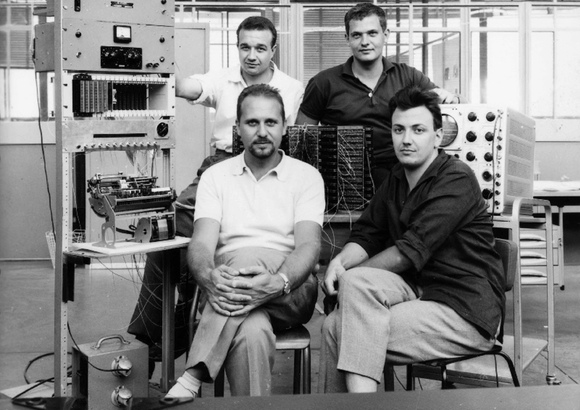
P. G. Perotto (seated to the left) with the P101 team

Pier Giorgio Perotto (Turin, December 24, 1930 – Genoa, January 23, 2002) was an Italian electrical engineer and inventor. Working for the manufacturer Olivetti, he led a design team that built the Programma 101, one of the world's first programmable calculators.

== Career ==
Graduated at the Turin Polytechnic, Perotto taught for many years at the same University and published several books and articles regarding strategy, business organization and technology.

He began his career at Fiat and later on moved to the machine company Olivetti. Working as General Director of projects and research at the Ivrea’s company, he played a major role in the transformation of this multinational company from a mechanical to electronics and systems company.

In the 1970s, he designed other computers at Olivetti, e.g. the Olivetti P6060, the first personal computer with integrated floppy-disk drive, the Olivetti P6040 and the Olivetti P6066.

Together with Sergio Raimondi, Perotto launched FINSA Consulting in 1997, becoming the president since its foundation. After this moment he turned himself into a committed teacher and a prolific writer, writing with many essays (in Italian) about business management and future of computing.

In 1991, he earned the Leonardo da Vinci Award for having developed a ground-breaking machine, the Programma 101, an early programmable calculator.

The 12222 Perotto, a main belt asteroid, discovered in 1982 at the Osservatorio San Vittore in Bologna, is named after him.

== Programma 101 ==
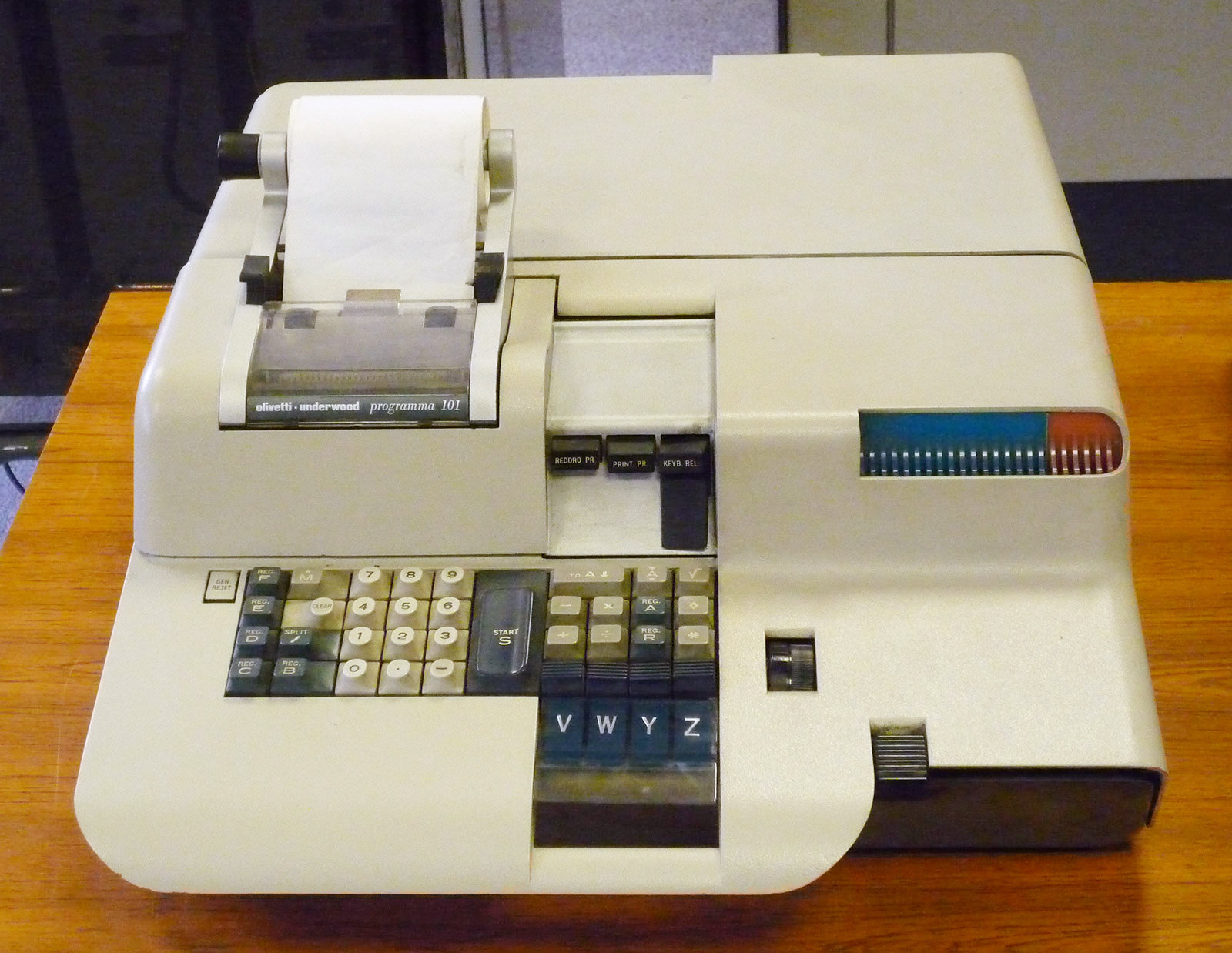
Front view of a Programma 101 at the National Museum of Computing in Bletchley Park

The innovative calculator, also known as Perottina, named after its inventor, was one of the first electronic desktop calculators in history purposely designed to be programmable. Programma 101 was officially launched at the 1964 New York World's Fair, attracting major interest from the public and the press. Volume production started in 1965, selling about 44,000 units primarily in the US market. NASA bought ten models and used them to plan the Apollo 11 landing on the Moon.

By Apollo 11 we had a desktop computer, sort of, kind of, called an Olivetti Programma 101. It was a kind of supercalculator. It was probably a foot and a half square, and about maybe eight inches tall. It would add, subtract, multiply, and divide, but it would remember a sequence of these things, and it would record that sequence on a magnetic card, a magnetic strip that was about a foot long and two inches wide. So you could write a sequence, a programming sequence, and load it in there, and then if you would — the Lunar Module high-gain antenna was not very smart, it didn't know where Earth was. [...] We would have to run four separate programs on this Programma 101 [...]

— David W. Whittle, 2006

== See also ==
- List of pioneers in computer science
