= Elisa Montessori =

Italian painter (born 1931)

- Born: 1931; Genoa, Italy
- Known for: Painting
- Spouse: Mario Tchou (1955–1961)

Elisa Montessori (born 1931) is an Italian painter.

== Biography ==
Montessori was born in Genoa on 18 June 1931. She has been living and working in Trastevere in Rome since the mid-1950s, where she owns a studio.

She has been interested in drawing since childhood. She studied classical subjects and graduated with a humanities degree in 1953 from La Sapienza University in Rome. After graduation, she was trained at Mirko Basaldella's studio, where she met with the Gruppo Origine: Ettore Colla, Alberto Burri, and Giuseppe Capogrossi. With Basaldella, she started experimenting with techniques such as egg tempera, ceramics, goldworking, and engraving.

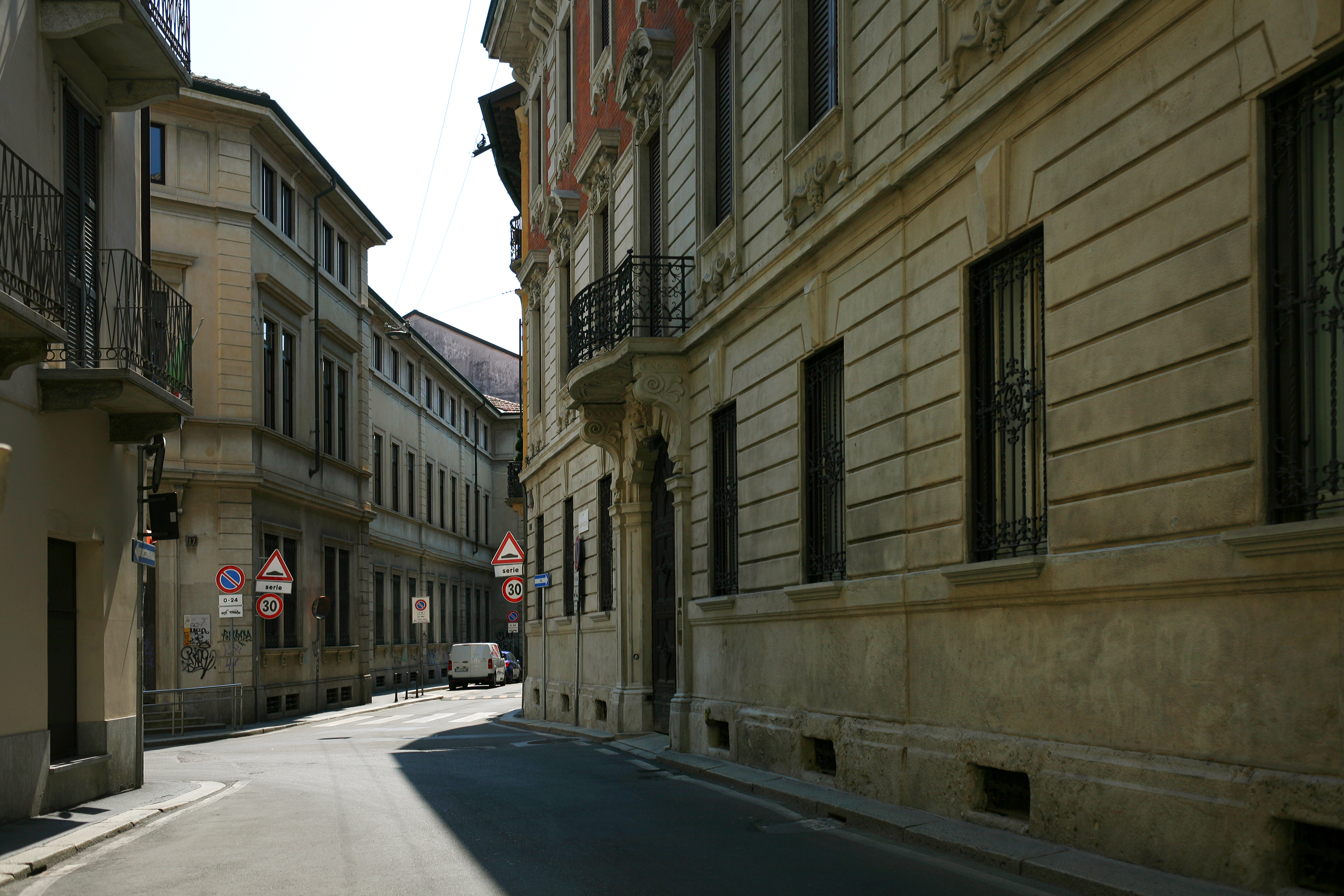
Via Cappuccio in Milan, where Montessori lived with her husband

In 1955, Montessori won a student grant to go to Paris but decided to stay in Rome after her meeting with scientist Mario Tchou, who became her husband the same year. Montessori and Tchou moved to Milan and had two daughters. Their house in Milan on Via Cappuccio was designed by the architect Ettore Sottsass. Sotsass and Tchou were friends through their involvement in the Olivetti Elea project. Following the sudden death of Tchou in a car accident while on his way to Olivetti's headquarters in Ivrea in 1961, Montessori relocated to Rome. She would later marry Costantino Dardi, an architect, and have a third daughter.

== Work ==
Montessori's work is multifaceted, using many different techniques. Asian culture was a strong source of inspiration, for example, in the series of her notebooks and exhibition at Galleria Giulia in 2011.

One important aspect of her production starting from the 1980s was the role of the illustration and the relationship between image and text in both poetry and literature. She produced works inspired by the work of Shakespeare, Sylvia Plath, Patrizia Valduga, Emily Dickinson, Marianne Moore, Ingeborg Bachmann and Laura Lilli.

== Works in museums ==
Her works are part of the permanent collection at the Museum of Contemporary Art of Rome (MACRO), the Galleria Comunale d'Arte Moderna, Rome, and the Farnesina Palace in Rome. Since 2010, a portrait representing the fragmentation of her body is part of the collection at the Uffizi in Florence,

== Acknowledgements ==
- Premio Internazionale "Leonardo Paterna Baldizzi"
- In 2004, filmmaker Francesco Vaccaro made a documentary about her work.

== Selected exhibitions ==
=== Group exhibitions ===
- Frauen in der Kunst, Orangerie of Charlottenburg Palace, Berlin (1977)
- Aperto 82, XL Venice Biennale (1982)
- XVII São Paulo Art Biennial (1983)
- XI Rome Quadriennale (1986)
- Ofelia '86, Istituto Italiano di Cultura, Paris (1986)
- II Istanbul Biennial (1989)
- Rotoli, Lavori in corso 6, Galleria Comunale d'Arte Moderna of Rome (1999)
- Castello di San Giorgio, Maccarese (2001)
- Mostra d'Arte Contemporanea, Palazzo della Farnesina, Rome (2001)
- Le muse sono donne, Teatro Argentina, Rome (2001)
- Galleria di Palazzo Corsini, Rome (2006)
- Donne d'arte: dieci donne astratte, Galleria Cortese & Lisanti, Rome (2007)
- Autoritratti di artiste da Catania a Woodman, Museo Hendrik Christian Andersen, Rome (2007).
- In nome e nel ricordo di Carla Mendini, Galleria Giulia, Rome (2008).
- Autoritratte: Artiste di capriccioso e destrissimo ingegno, Galleria degli Uffizi, Florence, curated by Giovanna Giusti (2010).
- Italian Pavillon at the LIV Venice Biennale (2011), selected by Claudia Salaris.
- Con Goethe in Italia, (with Michaela Maria Langenstein and Claudia Peill), Casa di Goethe, Rome (2016)
- Vita, morte, miracoli: L'arte della longevità, Museo Villa Croce, Genoa (2018)

=== Solo exhibitions ===
- Duetto (with Vittorio Gregotti) organized for the realization of the folder Dietro l’albero di Seghers (1981). A.A.M. Architettura Arte Moderna, Rome. Curated by Francesco Moschini.
- Galleria Arco d'Alibert, Rome (1986)
- La bellezza della luna, Il Triangolo Nero, Alessandria (1987)
- Pastel drawings of William Shakespeare's The Tempest, Biblioteca Casanatense, Rome (1988).
- Pannelli del fiume e della valle, San Polo d'Enza (1988)
- Le memorie del bianco, ex carcere del Sant'Uffizio (1992)
- Omaggio a Ingeborg Bachmann (with G. Beitling), Palazzo delle Esposizioni, Rome (1993)
- Galleria Mazzocchi, Parma (1994)
- Claudio Verna and Elisa Montessori, Museo Laboratorio Arte Contemporanea of La Sapienza, Rome (1999)
- Museo Hendrik Christian Andersen, Rome (2002).
- Galleria Giulia, Rome (2004)
- Frammenti dall' Orto Botanico, Elle Arte, Palermo (2004).
- Shanghai Blues, Galleria Nazionale d'Arte Moderna, Rome (2006)
- Confini di carta, Galleria Nuvole, Montesarchio (2008)
- Villa Giulia, Rome (2011)
- Monitor, Rome (2016)
- Casa delle Letterature, Rome (2017)
- Italian Cultural Institute, London (2019)

== Bibliography ==
- Mantura, Bruno (1983). "Elisa Montessori". 17ª Bienal de São Paulo – Catálogo (in Portuguese). São Paulo Art Biennial. Archived from the original on 16 February 2018.
- Molinari, Dino (1987). Elisa Montessori: La bellezza della Luna. Il Triangolo Nero, Alessandria.
- Malatesta, Stefano (2004). Elisa Montessori: Frammenti dall'Orto Botanico. Elle Arte, Palermo.
- De Candio, Mario (2009). Farfalle. Rome, Italy: Edizioni Il Ponte.
- Sauzeau, Anne Marie (2014). Sotto il segno di Dafne, Indagine sull'opera di Elisa Montessori. Punctum Press.
