= Olivetti Quaderno =

1992 subnotebook produced by Olivetti

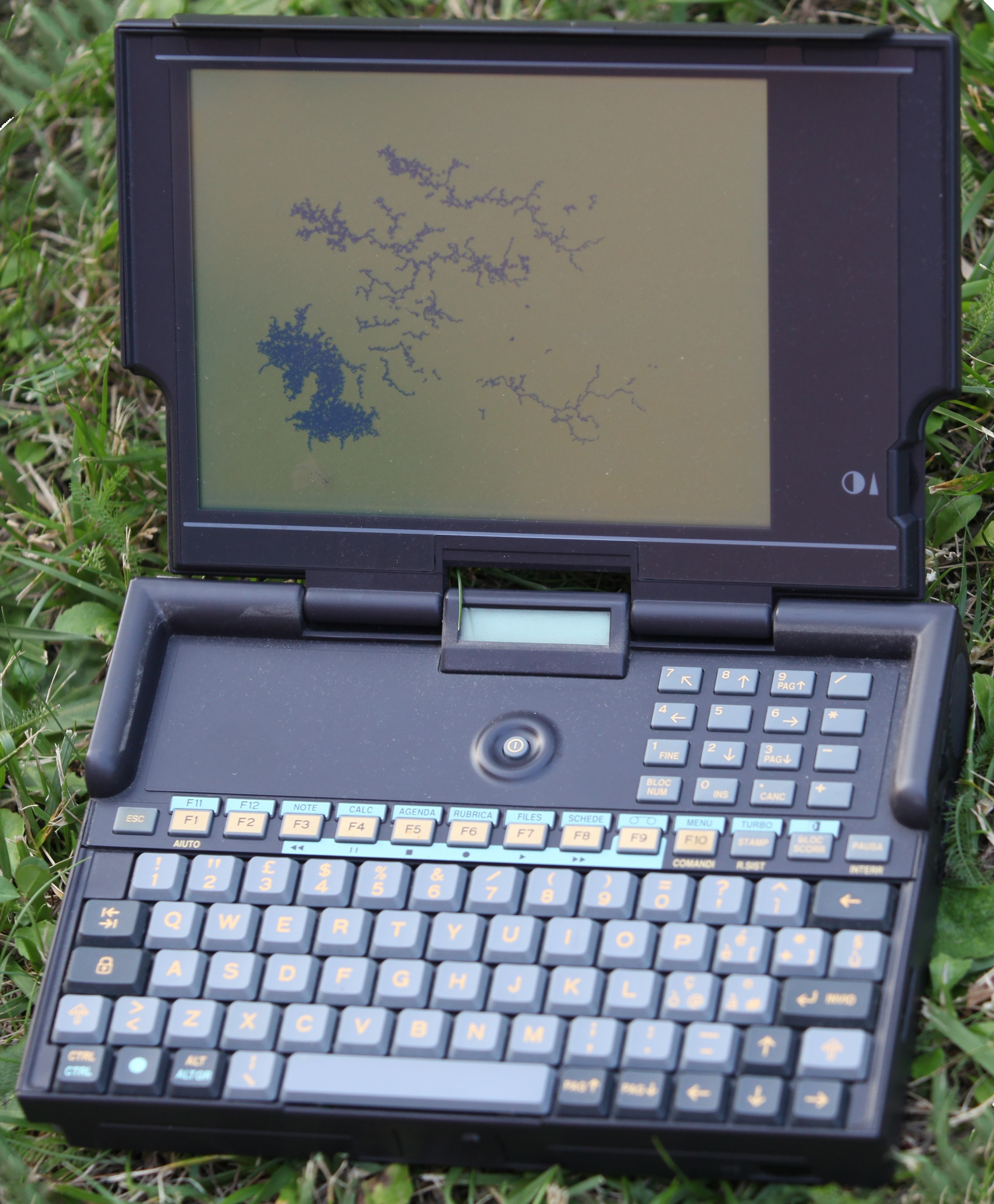
- Quaderno PT-XT-20
- Developer: Olivetti
- Type: Laptop (subnotebook)
- Released: 1992
- Discontinued: 1994

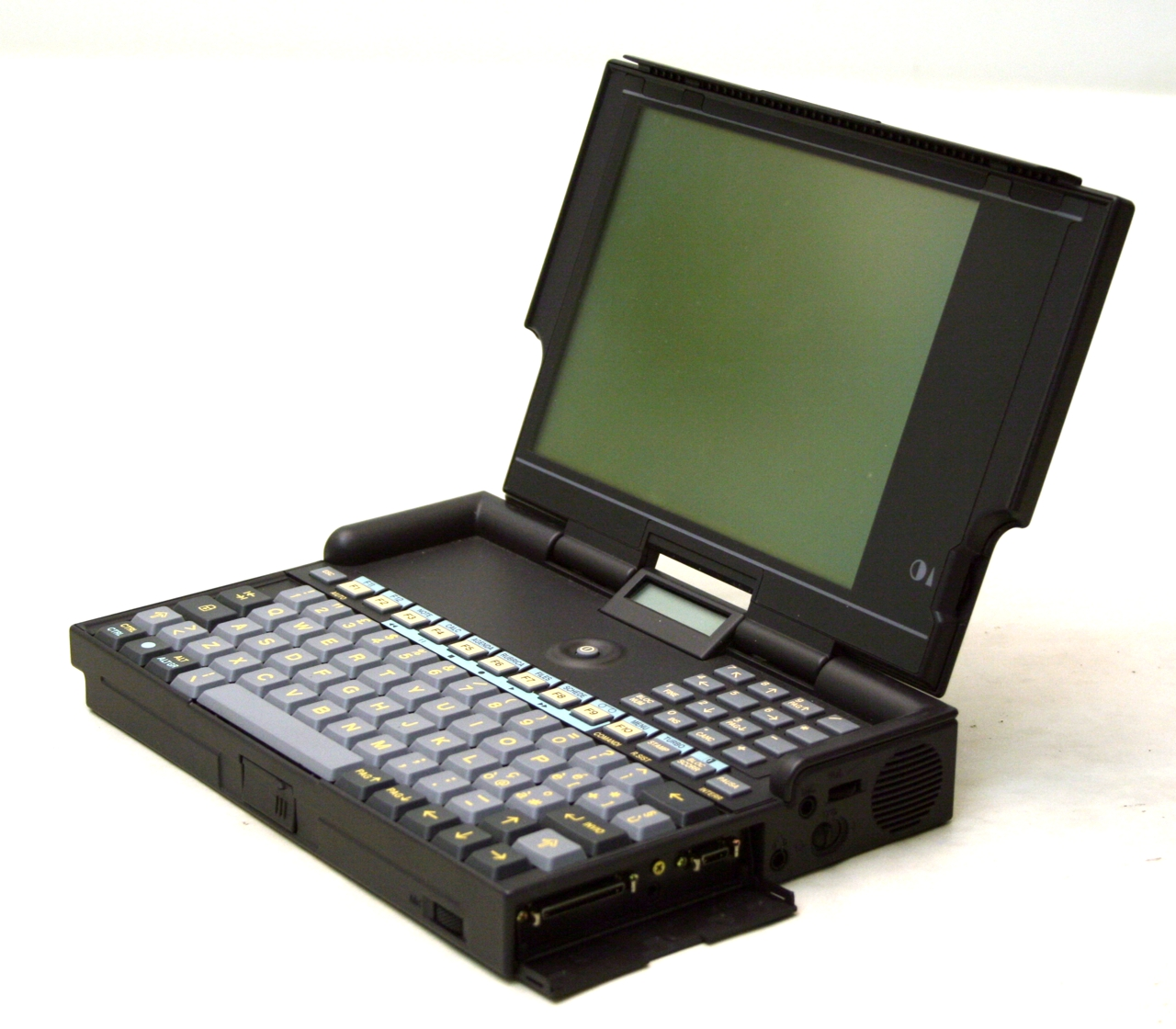
Olivetti Quaderno PT-XT-20, side photo

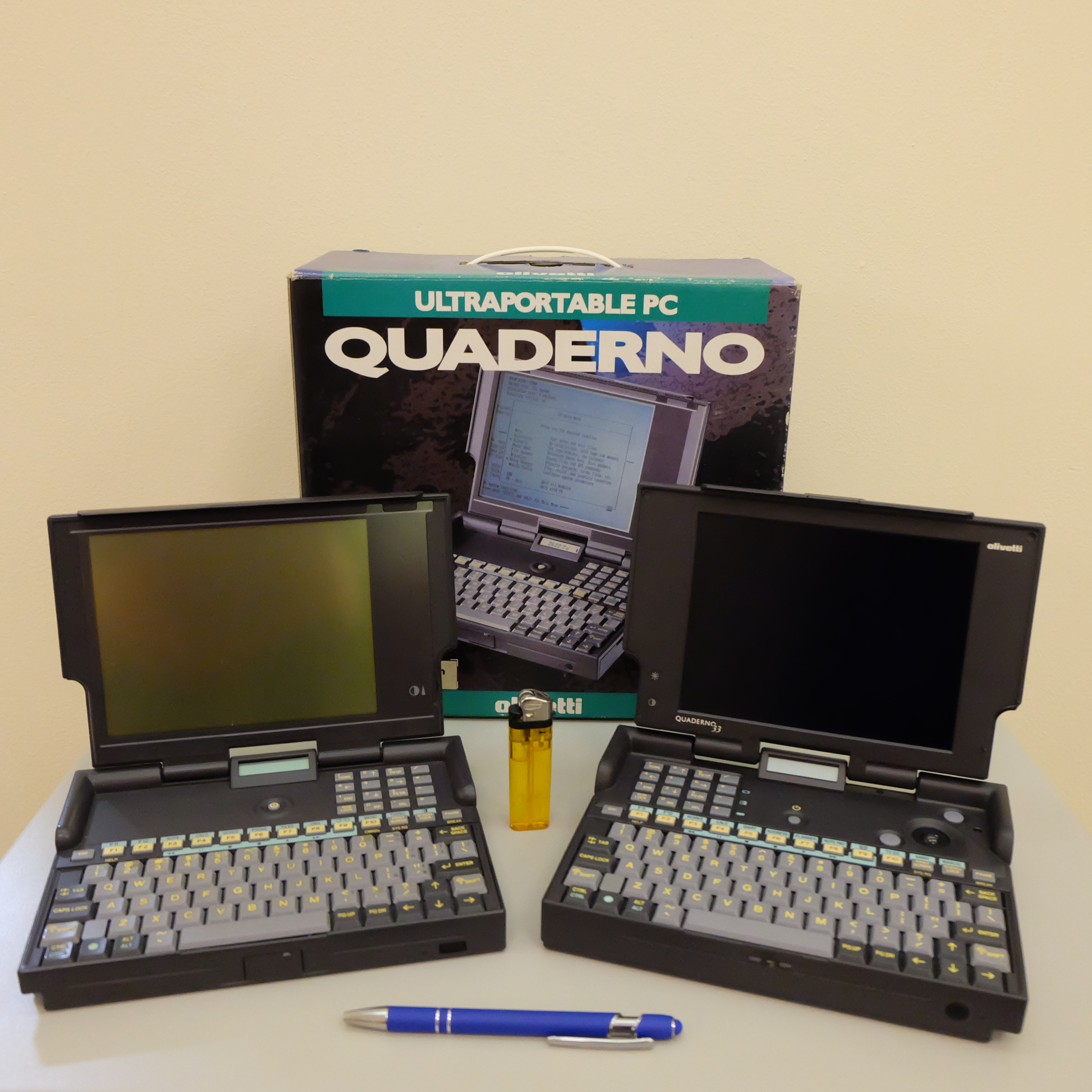
Olivetti Quaderno 20 and Olivetti Quaderno 33 – RetroComputer museum Zatec, Czechia

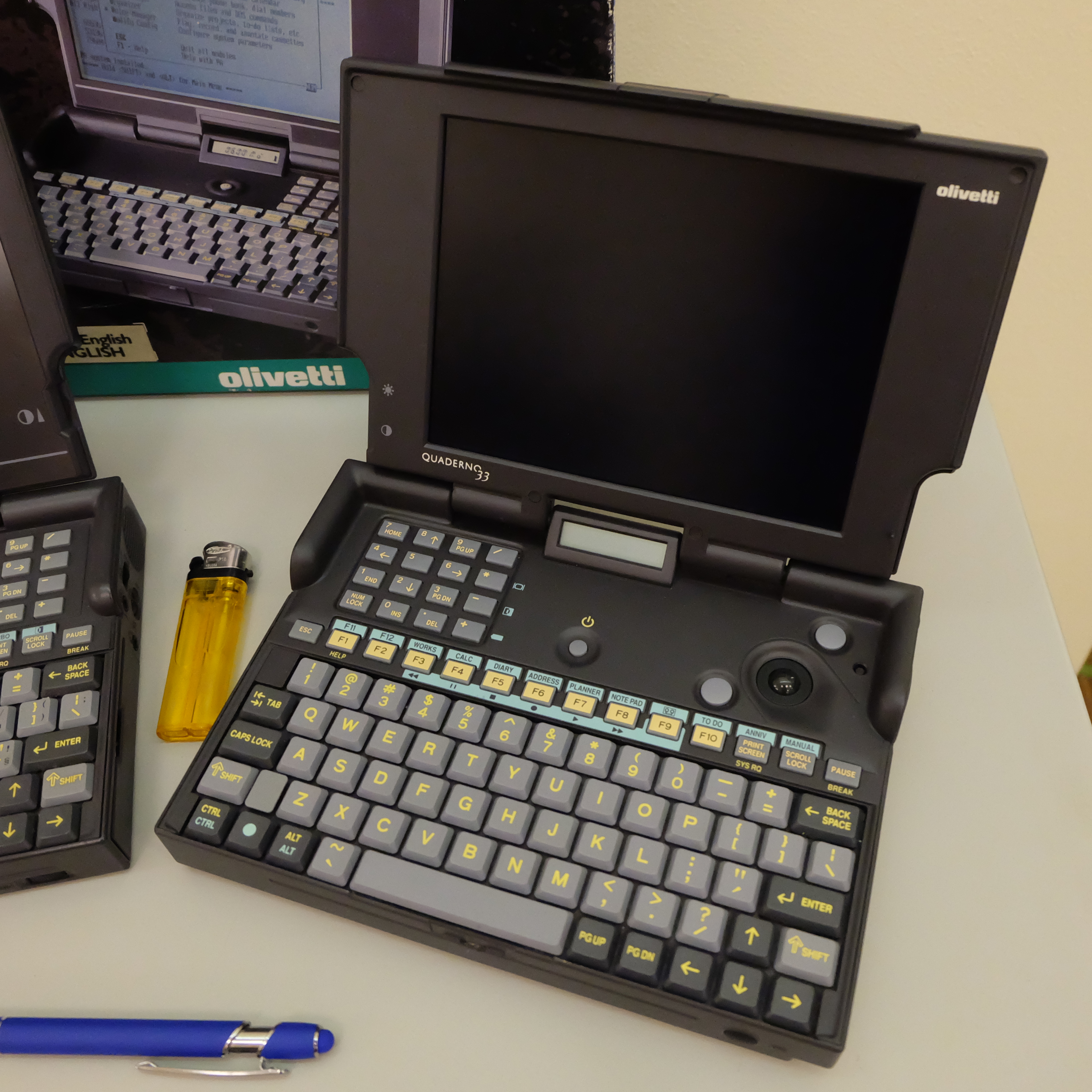
Olivetti Quaderno 33 (PT-AT-60) – RetroComputer museum Zatec, Czechia

The Quaderno was a subnotebook produced by Olivetti in two versions from 1992: Quaderno (PT-XT-20) and Quaderno 33 (PT-AT-60).

== History ==
When it made its debut in 1992, this model realised the idea of a laptop that was smaller (having the same footprint as an A5 sheet) and lighter (1 kg) than contemporary laptops. The first version did not have the expected success, despite having an excellent processor and also features unknown to its contemporaries, such as the microphone and integrated amplifiers. This failure was mostly due to the limitations of the operating system and bundled software which did not fully exploit the potential of the computer's design and capabilities. For this reason, Olivetti decided to present a new version just one year after the first, the Quaderno 33, equipped with the Windows 3.1 operating system.

== Reception ==
In a 1993 review, the original Quaderno was described as "a crippled DOS-compatible machine with an NEC V30 processor equivalent to an Intel 8086", noting that "the best thing about the old Quaderno was its ability to digitally record dictation using its built-in microphone". These voice recording capabilities were exposed by "cassette deck" controls on the top of the case, and with the internal fax modem connected to the telephone network, the computer could act as an answering machine and record voice messages. Despite providing an array of expansion ports – serial, parallel, video out, and a dual-purpose port for modem or PS/2 keyboard and mouse – the sockets were a proprietary Olivetti design requiring special cables at about £10 each (equivalent to £22 in 2025), and to use the fax modem required an extra £80 (equivalent to £177) purchase of the necessary software, this being regarded as rather exploitative.

The keyboard offered a standard layout and additional function keys, with the latter acting as shortcuts to launch applications, although unlike other laptops, the software to support these capabilities was loaded from the hard drive and not from ROM, thus requiring the user to retain the driver files responsible. The reduced size of the keyboard was not always well received, with claims that touch-typing was not possible on the small keys and that two-finger typing was therefore necessary. In contrast to the earlier Quaderno model, whose principal software was "a suite of personal productivity applications", the latter model came with Windows 3.1, Microsoft Works and Lotus Organizer. A more capable VGA-resolution display was welcomed, along with its integration with the power management regime that permitted a battery life of up to six hours on the standard nickel-cadmium batteries.

== Awards ==
The Quaderno received the following awards:

- 1992, 25° Premio SMAU Industrial Design (Italia)
- 1993, IF Product Design Award (Germany)

== Notable users ==
Terry Pratchett used a 1992 Quaderno for writing when travelling.

== Specifications ==
- Scheme: Ugo Carena and Alessandro Santalucia
- Design: Mario Bellini and Hagai Shvadron

=== Quaderno (PT-XT-20) ===
- CPU: NEC μPD70280 V51, integrating a 16 MHz NEC V30HL core with a set of PC peripherals
- Memory: 1 MB (640 KB + 360 KB LIM expansion)
- Hard disk: 20 MB, 2.5-inch
- Operating system: MS-DOS 5.0
- PCMCIA: Type II
- Dimensions: 210 × 148 × 32 mm
- Mass: 1.05 kg
- Display: 14 × 10.5 cm LCD, DCGA (640 × 400), 4 grey levels
- Battery: 6 AA batteries Ni-Cd 7.2V

=== Quaderno 33 (PT-AT-60) ===
Differences from the earlier model:

- CPU: 20 MHz AMD 386SXLV
- Memory: 4 MB (expandable with PCMCIA RAM card to 12 MB)
- Hard disk: 60 MB
- Operating system: MS-DOS 5.0 with Windows 3.1
- Input device: integrated trackball
- Display: 7-inch LCD with backlight, VGA (640 × 480), 16 grey levels
- Dimensions: 210 × 148 × 42 mm
- Mass: 1.35 kg
- Battery: Ni-Cd batteries, option for Ni-MH batteries

== Literature ==
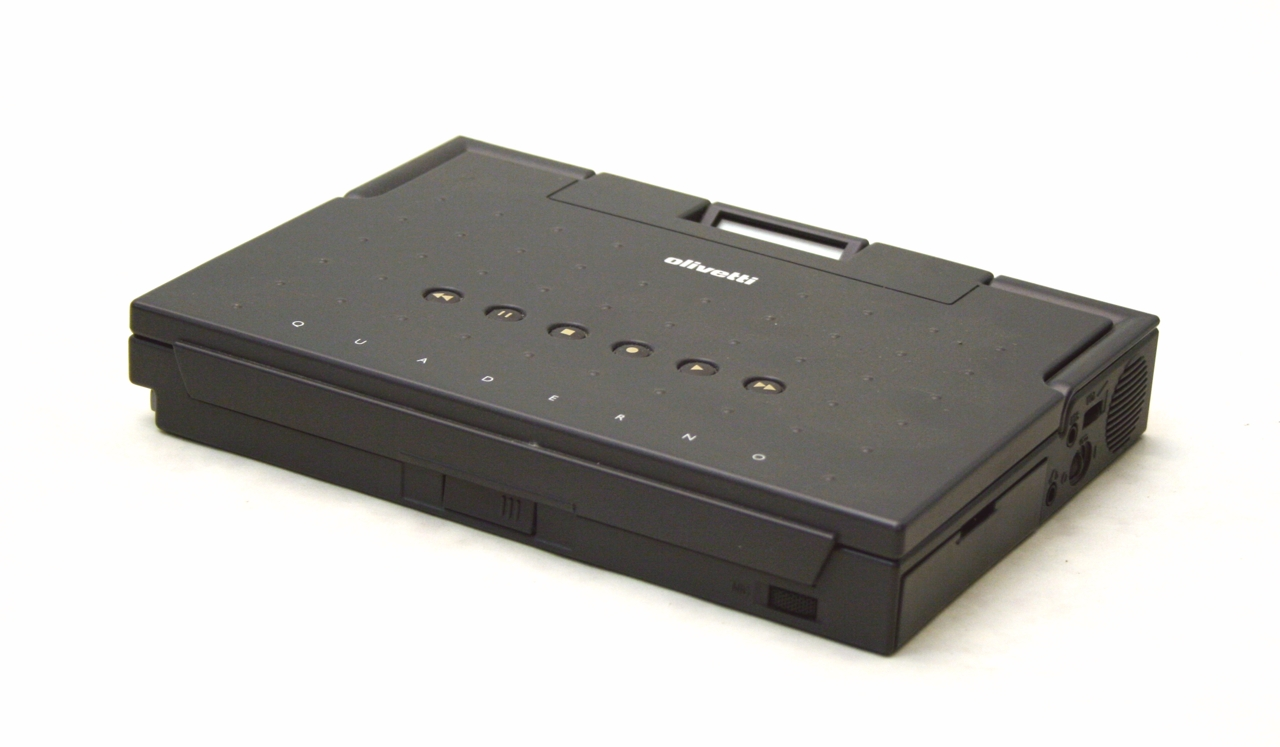
Top cover with multimedia buttons

- Olivetti Quaderno: più di un notebook in metà spazio MCmicrocomputer (June 1992) pages 118–121
- Olivetti Quaderno MCmicrocomputer (July/August 1992) pages 128–130
- Olivetti Quaderno 33 MCmicrocomputer (July/August 1993) pages 154–158
