= Olivetti X/OS =

X/OS
- Developer: Olivetti
- OS family: Unix, BSD
- Working state: Historic

X/OS was a Unix operating system from the computer manufacturer Olivetti. It was based on 4.2BSD with some UNIX System V support. It ran on their LSX line of computers, which was based on the Motorola 68000-series CPUs.
