= Olivetti Elea =

Series of mainframe computers

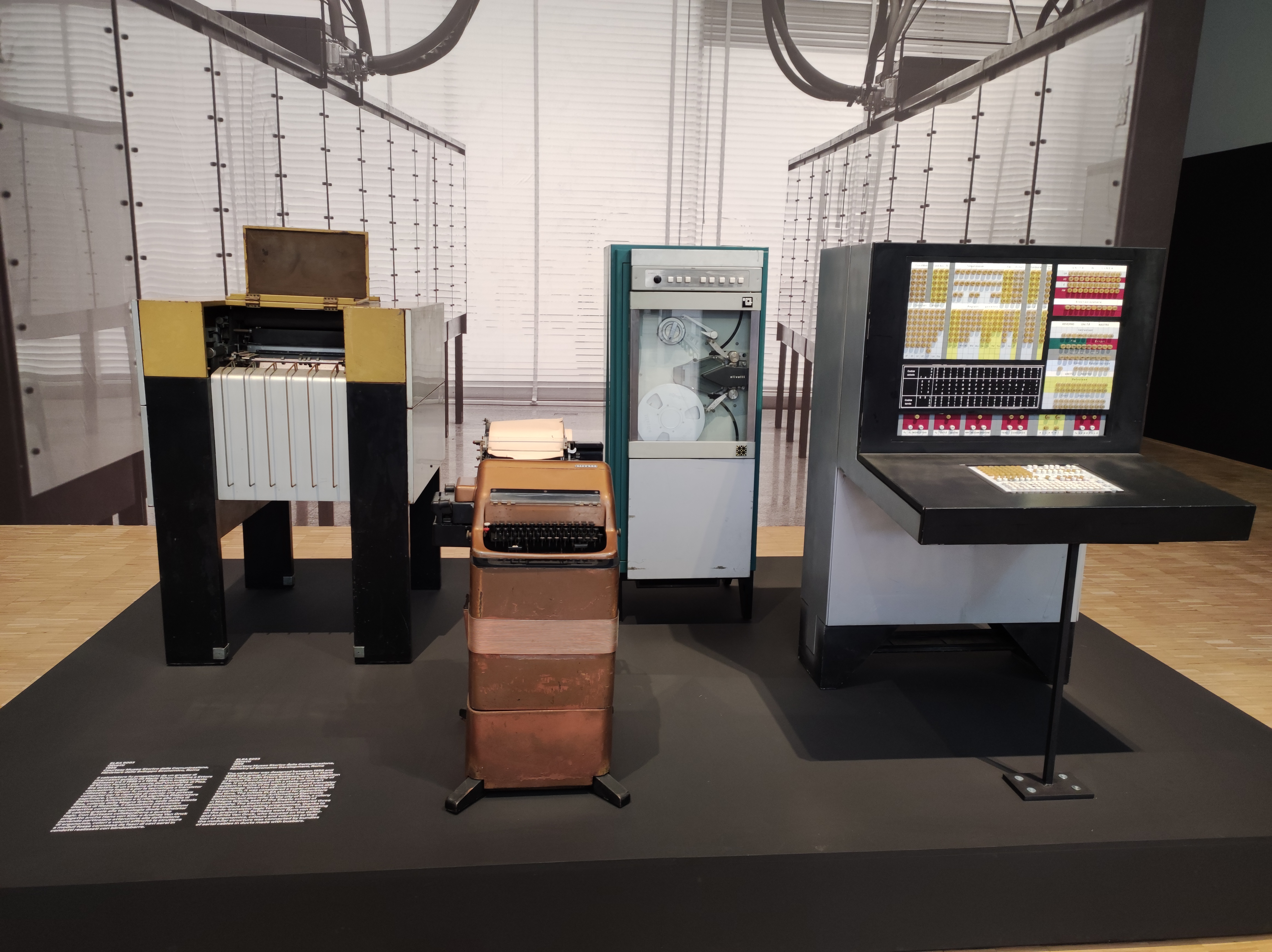
- Several computers from Olivetti's Elea line
- Manufacturer: Olivetti
- Product family: Elea
- Type: Mainframe
- Released: 1957 (Machine Zero)

The Elea was a series of mainframe computers Olivetti developed starting in the late 1950s. The system, made entirely with transistors for high performance, was conceived, designed and developed by a small group of researchers led by Mario Tchou (1924–1961), with industrial design by Ettore Sottsass. The ELEA 9001 was the first solid-state computer designed and manufactured in Italy. The acronym ELEA stood for Elaboratore Elettronico Aritmetico (Arithmetical Electronic Computer, then changed to Elaboratore Elettronico Automatico for marketing reasons) and was chosen with reference to the ancient Greek colony of Elea, home of the Eleatic school of philosophy. About forty units were placed with customers. In August 1964, only a few years after releasing the 9003, Olivetti's mainframe business was sold to GE.

== Generations ==
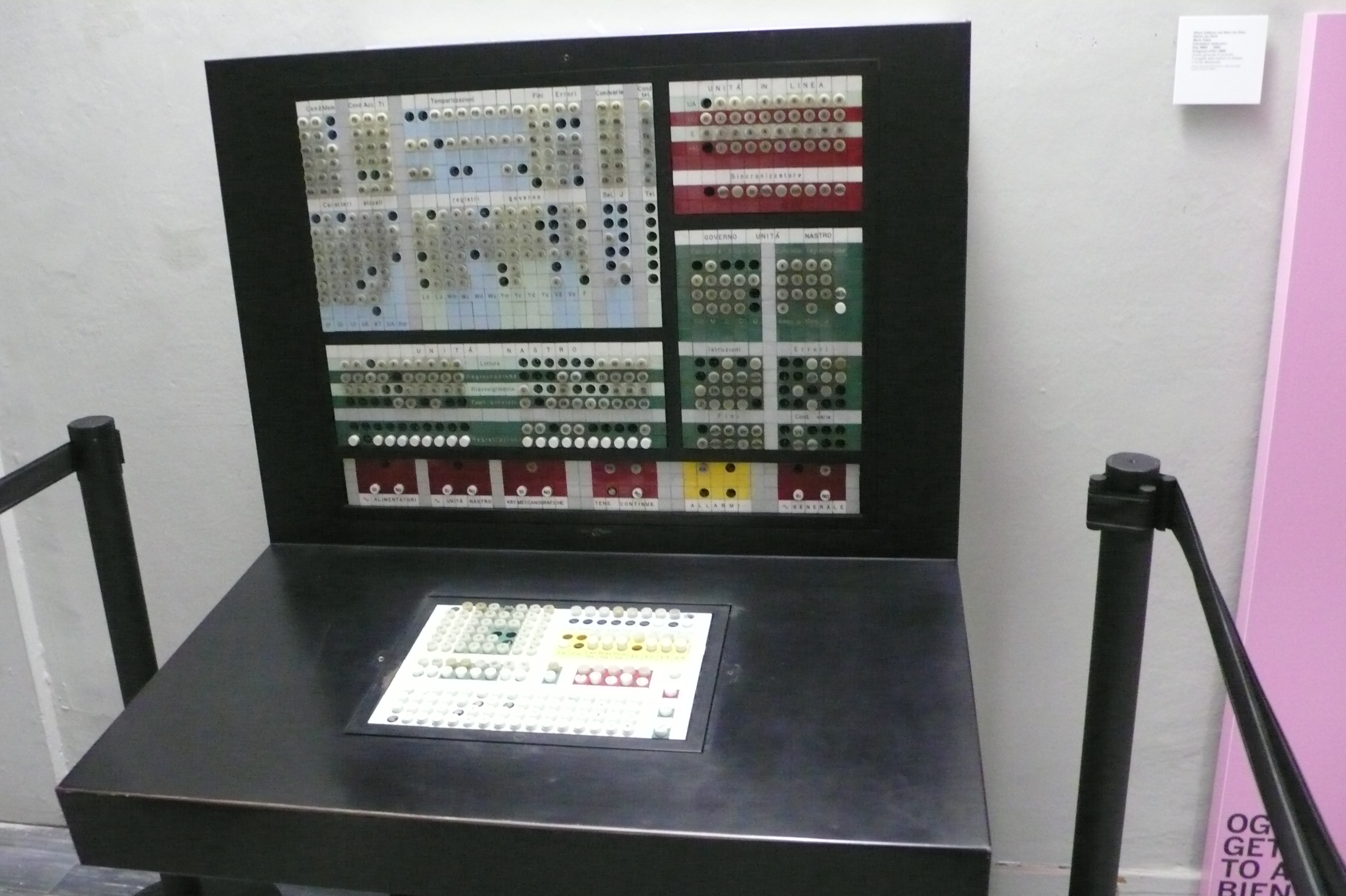
Central console unit of Elea 9003

ELEA 9001: (Macchina Zero – Machine Zero) prototype was made with vacuum tubes, but used germanium transistors for the tape drive system. The system was completed in spring 1957 and was later sent to Ivrea where for six years it controlled the Olivetti production warehouses. The machine was a prototype.

ELEA 9002: (Macchina 1V – Machine 1V), 1958, was a prototype with printed circuits and optimized design, much faster than its predecessor and utilizing silicon transistors for the management of tape drives. The machine was used as a test for the transistors, to establish if they were more reliable and economic than vacuum tubes. This model was installed at the Olivetti headquarters in Via Clerici in Milan and presented at the Milan Trade Fair in April 1959. It was also awarded the Compasso d'Oro in 1959.

ELEA 9003: (Macchina 1T – Machine 1T), prototype in 1958, announced in 1959, designed entirely in discrete (diode–transistor logic), and following the previous year's announcement of the IBM 7070 transistorized computer, was one of the first fully transistorized commercial computers. It was leased to about 40 individual customers, of which the first (Elea 9003/01) was installed at the textile company Marzotto and second (Elea 9003/02) to Monte dei Paschi di Siena. Later this unit was donated for educational purposes to the "Enrico Fermi" Technical High School in Bibbiena, where it is still in use today. Other mainframes were leased to insurance companies and energy companies.

The Olivetti computers competed directly with foreign manufacturers such as IBM and Ferranti, but received no special consideration from the Italian government. Typical applications were payroll, inventory and accounting.

ELEA 6001: A smaller version of the 9003 with the intent of either scientific or commercial use – two separate versions (6001/S and 6001/C) being created respectively for these purposes. Presented at the Milan Trade Fair in 1961. Around 150 units were produced. Unlike previous models, third party programming languages including COBOL and Fortran were used, in addition to a specific program created by mathematician Mauro Pacelli.

ELEA 4001: A computer of reduced size and power compared to previous models, intended to be used in businesses. It was designed to be a stand-alone system but could also be connected with other computers. No examples of the ELEA 4001 are known to have survived to this day.

ELEA 4115/ GE 115: Initially released as the ELEA 4115 and later renamed to GE 115, after General Electric acquired the Olivetti Electronics Division. The computer was part of the GE 100 line, and was the smallest of these models. Around 5000 were sold worldwide.

== Features ==
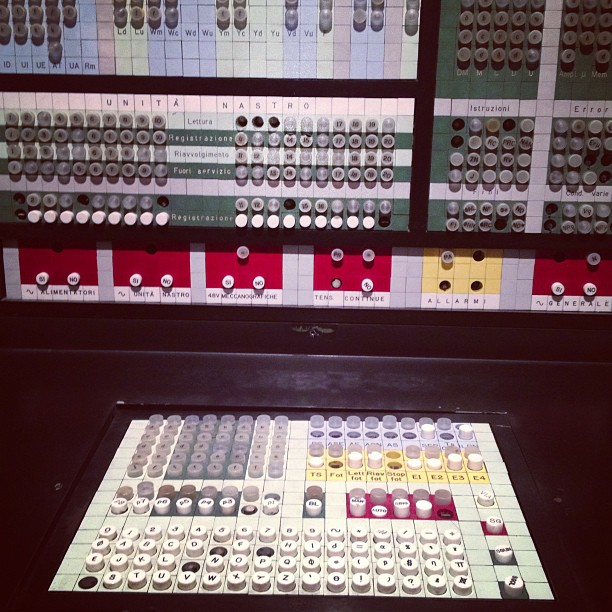
The keyboard of the Elea

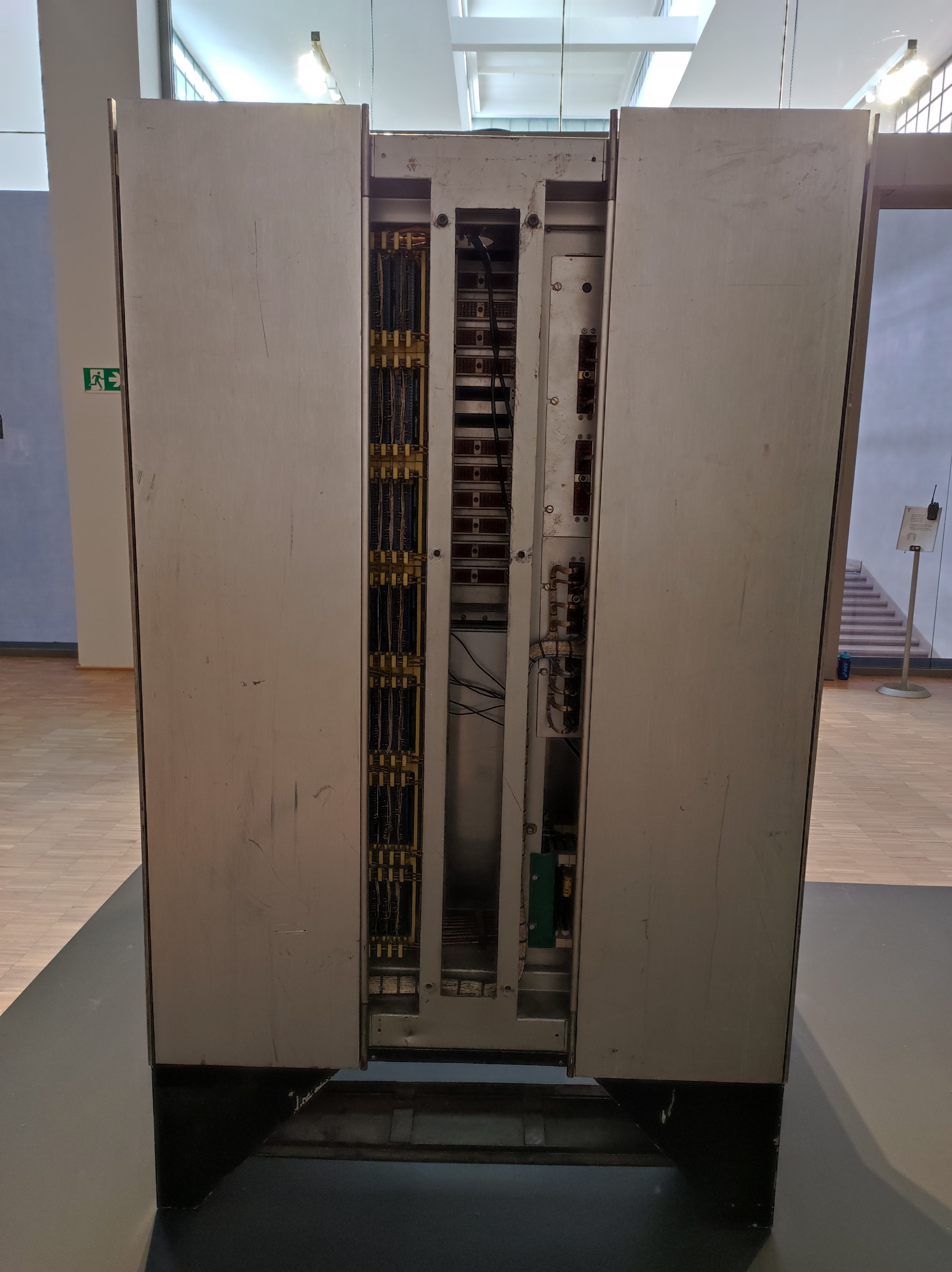
Back side of the Elea

The computing power (approximately 8 to 10,000 instructions per second) was higher than that of competitors for several years. Uptime – as with all computers of the time – was less than 50%, especially in the tape device. This meant the computer was available for productive work only part of the day, and then returned to technicians for maintenance.

The need to obtain 300,000 highly reliable transistors and diodes for each computer, convinced Adriano Olivetti to build a foundry called SGS in cooperation with the company Telettra . SGS (Società Generale Semiconduttori) later became part of STMicroelectronics.

The computer was equipped with words of 6 bits, plus a parity bit, and word mark bit, with ferrite core memories. Memory was organized in six-bit characters, representing letters, numerals and punctuation. The memory cycle frequency was 100 kHz, with a capacity between 20 and 160 thousand words. The computer did not have an operating system and could be programmed using machine language. The 9003 did not have floating point arithmetic instructions since it was intended for commercial data processing. All instructions were of fixed length (eight characters).

Mass storage for the 9003 was on magnetic tape. Drum, disk and diskette memory was developed but never used at a customer site. Input and output was through punched paper tape or punched cards, and printing on a line printer. A teleprinter was used as operator console to control the machine, with a front panel display for debugging and maintenance.

The industrial design of the system followed Olivetti esthetic and functional standards. Cabinets were about 1 metre high and interconnected by overhead conduits, so the system did not require the raised floor of other mainframe designs. Each cabinet contained a subsystem (processor, memory, tape drives).

== Developments ==
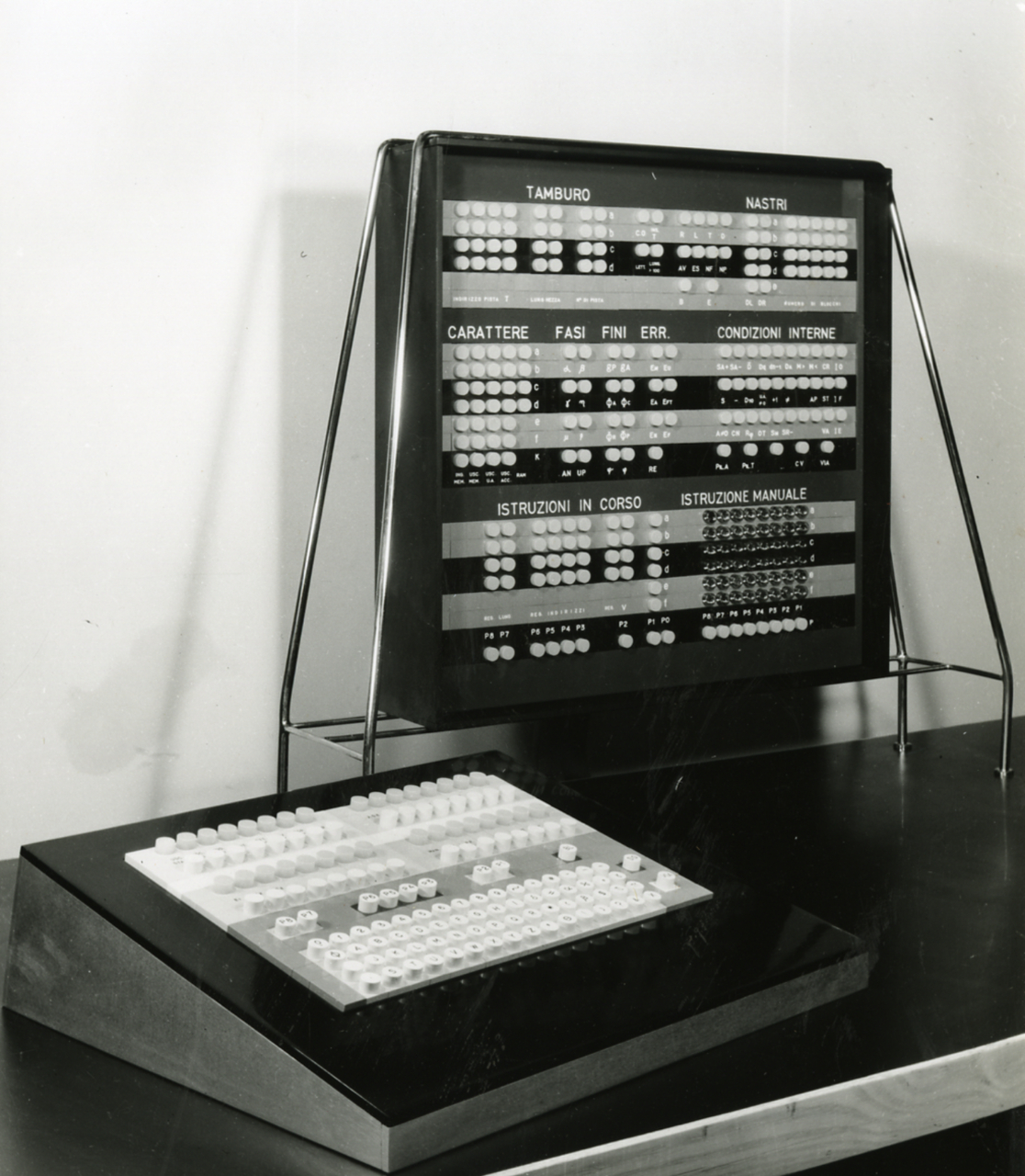
Elea 9001 console. Photo by Paolo Monti, 1968

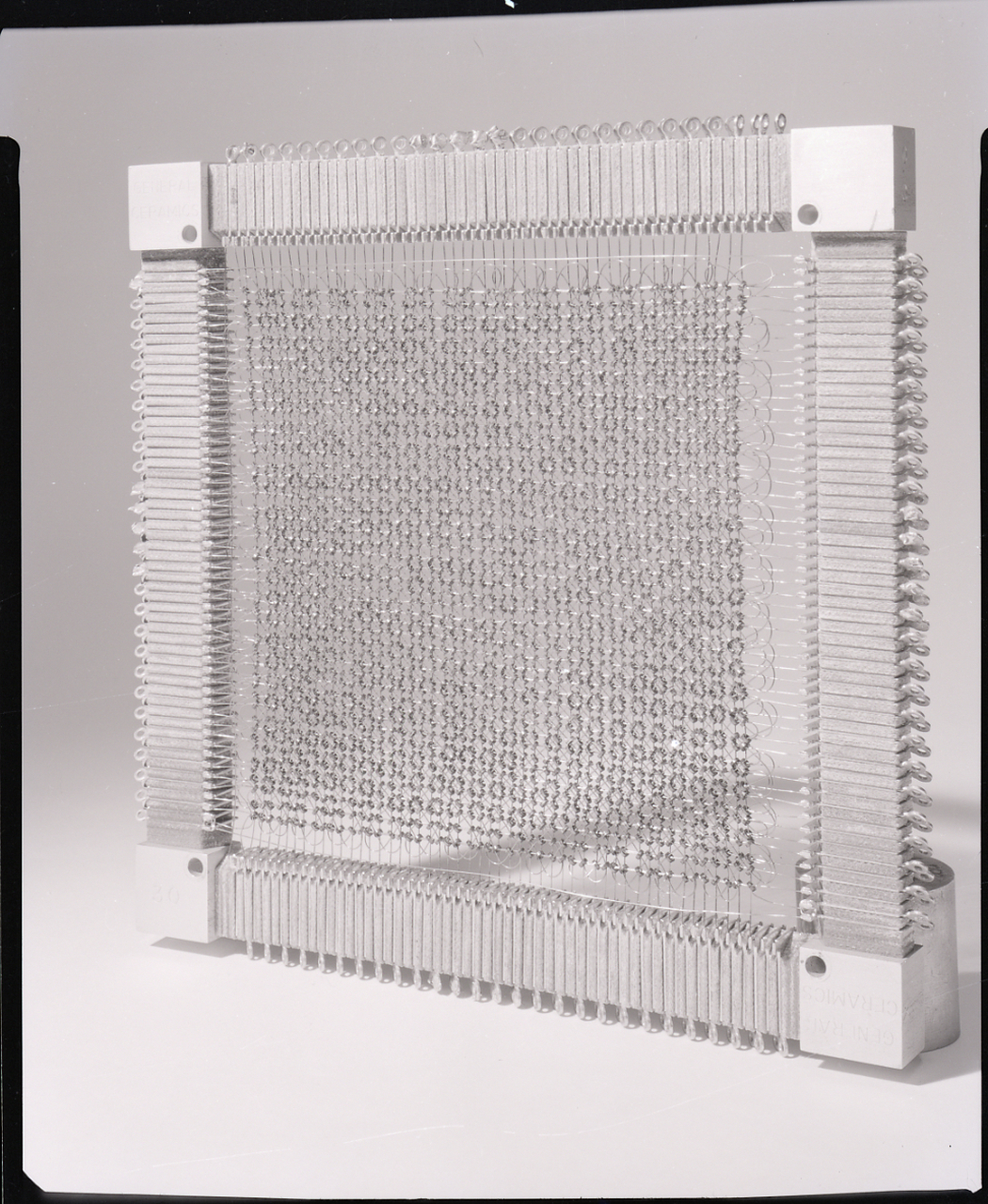
Memory buffer of magnetic cores with ferrite rings. Photo by Paolo Monti, 1960.

The Elea 6000 series were versions with reduced processing power and cost. They were originally designed for scientific computing with floating-point arithmetic, 4-bit memory width, then later developed for commercial applications (4+4 bits), with a microprogram memory. About 170 units were produced. The Elea 4000, was a later series that was successfully sold by General Electric after it purchased Olivetti's computer interests. Over 40,000 units were sold with the GE model names GE 105, GE-115, GE-125, and GE-130.

The laboratories had also begun to develop a successor to the 9000 series that features a new hardware architecture. The company developed a programming language Palgol, a derivative of ALGOL, and an assembler named Psyche. However, only a limited amount of system and utility software was provided by Olivetti to customers. The death of the engineers Olivetti and Tchou put a brake on laboratory work, which was subsequently sold to General Electric. This marked the end of Elea computers.

Even though the electronics division of Olivetti had been sold off, the knowledge gained was applied in the development of the successful Programma 101 electronic calculator.
