= Olivetti P6066 =

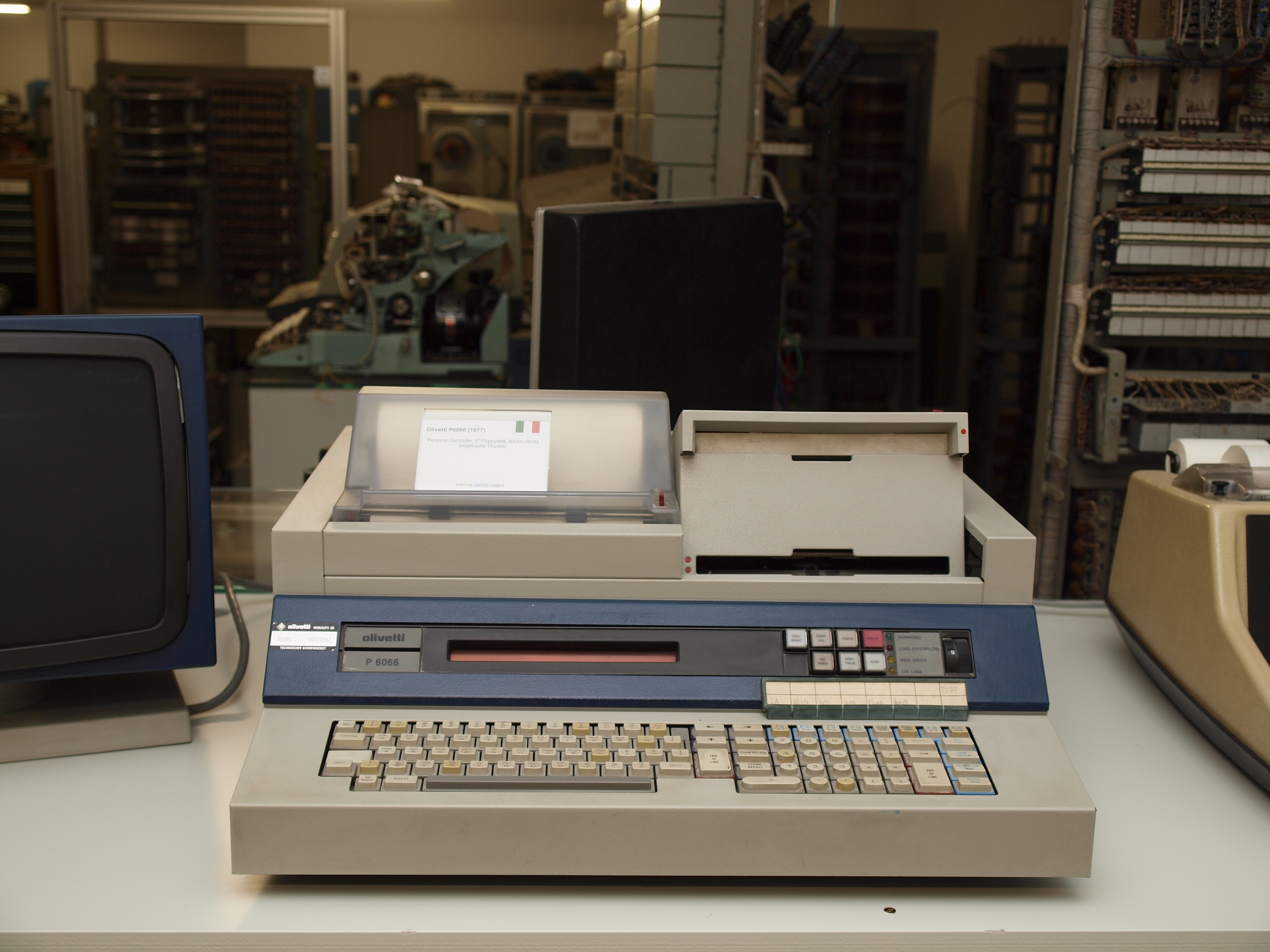
- The Olivetti P6066 portable computer

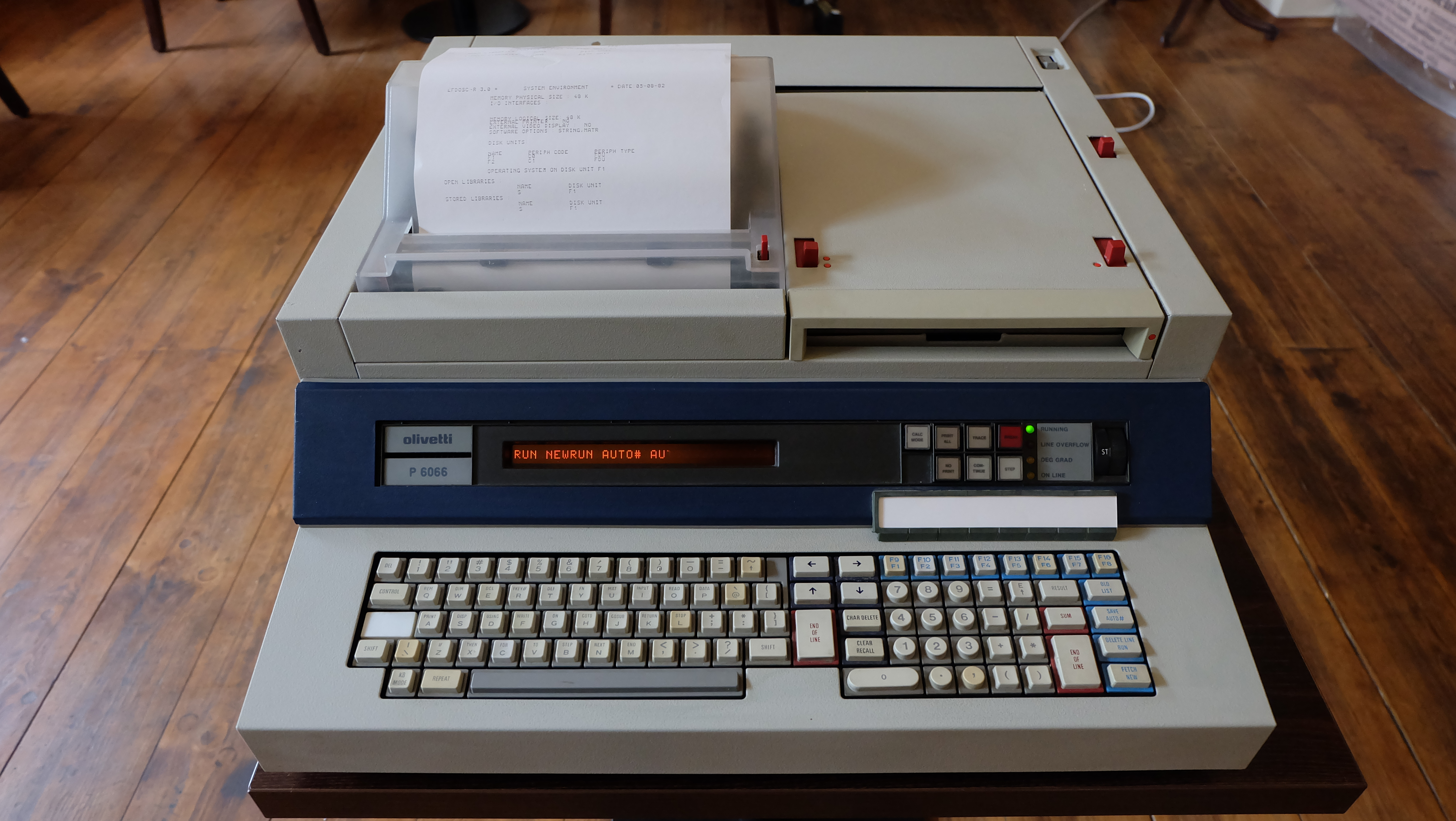
- Manufacturer: Olivetti Olivetti P6066
- Type: Personal computer
- Released: April 1975; 51 years ago
- Operating system: BASIC
- CPU: TTL based
- Input: Keyboard
- Predecessor: Olivetti P6060
- Successor: Olivetti M20

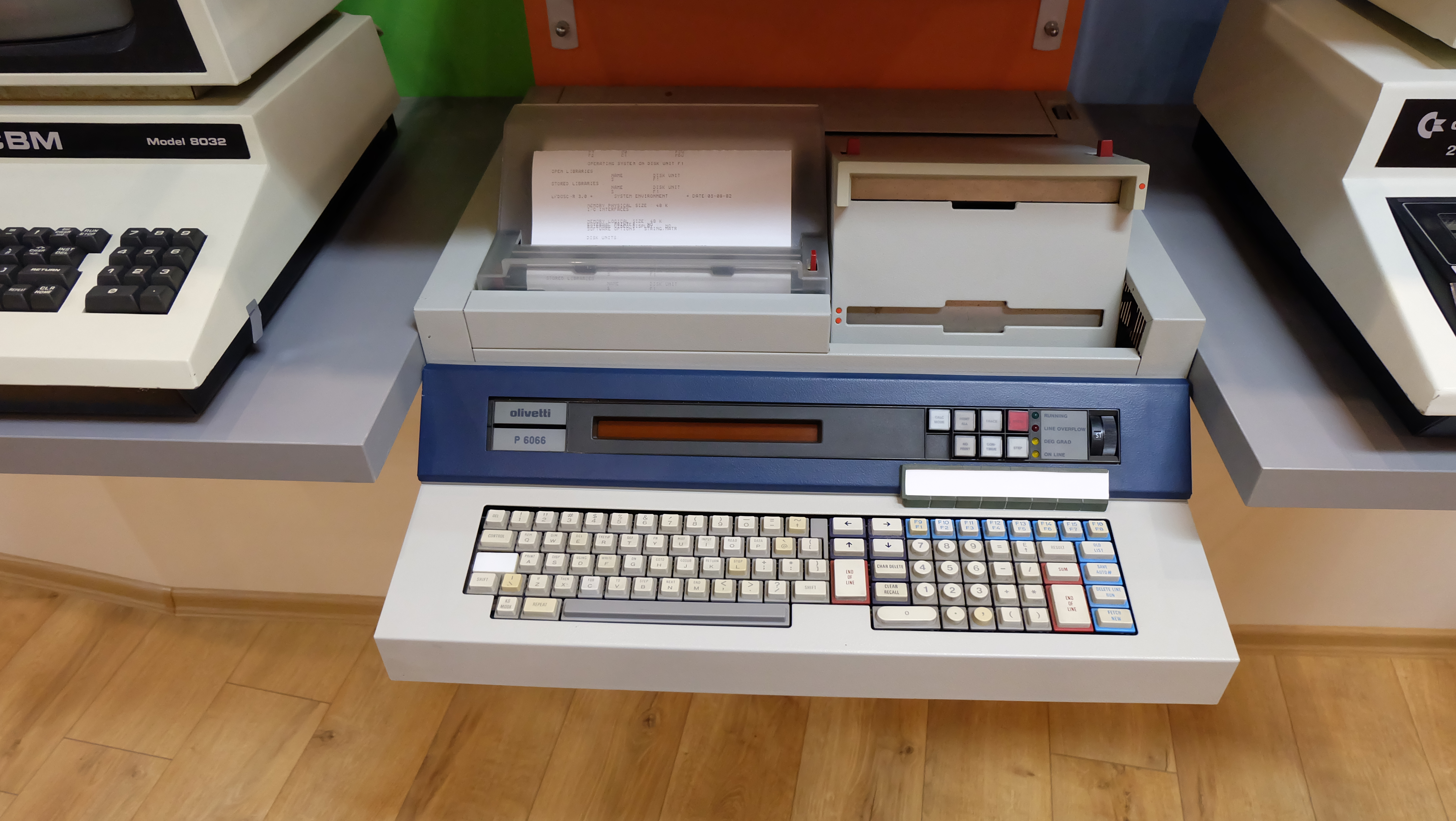

Olivetti P6066 was a personal computer programmable with a version of Basic owned by Olivetti and integrated in the operating system.

== Description ==
It was identical to Olivetti P6060 in the mechanical design; however, the color (white) and performances were different.

It was an improved version of the P6060, from which it was possible to make an upgrade.

Head of the development was Pier Giorgio Perotto, and the production site was Scarmagno.
