= Mario Tchou =

Italian engineer of Chinese descent (1924–1961)

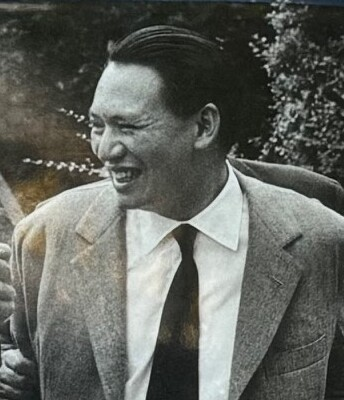
Image of Mario Tchou

Mario Tchou (simplified Chinese: 马里奥·朱; traditional Chinese: 馬里奧·朱; 1924–1961), also known as Tchou Wang Li, was an Italian engineer of Chinese descent. He was a pioneer of computer science in Italy, who led a group of scientists from the University of Pisa to invent in 1959 the Olivetti Elea—the world's most powerful computer at the time.

== Biography ==
Born in Rome on 26 June 1924, he was the son of Evelyn Wang and the diplomat Yin Tchou, who worked within the Consulate of the Republic of China at the Holy See.

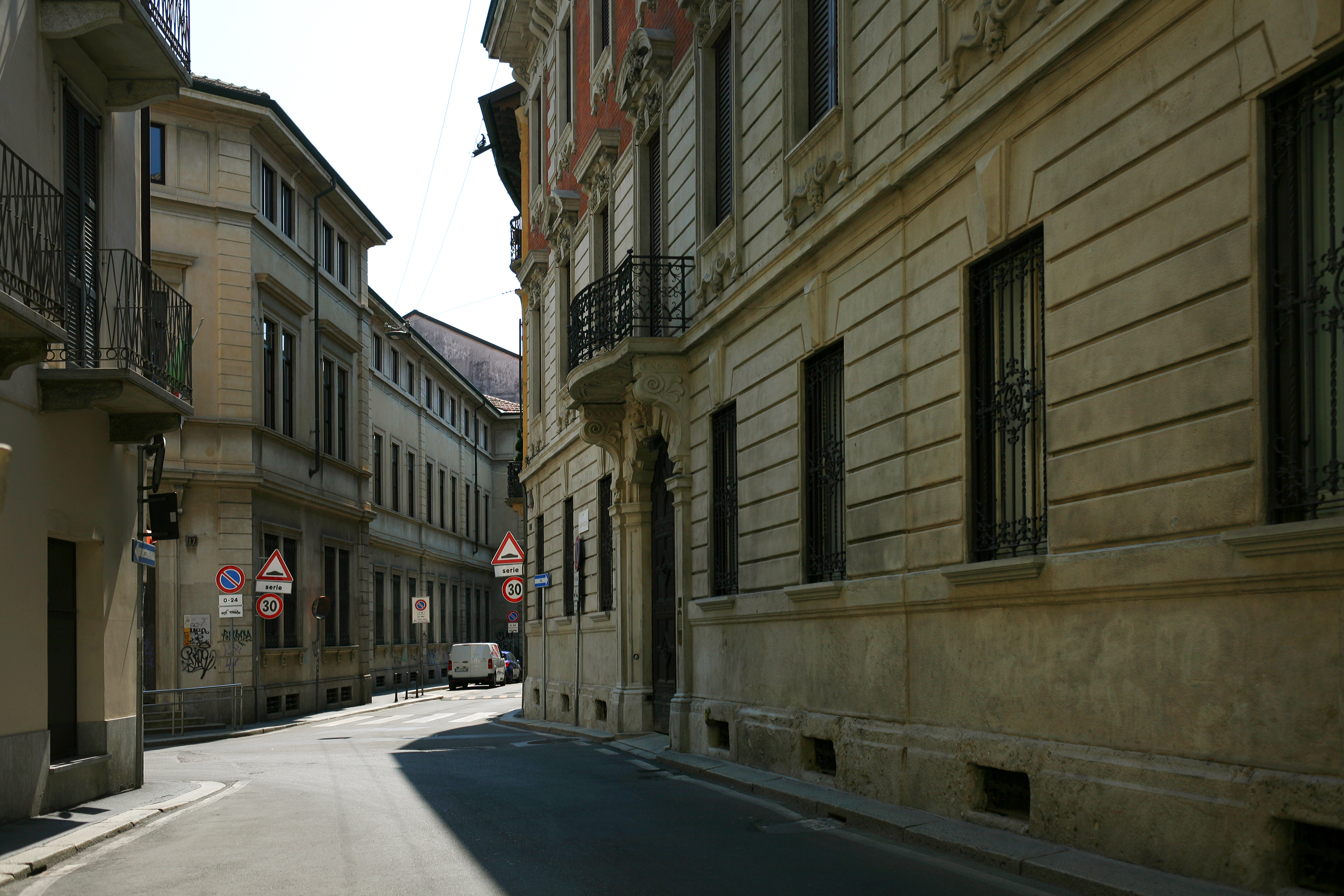
Via Cappuccio in Milan, where Tchou lived with his wife

After obtaining his classical high school diploma at the Torquato Tasso Gymnasium High School in Rome, he undertook his studies in electrical engineering in Rome, at the La Sapienza University, and continued them with a scholarship in the United States, where, in 1947, he obtained a Bachelor of electrical engineering at the Catholic University of America in Washington. He graduated from the New York University Polytechnic School of Engineering in 1949.

Having moved to New York, he began teaching at Manhattan College while, at the same time, he specialized at the Polytechnic University of New York in Brooklyn, where, in 1949, he obtained a Master of Science with a thesis entitled Ultrasonic Diffraction. In the same year he married the Italian Mariangela Siracusa. In 1952, at the age of 28, he was called to teach at Columbia University in New York, in the department led by John R. Ragazzini.

After the separation from his first wife, he married the artist Elisa Montessori in 1955, and they had two daughters.

=== Olivetti Elea project ===
Given his knowledge of electronics, in 1955 Adriano Olivetti hired him into the company and entrusted him with the task of forming a working group which, in collaboration with the University of Pisa, had the aim of designing and building an all Italian electronic calculator, at the suggestion of Enrico Fermi, using the 150 million lire already allocated (for a synchrotron later built in Frascati) for the Pisan Electronic Calculator with valves and transistors. In the same year he separated from his first wife and remarried the painter Elisa Montessori, with whom he had two daughters. He later began working on the largest Olivetti Elea, the greatest transistor supercomputer of the time, later built in 40 examples.

=== Industrial vision ===
Mario Tchou's activity was based on a vision that focused on high innovation. In the laboratory of Barbaricina (a district of the city of Pisa) he gathered the best brains, all young: "Because new things are only done with young people. Only young people throw themselves into it with enthusiasm, and collaborate in harmony without personalism and without the obstacles deriving from a customary mentality." He considered Italy "at the same level as the most advanced countries in the field of electronic calculating machines from a qualitative point of view. The others, however, receive enormous help from the state. The United States allocates huge sums for electronic research, especially for military purposes. Britain also spends millions of pounds. Olivetti's effort is relatively notable, but the others have a more secure future than ours, being helped by the State"

=== Last years ===
The young engineer personally tried to get closer to Ivrea, the historic headquarters of Olivetti, to break down the wall of distrust that the employees of the mechanical sector had towards the newly formed electronics division, but his attempts were in vain: the mechanical and electronic sectors remained divided, like their respective headquarters, one in Ivrea, the other in Borgolombardo, a hamlet of San Giuliano Milanese, where the Barbaricina group moved in 1960. The engineer was placed in charge of the newly established Electronic Research Laboratory (LRE).

Mario Tchou died together with his driver Francesco Frinzi (1933–1961) in a tragic car accident on the morning of 9 November 1961, at just 37 years old, on the Milan-Turin motorway overpass, just before the Santhià toll booth; the driver lost control of the car after overtaking and crashed into a van. That morning Tchou was traveling to Ivrea to discuss the design of a new transistor architecture.

The sudden death of Tchou, a year after that of Adriano Olivetti, decreed the end of the Elea project and closed an important season for Italian electronics, which at the time saw the industrial and technological leadership of Olivetti. The electronics division was decommissioned and sold to General Electric in 1964.
