= Olivetti P6060 =

Personal computer

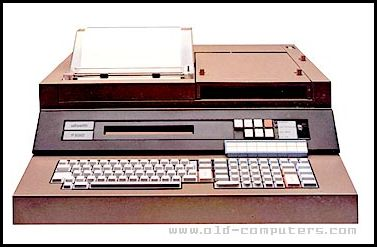
- The Olivetti P6060 Personal Computer
- Manufacturer: Olivetti
- Type: Personal Computer
- Released: April 1975; 51 years ago
- Introductory price: $7,950 (8KB RAM, single FDD), $10,000 (16KB RAM, dual FDD)
- Operating system: BASIC
- CPU: TTL based
- Memory: 8KB to 16KB RAM, 32KB to 64KB ROM
- Storage: one or two 8" floppy disk drives, 256KB capacity
- Display: 32 characters alphanumerical orange plasma display, optional graphics capable DSM 6660 video unit
- Input: Keyboard
- Connectivity: RS-232, IEEE-488
- Power: "ALI200" switching source 200W
- Dimensions: 60 cm x 60 cm wide and 25 cm high
- Weight: 40 kg (88 lb)
- Predecessor: Olivetti P6040
- Successor: Olivetti P6066

The Olivetti P6060 was the first personal computer with a built-in floppy disk. It was presented in April 1975 by the Italian manufacturer Olivetti at the Hannover fair, alongside the smaller P6040 that stored data on proprietary 2.5-inch mylar floppies called Minidisk (3 KB).

== Description ==
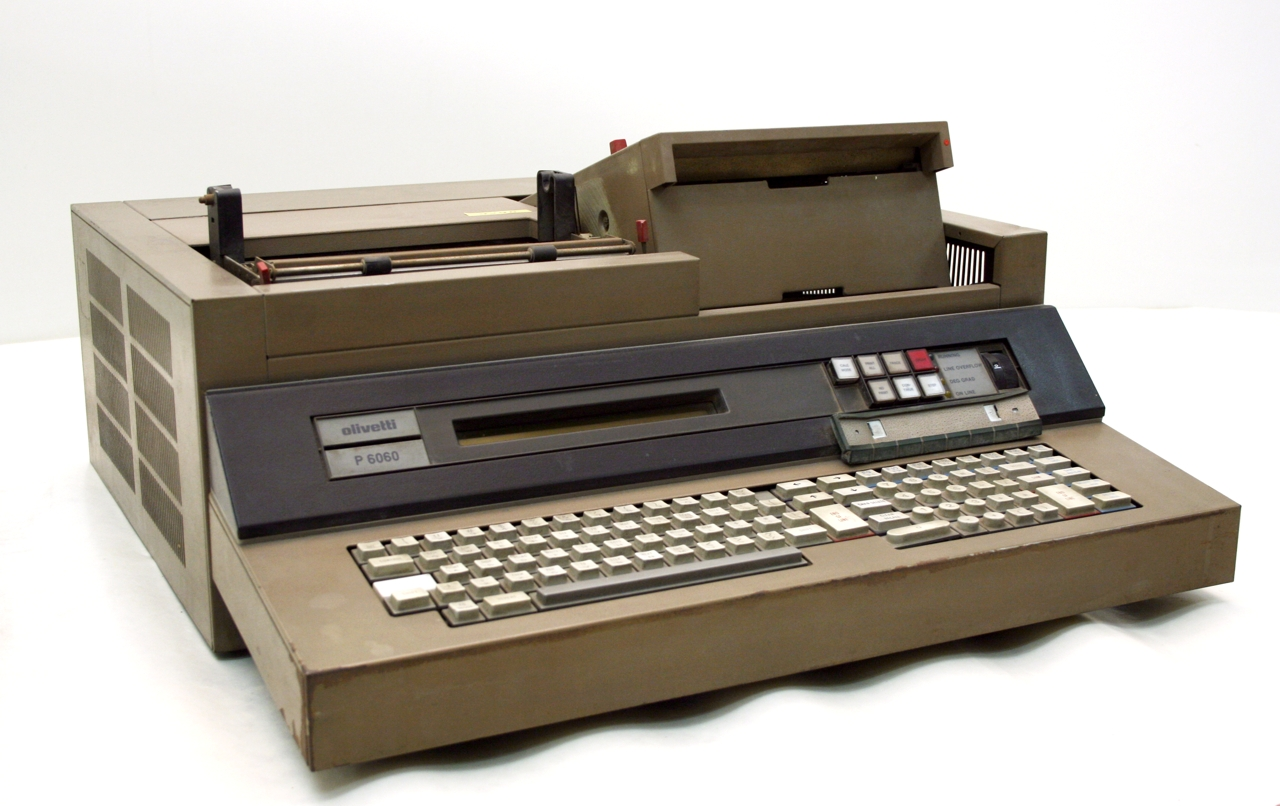
Olivetti P6066 exhibited at Museo Nazionale della Scienza e della Tecnologia "Leonardo da Vinci", Milan.

The engineering team that devised the P6060 wanted to enclose into the machine everything the user would need, by integrating not only the printer but also the floppy drive. Thus it became the first Personal Computer to have this unit built into its interior. Its central processing unit was on two cards, code named PUCE1 and PUCE2, with TTL components. It had an 80-column graphical thermal printer, 48 Kbytes of RAM, and BASIC language. It was in competition with a similar product by IBM that had an external floppy disk drive.

The assembly line was located in the Olivetti factories of Scarmagno, some modules forming subsets of the machine as a printer or floppy disks were manufactured at plants in San Bernardo d'Ivrea.
