= Fullerenes, Nanotubes and Carbon Nanostructures =

Scientific journal

- Discipline: Carbon science, materials science
- Language: English
- Edited by: Franco Cataldo

Publication details
- Former names: Fullerene Science and Technology (1993—2002)
- History: 1993—present
- Publisher: Taylor & Francis
- Frequency: Monthly
- Impact factor: 1.8 (2024)

Standard abbreviations
- ISO 4: Fullerenes, Nanotubes Carbon Nanostruct.

Indexing
- CODEN: FNCNAR
- ISSN: 1536-383X

Links
- Journal homepage; Online access; Online archive

Fullerenes, Nanotubes and Carbon Nanostructures is a peer-reviewed scientific journal published monthly by Taylor & Francis. It covers research in carbon science, including but not limited to fullerenes, carbon nanotubes, nanodiamonds and graphene. Its current editor-in-chief is Franco Cataldo (Actinium Chemical Research Institute). It was established in 1993 under the title Fullerene Science and Technology, before being named to its current title in 2002.

== Abstracting and indexing ==
The journal is abstracted and indexed in:

- Chemical Abstracts Core
- Current Contents/Physical, Chemical & Earth Sciences
- EBSCO databases
- Ei Compendex
- Inspec
- Science Citation Index Expanded
- Scopus

According to the Journal Citation Reports, the journal has a 2024 impact factor of 1.8.
