= Cappellaro =

Cappellaro is an Italian surname. Notable people with the surname include:

- Paola Cappellaro, Italian-American engineer who is a Professor of Nuclear Science and Engineering at the Massachusetts Institute of Technology
- Susanna Cappellaro, Italian actress and writer living in Soho, London

== See also ==
- Capellaro
