= Capellaro =

Capellaro is an Italian surname. Notable people with the surname include:

- Natale Capellaro (1902–1977), Italian mechanical designer of mechanical calculators and honoris causa engineer
- Vittorio Capellaro (1877–1943), Brazilian film director, film producer, film actor, and screenwriter

== See also ==
- Cappellaro
