= Olivetti typewriters =

Italian manufacturer

Olivetti is an Italian manufacturer of computers, tablets, smartphones, printers, calculators, and fax machines. It was founded as a typewriter manufacturer by Camillo Olivetti in 1908 in the Turin commune of Ivrea, Italy.

By 1994, Olivetti stopped production of typewriters, as more and more users were transitioning to personal computers.

== Mechanical models ==
=== M1 (1911) ===
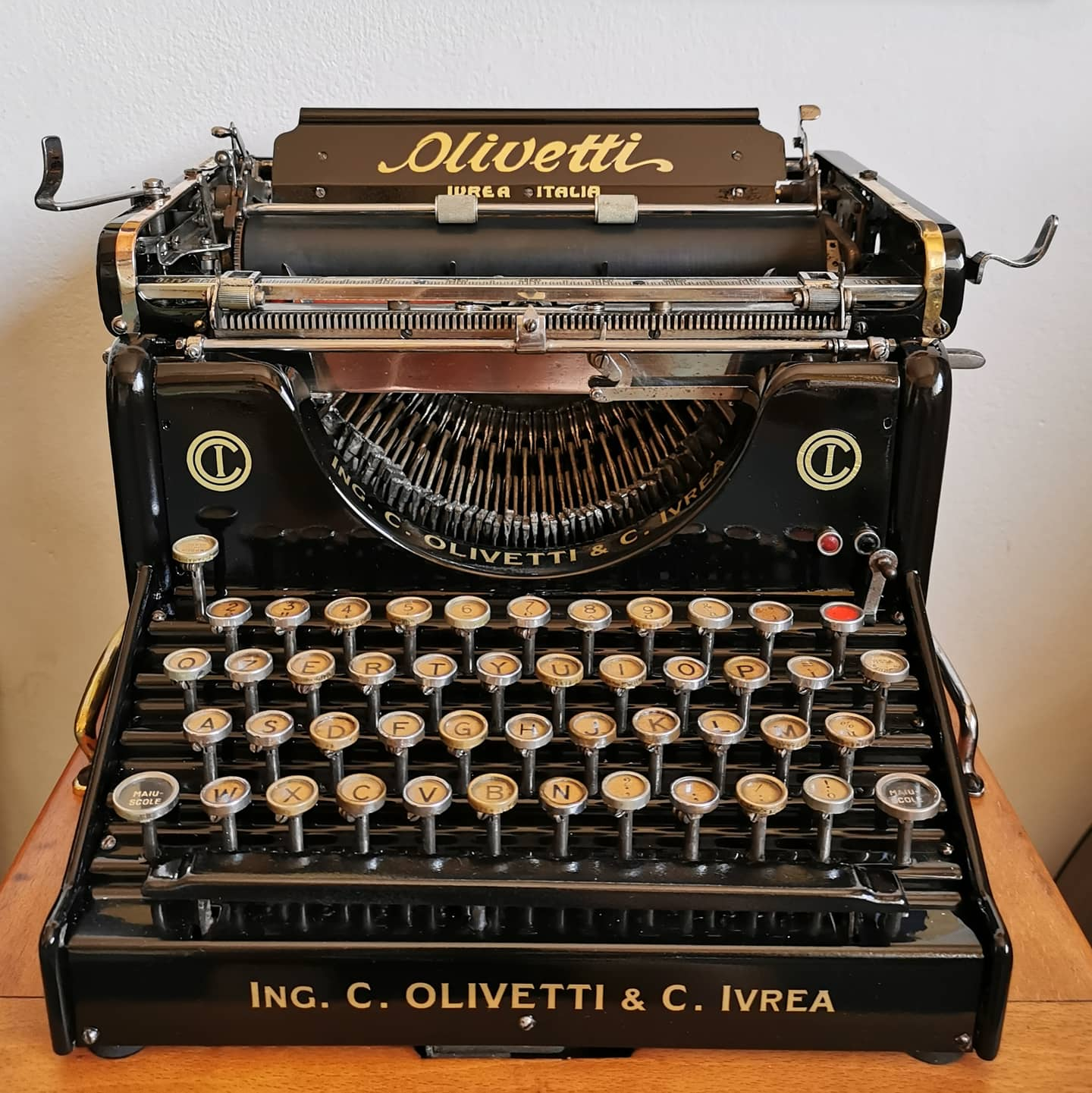
The M1, the first Olivetti typewriter

Until the mid-1960s, the Olivetti typewriters were fully mechanical. Introduced at the World's Fair in Turin in 1911, the first Olivetti typewriter, the M1, was made of about 3000 hand made parts and weighed 17 kg. It was the first Italian typewriter and had a keyboard of 42 keys corresponding to 84 signs, 33-cm paper roll allowing for 110 characters and featured two-colored ribbon, automatic reverse direction, and return key. Heavy and massive, it was intended for professional use in offices.

=== M20 (1920) ===
In 1920 the M1 was replaced by a new model, the M20. It featured several innovations, including the trolley running on a fixed guideway. Unlike the M1, which was sold in Italy, the M20 was exported to many European and non-European markets.

=== M40 (1930) ===
To update the M20, Olivetti worked on a new model which came out in 1930 and remained in production until 1948, the M40. A second version came out in 1937 and another one in the 1940s. Customers particularly appreciated the fixed-guide carriage, the lightness of touch of the keyboard and the speed of writing.

=== MP1 (1932) ===
In 1932, Olivetti presented a portable typewriter shortly after the launch of the M40: the MP1 (Modello Portatile in Italian). Conceived by Gino Martinoli and Adriano Olivetti, engineered by Riccardo Levi, and designed by Aldo and Adriano Magnelli, it was intended for both office and domestic use. It weighed only 5.2 kilos, as compared to the M1, which weighed 17 kilos, measured 11.7 centimetres high, half the height of the M1. The mechanism was partly concealed by the body, and the monumental vertical structure of the M1 had been flattened and lightened. In addition to the black colour of the M1 and M20, the MP1 was offered in red, blue, light blue, brown, green, grey, and ivory.

=== Studio 42 (1935) ===
Also known as the M2, it was designed in 1935 by Luigi Figini and Gino Pollini, Ottavio Luzzati and Xanti Schawinsky. It is characterized by the various colors available: in addition to the classic black, it was also available in red, gray, brown and light blue.

The keyboard is the QZERTY type, as is usual for Italian machines (apart from modern computer keyboards). In addition to the writing keys, the keyboard includes a space bar, two shift keys, a shift lock, a return key, and a tab key.

The set of writing keys has an obvious lack: there is no key with the number 1, which is obtained by using the lowercase letter l (L) or the capital I (i); likewise, there is no zero, which is obtained by typing the capital O (o). Although this may seem strange today, it was quite common in the old typewriters.

There is also a portable version, with the machine fixed on a wooden base with black imitation leather and a removable protection also covered in wood, a black leather carrying handle and a chrome lock.

=== Lexikon 80 (1948) ===
The M80, or the Lexikon 80 was designed by Marcello Nizzoli in 1948. It has been a huge success for Olivetti and Hispano-Olivetti, and it became the most sold typewriter in the world. It has a unique style in color, shape, and structural strength.

This machine was first published as M80, featuring a keyboard with round keys that had a thin metal outline to the circumference, appealing notoriously to many older models, like the M40. Despite the M80 series being a standard machine, it only came in the short 10" carriage, that fulfilled common purposes, just like a portable machine.

The M80 was later renamed the Lexikon 80. The model was produced in three series, initially in beige, with light-blue versions introduced later.

The Lexikon 80 had a few changes in contrast to its previous version M80; it had keys fully made out of plastic, it was slightly bigger in size, it startedmost featuring decimal tabulators, and it had a wide variety of dismountable carriages. While dismountable carriages are featured in most standard typewriters, -mostly removable with a pair of screws, or the pull of two latches for very easy access like the Olympia-Werke SG1- the M80 had its carriage completely welded to the chassis, and could only be removed with a special key that was only given to authorised servicemen.

Dismountable carriages vary in size, anywhere from 9 or 10 inches up to 30 inches. While they're not actually meant to be dismounted and replaced in the first place, dismountable carriages are just an easy shortcut for servicemen to access the insides of the machine and, if necessary, replace the carriage. A machine must not get its carriage replaced with another one with a different length. Carriages that went over 25 inches required the typewriter body to have supports on each size to prevent the machine from tipping over when the carriage is moved to one extreme or another.

=== Lettera 22 (1950) ===
The Olivetti Lettera 22 [oliˈvetti ˈlɛttera ˌventiˈduːe] is a portable mechanical typewriter based on a technical project by Giuseppe Beccio, Olivetti's Technical Director, with industrial design by Marcello Nizzoli in 1949 or, according to the company's current owner Telecom Italia, 1950. This typewriter was very popular in Italy, and it still has many fans. It was awarded the Compasso d'Oro prize in 1954. In 1959 the Illinois Institute of Technology chose the Lettera 22 as the best design product of the previous 100 years.

The typewriter is sized about 27x37x8 cm (with the carriage return lever adding about 1–2 more centimeters in height), making it quite portable at least for the time's standards, even though its 3.7 kg (8.2 lb) weight may limit portability somewhat.

Various view of the Lettra 22
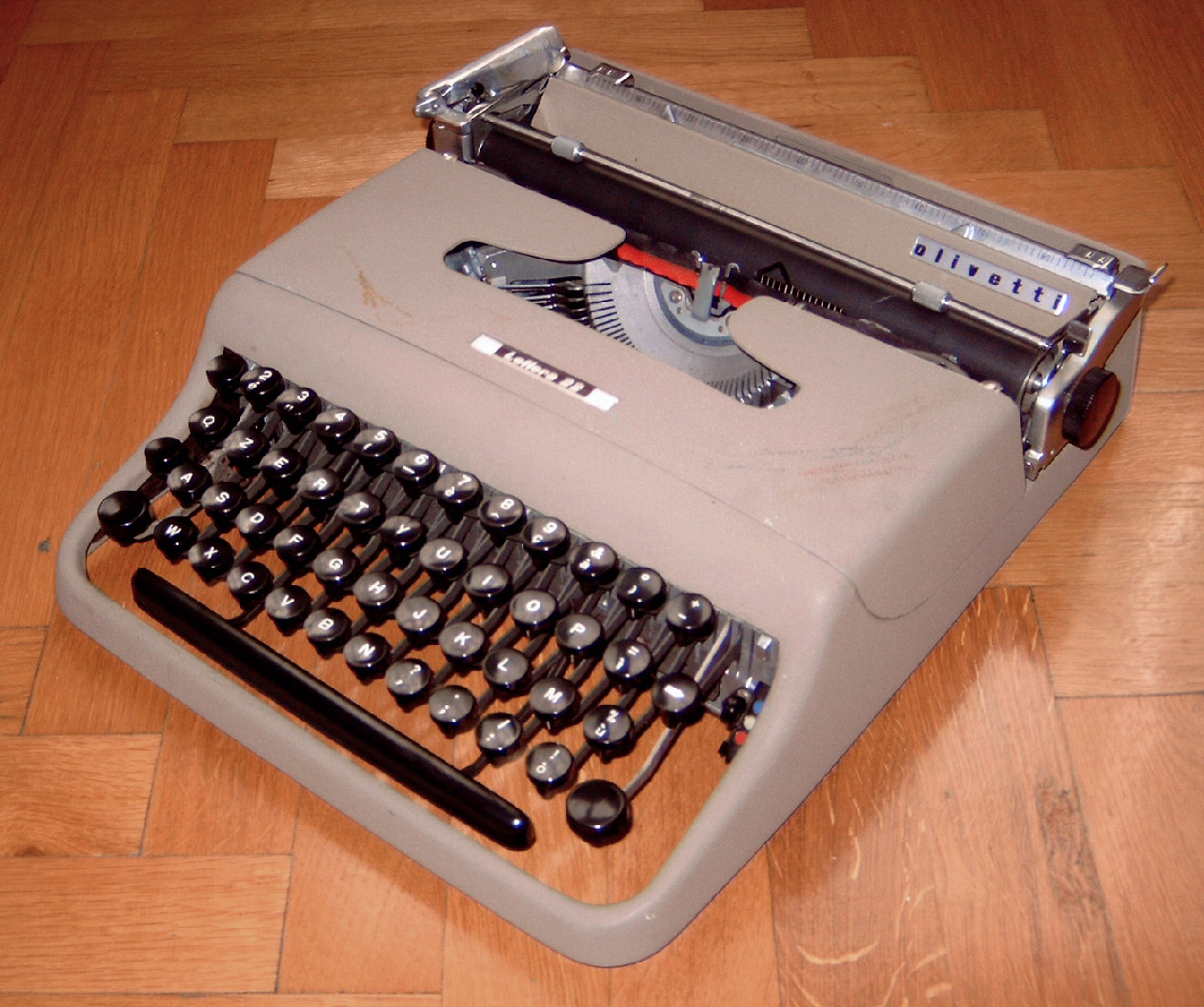

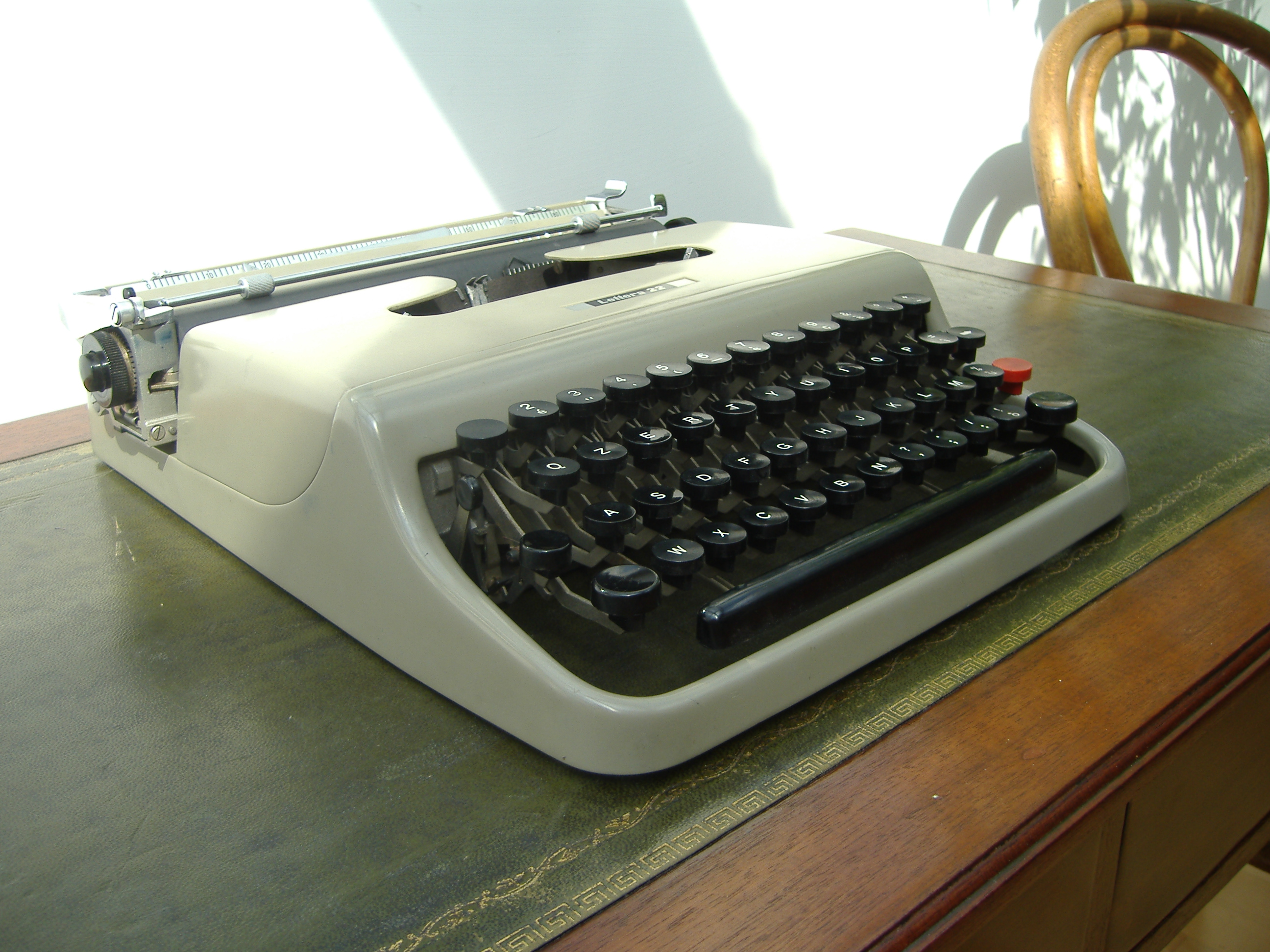

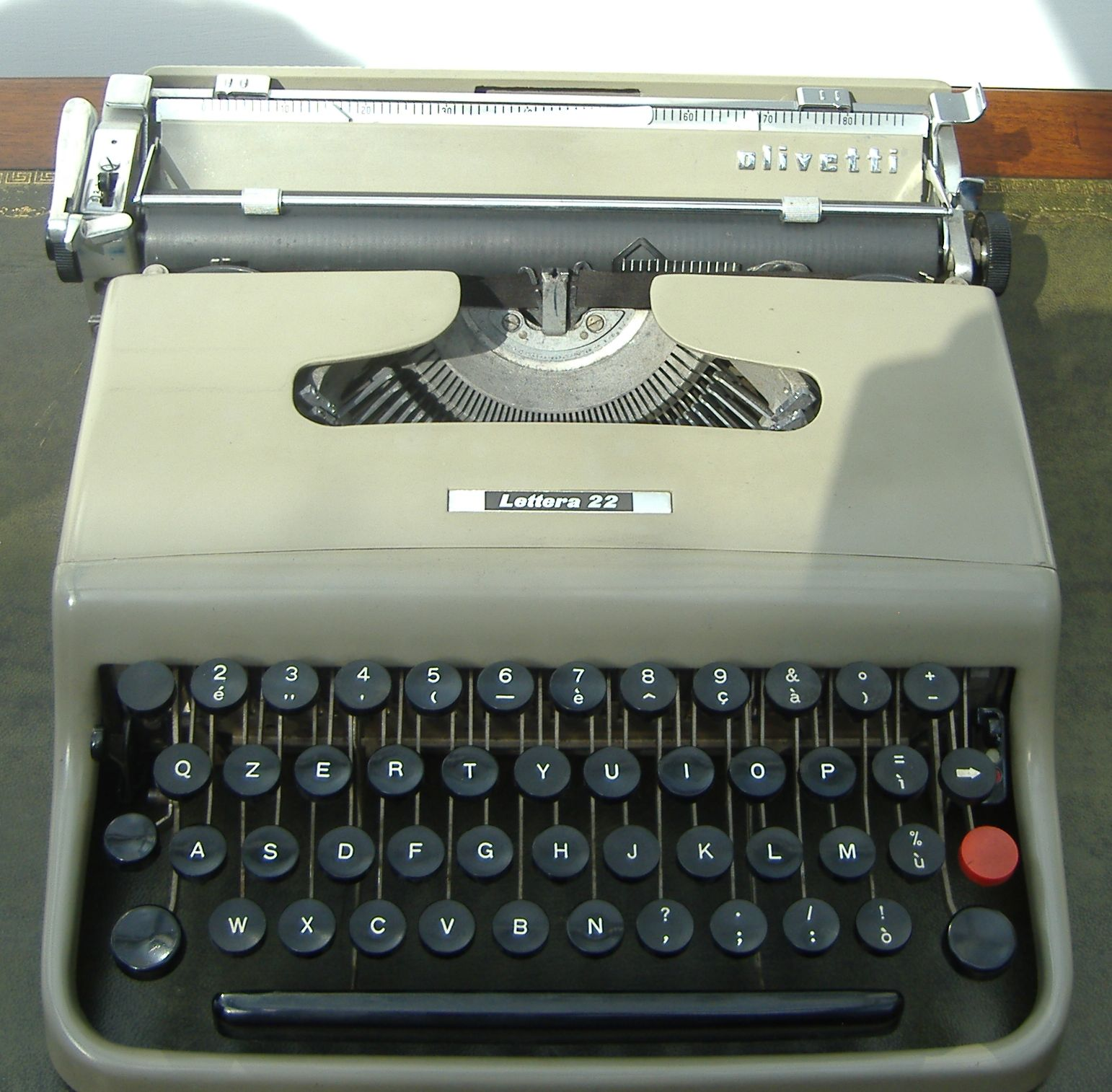

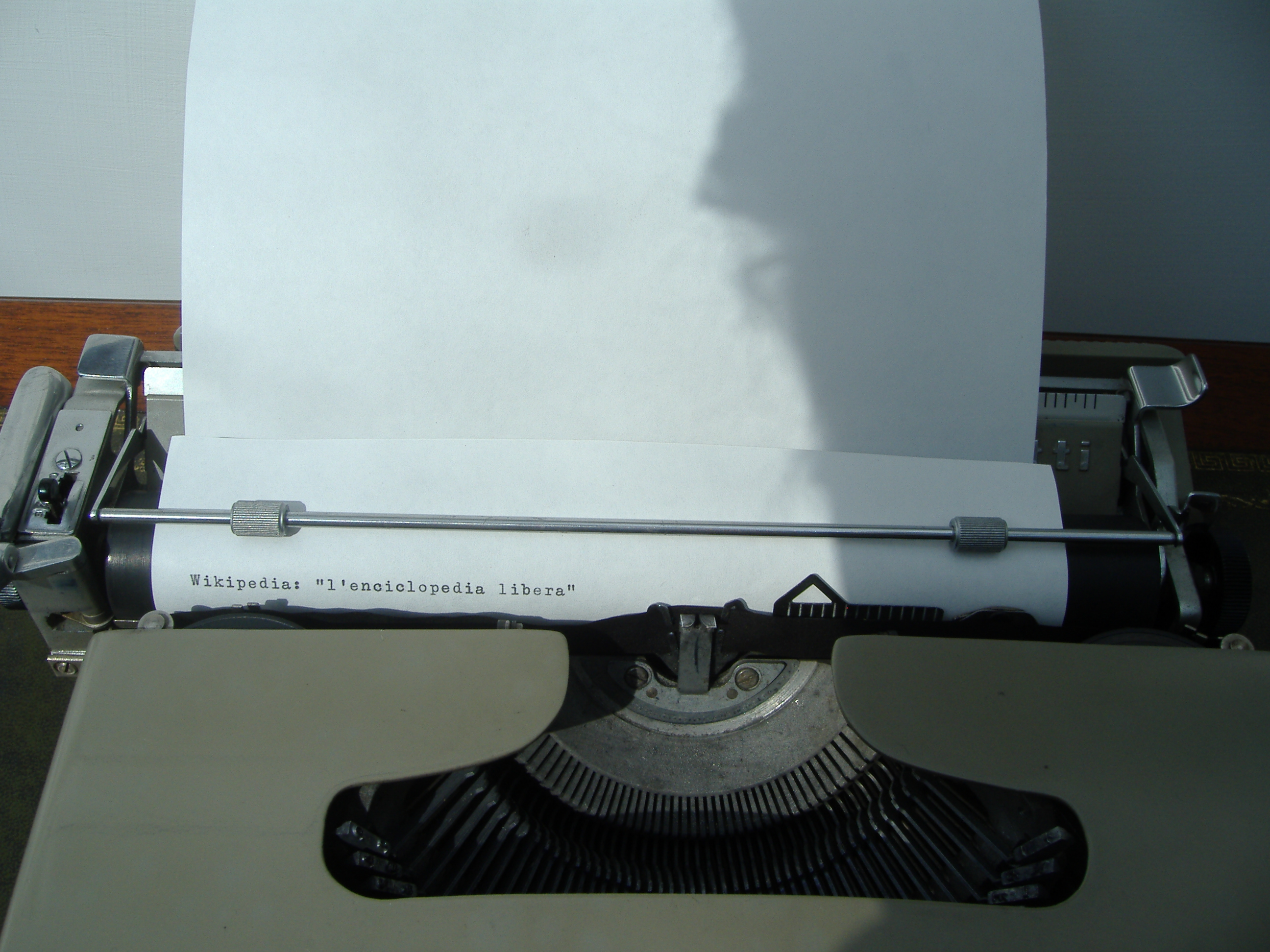

The model was eventually succeeded by the Olivetti Lettera 32.

=== Lettera 32 (1963) ===
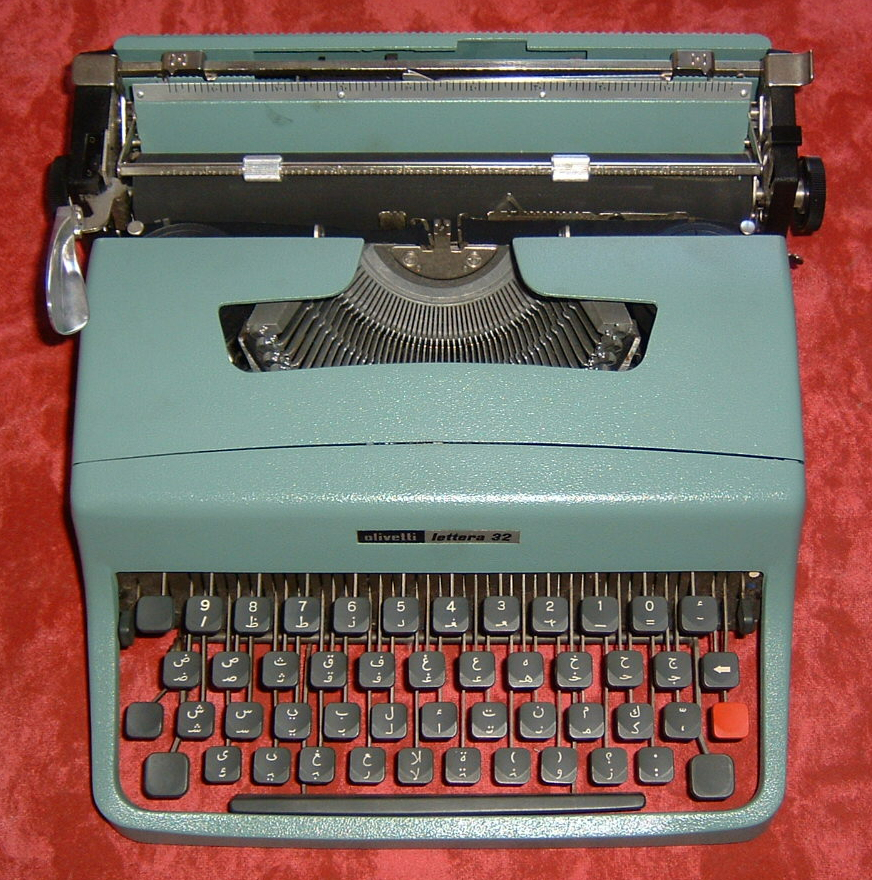
A Lettera 32 with Arabic keyboard

The Olivetti Lettera 32 is a portable mechanical typewriter designed by Marcello Nizzoli (with Adriano Menicanti and Natale Capellaro) in 1963 as the successor of the popular Olivetti Lettera 22. The Lettera 32 was also very popular amongst writers, journalists and students.

The typewriter is sized about 34x35x10 cm (with the carriage return lever adding about 1–2 centimeters in height), making it portable at least for the time's standards, even though its 5.9 kg weight may limit portability somewhat.

The Lettera 32 did not come with a manual but with an instruction card.

==== Mechanics ====
The Lettera 32 is a downstrike typebar typewriter. The typebars strike a red/black inked ribbon, which is positioned between the typebar and the paper by a lever whenever a key is pressed; a small switch located near the upper right side of the keyboard can be used to control the strike position of the ribbon, in order to print with black, red, or no ink (for mimeograph stencils).

Ribbon movement, which also occurs at every keypress, automatically reverses direction when there is no ribbon left on the feed reel; two mechanical sensors, situated next to each wheel, move when the ribbon is put under tension (indicating ribbon end), attaching the appropriate wheel to the ribbon transport mechanism and detaching the other.

Its mechanical components were used as the basis for the Valentine model.

==== Keyboard ====
The keyboard uses QWERTY, AZERTY and various other layouts. Apart from the typing keys, the keyboard includes a space bar, two shift keys, a caps lock, a backspace key, margin release key, paragraph indentation key and a tab-stop set/unset key.

As was common in older typewriters, it lacks the number 1(but the Olivetti Lettera 10 has it), which is supposed to be substituted by the lowercase l.

==== Popular culture ====
Cormac McCarthy used an Olivetti Lettera 32 to write nearly all of his fiction, screenplays, and correspondence, totalling by his estimate more than 5 million words. The Lettera 32 that he purchased in 1963 was auctioned at Christie's on December 4, 2009, to an unidentified American collector for $254,500, more than 10 times its high estimate of $20,000. McCarthy paid $11 for a replacement typewriter of the same model, but in newer condition.

Francis Ford Coppola used an Olivetti Lettera 32 to write the screenplay for the 1972 motion picture The Godfather, which he also directed.

==== Subsequent models ====
From then on, the technology of the hand-held portables tends to stabilize. The mechanics of the Lettera 32 is therefore maintained at the base of the subsequent models: the Olivetti Dora and Lettera De Luxe (1965), Lettera 25 and 35 (1974), Lettera 10 and 12 (1979) and 40/41/42 and 50/51/52 (1980) differ mainly in design.

=== Lettera DL (1965) ===
The Lettera DL shares its internal mechanism with the Lettera 32. The Lettera 33 and PMC Elite 44 are both rebrands of the Lettera DL and are essentially the same machine.

=== Lettera 35 (1972) ===
Lettera 35 model

The Olivetti Lettera 35 is a portable mechanical typewriter created in 1972 by Mario Bellini and released to the public in 1974.

More than 10 years after the Lettera 32, Olivetti felt the need to renew the design of its portable typewriters. Thus, the Lettera 35 was launched. Unlike the Lettera 22 and 32, which maintain a simple and essential style, the Lettera 35 features a robust design to create the image of a professional machine that recalls the future Lettera 36, an electric typewriter released in 1970.

==== Mechanics ====
With the same mechanics as the Lettera 32, the Olivetti Lettera 35 is a typewriter with pressure writing levers. Each time a key is pressed, the corresponding hammer, through the kinematic mechanism, goes to beat on the tape with red or black ink, behind which is the sheet of paper on which is thus imprinted the corresponding symbol.

A lever located at the top right of the keyboard can be used to control the position of the ribbon and select printing in black, red or without ink (in case of copies with carbon paper or for the preparation of ink matrices for the mimeograph). The ribbon winds with each key press and automatically changes winding direction when it is finished in one of the two spools in which it is wound. Two mechanical sensors located near each spool move when the ribbon stretches (this indicates that it is finishing) and reverse its winding direction.

==== Keyboard ====
The original Italian version used the QZERTY keyboard, although versions with different key arrangements were produced which corresponded with other languages.

The alphanumeric keys totaled 43 of the 86 total keys. Other than this, the keyboard had a space bar, two keys to set uppercase letters, a caps lock key, a lever to for the ability to go beyond the set margins, a key for backspacing, a lever to switch tabs, and a (red) key to switch between tabs.

The set of characters available has obvious shortcomings: there is no key with the number 1, which is obtained by using the lowercase letter l (L) or the capital I (i); there are no keys for the accented uppercase vowels used in the Italian language, which were replaced by normal letters followed by the apostrophe. This type of solution was quite common in the typewriters of the time.

=== Valentine (1969) ===
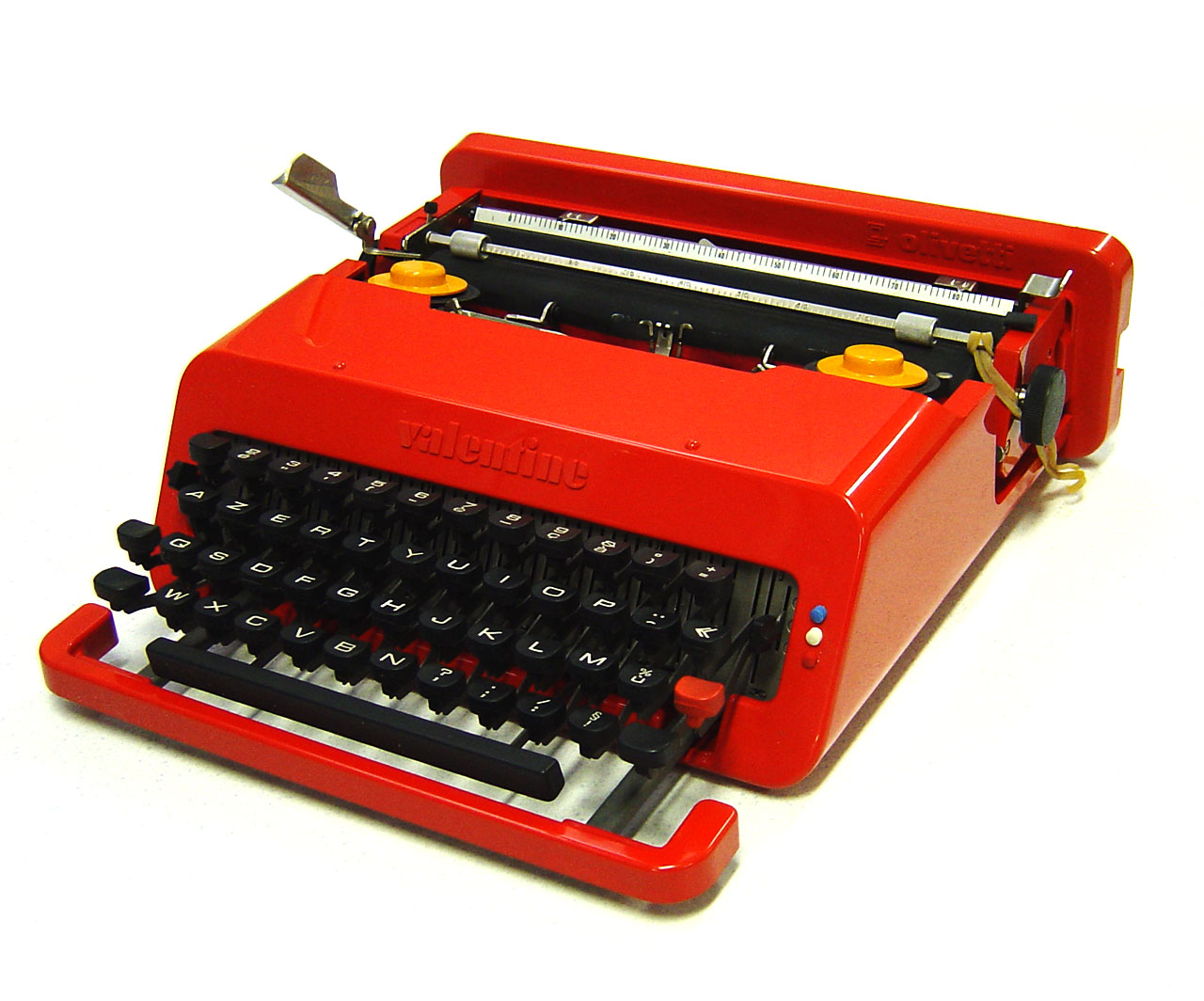
The Olivetti Valentine designed by Ettore Sottsass (with Perry A. King and Albert Leclerc)

The Olivetti Valetine is a portable, manual typewriter noted for its typically red ABS plastic bodywork and matching red case. Its mechanical components are derived from the Lettera 32. Despite being an expensive, functionally limited and somewhat technically mediocre product which failed to find success in the marketplace, the Valentine ultimately became a celebrated icon — largely on account of its expressive design and practicality.

The fame of the design was such that late in his career, the designer Ettore Sottsass would lament "I worked sixty years of my life, and it seems the only thing I did is this fucking red machine."

The Valentine is featured in the Metropolitan Museum, Museum of Modern Art, Cooper Hewitt, Smithsonian Design Museum, London's Design Museum as well as the Victoria and Albert Museum.

In 2016, David Bowie's Valentine typewriter sold at auction by Sotheby's in London for £45,000 (US$57,000).

== Electromechanical models ==
The Editor series was used for speed typing championship competition. The Editor 5 from 1969 was the top model of that series, with proportional spacing and the ability to support justified text borders. In 1972 the electromechanical typeball machines of the Lexicon 90 to 94C series were introduced, as competitors to the IBM Selectric typewriters, the top model 94c supported proportional spacing and justified text borders like the Editor 5, as well as lift-off correction.

=== Praxis 48 (1964) ===
Based on Tekne 1 but radically changed design from Ettore Sottsass.

=== Tekne 1 (1962) ===
The Tekne and later Editor series introduced Olivett's own solution to drive the type lever. While other manufactures based their drive on a rotating roller, rubber coated or with teeth, Olivetti designed an up and down swinging flag drive which pulls the type lever towards the paper roller. So the movement of the type lever was under full control and made possible to implement a double strike protection based on inertia of the type lever and the force driven by the swinging flag to protect the types from damage when the typist unintentionally hits two or more keys at once. Tekne 1 was the base model of the series.

=== Editor 2 ===
Renamed model from Tekne 2.

=== Editor 3 ===
Initially renamed version of Tekne 3, later production derives from simplified Editor 4. Both versions, old flat and later higher version of Editor 3 were used as alphanumeric printer in Olivetti's computer P203.

=== Editor 4 ===
The Editor 4 alternatively was available with textile or carbon ribbon. A special version of it was the Editor 4ST which was used by Olivetti as an alphanumeric printer for some of their first personal computers like P506 and P652. The typewriter was controlled by the computer by additional electromechanical components at the keyboard levers at the bottom of the machine.

=== Editor 5 (1969) ===
The E5 was the top model of the Editor series. Based on the E4 it has carbon ribbon, proportional spacing and block aligned text support. The combination of proportional spacing and block aligned text is a challenge for the typist as he/she has to write every line two times, first time without printing, while a mechanical display counts the words in the line, and in the second pass it displays to the typist how many spaces with 2 or 3 elementary steps he still has to fill in the line to get a perfect result. To type spaces with 2 or 3 elementary steps the space bar is divided into two halves.

=== Lexikon 90 (1972) ===
The Lexikon 9x series was Olivetti's quite successful attempt to follow IBM's Selectric series to have exchangeable fonts on typeball. To avoid IBM's patents Olivetti made everything different, so the typeball does not rotate horizontally, but vertically, it has no moving print head, but instead the paper wagon was moving what also made possible to take over some mechanics of the Editor series. The mechanics to control the typeball was not controlled by wire ropes which made the Selectrix hard to adjust to work reliable but on turnable axles which made the Lexikon series very reliable and robust. The national keyboard layouts and typeballs were customizeable over a mechanical 'ROM' based on metal flags inside the keyboards where in production or maintenance single teeth could be broken out to change the layout according to tables in the service manual. The degrees to rotate the typeball was depending on this coding, using levers with moving turnpoint when pressing a key. The Lexikon 90 was the base model of the series.

=== Lexikon 92 (1972) ===
This is upgraded version of Lexikon 90 providing to choose different pitches.

=== Lexikon 93c (1972) ===
Upgraded version of Lexikon 92 having additional correction ribbon, so with this model already written text could be deleted half manually by press a delete key which backspaces the paper wagon and then the typist has to press the character he wants to delete. The machine instead of lifting the black ribbon it lifts the correction tape to cover up or lift off the character on the paper.

=== Lexikon 94c (1972) ===
This was the top model of the series providing proportional spacing and block aligned text similar to the Editor 5.

=== Lettera 36 (1974) ===
Portable compact electric type lever machine, produced in GDR for Olivetti. The Lettera 36 had a bad reputation as its mechanics was quite unreliable, but because of its affordable price it was quite successful. There were two different keyboard designs.

=== Lexikon 82 (1976) ===
Portable compact electrical typeball machine, successor of Lettera 36, implementing the IBM selectric 'golfball' mechanism, after its patent ended.

== Electronic and office models ==
In 1978 Olivetti was one of the first manufacturers to introduce electronic daisywheel printer-based word processing machines, called TES 401 and TES 501. Later the ET series typewriters without (or with) LCD and different levels of text editing capabilities were popular in offices. Models in that line were ET 121, ET 201, ET 221, ET 225, ET 231, ET 351, ET 109, ET 110, ET 111, ET 112, ET 115, ET 116, ET 2000, ET 2100, ET 2200, ET 2250, ET 2300, Et 2400 and ET 2500.

== Electronic and portable models ==
For home users in 1982 the Praxis 35, Praxis 40 and 45D were some of the first portable electronic typewriters. Later, Olivetti added the Praxis 20, ET Compact 50, ET Compact 60, ET Compact 70, ET Compact 65/66, the ET Personal series and Linea 101. The top models were 8 lines LCD based portables like Top 100 and Studio 801, with the possibility to save the text to a 3.5-inch floppy disk.

== Video typewriters ==
The professional line was upgraded with the ETV series video typewriters based on CP/M operating system, ETV 240, ETV 250, ETV 300, ETV 350 and later MS-DOS operating system based ETV 260, ETV 500, ETV 2700, ETV 2900, ETV 4000s word processing systems having floppy drives or hard disks. Some of them (ETV 300, 350, 500, 2900) were external boxes that could be connected through an optional serial interface to many of the ET series office typewriters, the others were fully integrated with an external monitor which could be installed on a holder over the desk. Most of the ET/ETV/Praxis series electronic typewriters were designed by Marion Bellini.

=== ETV 300 (1982) ===
The ETV 300 wordprocessor is a Zilog Z80 based box running on CP/M operating system. It was connected over serial interface to an ET 121 or ET 225 office typewriter which was used as the keyboard and daisywheel printer. The 5,25 inch single sided boot diskette starts directly in the MWP called wordprocessing software. Optionally it was available with a second floppy drive to store documents over there. Both floppy drives are 40 tracks 160 kB capacity. A rare version is the diskless ETV 300 which used to have the operating system and MWP in a ROM and storing the documents in battery buffered SRAM. The 80x25 characters green monochrome monitor with a diameter of 12 inch can stand on the ETV 300 box.

=== ETS 1010 (1982) ===
Based on a Syntrex word processing/data processing system.

=== ETV 350 (1984) ===
The ETV 350 is the successor of ETV 300. The box was a bit more compact and instead of one or two 5.25 inch drives it was using the more modern 3,5 inc single sided diskettes with 320 kB. Usually the ETV 350 was delivered with ET 111 or ET 115 as keyboard and printer.

=== ETS 2010 (1984) ===
Based on a Syntrex word processing/data processing system.

=== ETV 240 (1984) ===
The ETV 240 is a typewriter integrated design. On the base board it has two computers, a simpler one, based on NEC 7801 CPU to control the keyboaerd and the ET 115 office typewriter based daisywheel printer and a Z80 CPU based running CP/M 2.2 and the MWP wordprocessor software from ROM. The base configuration is diskless, storing all saved documents in battery buffered 32 kB RAM. This configuration can be enhanced by adding one 360 kB single sided 3.5 inch floppy drive supporting the same disk and document format as ETV 350. The 80x25 characters CRT 12 inch green monitor optionally can be mounted on a pivotable arm. Like ET 111 to 116 the print head has also optical sensor to detect type/pitch and nationality of the daisywheel.

=== ETV 250 (1984) ===
This is enhanced version of ETV 240. Instead of ROM based design the ETV 250 boots CP/M 2.2 and MWP wordprocessor from 3.5 floppy. Optionally the ETV 250 can have two floppy drives. For ETV 240 and 250 sprockets and automatic sheet feeder could be added. The ETV 250 could be enhanced with serial interface cardridges to support serial interface, external 5,25 floppy drive for data exchange with some ET series typewriters and ETV 300. There was a special serial interface to run the ETV 250 on the Teletex network as a sender and receiver of messages, similar to teletype, this was the so-called ETV 250TTX. Like on ETV 300 the wordprocessor was exitable to run standard CP/M software on this video typewriter.

=== ETV 260 (1986) ===
This video typewriter is based on Olivetti M19 mainboard and ET 116 office typewriter daisywheel printer. As it has Intel 8088 CPU at 8 MHz (M19 is only 4.77 MHz), 640 kB RAM and CGA graphics it runs MS-DOS and its applications. The word processing software SWP is based on Olivetti branded MS-DOS 3.20. SWP supports to include tables which also could be used to print simple line based graphics in a document. Computer and printer are integrated in one box, like on ETV 240/250 the monitor can be installed on an arm and the keyboard is similar to IBM's XT layout. As mass storage it is uses two 3.5 inch 720 kB floppy drives or one floppy drive plus 20 MB hard disk. The daisy wheel printer is fully software driven by a config.sys driver running on the 8088 CPU and behaves like an external printer on LPT1:. The printer driver also contains a hotkey function which is running under any MS-DOS software to write directly on the printer like a normal typewriter, inclusive correction function. The print head has optical paper sensor to automatically detect the left margin of the paper and align printing on the paper, it is printing bidirectional at 35 cps which is quite fast for a daisy wheel printer. Like ET 111 to 116, the print head also has an optical sensor to detect type/pitch and nationality of the daisywheel. Optionally, there was a sprocket and automatic sheet feeder available. The SWP wordprocessor software is able to read MWP documents of ETV 350, 240, 250 and 210s from their proprietary CP/M-based disk format. Optionally, there was an external 360 kB 5.25 inch floppy drive called DU 260 to support diskettes of ETV 300 for document import.

=== ETV 500 (1986) ===
This was basically a rebadged Olivetti M19 personal computer. The difference is that the 8088 CPU runs at 8 instead of 4.77 MHz and instead of 5.25 inch floppy drives it uses 720 kB 3.5 inch. The client had the choice to use the same XT layout based keyboard as on ETV 260 or the keyboard of a serial connected ET 112 or ET 116 typewriter. Typically the connected typewriter was also used as the printer, or some of Olivetti's own dot-matrix or daisy wheel printers could be used.

=== ETV 210s (1987) ===
With its thermal transfer print head, based on IBM's quietwriter patents combined with the printer chassis of ET 116, the ETV 210s was announced as the future of the typewriter. The ETV 210s uses a Zilog Z80-compatible CPU from Hitachi, running CP/M and the word processor in ROM. The PC-style external keyboard is quite special as it contains an 80x5 character alphanumeric LCD to write the documents. Otherwise it is functionally similar to the ETV 240, supporting the same file format in battery-buffered SRAM or optionally on one 3.5 inch 720 kb floppy disk drive, which is also able to read disks from the ETV 240, 250 and 350.

=== ETV 2700 (1988) ===
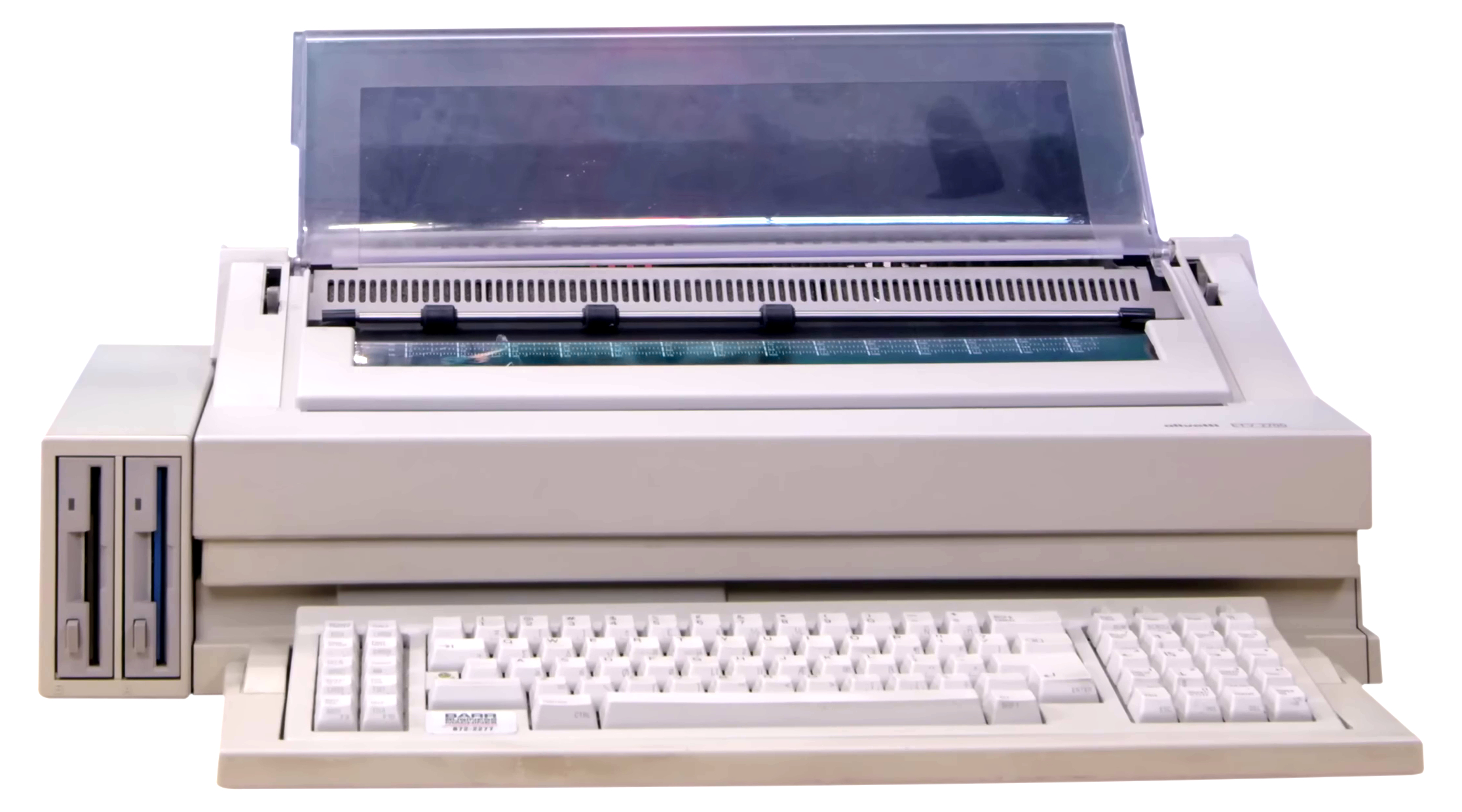
Olivetti ETV 2700

The ETV 2700 is the low cost successor of ETV 260, based on the ET 2000 series printer mechanics. The machine is a fully integrated, NEC V40-based PC, with the electronics to control the printer on one small footprint mainboard. Even the keyboard is directly attached to the machine. The system runs MS-DOS and the SWP word processor software which is document compatible to ETV 260 / 3000 SWP. The external black and white CGA compatible can be installed on a pivotable arm. As mass storage there could be one 720 kB MS-DOS compatible floppy drive, or two of them, or one of them plus 20 MB XTA interface based harddisk.

=== VM 2000 (1989) ===
This is same like ETV 2900, the only difference is modified BIOS to prevent user to boot from standard MS-DOS diskettes. So always the VM 2000 own diskettes have to be used. This prevented the user to run other MS-DOS based applications on VM 2000. This is explained by employment laws in the difference of a typewriter- and a PC worker.

=== ETV 3000 (1988) ===
This is mostly a renamed ETV 260, the only difference is that it has different video connector to support the CRT black & white monitor of ETV 2700.

=== ETV 4000s (1989) ===
ETV 400 is similar to ETV 500, but the base is not M19 PC, but M290. So with Intel 80286 CPU this wordprocessing system was running Windows 2.0 with the wordprocessing software of ETV 4000s. The standard printer was TH700 which is more or less a keyboard/floppydrive-less version of the ETV 210s.

=== Jetwriter 910 (1992) ===
By 1994, Olivetti stopped production of typewriters, as more and more users were transitioning to personal computers.

== See also ==
- Olivetti computers
