= Olivetti Lettera 22 =

Italian design typewriter model

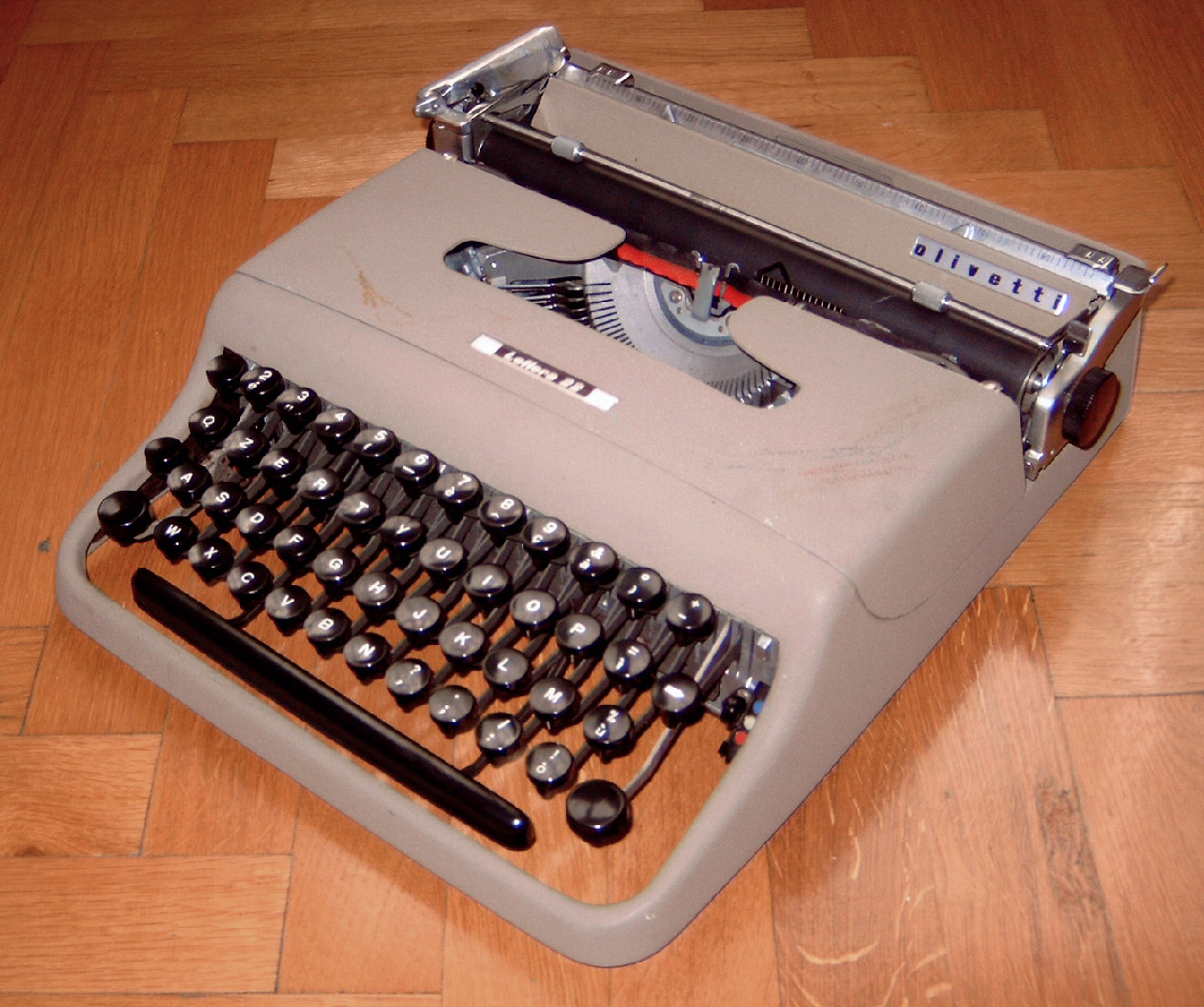
A Lettera 22, first model

The Olivetti Lettera 22 [oliˈvetti ˈlɛttera ˌventiˈduːe] is a portable mechanical typewriter designed by Marcello Nizzoli in 1949 or, according to the company's current owner Telecom Italia, 1950. This typewriter was very popular in Italy. Nizzoli received the Compasso d'Oro prize for it in 1954. In 1959 the Illinois Institute of Technology chose the Lettera 22 as the best designed product of the last 100 years.

The typewriter is about 27x37x8 cm (with the carriage return lever adding another 1–2 centimeters in height), making it quite portable for the time's standards, even though its 3.7 kg (8.2 lb) weight may somewhat limit portability.

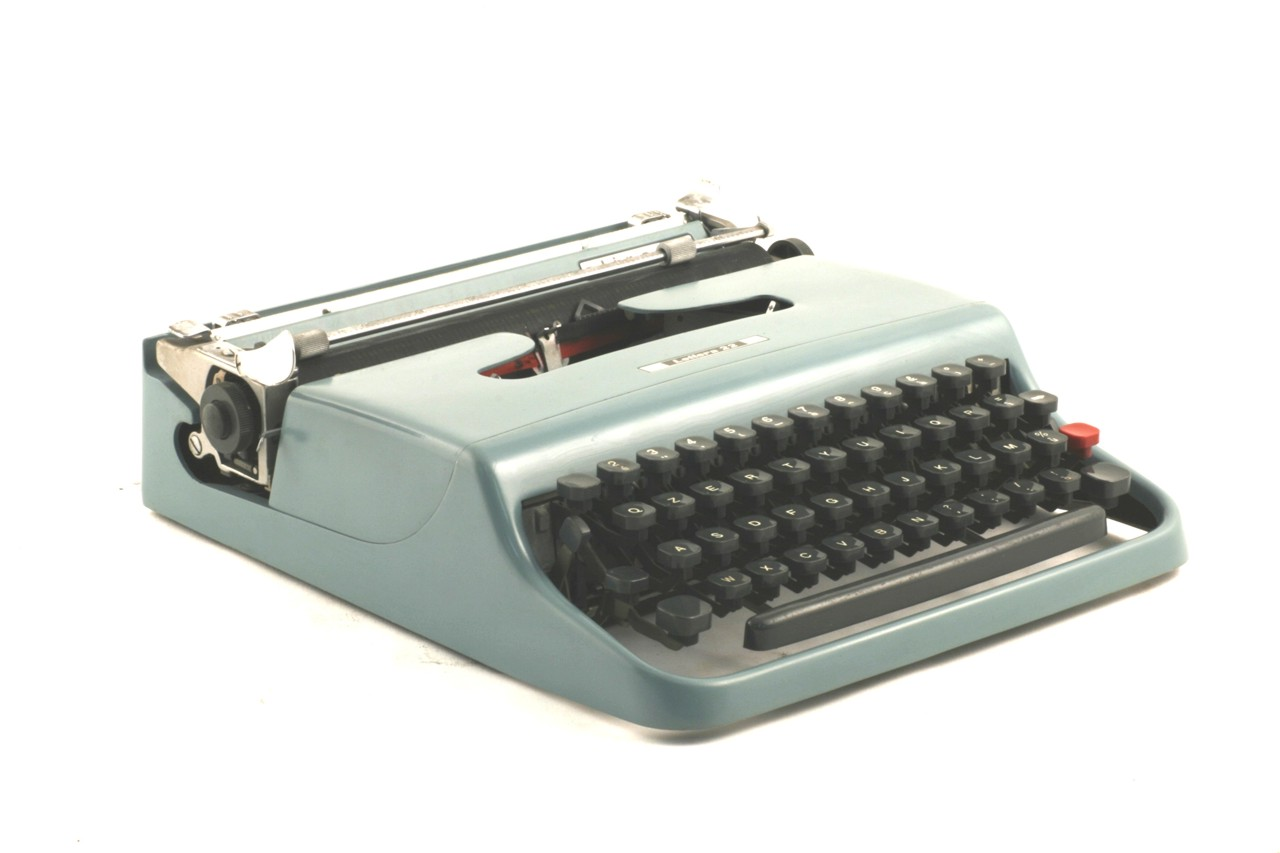
3/4 view of the Lettera 22

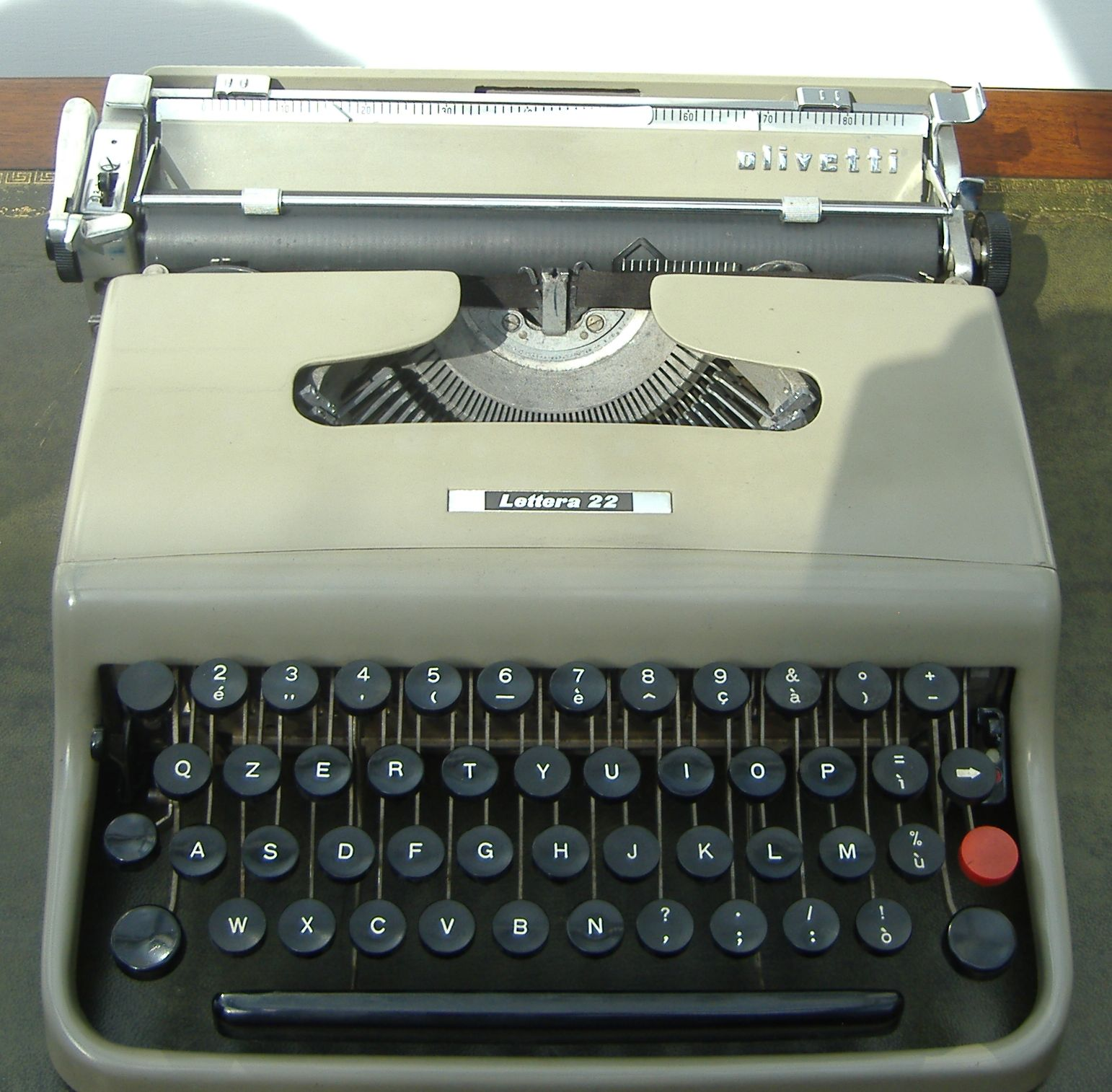
A front view of the Lettera 22

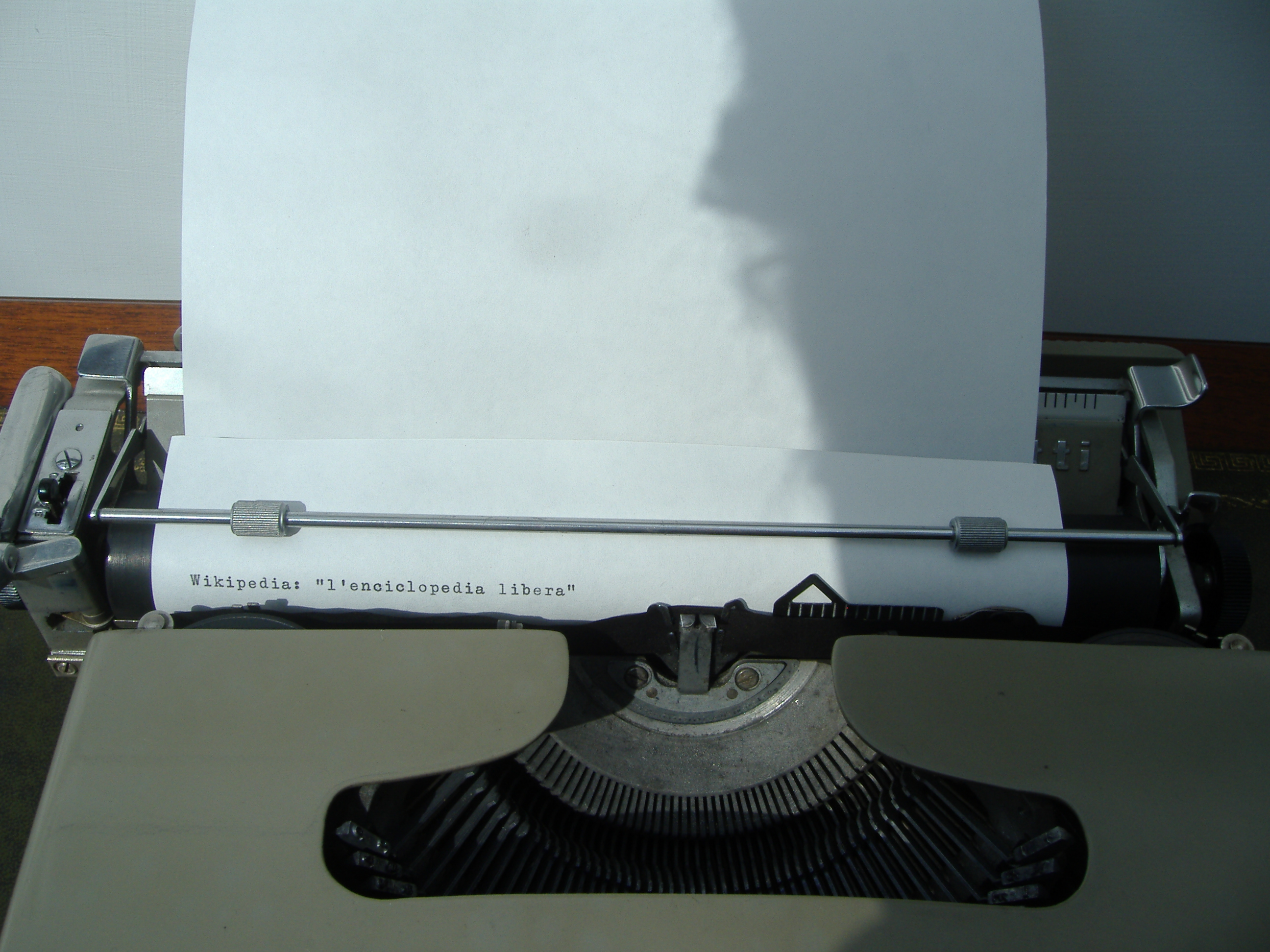
The Lettera 22: "Wikipedia, l'enciclopedia libera"

The Lettera 22

The Lettera 22 was rebranded and marketed in the United States as the Sears Courier and Diplomat, with red bodywork and white keys. It was succeeded in 1963 by the Olivetti Lettera 32.

== Famous Users ==
Many notable figures have used examples of the Lettera 22 as a work tool:

- Pier Paolo Pasolini, journalist, writer, and director;
- Carlo Biotti, judge;
- Enzo Biagi, journalist and writer;
- Cesare Marchi, journalist and writer;
- Indro Montanelli, journalist and writer;
- Philip Roth, writer;
- Günter Grass, writer;
- Will Self, novelist;
- Leonard Cohen, poet and singer;
- Tom Hanks, actor;
- Joan Didion, writer.
- Peter Matthiessen, writer and naturalist.

== Mechanics ==
The Lettera 22 is an oblique frontstroke typebar typewriter. The typebars strike a red/black inked ribbon, which is positioned between the typebar and the paper by a lever whenever a key is pressed; a small switch located near the upper right side of the keyboard can be used to control the strike position of the ribbon, in order to print with black, red, or no ink (for mimeograph stencils).

Ribbon movement, which also occurs at every keypress, automatically reverses direction when there is no ribbon left on the feed reel; two mechanical sensors, situated next to each wheel, move when the ribbon is put under tension (indicating ribbon end), attaching the appropriate wheel to the ribbon transport mechanism and detaching the other.

The Lettera 22 uses a basket shift or segment shift (that is, the unit including the typebars moves up and down when shifting, as opposed to the full carriage shift system or hinged carriage shift). The Lettera 22 is quite compact compared to other 1950s portable typewriters using a basket shift, such as the Smith Corona Sterling or Remington-Rand Quiet-Riter.

The Lettera 22 also features a tabulator setting and clearing system that is controlled from the keyboard, and an innovative margin release that does double duty as a paragraph indentation key (it indents a paragraph when it is held down as the carriage is returned).

== Keyboard ==
For the Italian market the keyboard is in the QZERTY layout, as with most Italian machines (excluding modern computer keyboards). Aside from the typing keys, the keyboard includes a space bar, two shift keys, one caps lock key, a backspace key and a margin release key. Of these, only the backspace key bears a mark on it (an arrow pointing right), while the other five mentioned are left anonymous.

The character set conspicuously lacks the numbers 0 and 1, which are supposed to be substituted by uppercase "O" and lowercase "l". Although this may seem like a strange absence today, this was actually common on older typewriters.

Also lacking are the keys for uppercase accented vowels, some of which are present in Italian; however, these characters are not typically found on modern keyboards, either.

The keyboard for the American variant is in the QWERTY layout. Although the character set lacks the number "1", presumably to be replaced by the lowercase "l", the "0" is present. One key has the fractions 1/2 and (shifted) 1/4, while another has ¢ (cents) and (shifted) @. A $ is present above the number "4". A British version varies in that it has the "@" placed above the number "4", as well as having the fractions 2/3 and (shifted) 1/3 where the American version has ¢ and (shifted) @.

== Layout (Italian Keyboard) ==
=== Normal ===
é " ' ( _ è ^ ç à ) -
q z e r t y u i o p ì
a s d f g h j k l m ù
w x c v b n , ; : ò

=== Shifted ===
2 3 4 5 6 7 8 9 & ° +
Q Z E R T Y U I O P =
A S D F G H J K L M %
W X C V B N ? . / !

== In popular culture ==
The Olivetti Lettera 22 is mentioned in Thomas Pynchon's 2009 novel Inherent Vice.

The Olivetti Lettera 22 typewriter was featured in the 1960 film Purple Noon as well as its 1999 remake The Talented Mr. Ripley.

The Olivetti Lettera 22 is used by the character Oliver Tate in the 2010 Richard Ayoade film Submarine.

In the 1991 David Cronenberg film Naked Lunch, an Olivetti Lettera 22 is used as a prop, with its badge replaced to rebrand it as a "Martinelli".

Lettera 22 is the name of a song by the band Cugini di Campagna, entered into the Sanremo Music Festival 2023. The typewriter can be seen in the music video for the song. The song finished in 21st place.

Italian journalist and newspaper director Indro Montanelli used his Lettera 22 almost everywhere. A monument in Milan's public gardens Giardini Pubblici Indro Montanelli, inspired from a famous photo of Montanelli from the 1950s, is dedicated to him and his Lettera 22.

German writer Günter Grass had three Olivetti Letteras, which he used exclusively at his homes in Portugal, Germany (Schleswig-Holstein) and Denmark.

American writer Joan Didion mentions her Olivetti Lettera 22 in her book Where I Was From (2003), recalling that she typed her first novel, Run, River (1963), on it.

William S. Burroughs replaced his Remington typewriter with a Lettera 22 in 1964.

Austrian composer Olga Neuwirth requested an Olivetti Lettera 22 in her 2018 piece Magic Flu-idity for solo-flute (and typewriter).

Sylvia Plath used an Olivetti Lettera 22 on Cape Cod with Ted Hughes in July 1957: "They had no phone and no car, just their bicycles, Sylvia's new Olivetti Lettera 22 typewriter (a gift from Aurelia), some books, and clothes"

== See also ==
- Olivetti typewriters (all models)
- Olivetti S.p.A.
