= David G. Cory =

Canadian scientist

- Education: Case Western Reserve University
- Known for: NMR quantum computer Quantum information processing Quantum control Neutron interferometry
- Scientific career
- Workplaces: Bruker Corporation; Massachusetts Institute of Technology; University of Waterloo; Perimeter Institute for Theoretical Physics
- Thesis: Applications of Cross Polarization Spin Dynamics in Solids (1987)
- Doctoral advisor: William M. Ritchey
- Doctoral students: Paola Cappellaro; Sarah Sheldon

David G. Cory is a Professor of Chemistry at the University of Waterloo where he holds the Canada Excellence Research Chair in Quantum Information Processing. He works at the Institute for Quantum Computing, and is also associated with the Waterloo Institute for Nanotechnology.

== Education and career ==
Cory was educated at Case Western Reserve University, earning a bachelor's degree there in 1981 and a Ph.D. in chemistry in 1987. He carried out postdoctoral research at Radboud University Nijmegen in the Netherlands and at Naval Research Laboratory in Washington, D.C. He was a Professor of Nuclear Engineering at Massachusetts Institute of Technology prior to his 2010 appointment at Waterloo. At MIT, he worked on NMR, including his work on NMR quantum computation. Together with Amr Fahmy and Timothy Havel he developed the concept of pseudo-pure states and performed the first experimental demonstrations of NMR quantum computing.

Cory's research also concerns the realization and application of quantum control in various physical systems and devices. In 2015, he and teams from University of Waterloo, National Institute of Standards and Technology and Boston University demonstrated the generation and control of orbital angular momentum of neutron beams using a fork-dislocation grating, extending the existing work in optical and electron beams to neutrons. They subsequently demonstrated the control of both the spin and orbital angular momentum degrees of freedom of neutron beams.

== See also ==
- NMR quantum computer
- Randomized benchmarking
- List of University of Waterloo people
