= Sarah Sheldon =

American quantum computing researcher

Sarah Sheldon is an American engineering physicist who develops quantum computing devices for IBM Quantum, at the Thomas J. Watson Research Center in Yorktown Heights, New York. She works for IBM as a principal research scientist and as senior manager of quantum theory and capabilities.

Sheldon was a student at the Massachusetts Institute of Technology (MIT), where she earned a double bachelor's degree in physics and nuclear science and engineering. She continued at MIT for a 2013 Ph.D., also including research at the University of Waterloo Institute for Quantum Computing (IQC). Her research was supervised by David G. Cory, and she continued to work as a postdoctoral research with Cory at the IQC before, seeking more practical applications for her expertise than she would find in an academic position, she joined IBM after completing her doctorate.

Sheldon was named as a Fellow of the American Physical Society (APS) in 2025, after a nomination from the APS Forum on Industrial & Applied Physics, "for seminal contributions to the realization and application of practical quantum computing".
