= Nanodiamond =

Extremely small diamonds used for their thermal, mechanical and optoelectronic properties

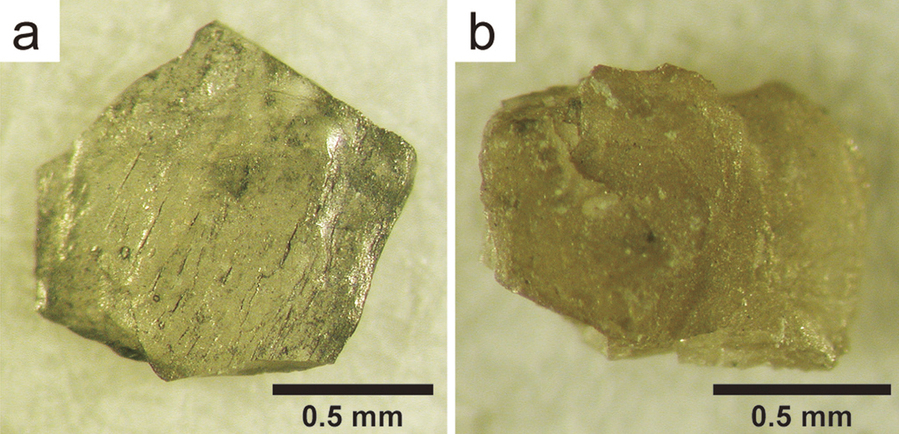
Natural nanodiamond aggregates from the Popigai impact structure, Siberia, Russia.

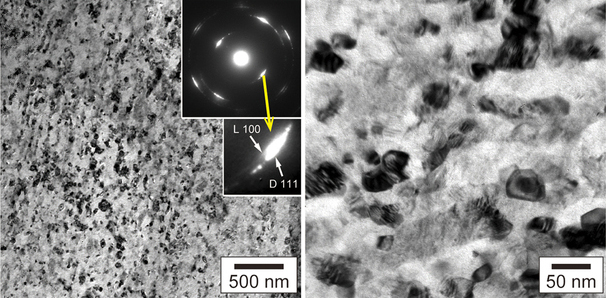
Internal structure of the Popigai nanodiamonds.

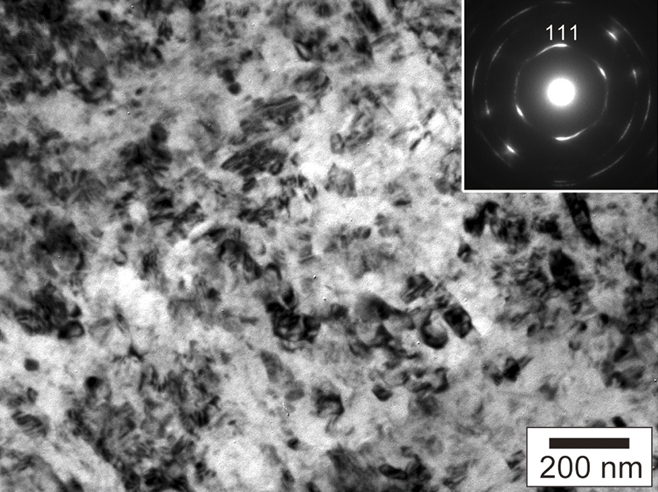
Internal structure of synthetic nanodiamonds.

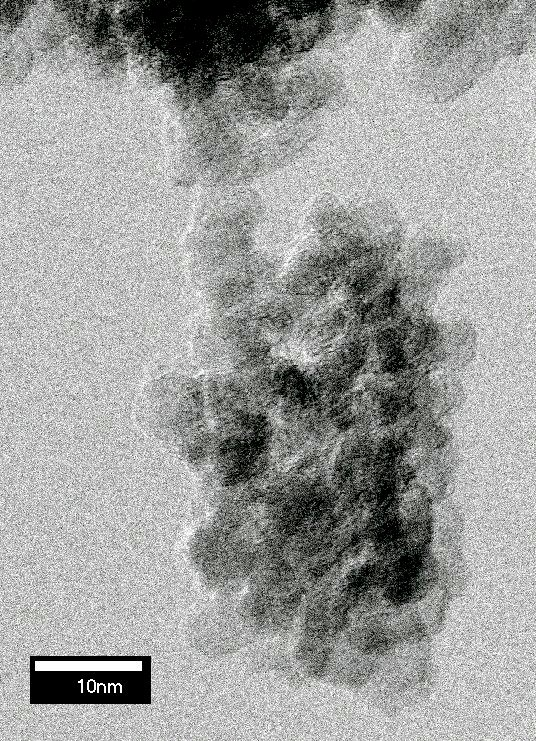
Electron micrograph of detonation nanodiamonds

Nanodiamonds, or diamond nanoparticles, are diamonds with a size below 100 nanometers. They can be produced by impact events such as an explosion or meteoritic impacts. Because of their inexpensive, large-scale synthesis, potential for surface functionalization, and high biocompatibility, nanodiamonds are widely investigated as a potential material in biological and electronic applications and quantum engineering.

== History ==
In 1963, Soviet scientists at the All-Union Research Institute of Technical Physics noticed that nanodiamonds were created by nuclear explosions that used carbon-based trigger explosives.

== Structure and composition ==
There are three main aspects in the structure of diamond nanoparticles to be considered: the overall shape, the core, and the surface. Through multiple diffraction experiments, it has been determined that the overall shape of diamond nanoparticles is either spherical or elliptical. At the core of diamond nanoparticles lies a diamond cage, which is composed mainly of carbons. While the core closely resemble the structure of a diamond, the surface of diamond nanoparticles actually resemble the structure of graphite. A recent study shows that the surface consists mainly of carbons, with high amounts of phenols, pyrones, and sulfonic acid, as well as carboxylic acid groups, hydroxyl groups, and epoxide groups, though in lesser amounts. Occasionally, defects such as nitrogen-vacancy centers can be found in the structure of diamond nanoparticles. ^{15}N NMR research confirms presence of such defects. A recent study shows that the frequency of nitrogen-vacancy centers decreases with the size of diamond nanoparticles.

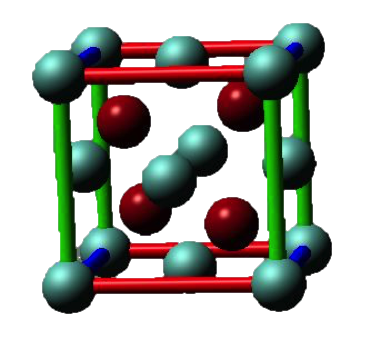
Figure 1: Classic "Diamond" Structure: Face-Centered Cubic with Tetrahedral Holes Filled with Four Atoms

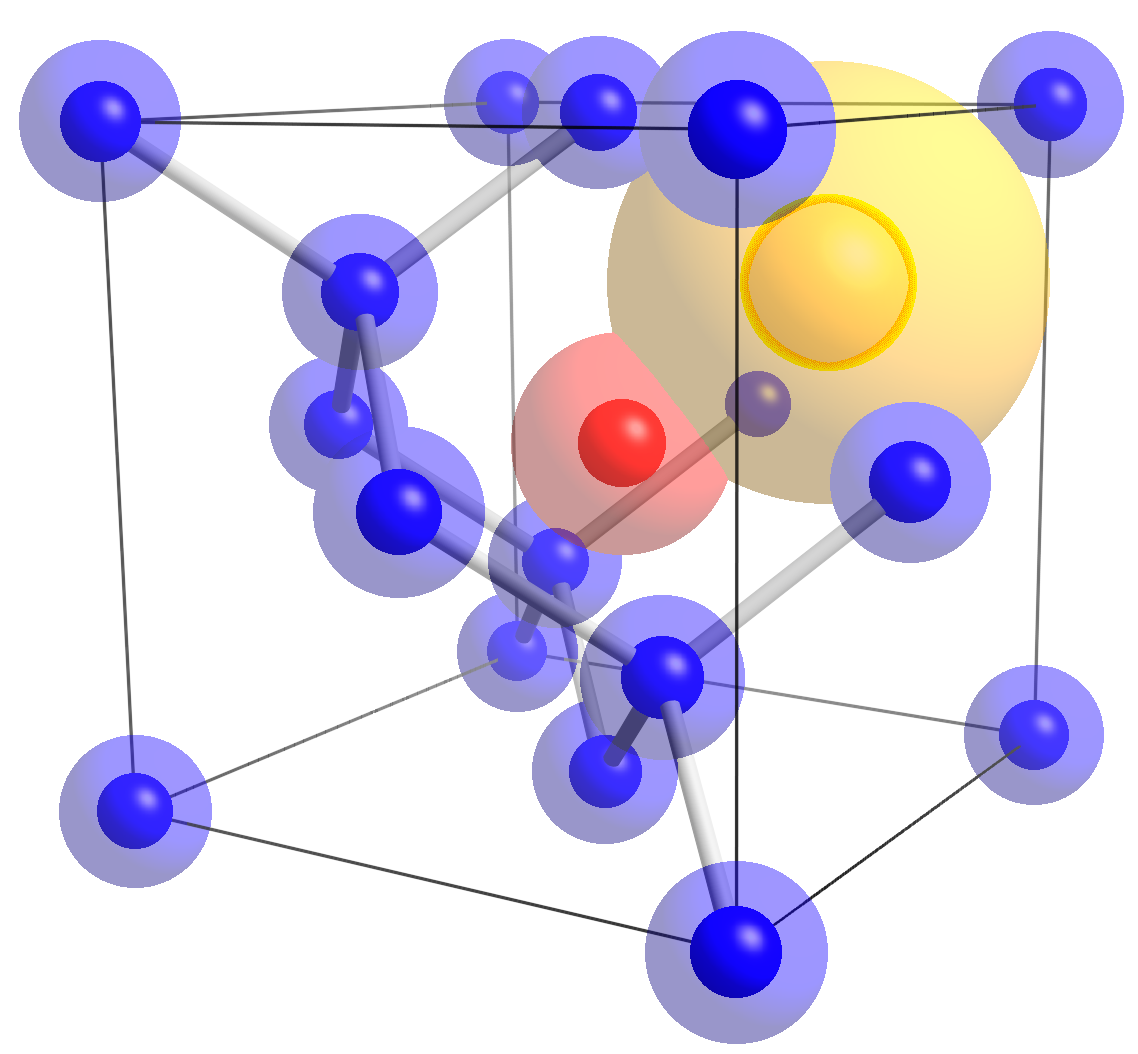
Figure 2: View A of Nitrogen-vacancy Center: the blue atoms represent Carbon atoms, red atom represents Nitrogen atom substituting for a Carbon atom, and yellow atom represents a lattice vacancy

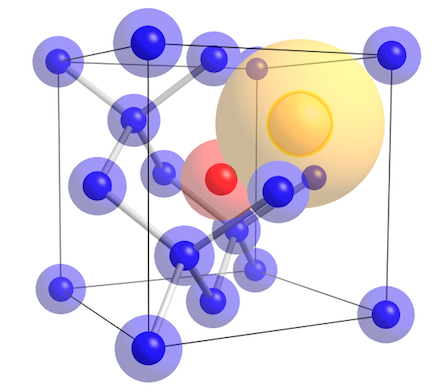
Figure 3: View B of Nitrogen-vacancy Center

== Production methods ==
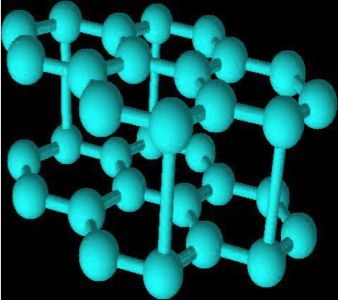
Figure 4: Graphitic Carbon (produced as byproduct of detonation synthesis; Van Der Waals interactions partially shown)

Detonation synthesis of non or weakly fluorescent nanodiamonds has become the industry standard in the commercial production of nanodiamonds: the most commonly utilized explosives being mixtures of trinitrotoluene and hexogen or octogen. Detonation is often performed in a sealed, oxygen-free, stainless steel chamber and yields a mixture of nanodiamonds averaging 5 nm and other graphitic compounds. In detonation synthesis, nanodiamonds form under pressures greater than 15 GPa and temperatures greater than 3000K in the absence of oxygen to prevent the oxidation of diamond nanoparticles. The rapid cooling of the system increases nanodiamond yields as diamond remains the most stable phase under such conditions. Detonation synthesis utilizes gas-based and liquid-based coolants such as argon and water, water-based foams, and ice. Because detonation synthesis results in a mix of nanodiamond particles and other graphitic carbon forms, extensive cleaning methods must be employed to rid the mixture of impurities. In general, gaseous ozone treatment or solution-phase nitric acid oxidation is utilized to remove sp2 carbons and metal impurities.

Other than explosions, methods of production include hydrothermal synthesis, ion bombardment, laser heating, microwave plasma chemical vapor deposition techniques, ultrasound synthesis, and electrochemical synthesis. In addition, high-yield synthesis of fluorescent nanodiamonds can be achieved by grinding electron-irradiated cubic crystalline diamond obtained from nitrogen-containing or nitrogen-free carbon precursors. Another method is the decomposition of graphitic C_{3}N_{4} under high pressure and high temperature which yields large quantities of high purity diamond nanoparticles. Nanodiamonds are also formed by dissociation of ethanol vapour. and via ultrafast laser filamentation in ethanol.

== Potential applications ==
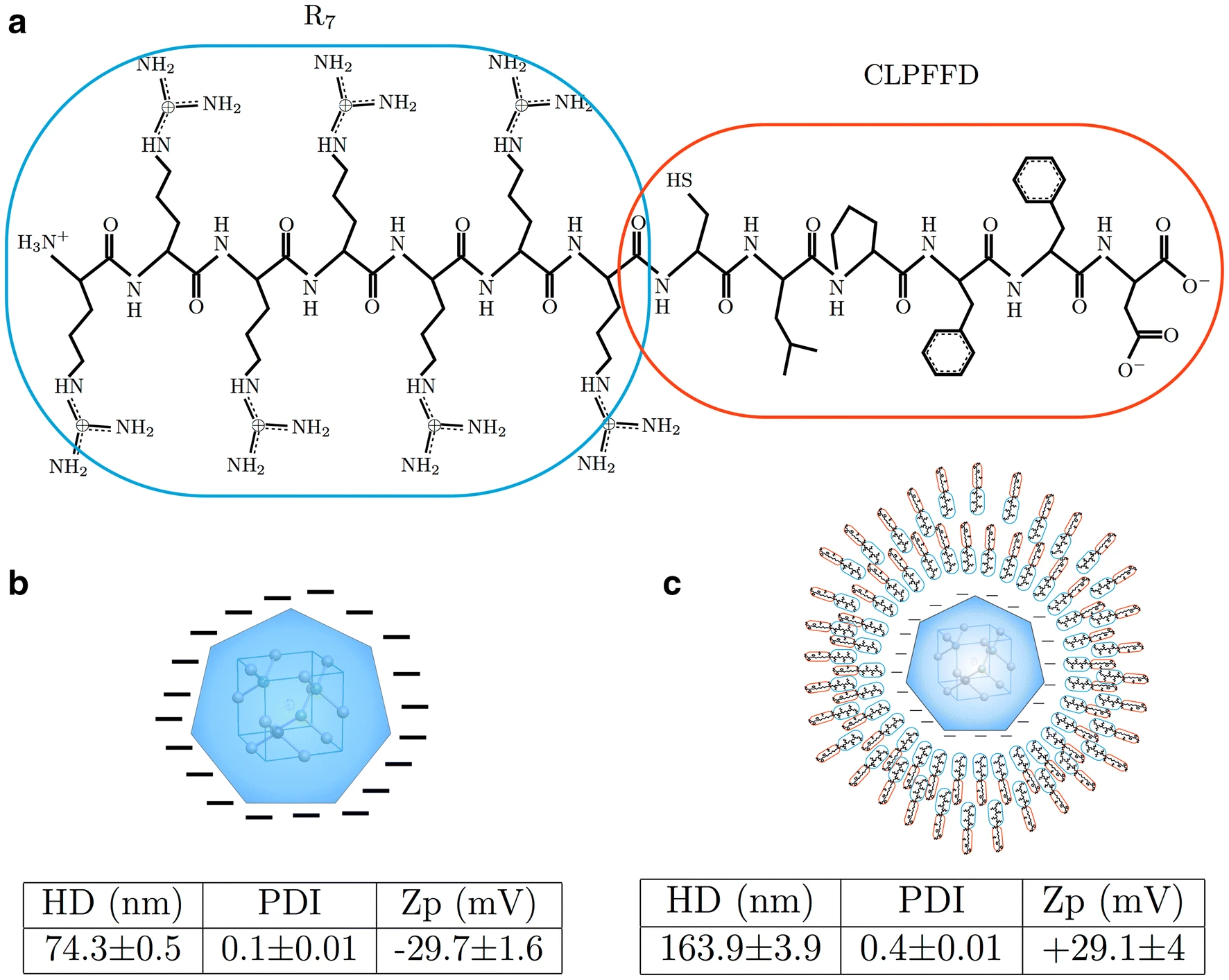
Nanodiamonds (b) can be combined (c) with functional molecules (a), as illustrated here with red and blue peptides whose functions are (red) to bind an intracellular target (amyloid β aggregates) and (blue) to facilitate delivery into the cell. The nanodiamond has been engineered to have a nitrogen-vacancy center that provides for fluorescence that can be observed using fluorescence microscopy and is more photostable than that of conventional fluorescence markers. The coupling of the nanodiamond with the functional molecules changes its physicochemical properties, including hydrodynamic diameter (HD), polydispersity index (PDI) and Zeta potential (Zp).

The N-V center defect consists of a nitrogen atom in place of a carbon atom next to a vacancy (empty space instead of an atom) within the diamond's lattice structure. Recent advances (up to 2019) in the field of nanodiamonds in quantum sensing applications using NVs have been summarized in the following review.

Applying a microwave pulse to such a defect switches the direction of its electron spin. Applying a series of such pulses (Walsh decoupling sequences) causes them to act as filters. Varying the number of pulses in a series switched the spin direction a different number of times. They efficiently extract spectral coefficients while suppressing decoherence, thus improving sensitivity. Signal-processing techniques were used to reconstruct the entire magnetic field.

The prototype used a 3 mm-diameter square diamond, but the technique can scale down to tens of nanometers.

=== Nano-abrasive ===
Nanodiamonds share the hardness and chemical stability of visible-scale diamonds, making them candidates for applications such as polishes and engine oil additives for improved lubrication.

=== Medical ===
Diamond nanoparticles have the potential to be used in myriad biological applications and due to their unique properties such as inertness and hardness, nanodiamonds may prove to be a better alternative to the traditional nanomaterials currently utilized to carry drugs, coat implantable materials, and synthesize biosensors and biomedical robots. The low cytotoxicity of diamond nanoparticles affirms their utilization as biologically compatible materials.

In vitro studies exploring the dispersion of diamond nanoparticles in cells have revealed that most diamond nanoparticles exhibit fluorescence and are uniformly distributed. Fluorescent nanodiamond particles can be mass produced through irradiating diamond nanocrystallites with helium ions. Fluorescent nanodiamond is photostable, chemically inert, and has extended fluorescent lifetime, making it a great candidate for many biological applications. Studies have shown that small photoluminescent diamond nanoparticles that remain free in the cytosol are excellent contenders for the transport of biomolecules.

==== In-vitro diagnostics ====
Nanodiamonds containing nitrogen-vacancy defects have been used as an ultrasensitive label for in vitro diagnostics, using a microwave field to modulate emission intensity and frequency-domain analysis to separate the signal from background autofluorescence. Combined with recombinase polymerase amplification, nanodiamonds enable single-copy detection of HIV-1 RNA on a low-cost lateral flow test format.

==== Drug delivery ====
Diamond nanoparticles of ~5 nm in size offer a large accessible surface and tailorable surface chemistry. They have unique optical, mechanical and thermal properties and are non-toxic. The potential of nanodiamond in drug delivery has been demonstrated, fundamental mechanisms, thermodynamics and kinetics of drug adsorption on nanodiamond are poorly understood. Important factors include purity, surface chemistry, dispersion quality, temperature and ionic composition.

Nanodiamonds (with attached molecules) are able to penetrate the blood–brain barrier that isolates the brain from most insults. In 2013 doxorubicin molecules (a popular cancer-killing drug) were bonded to nanodiamond surfaces, creating the drug ND-DOX. Tests showed that tumors were unable to eject the compound, increasing the drug's ability to impact the tumor and reducing side-effects.

Larger nanodiamonds, due to their "high uptake efficiency", have the potential to serve as cellular labels. Studies have concluded that diamond nanoparticles are similar to carbon nanotubes and upon being treated with surfactants, the stability and biocompatibility of both carbon nanotubes and the nanodiamonds in solution greatly increase. In addition, the ability to surface functionalize nanodiamonds of small diameters provides various possibilities for diamond nanoparticles to be utilized as biolabels with potentially low cytotoxicity.

==== Catalysis ====
Decreasing particle size and functionalizing their surfaces may allow such surface-modified diamond nanoparticles to deliver proteins, which can then provide an alternative to traditional catalysts.

==== Skin care ====
Nanodiamonds are well-absorbed by human skin. They also absorb more of the ingredients in skin care products than skin itself. Thus they cause more of the ingredients to penetrate the deeper layers of the skin. Nanodiamonds also form strong bonds with water, helping to hydrate the skin.

==== Surgery ====
During jaw and tooth repair operations, doctors normally use invasive surgery to stick a sponge containing bone-growth-stimulating proteins near the affected area. However, nanodiamonds bind to both bone morphogenetic protein and fibroblast growth factor, both of which encourage bone and cartilage to rebuild and can be delivered orally. Nanodiamond has also been successfully incorporated into gutta percha in root canal therapy.

==== Blood testing ====
Defected nanodiamonds can measure the orientation of electron spins in external fields and thus measure their strength. They can electrostatically absorb ferritin proteins on the diamond surface where their numbers can be measured directly as well as the number of iron atoms (as many as 4,500) that make up the protein.

=== Electronics and sensors ===
==== Sensor ====
Naturally occurring defects in nanodiamonds called nitrogen-vacancy (N-V) centers, have been used to measure changes over time in weak magnetic fields, much like a compass does with Earth's magnetic field. The sensors can be used at room temperature, and since they consist entirely of carbon, they could be injected into living cells without causing them any harm, Paola Cappellaro says. Moreover, nanodiamond can be exploited as sensor for some specific analytes. Boron-doped diamond (BDD) produced by energy-assisted (plasma or hot filament, HF) Chemical Vapor Deposition (CVD) processes is a good candidatein Dopamine detection, however it is not selective towards some interferents. This issue, can be overcome via further post-synthesis treatments for BDD surface modifications including anodization, hydrogen plasma, etching into porous forms, carbon-based nanomaterials, polymer films and nanoparticles. Recent studies, propose a new approach for the realization of Titanium doped diamond-based electrodes with a native selectivity towards dopamine, through substrate pre-treatments (lapping, electropolishing and chemical etching) instead of post-process treatments. Moreover, Nanodiamond has been proven to modify some electronic properties of polymer-based matrix. Those modifications, which can be summarised as an increase in the ionic conductivity of the system, thus of a decrease in the impedance, are likely due to the presence of functional groups on the nanodiamond particle surface. Those groups can interact with polymer chains, thus facilitating ionic exchanges.

==== Nanomechanical sensor and nanoelectromechanical system (NEMS) ====
Recent studies have shown that nanoscale diamonds can be bent to a local maximum tensile elastic strain in excess of 9%, with the corresponding maximum tensile stress reached ~100 gigapascals, making them ideal for high-performance nanomechanical sensor and NEMS applications.

==== Optical computing ====
Nanodiamonds offer an alternative to photonic metamaterials for optical computing. The same single-defect nanodiamonds that can be used to sense magnetic fields can also use combinations of green and infrared light to enable/disrupt light transmission, allowing the construction of transistors and other logic elements.

==== Quantum computing ====
Nanodiamonds with NV centers may serve as a solid-state alternative to trapped ions for room-temperature quantum computing.

==== Imaging ====
Fluorescent nanodiamonds offer a stable reference for the quality control purposes in fluorescence and multiharmonic imaging systems.

== Prizes and awards ==
- 2012 Ig Nobel Peace Prize: The SKN Company, for converting old Russian ammunition into new diamonds
- In 2015 Amanda Barnard, Science Leader of Australia's Office of the Chief Executive (OCE), The Commonwealth Scientific and Industrial Research Organisation (CSIRO), received the Theory Prize at the Foresight Institutes' Feynman Awards for nanotechnology. Using theoretical and computational methods, Amanda Barnard increased understanding of the structure and stability of carbon nanostructures and the role that shape plays in establishing properties and interactions under different conditions. The Prize announced focused on her work on diamond nanoparticles (nanodiamonds).

== See also ==
- Aggregated diamond nanorod, a nanocrystalline form of diamond also known as nanodiamond or hyperdiamond
- Detonation nanodiamond
- Fiveling, twinned structure common in nanodiamonds
- Icosahedral twins, structure common in nanodiamonds
