= Natale Capellaro Walkway =

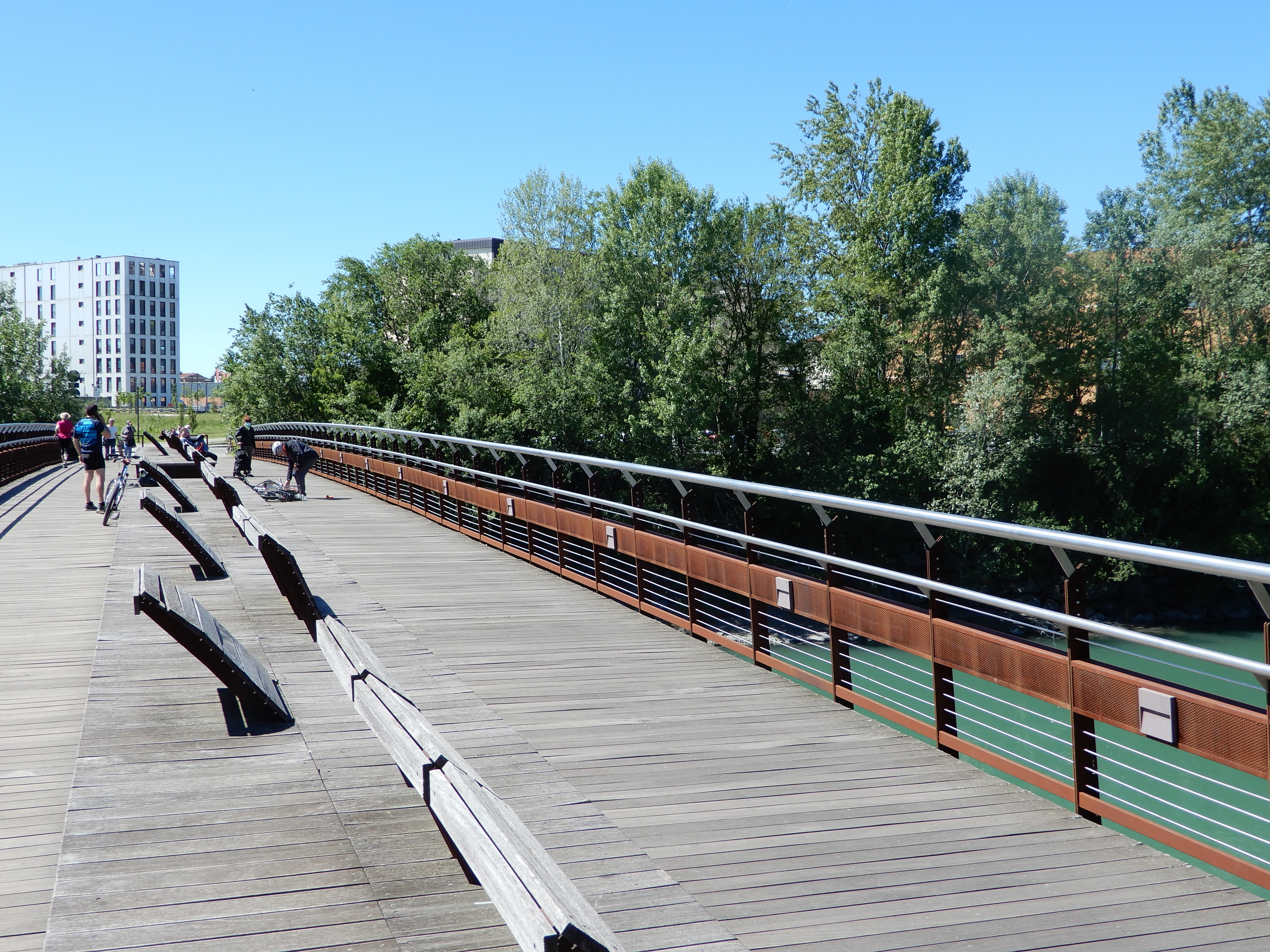
- Natale Capellaro Walkway in 2021
- Coordinates: 45°27′46.63″N 7°52′53.59″E
- Crosses: Dora Baltea
- Locale: Ivrea, Italy
- Official name: Passerella Natale Capellaro

History
- Opened: 2013

Location
- Interactive map of Natale Capellaro Walkway

The Natale Capellaro Walkway (Italian: Passerella Natale Capellaro) is a footbridge over the Dora Baltea in Ivrea, Italy.

== History ==
Plans for the construction of a bridge connecting the two banks of the Dora Baltea downstream from Ivrea's historic center date back to at least the second half of the 20th century.

The project was finally realized and completed in the 2010s, with the walkway being inaugurated on October 12, 2013, by Ivrea's then-mayor, Carlo Della Pepa. The footbridge was named after engineer Natale Capellaro, the creator of several Olivetti calculators, including the Divisumma 24 and the Elettrosumma 22. The total cost of the project was around 3 million euros.

== Description ==
The footbridge consists of three spans measuring 25 metres (82 ft), 30 metres (98 ft), and 25 metres (82 ft) over the Dora Baltea, plus an additional 30 metres (98 ft) span over the discharge channel of a hydroelectric plant located on the side of the river. The deck is 7.20 m (23.6 ft) wide and features curved cantilevers designed to counteract wind pressure. The central section of the bridge is furnished with reclining benches, offering a view of the town's historic center. Part of the deck is covered by two canopies equipped with photovoltaic panels to offset the energy consumption of the lighting system.

== Gallery ==
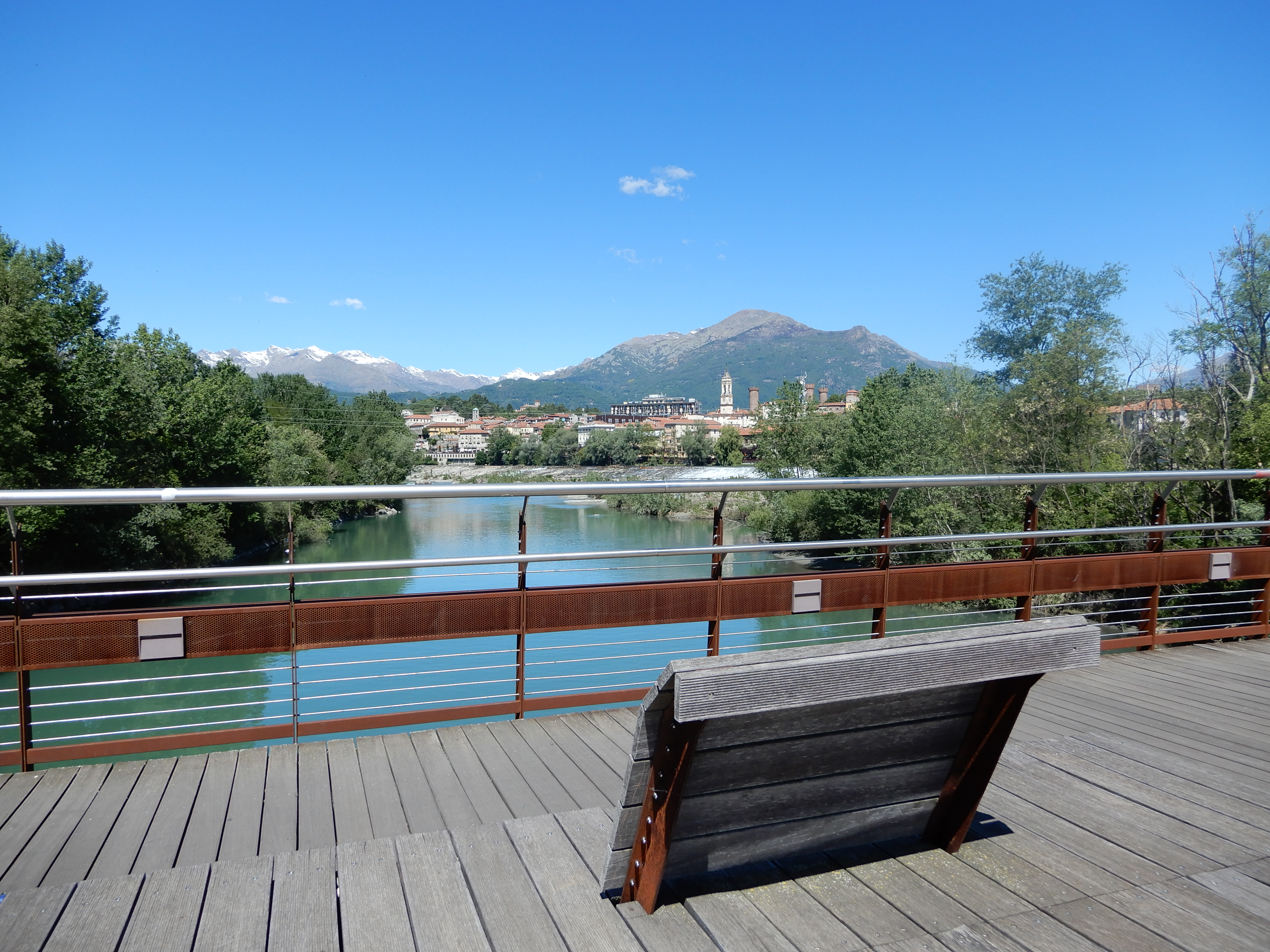

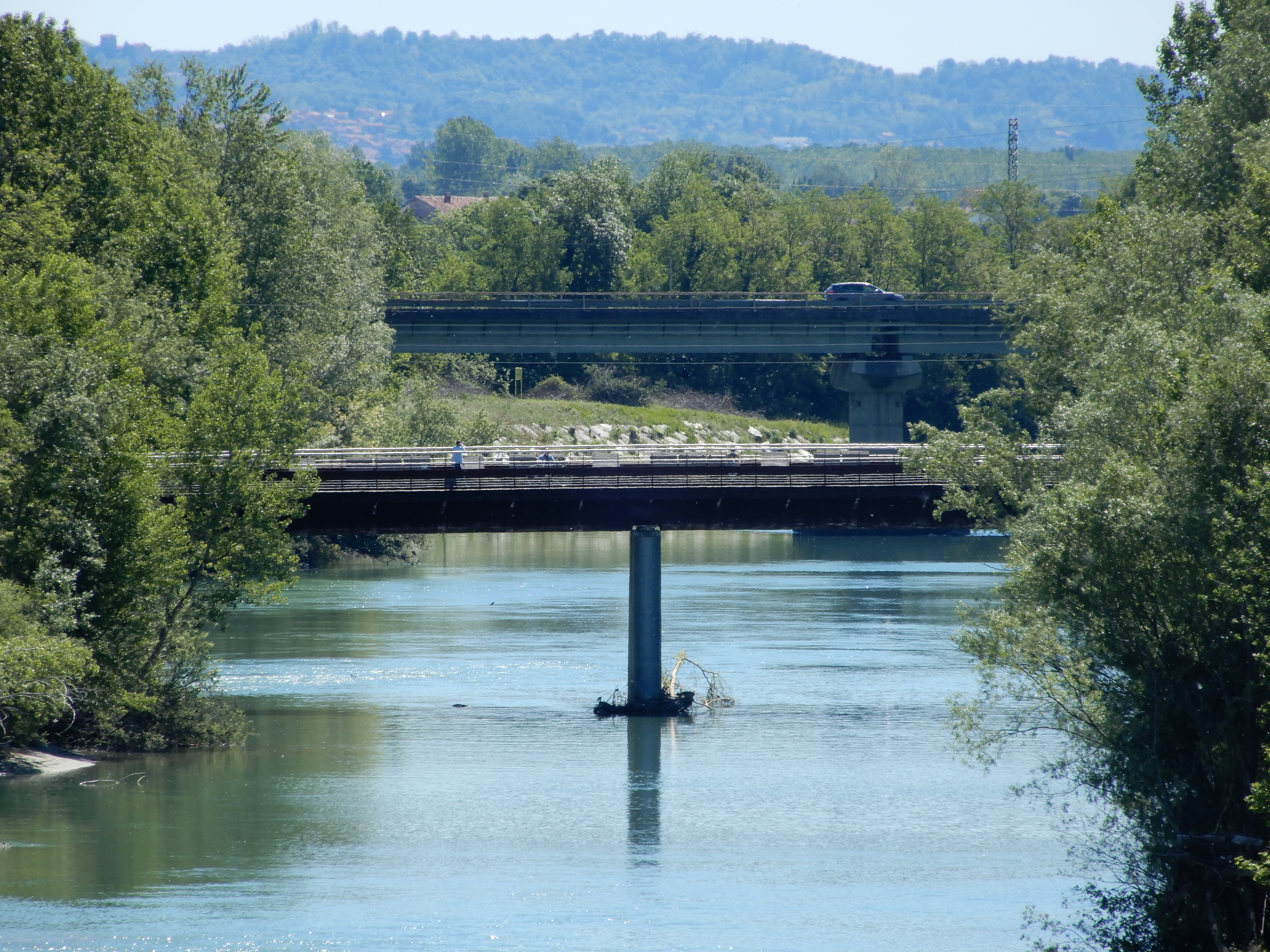

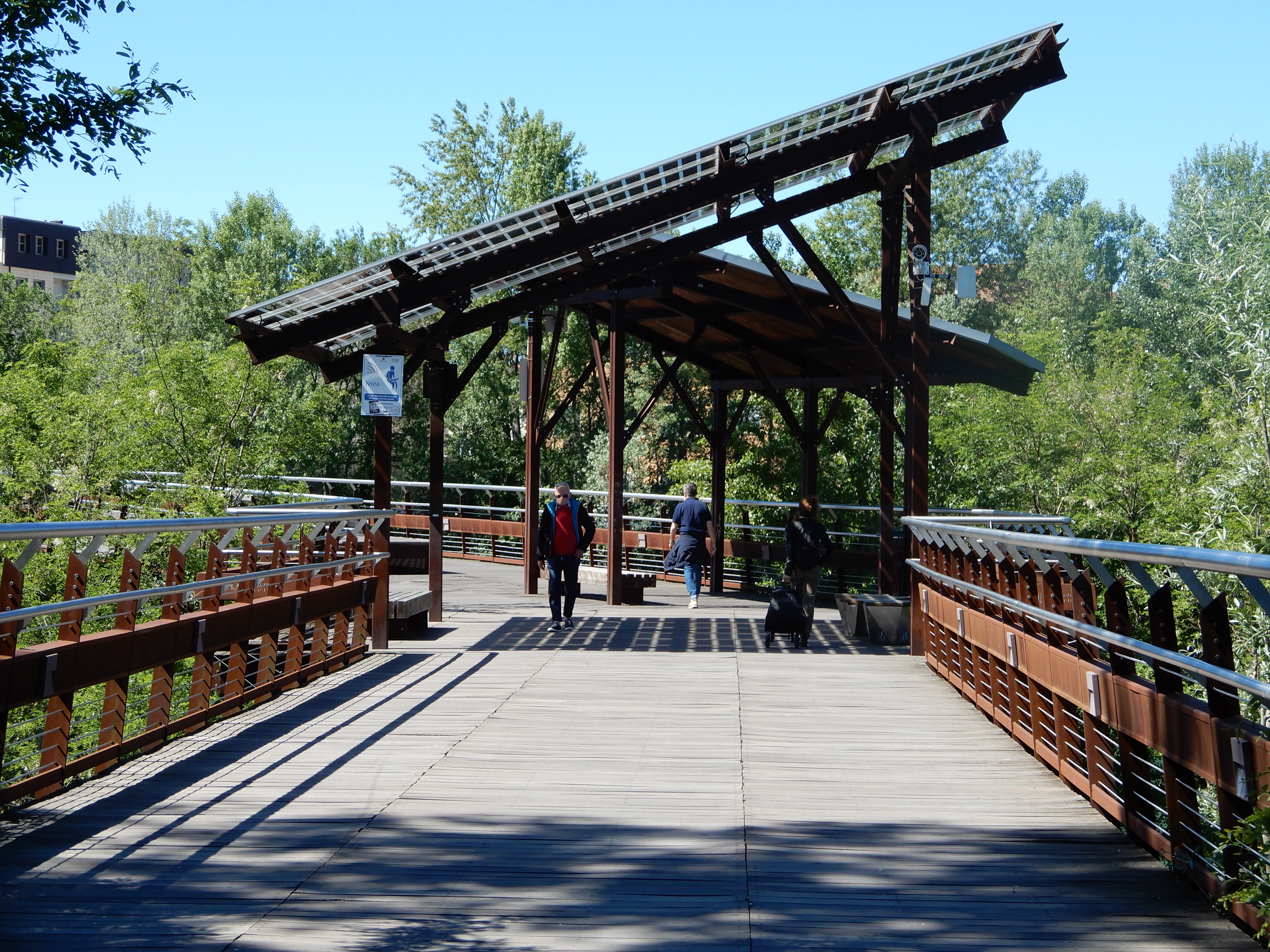
