= Syntrex =

Defunct American computer systems manufacturer

Syntrex Inc.
- Type: Public
- Founded: October 1979; 47 years ago
- Founders: Daniel Sinnott; James Bruno; Little Silver
- Defunct: March 1992; 34 years ago
- Fate: Bankruptcy liquidation
- Products: Word processors; Data processing systems
- Owner: Olivetti S.p.A. (25%)
- Number of employees: 900 (1990, peak)

Syntrex Inc. was a public American computer systems company active from 1979 to 1992. The company had its heyday in the 1980s, when it was one of the largest manufacturers of word processing and data processing systems. Olivetti S.p.A., a major office equipment manufacturer based in Italy, was an early and important investor in Syntrex. Following a steady decline in the late 1980s and early 1990s, the company liquidated its assets after going bankrupt in 1992.

== Corporate history ==
Syntrex was incorporated in October 1979 by Daniel Sinnott, James Bruno, and Little Silver in Eatontown, New Jersey, as an outgrowth of S&B Associates, another company founded by the trio based in Sayreville and founded earlier in 1979. Sinnott was the principal founder of Syntrex; previously, he founded Interdata, a small but influential manufacturer of minicomputers acquired by Perkin-Elmer in 1975. Olivetti S.p.A., an Italian manufacturer of typewriters and other office equipment, was an early investor of Syntrex, acquiring a 25-percent stake in the company in October 1980. In 1981, Syntrex became a public company after filing its initial public offering. In 1986, Syntrex signed a distribution agreement with U-BIX International (a joint venture between the Japanese conglomerates Konica and Mitsubishi, later known as Konica Business Machines International), based in Hamburg, for the distribution of all of Syntrex's systems in Europe.

With the increasing market penetration of DOS-based computer systems, Syntrex was forced to reorient itself strategically. As an important element of Syntrex's PC product strategy was the Syntrex PC Connection, which was released in 1984. A special ISA plug-in card enabled the SOS (Syntrex Operating System; detailed in the next section) to run on IBM Personal Computers and compatibles.

Syntrex reached its peak in the early 1990s and had by then built up complete production, including hardware (from housing to component assembly), at its Eatontown site, with up to 900 employees at times. With the expiration of the existing licensing agreements with Olivetti and the discontinuation of European marketing by Konica Business Machines International in the late 1980s, sales plummeted dramatically. Even American government agencies, among the company's most important customers, became unsettled and stopped placing orders. In the late 1980s, Syntrex attempted to offset its losses by transforming itself into a network integration company. In May 1991, Syntrex reduced its workforce from 900 to 550 and sought a buyer (its stock was trading at 50 cents at the time). In March 1992, after having exited Chapter 11 bankruptcy, Syntrex had its assets sold off to Northcote Partners, a private equity company, and to Phoenix Technologies of Valley Forge, Pennsylvania, a integrator (not to be confused with the BIOS manufacturer of the same name). The Syntrex name soon after disappeared completely from the market.

== Products ==
The manufacturer named its systems after the signs of the zodiac. The Aquarius I was the company's first system; introduced in August 1980, it combined a terminal and an electronic typewriter. This was followed by the Libra, a similar integrated system. Syntrex's systems were sold worldwide and also built under license by other manufacturers.

With the file servers Gemini in 1980 and Virgo in 1985, Syntrex entered the mid-range data technology sector and implemented functionalities using the technical capabilities of the time, just as they can be found in IT systems today. These included functions such as Electronic File Room, a software-based, database-supported keyword index of all files on the file servers, which gave the user the opportunity to quickly find documents with specific text content. The operating systems were based on Unix, which was heavily adapted and sold as the Syntrex Operating System (SOS), and thus as proprietary network software. Syntrex was one of the ever first companies to adapt Unix for commercial use. The systems could be connected to up to 15 file servers in a cluster. The applications included word processing or data processing – called Document Builder (with functions similar to today's XML), electronic mail. Syntrex also implemented a technology in its terminals (based on the 16-bit Intel 8086) called soft scrolling, which resulted in a flicker-free and smooth scrolling of the letters on the monitor.

An unusual idea for the time was the (from today's perspective logical) connection with electronic daisy-wheel typewriters (Brother, Wheelwriter, Olivetti). This convenient combination of keyboard, monitor, and printer enjoyed great popularity in offices with a lot of paperwork, especially in law firms.

In the mid-1980s, Syntrex created a series of virtual file system extensions for its file servers by the name Synpro, with Synpro I for CP/M and Synpro II for DOS. These virtual partitions and file systems enabled users to integrate their personal computers into clusters and share data—all while using electronic typewriters as input and output systems.

Olivetti marketed the Syntrex systems under the names ETS 1010 and ETS 2010. Instead of electronic typewriters, dot matrix printers and independent, specially adapted keyboards could also be used.
