= Remington-Rand Quiet-Riter =

The Remington-Rand Quiet-Riter is a portable, mechanical typewriter manufactured in the 1950s.
