= Paola Cappellaro =

Italian-American engineer

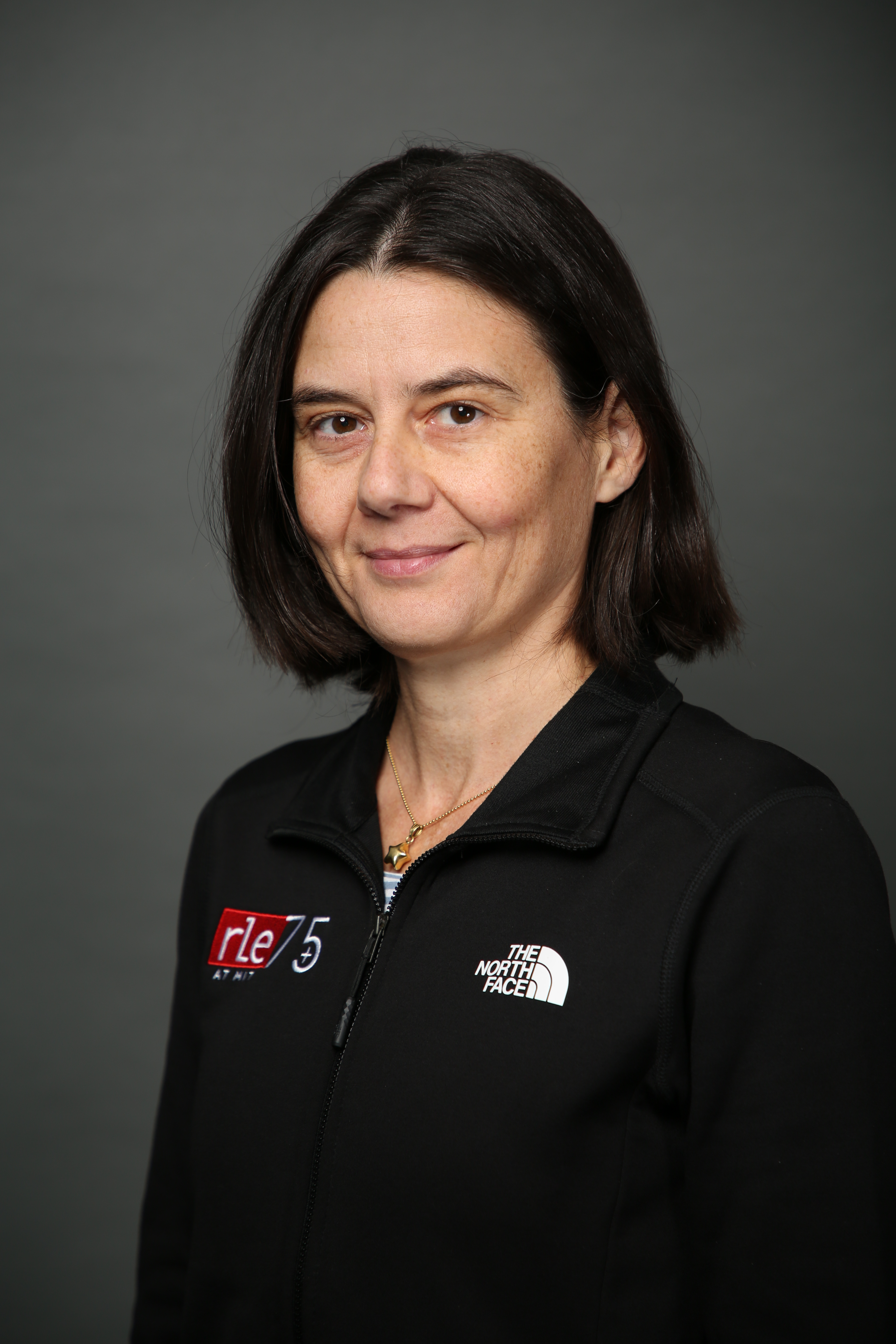
- Education: Polytechnic University of Milan; École Centrale Paris; Massachusetts Institute of Technology
- Scientific career
- Workplaces: Massachusetts Institute of Technology; Harvard University
- Thesis: Quantum information processing in multi-spin systems (2006)
- Doctoral advisor: David G. Cory
- Website: Quantum Engineering Group

Paola Cappellaro is an Italian-American engineer who is a Professor of Nuclear Science and Engineering at the Massachusetts Institute of Technology. Her research considers electron-spin resonance, nuclear magnetic resonance and quantum information processing. She also leads the MIT Quantum Engineering Group at the Center for Ultracold Atoms and is Principal Investigator at the Research Laboratory of Electronics.

== Early life and education ==
Cappellaro was born in Italy, where she attended the Polytechnic University of Milan, majoring in nuclear engineering. She was part of a joint Master's program with the École Centrale Paris, and graduated in 2000. Cappellaro moved to the United States for her graduate studies, where she worked alongside David G. Cory on quantum computation. In 2006, Cappellaro earned her doctorate at the Massachusetts Institute of Technology (MIT). Her doctorate considered quantum state transfer in spin chains, making use of magnetic-based approaches to understand and explore spin transfer dynamics. She completed her postdoctoral training at the Institute for Theoretical Atomic, Molecular and Optical Physics, Harvard University.

== Research and career ==
In 2009, Cappellaro returned to the Massachusetts Institute of Technology, where she was made an Assistant Professor. She serves as Head of the MIT Quantum Engineering Group at the Center for Ultracold Atoms. Cappellaro has developed novel control techniques for electronic and nuclear spin qubits. She realized the first nitrogen-vacancy center diamond-based magnetometers. She pioneered the use of nuclear magnetic resonance to understand the propagation of spin excitations along a chain of interacting spins.

In 2020, Cappellaro demonstrated that it is possible to make use of the nitrogen-vacancy (NV) qubits in diamond to perform quantum operations. These NVs are defects which can be manipulated by electromagnetic waves and respond by emitting light that can carry quantum information. These NV centers are usually surrounded by other 'spin' defects, which have unknown spin properties. When an NV qubit interacts with a spin defect, it loses its coherent state and can no longer perform quantum operations. As NV qubits can be identified and controlled using microwave pulses, they can be used to probe their nearby environments. Subsequent microwave pulses and applied magnetic fields can resonantly excite nearby spin defects, ultimately revealing their location. Cappellaro showed that these defects can then be leveraged as additional qubits, which can be briefly entangled with one another to achieve a coherent quantum state. These manifest as spikes in the resonance spectra. Cappellaro measured the spins of these defects using electron-spin resonance.

Cappellaro is the Ford Professor of Engineering, Professor of Nuclear Science and Engineering and Professor of Physics at MIT.

== Awards and honors ==
- 2004 Manson Benedict Fellowship
- 2012 Air Force Research Laboratory Young Investigator Award
- 2013 Edgerton Professorship
- 2020 Committed to Caring Award
- 2023 Fellow of the American Physical Society "for groundbreaking contributions to quantum control and quantum sensing with spin systems"

== Selected publications ==
- J R Maze; P L Stanwix; J S Hodges; et al. (1 October 2008). "Nanoscale magnetic sensing with an individual electronic spin in diamond". Nature. 455 (7213): 644–647. Bibcode:2008Natur.455..644M. doi:10.1038/nature07279. ISSN 1476-4687. PMID 18833275. Wikidata Q34844460.
- J. M. Taylor; P. Cappellaro; L. Childress; et al. (14 September 2008). "High-sensitivity diamond magnetometer with nanoscale resolution". Nature Physics. 4 (10): 810–816. arXiv:0805.1367. Bibcode:2008NatPh...4..810T. doi:10.1038/nphys1075. ISSN 1745-2473. Wikidata Q59424147. (erratum)
- P. Rabl; P. Cappellaro; M. V. Gurudev Dutt; L. Jiang; J. R. Maze; M. D. Lukin (8 January 2009). "Strong magnetic coupling between an electronic spin qubit and a mechanical resonator". Physical Review B. 79 (4). arXiv:0806.3606. Bibcode:2009PhRvB..79d1302R. doi:10.1103/physrevb.79.041302. ISSN 0163-1829. Wikidata Q59424138.
