= Natale Capellaro =

Italian mechanical designer

Natale Capellaro (22 December 1902 – 26 February 1977) was an Italian mechanical designer of mechanical calculators and honoris causa engineer, best remembered for the successful Olivetti mechanical calculators he designed, such as models Divisumma 14, Divisumma 24 and Tetractys.

== Career ==
Capellaro began his career in 1916 as an apprentice in the assembly line at Olivetti and was noticed for his mechanical ingenuity. From 1935, he collaborated with the calculator design department.

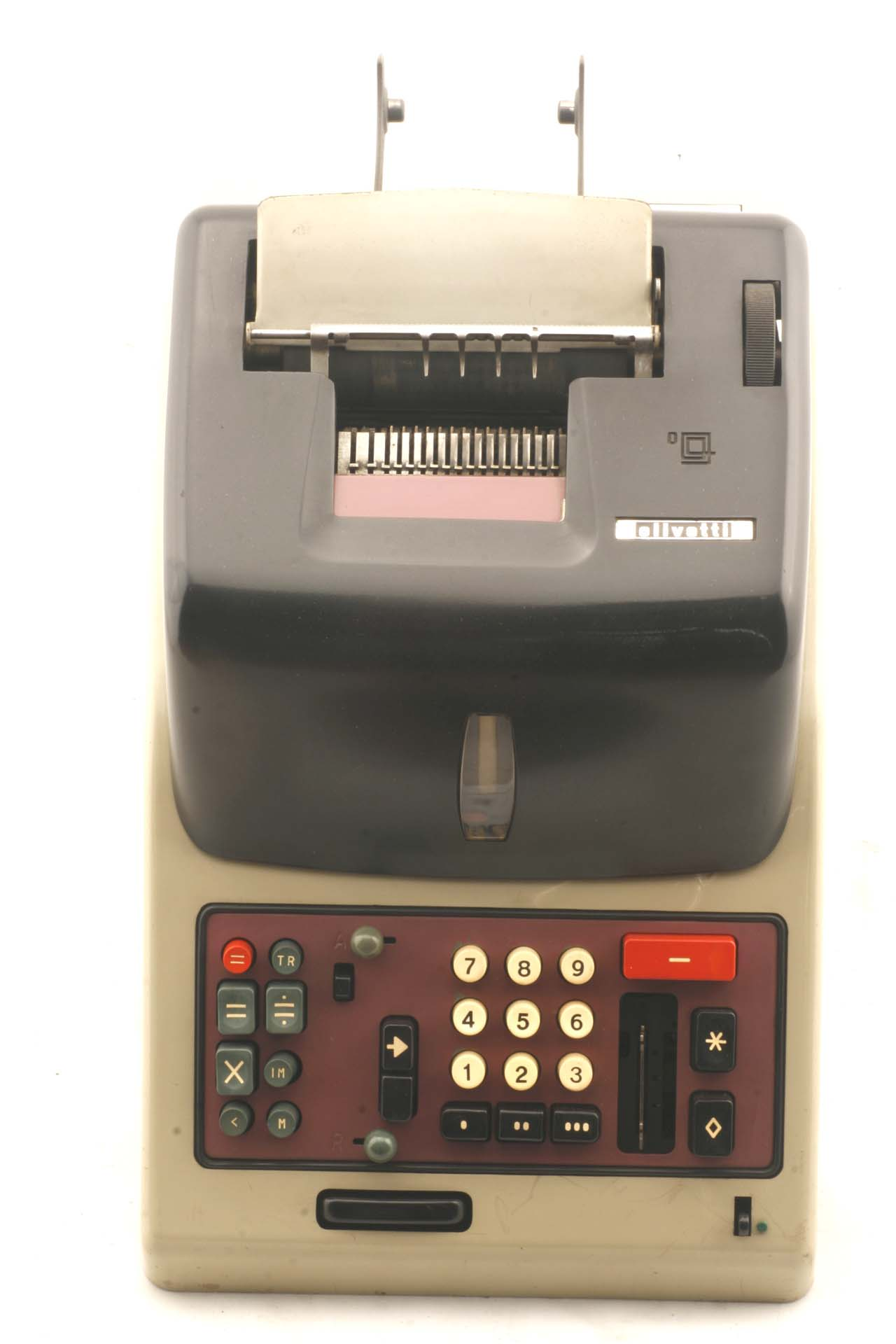
Olivetti Divisumma 24

Nominated head of calculator design in 1943, he directed the MC 14 project, a new line of electro-mechanical printing calculators replacing the early models by Olivetti. The first product launched in the new line was an adding machine (Elettrosumma 14) in 1946, then a multiplier machine (Multisumma 14) and a four-operation machine (Divisumma 14) were presented in 1947 and 1948 respectively, all with exterior aspect design by Marcello Nizzoli. The Divisumma 14 model was remarkable being the first mechanical calculator on the market with the ability of both dividing and computing a negative difference, and being the first ten-key four-operation machine with printing ability.

Beginning around 1950, Capellaro directed yet another successful project in the MC 24 line of calculators, with exterior aspect design again by Marcello Nizzoli. Launched in 1956, the Divisumma 24 model from this line sold over a million units over its lifetime, marking the golden age of Olivetti in the calculator market. An adding machine (Elettrosumma 24 Duplex), a multiplier machine (Multisumma 24), and an advanced calculator by the name Tetractys were also part of the line.

Capellaro was appointed General Technical Director at Olivetti in 1960. He moved to a position in the Executive Board in 1964, and his long-time main collaborator Teresio Gassino became director of research and development. In 1966, he resigned from Olivetti and worked as a consultant for the company until 1969.

== Death ==
Capellaro died in Turin on 26 February, 1977.

== Awards and honors ==
Capellaro was awarded an honorary degree in civil engineering from the University of Bari in 1962.

The Natale Capellaro Walkway, a footbridge across the Dora Baltea in Ivrea, was named in his honor in 2013.

== See also ==
- Mechanical calculator
- Olivetti Divisumma 14
- Olivetti Divisumma 24
- Olivetti Tetractys
