= Computing for All =

1980s French government plan to introduce computers to pupils

The Computing for All plan (Plan Informatique pour Tous – IPT) was a French government plan to introduce computers to the country's 11 million pupils. A second goal was to support national industry. It followed several introductory computer science programs in schools since 1971. The IPT plan was presented to the press on January 25, 1985 by Laurent Fabius, Prime Minister at the time. It aimed to set up, from the start of that school year, more than 120,000 machines in 50,000 schools and to train 110,000 teachers. Its estimated cost was 1.8 billion francs, including 1.5 billion for equipment. The plan was abandoned in 1989.

== Description ==
The selection of industry partners was entrusted to Gilbert Trigano, co-founder of Club Méditerranée, connected with French companies such as Exelvision, Léanord, SMT Goupil, Thomson, Bull, LogAbax, etc. This choice was political because its initiator, Jean-Jacques Servan-Schreiber, had indicated his preference for Macintosh, which would be specially modified for the plan. In return, Apple would install a manufacturing unit in France rather than in Ireland. The agreement negotiated at the highest level with Apple included a complete transfer of technology for an assembly plant with the highest global standards in terms of productivity. But instead Thomson, a nationalized company in difficulty, was chosen. The choice was made without a call for tenders.

The Computing for All plan popularized the Nanoréseau: a RS422-based computer network of modest size (up to 32 workstations, at 500 kbit/s) which included nano-machines (Thomson MO5, Thomson TO7/70 or Thomson MO5NR) and a PC compatible server (most often a Bull Micral 30, but Goupil 3, Léanord Sil'z 16, LogAbax Persona 1600 and CSEE 150 were also used). The PC was equipped with two 5¼ inch floppy disk drives, one used for the operating system (MS-DOS 2.11), the other with data for the Thomsons. The server also gave access to a shared printer.

A later version (NR33) allowed the use of a hard disk by installing the whole system; this allowed a much faster start. All the machines could be controlled remotely (the server in particular thanks to the NR-DOS system) and it was possible to recover a copy of any portion of their memory remotely by an operation called "station looting" (command CLONE in BASIC).

== Implementation ==
The Plan was entirely based on the Nanoréseau. Designed with the first 16-bit Bull Micral PCs as the network head, the Nanoréseau was a computer and educational success. Unfortunately, the choice of Thomson's MO5 8-bit terminals was problematic. Intended to develop the French IT sector based on the LSE language, Minitel and light pen, these solutions didn't become mainstream.

The plan allowed a first access to computers for many students and their teachers, a first approach to programming (in BASIC or in Logo) and the use of a computer with light pen (mouse was uncommon at the time). Yet teacher training was only 50 hours, and the focus was on programming rather than the use of software packages.

A few months after the plan was launched, only 10% of teachers used the computer in the classroom. The plan was considered a failure by the general inspectorate.

The abandon of computer production by Thomson in 1989 led to the end of the plan. Institutions wishing to continue teaching IT were faced with the obsolescence of equipment, and following the start of decentralization in France, modernization costs had to be supported by local authorities (totaling around 6 to 8 billion euros).
