= SMT Goupil =

IT company

- Company type: Public
- Industry: IT company
- Founded: 1979
- Founder: Claude Perdrillat
- Defunct: 1991
- Products: Computers

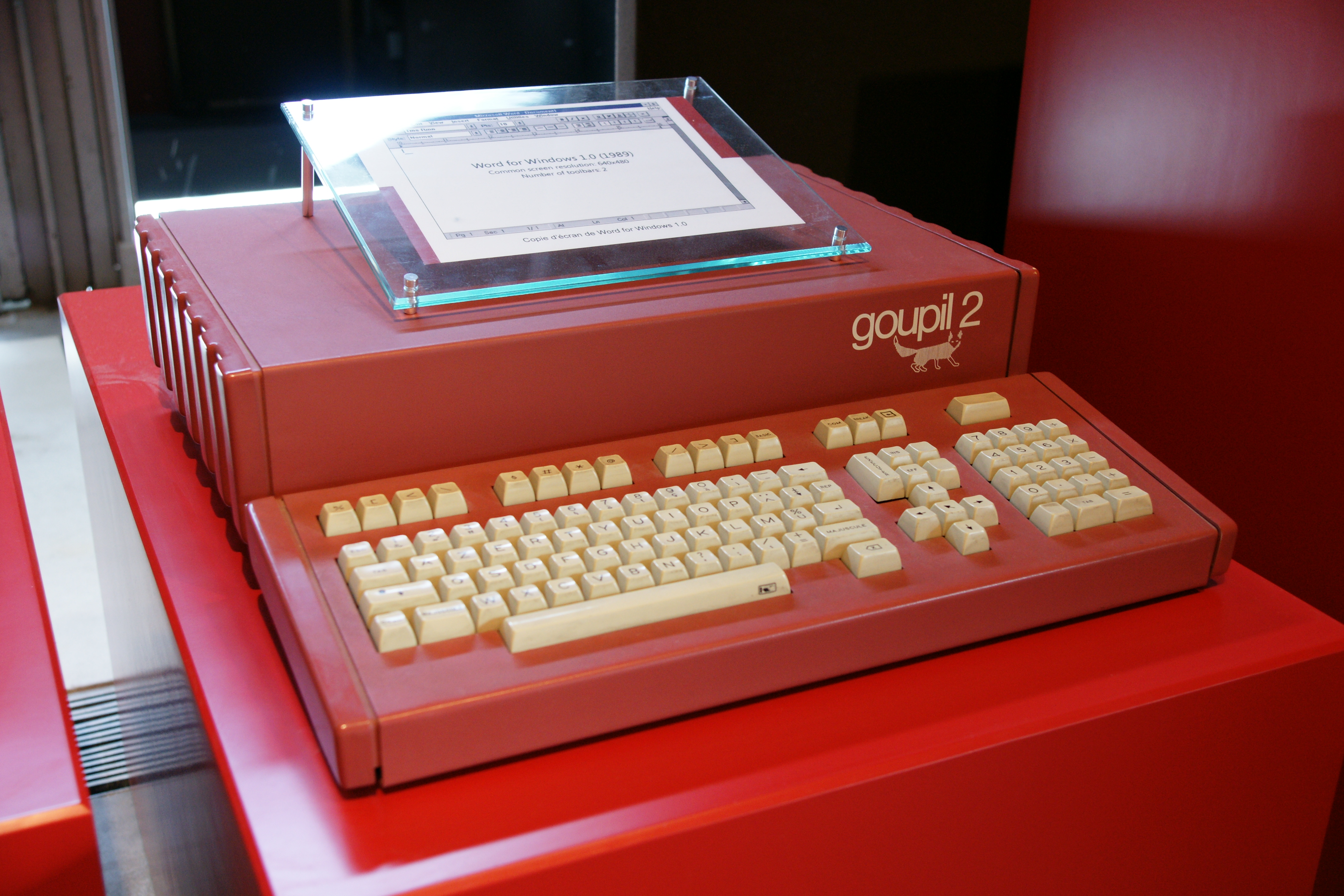
Goupil G2 computer

SMT Goupil (SMT - "Society of Microcomputing and Telecommunications") was a French IT company created in 1979 by Claude Perdrillat, previously a senior executive in the General Directorate of Telecommunications.

The company produced many microcomputers during the 1980s, mainly for French government agencies. This market collapsed at the end of the 1980s with the appearance of drastic budgetary restrictions in the French public sector and competition from more aggressive technological rivals like IBM, Apple and Olivetti.

Despite a significant debt of 40 million francs, the company went public in 1985, claiming to hold 15% of the French microcomputer market.

In January 1990, Goupil claimed to hold 18% of the market for professional microcomputers in France.

The company filed for bankruptcy in June 1991 with the accounting books revealing a debt of 700 million francs and a real turnover of 830 million francs in 1990.

== Models ==
The first Goupil G1 and G2 computers offered a promising architecture, with the integration of the Motorola 6808 processor coupled with the FLEX operating system. The machines had a sober and integrated design with particular colors - slate blue and red.

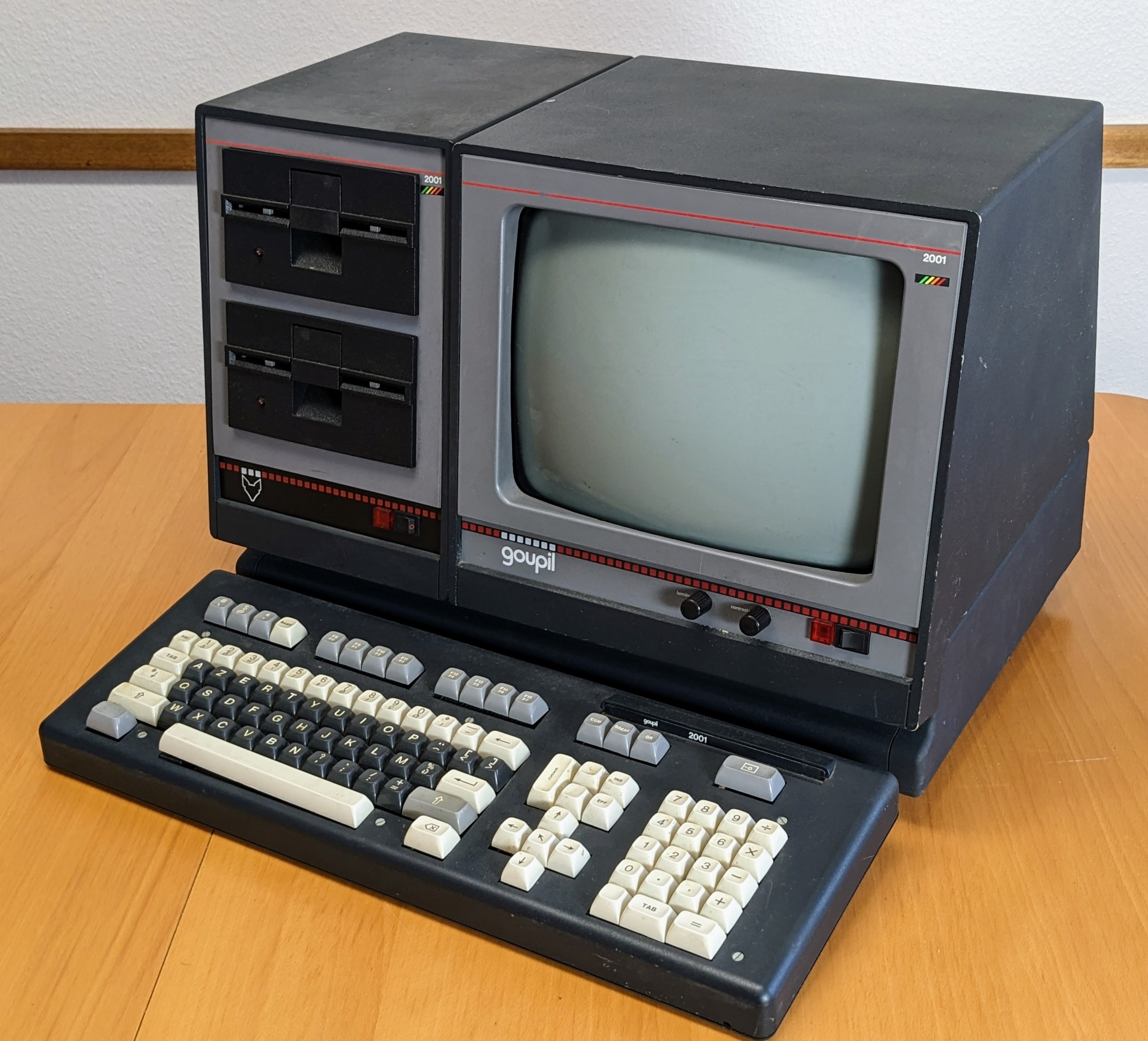
Goupil G3

The G3 extended compatibility in order to conquer foreign markets, by offering two processors at a time (selected at start-up by a switch) among three choices: the very common Motorola 6809, Zilog Z80 and Intel 8088. This allowed the Flex 9 and UniFLEX operating systems that came with the machine to run under MS-DOS, CP/M and UCSD Pascal. The dark gray case, designed by designer Roger Tallon, came with an integrated 12-inch monochrome monitor, two floppy disk drives, and a bay for 7 extension cards in Goupil format.

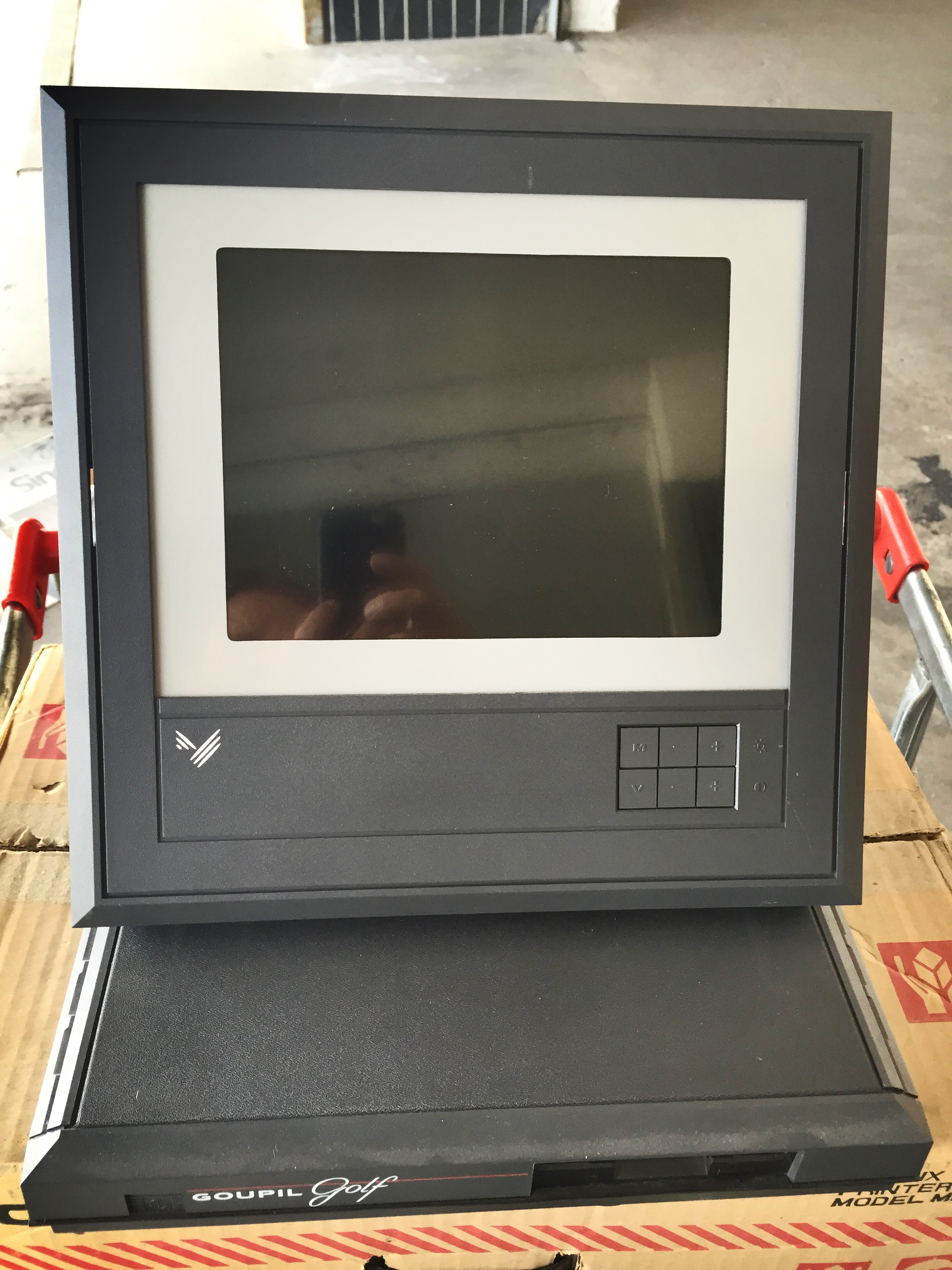
Goupil Golf, a PC-compatible portable computer

Further machines would seek IBM PC compatibility, as it became a standard regarding government equipment.

Below is a list of SMT Goupil computers by introduction date:

- 1979: Goupil G1, basic desktop computer
- 1981: Goupil G2, desktop computer with multiple configurations similar to those of Micral
- 1983: Goupil G3, Nanoréseau network machine, similar to Micral
- 1985: Goupil G4, PC-compatible desktop computer
- 1986: Goupil G40, desktop server version of the G4
- 1986: Goupil Club, PC Kaypro 2000 compatible laptop sold under license
- 1988: Goupil G5, PC-compatible desktop computer, several versions
- 1988: Goupil Golf, PC-compatible portable computer
- 1990: Goupil G50, tower server version of the G5
- 1990: Goupil G100, UNIX server initially designed by SFENA, characterized by input-output co-processors
- 1991: Goupil G6, PC-compatible desktop computer
- 1991: Goupil TOP, laptop with 10" backlit LCD screen under MS-DOS 5.0 (and Windows 3.1 installed later), offered in 2 versions: TOP (80286 @ 12.5 MHz) & TOP SX (80386 SX @ 20 MHz), both with 20 MB hard drive

== See also ==
- Computing for All, a French government plan to introduce computers to the country's pupils
