= Olivetti M19 =

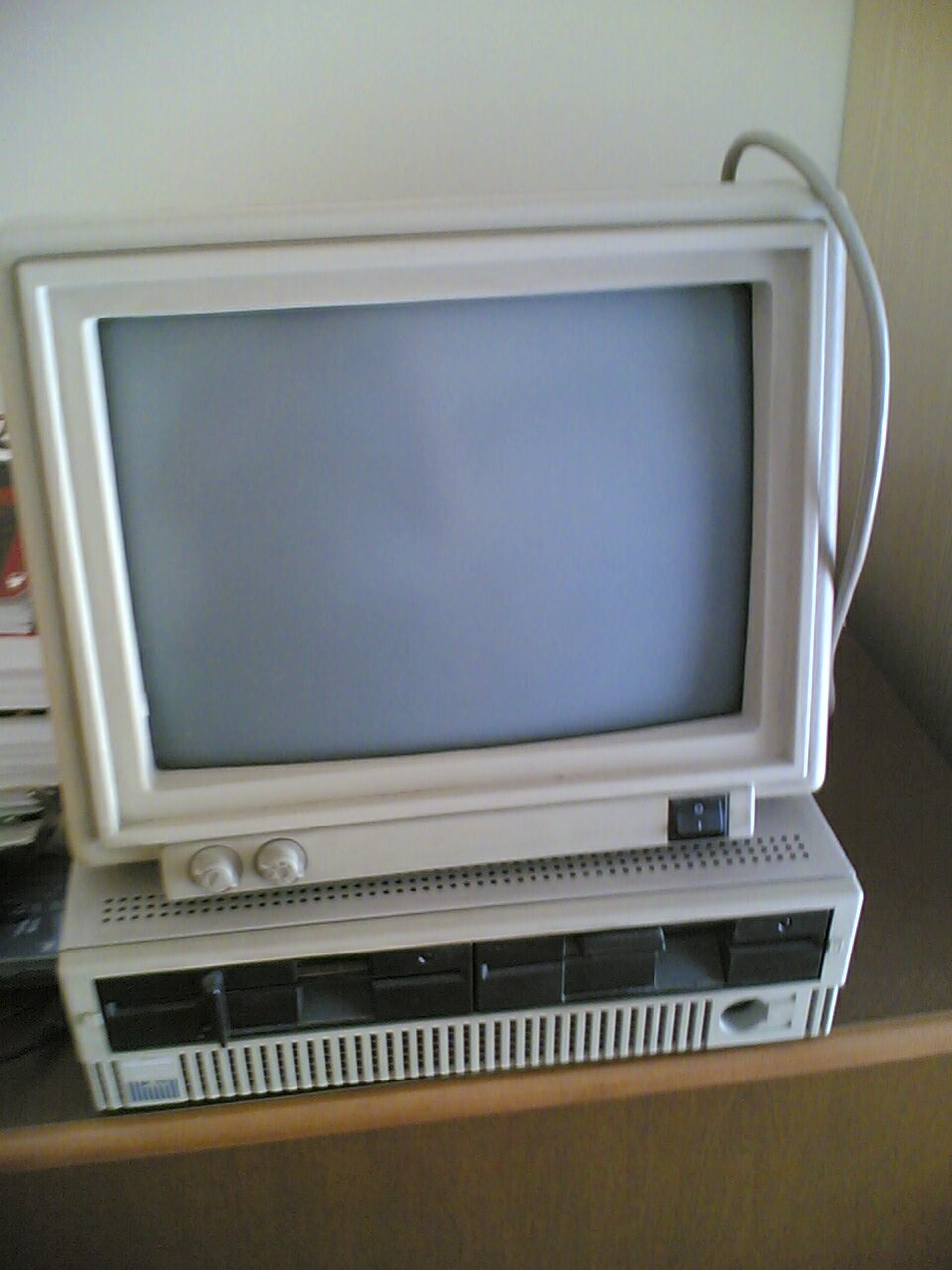
- Also known as: Acorn M19, LogAbax Persona 1300
- Manufacturer: Olivetti
- Type: Personal computer
- Released: 1986; 40 years ago
- Operating system: MS-DOS 2.11 / 3.1, Concurrent DOS and UCSD p-System
- CPU: 8088 or NEC V20 @ 4.77 or 8 MHz
- Memory: 256–640 KB
- Removable storage: Two floppy disk drives
- Display: 320x200 with 16 colors; 640x200 with 4 colors; 640x400 monochrome
- Graphics: CGA, Plantronics Colorplus
- Sound: Beeper
- Connectivity: RS-232 serial port, Centronics parallel port, expansion slots

The Olivetti M19 was a personal computer made in 1986 by the Italian company Olivetti. It has an 8088 at 4.77 or 8 MHz and 256–640 KB of RAM. The BIOS is Revision Diagnostics 3.71. In the UK, it was introduced as a product by Olivetti in apparent competition with Acorn Computers in the secondary education market, but was also rebadged as the Acorn M19, with additional software also available via Acorn. In France, it was available as the Persona 1300, sold by LogAbax.

== Specifications ==
The machine came with three operating systems: MS-DOS 2.11 / 3.1, Concurrent DOS and UCSD p-System. It was capable of displaying graphics in standard CGA or Plantronics Colorplus mode (320x200 pixel with 16 colors and 640x200 with 4 colors), as well as a special 640x400 monochrome mode with an appropriate monochrome monitor.

The M19 was sold with two floppy disk drives (360 KB format). An internal SCSI controller card and accompanying hard drive could be fitted instead of the second floppy drive, with a 10 MB model advertised by Olivetti, and a 20 MB model advertised for the Acorn M19.

Since the system unit was designed to occupy a smaller area than many contemporary PC-compatible systems, a smaller form of internal expansion card was used. Olivetti advertised a selection of miniature cards including a second serial port, a BSC/SNA communications board, the SCSI controller card, and local area network cards. Acorn explicitly advertised Econet connectivity, whereas Olivetti advertised support for 10 NET connectivity, its own LAN technology, as well as "LAN economica", ostensibly Acorn's Econet.

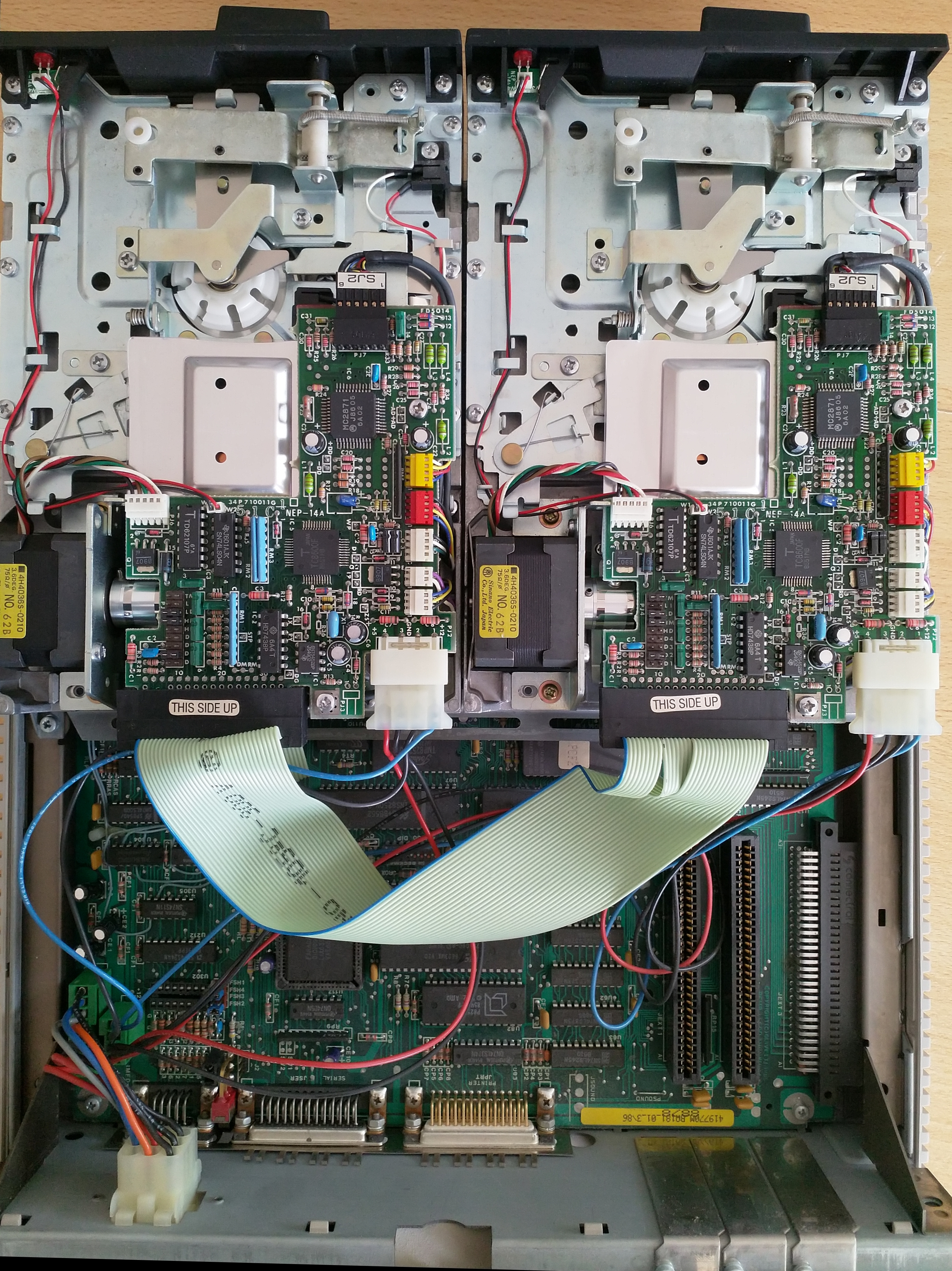
Inside of an Olivetti M19, with the two internal slots visible at the bottom right.

With only two internal expansion slots available, Olivetti incorporated various standard interfaces, specifically a serial port and Centronics parallel port together with the video circuitry and connectors, onto the motherboard itself, avoiding the need to dedicate up to three slots to provide such functionality. Other expansion and upgrade options included a mouse interface, television adapter for SCART-equipped televisions, and a "dual speed kit" offering a 8088 CPU with an operating frequency of 4.77 MHz or 8 MHz selectable by the user.

Paul Maynes, a technician at HBH Computers (one of Olivetti's dealerships in Durban) designed, and SA Signals Manufacturing (also of Durban) produced a bus extension card with a 90-degree bend (purportedly a world-first) that could accommodate a Seagate hard drive controller card. This allowed the second floppy drive to be removed and a 20 MB (later 40 MB) full-height hard drive installed in its place.

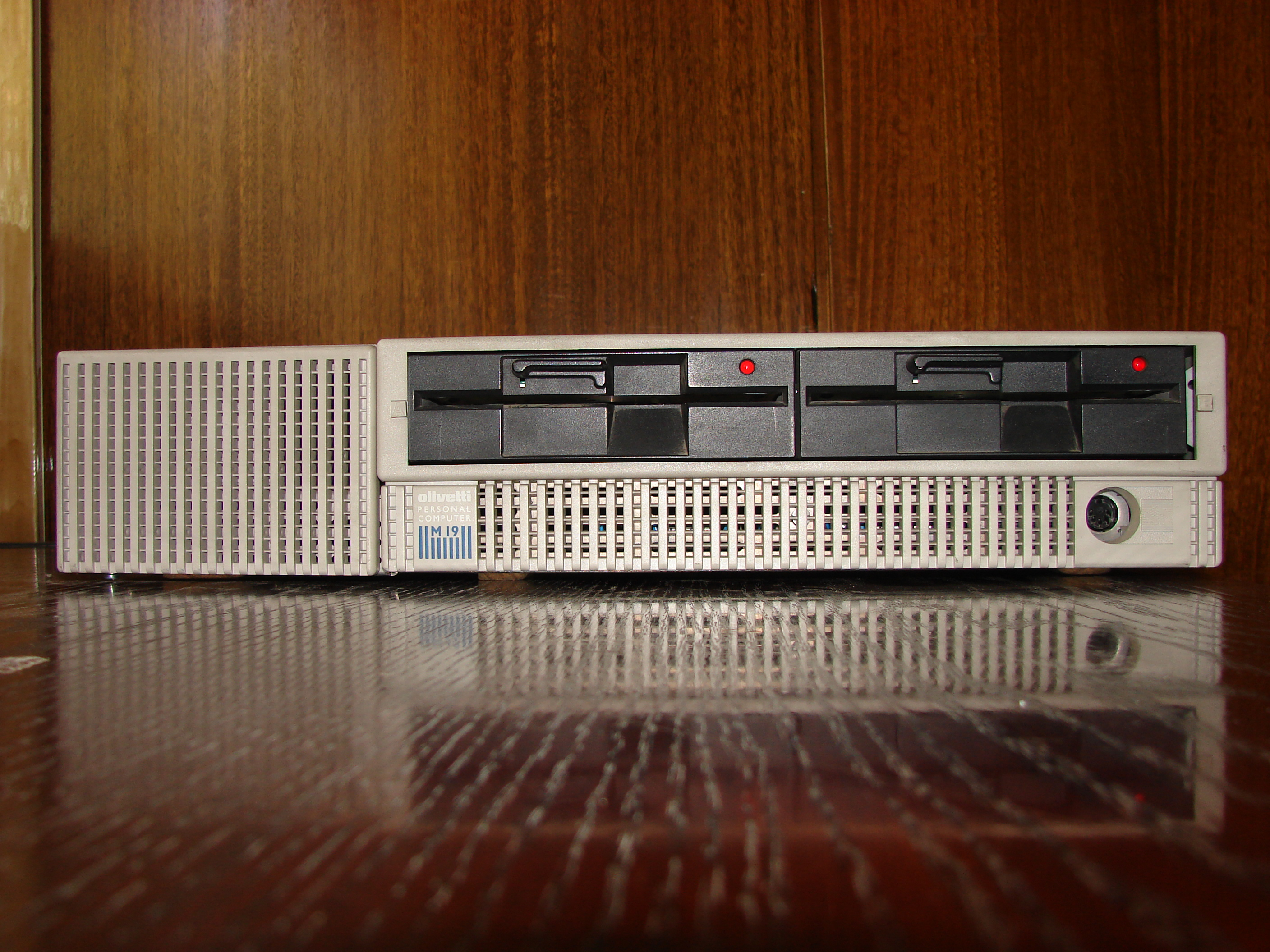
Front view Olivetti M19 personal computer with expansion box (left)

To use a standard "full size" expansion card, an external expansion box could be attached to the left-hand side of the computer by four machine screws. This add-on was available in two different versions, one of which being able to provide power to the system in a colour monitor configuration, and this powered variant was bundled with Acorn's colour models. In a monochrome configuration using Olivetti's monitor, the system power was provided by the monitor, eliminating the need for a power supply and cooling fans inside the compact case of the machine.

== M19 based word processors ==
In 1987 Olivetti introduced the word processor systems ETV 260 and ETV 500 based on the M19. While the ETV 500 was just a M19 accelerated to 8 MHz and equipped with two 3.5 inch 720 KB floppy drives, which used optionally an Olivetti ET series typewriter (usually a ET 112 or ET 116) as a serial-attached keyboard and daisy wheel printer, the ETV 260 was a fully-integrated word processor system with the M19 / ETV 500 accelerated mainboard mounted into a high speed 35 cps (characters per second) daisy wheel typewriter chassis, equipped with two 720 KB floppy drives or a single floppy drives plus an integrated 20 MB SCSI or MFM hard disk.

Both systems, ETV 260 and ETV 500, ran MS-DOS 3 and booted directly into Olivetti's own word processor software SWS - Secretary's Work Station, which could be easy used by people already familiar with Olivetti's ET series typewriters and older CP/M based ETV word processor systems (like the ETV 240, 250 or 350).

== Gallery ==
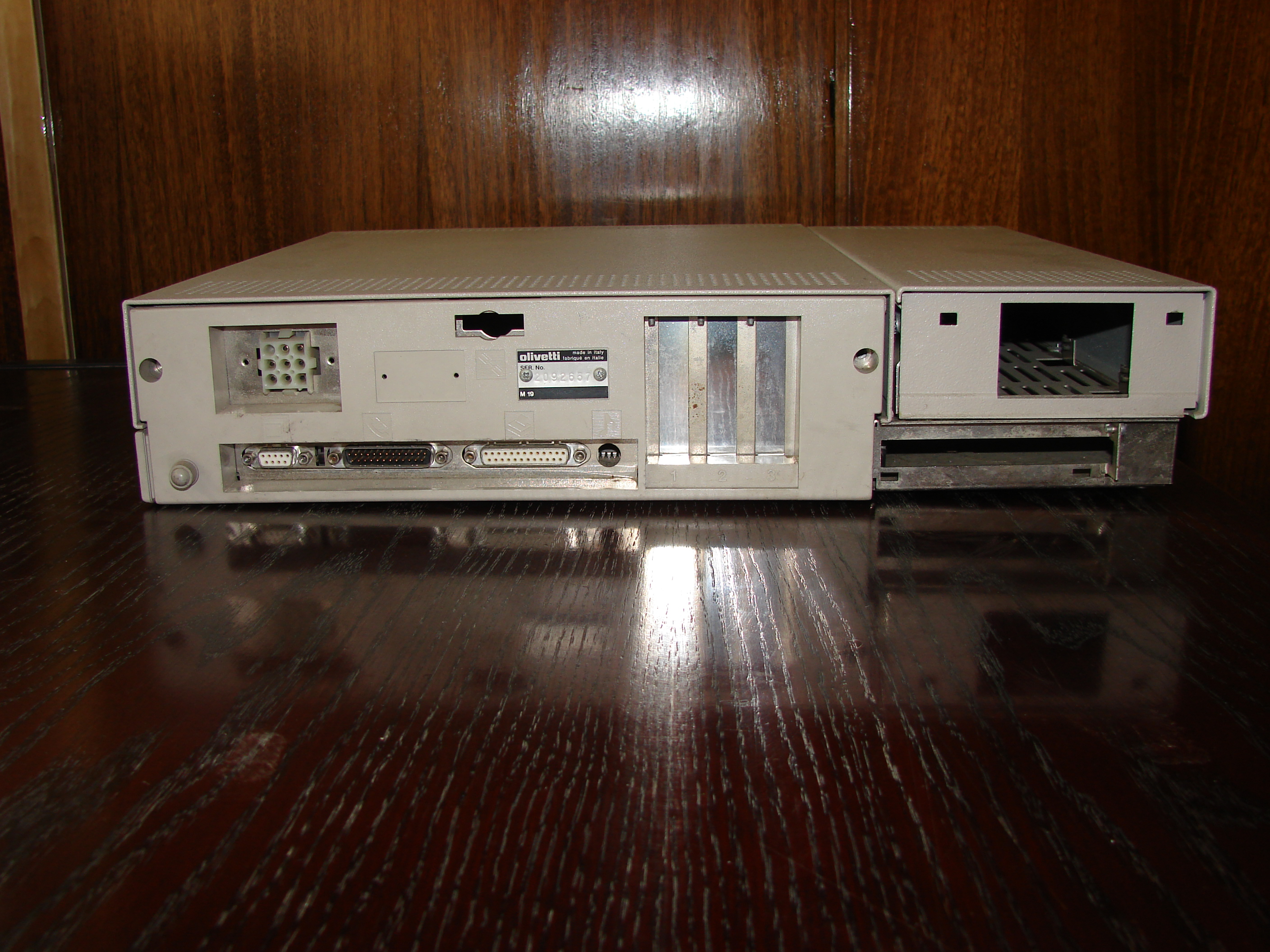
Olivetti M19 rear view

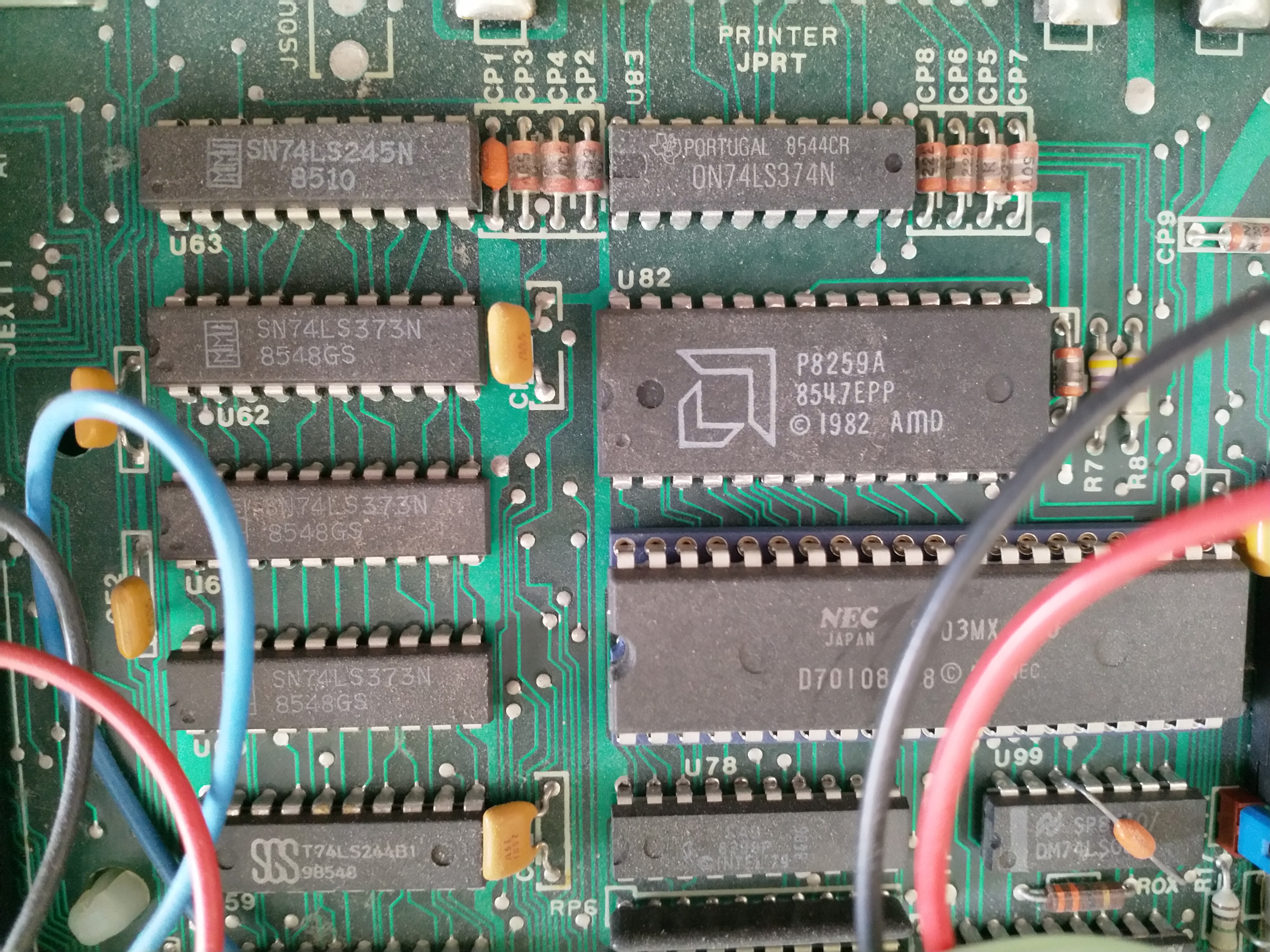
Mainboard with AMD P8259A Programmable Interrupt Controller and NEC V20 (μPD70108) main processor (instead of an Intel 8088) visible

== See also ==
- Olivetti M24
- Olivetti video typewriters
- Plantronics Colorplus
