= Olivetti M20 =

Z8000 based computer designed by Italian company Olivetti

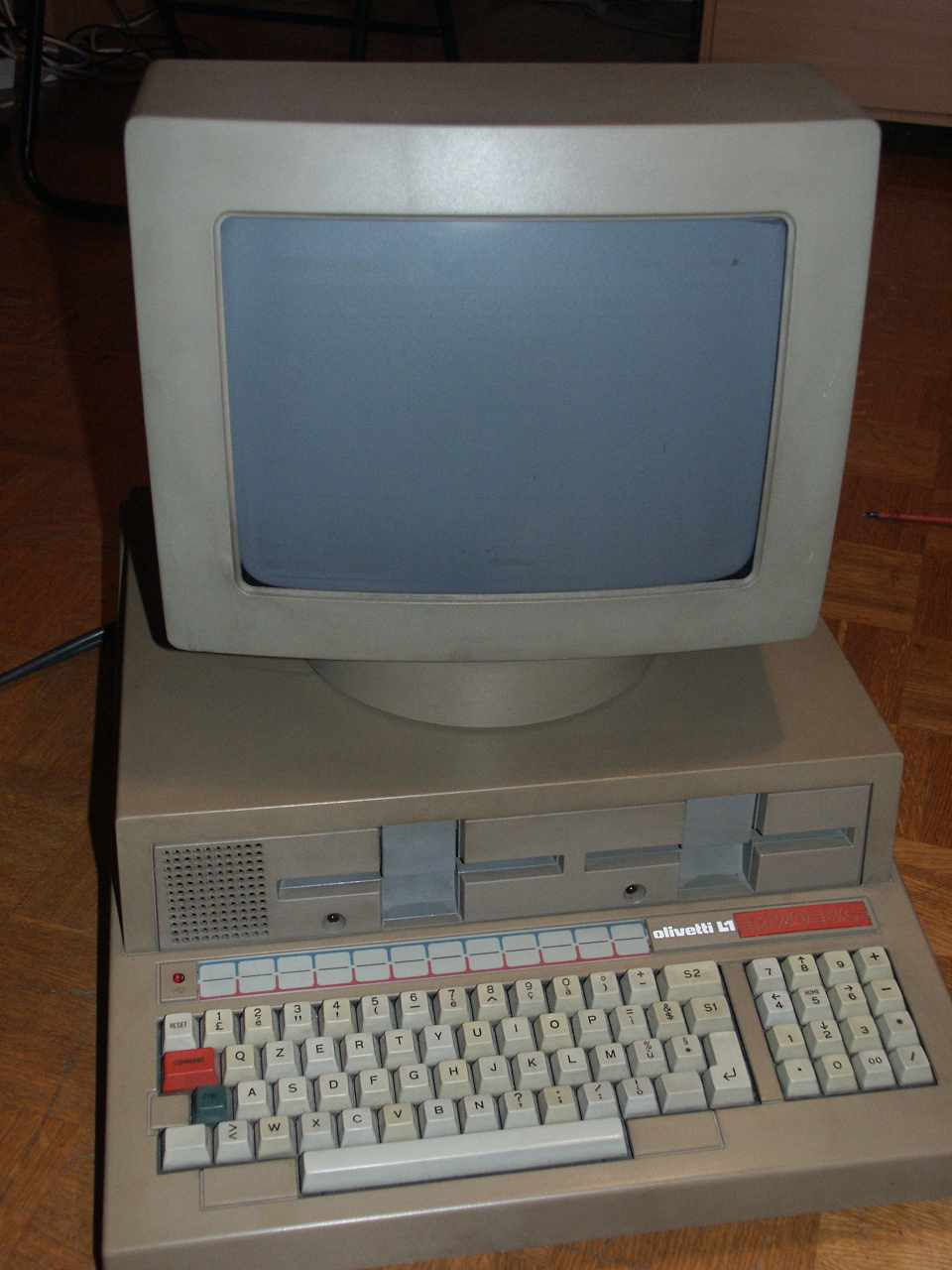
- Manufacturer: Olivetti
- Type: Personal computer
- Released: 1982; 44 years ago
- Discontinued: 1984; 42 years ago
- Operating system: PCOS
- CPU: Zilog Z8001 @ 4 MHz
- Memory: 128 KB (expandable to 512 KB)
- Graphics: 512×256; 8 colors with 64 KB expansion boards, 4 colors with 32 KB expansion board. 80×25 or 64×16 characters
- Successor: Olivetti M24

The Olivetti M20 is a Zilog Z8000 based computer designed and released by Olivetti in 1982. Although it offered good performance, it suffered from a lack of software due to its use of the Z8000 processor and custom operating system, PCOS. The company introduced the IBM PC compatible Olivetti M24 in 1983 and the M20 line was phased out.

== History ==
System design began in 1979 in Cupertino, California at Olivetti's Advanced Technology Center. When announced on March 31, 1982, it was probably the first 16-bit personal computer in Europe with an expected price range of US$3,000-6,000.

InfoWorld magazine saw the M20 as an "answer to Tandy's Model 16, the IBM Personal Computer and the Apple III"; Olivetti itself compared its computer to the IBM PC, Sirius Victor, Commodore 8000 and Apple II in television advertising.

Although the computer was well received, observers immediately pointed out the lack of CP/M. InfoWorld quoted one as saying that "it reflects the thinking of 1980". M20's use of a non-standard OS (Olivetti's proprietary PCOS) and CPU (Zilog Z8001) proved to be its most serious limitations. The first major software package was a word processor by SofSys called Executive Secretary, followed later by another word processor, OliWord, and business software, Olibiz. There was also Microsoft BASIC 5.2 with full support for the hardware's features.

To alleviate a lack of applications, Olivetti sold a CP/M emulator for US$300 and distributed certain CP/M software packages (dBase II and SuperCalc) for their computer. Olivetti later introduced the "Alternate Processor Board" (APB 1086), based on an 8 MHz Intel 8086 CPU for compatibility with MS-DOS and CP/M-86 software.

In January 1984, Olivetti introduced a new IBM PC-compatible computer, the Olivetti M24, running MS-DOS as a "complement" to the Olivetti M20.

Olivetti sold around 50,000 M20 computers in the first year of production. Only a few games were released for the system.

== Features ==
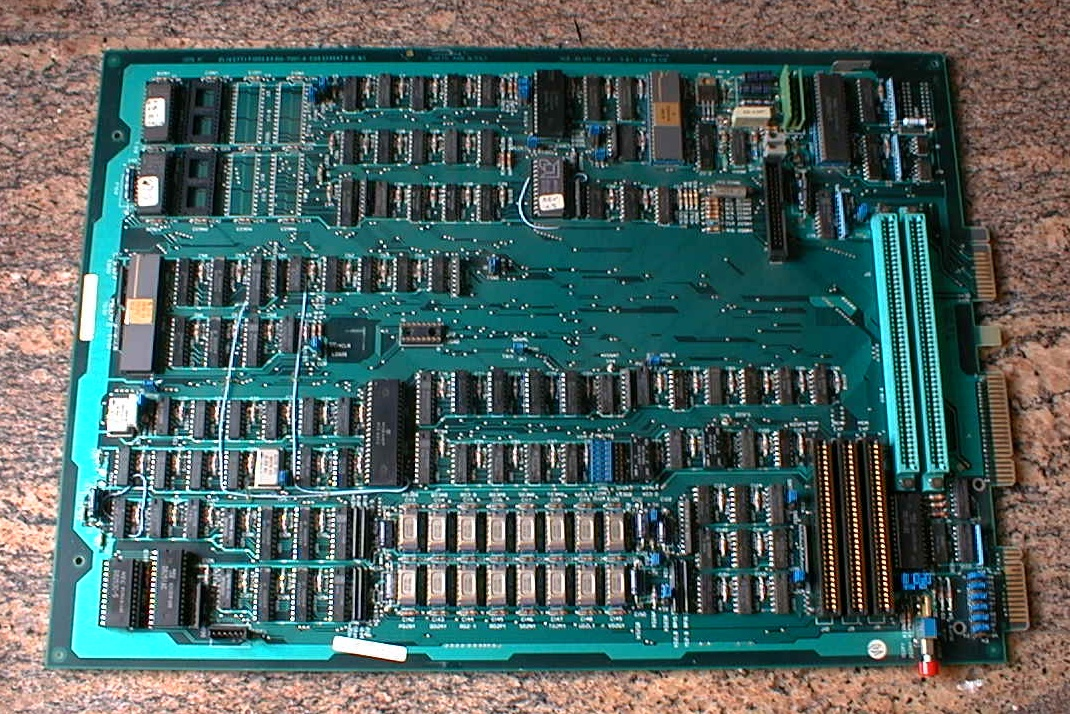
Olivetti M20 motherboard

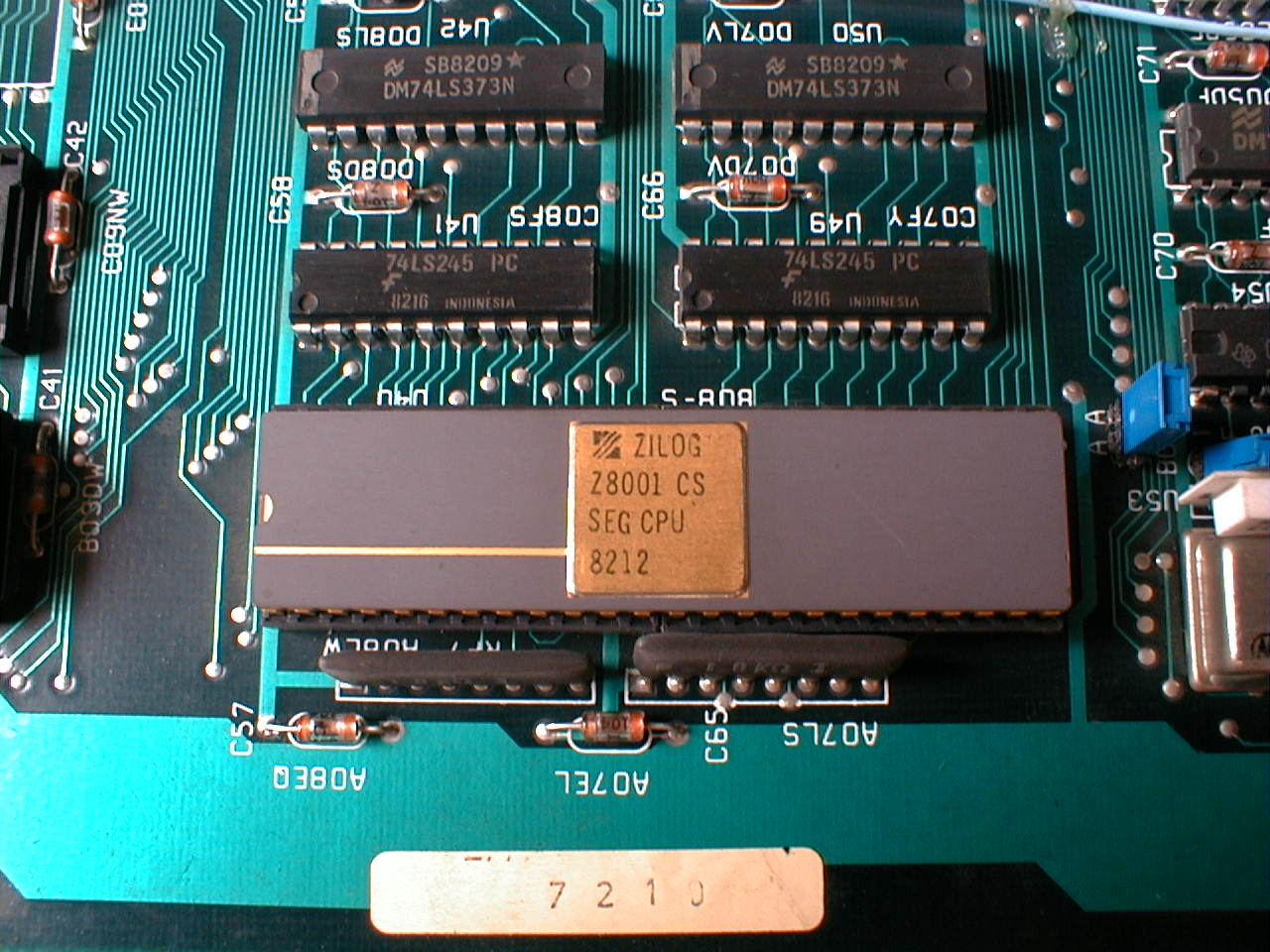
Zilog 8001 on the motherboard of an Olivetti M20 computer

M20 uses Zilog Z8001 4 MHz CPU and 128 KB RAM, which can be expanded up to 512 KB by three 128 KB memory boards. Keyboard, motherboard and disk drives are contained in all-in-one unit with separate monitor. The computer has also parallel (IEEE-488) and serial port (RS-232-C). Standard configuration (Note: Announced price for basic configuration with only one 320 KB floppy disk drive was US$2,965. Price of M20 including monitor, two 320 KB floppy disk drives, PCOS and BASIC was NZ$6,850 in June 1983. Dual 640 KB floppy disk drives were available for additional NZ$2,200, 32 KB memory expansion for NZ$430 and PR 1450 printer for NZ$2,450. Total system price with hard drive could reach NZ$17,000. Software packgages Olibiz and OliWord cost both around NZ$400. Exchange rate in June 1983 was US$0.6569 for NZ$1.) includes two 5 1/4-inch 320 KB floppy disk drives (286 KB formatted capacity). Optional were 160 KB or 640 KB (compatible with 320 KB disks) drives or 5 1/4-inch hard disk in place of one of the floppy disk drives (9.2 MB formatted capacity).

Motherboard has two expansion slots intended for the hard disk controller board, additional parallel interface, twin serial interface or Corvus Omninet LAN card. This slot is also used by the APB 1086 CPU card.

M20 provides 512 × 256 display resolution on 12-inch monochrome or color monitor. With memory expanded by two 32 KB memory boards, the computer can display 8 colors. When using only one additional memory board, only 4 colors form 8 color palette are available. All graphics is pixel-generated (there is no specific text mode), text characters use resolution 64 characters per 16 rows (or 80 characters per 25 rows).

Keyboard lacks Delete, Tab ↹ and ← Backspace keys - their function can be mapped on S1 or s2 special keys by the "Change Key" system utility. Instead of standard function keys, user defined special functions are invoked by pressing orange-colored ⌘ Command or light-blue-colored Control key along with another key (creates 24 user-definable function keys). Numeric keypad serves also as cursor controls.

== PCOS ==
PCOS (Professional Computer Operating System) is a single-user, single-tasking operating system. It was used on the Olivetti M20 and L1 computers. The first version (PCOS 1.0) supports 14 characters long filenames, with no directories and a limit of 192 files per disk (called volume). PCOS requires significant part of the main memory. Operating system with BASIC interpreter takes 64 KB RAM, another 16 KB are reserved for screen output and user is left with only around 40 KB RAM on unexpanded machine. Version 2.0 supports dynamic memory allocation alleviating segmented memory limitations of the Z8000 CPU. PCOS can protect by password volumes (disks), individual files and BASIC programs (against listing/editing/copying). Standard OS configuration includes BASIC interpreter, other programming languages (Assembler and PASCAL) are optional.

Example PCOS commands:

- vformat - formats a volume
- vrename - changes the name of a volume
- vpass - changes the volume password
- vlist - file list
- vquick - quick file list
- vcopy - volume copy
- fcopy - file copy
- flist - display a text file contents
- basic - run the BASIC interpreter
- dconfig - system configuration
- slanguage - system regional settings

== Reception ==
BYTE in June 1983 described M20 as "the maverick of the second-generation personal computers", noting the keyboard's lack of function keys and other unusual aspects, the Z8000 CPU, and proprietary operating system. While approving of the "extraordinary" graphics, the magazine cautioned that "its nonstandard hardware/software environment represents the most serious limitation to the M20's prospective sales", concluding that it was an "elegant, but slightly puzzling, import".
