= Olivetti M24 =

Computer sold by Olivetti in 1983 using the Intel 8086 CPU

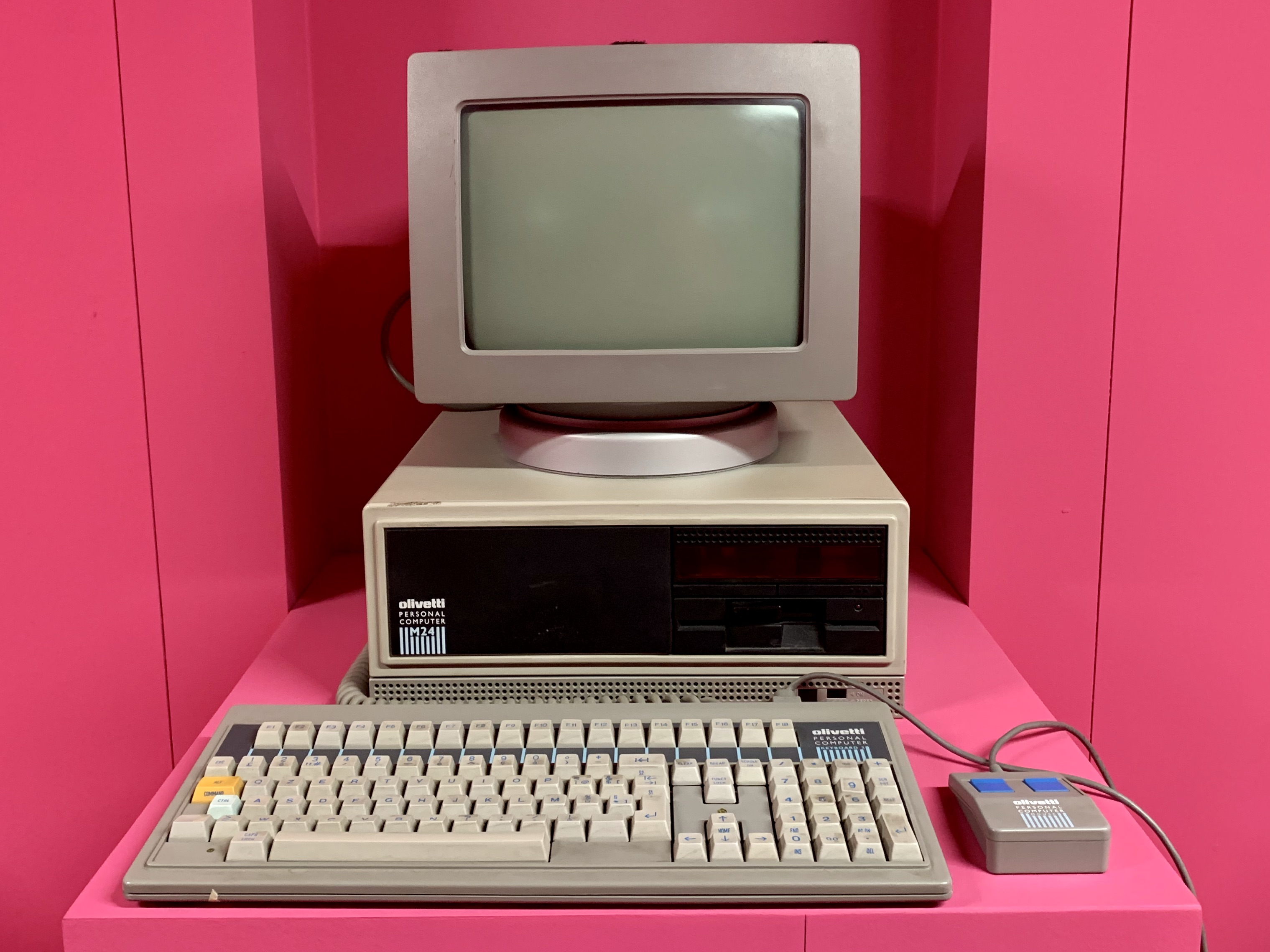
- Original Olivetti M24
- Also known as: LogAbax Persona 1600, AT&T PC 6300, PC 6300 Plus, PC 6310, PC 6312, Xerox 6060, M24 SP
- Manufacturer: Olivetti
- Type: Personal computer
- Released: 1983; 43 years ago
- Discontinued: 1989
- Operating system: MS-DOS 2.1, CP/M-86, UCSD-P, PCOS, Xenix, UNIX System V (on 6300 Plus)
- CPU: Intel 8086; Intel 80286 (PC 6300 Plus, PC 6310, PC 6312) @ 8 MHz; 10 MHz (M24 SP); 6 MHz (PC 6300 Plus); 8 MHz (PC 6310); 12 MHz (PC 6312)
- Memory: 128 KB or 256 KB (expandable to 640 KB)
- Storage: 20 MB hard disk (Xerox 6060)
- Removable storage: floppy disk
- Display: 320 x 200, 640 x 200, 640 x 400 with up to 16 colors; 512 x 256 with up to 8 colors
- Graphics: Video Enhanced Adapter EGC 2413, Motorola 6845 (Enhanced CGA-compatible video card)
- Sound: Beeper
- Successor: Olivetti M240, Olivetti M28

The Olivetti M24 is a computer that was sold by Olivetti in 1983 using the Intel 8086 CPU.

The system was sold in the United States under its original name by Docutel/Olivetti of Dallas. AT&T and Xerox bought rights to rebadge the system as the AT&T PC 6300 and the Xerox 6060 series, respectively. (AT&T owned 25% of Olivetti around this time.) The AT&T 6300, launched in June 1984, was AT&T's first attempt to compete in the PC compatible market.

It was also available in France as the PERSONA 1600, built by LogAbax.

== Versions ==
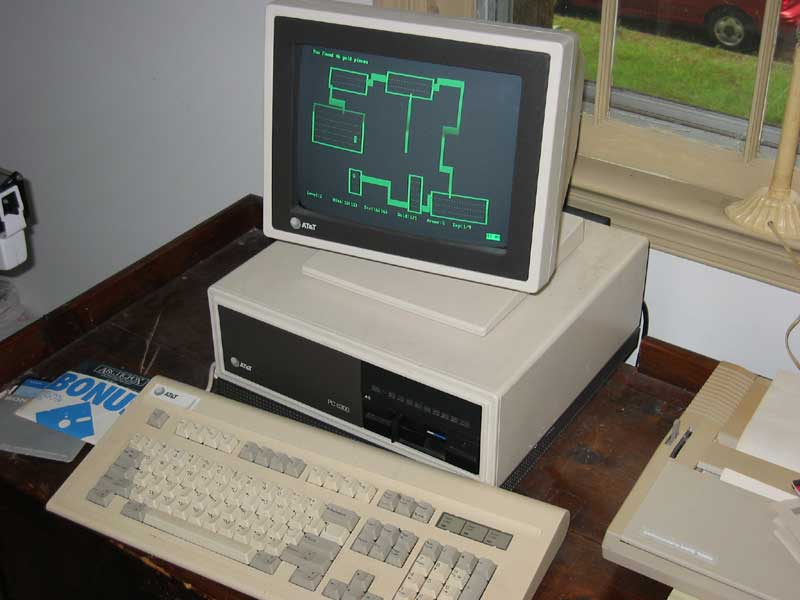
An AT&T 6300, circa 1996, displaying the game Rogue

The initial 1984 US version named AT&T 6300 came with either one or two 360 KB 5.25" floppy drives; a hard disk was not offered.

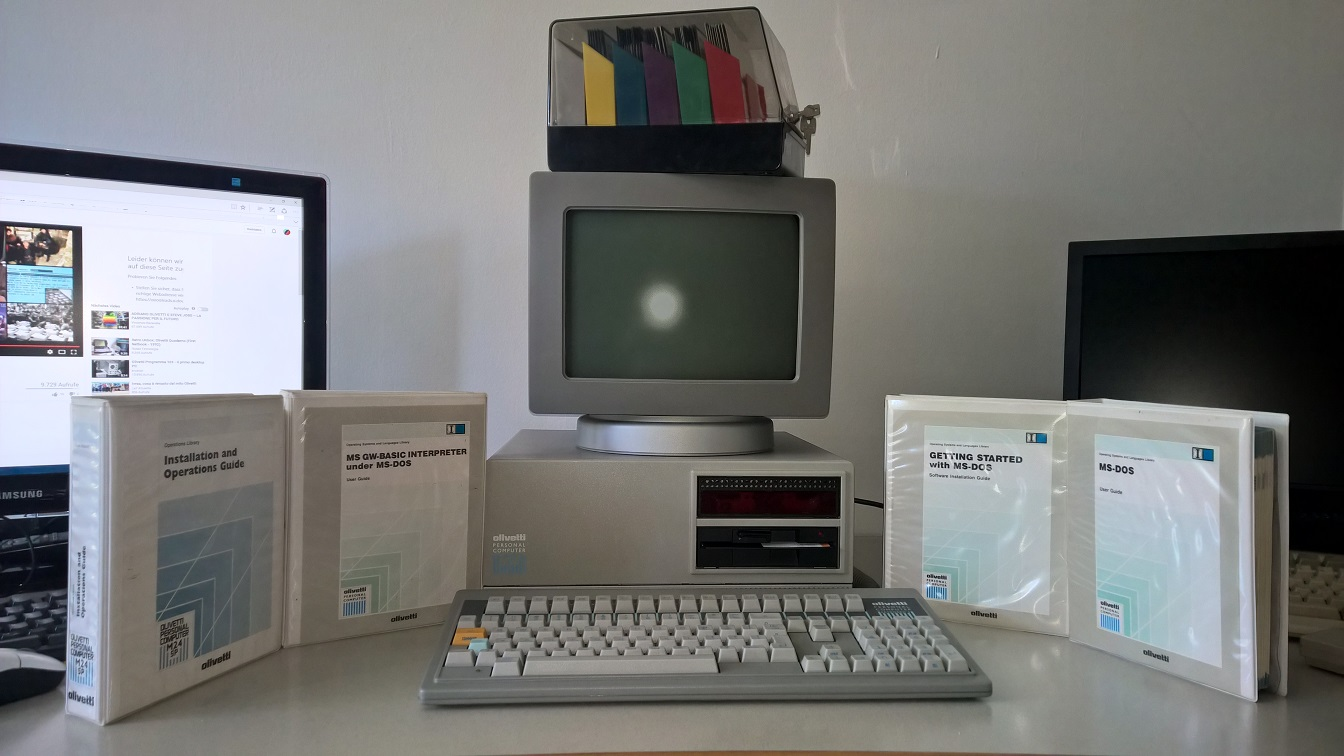
Olivetti M24SP with manuals

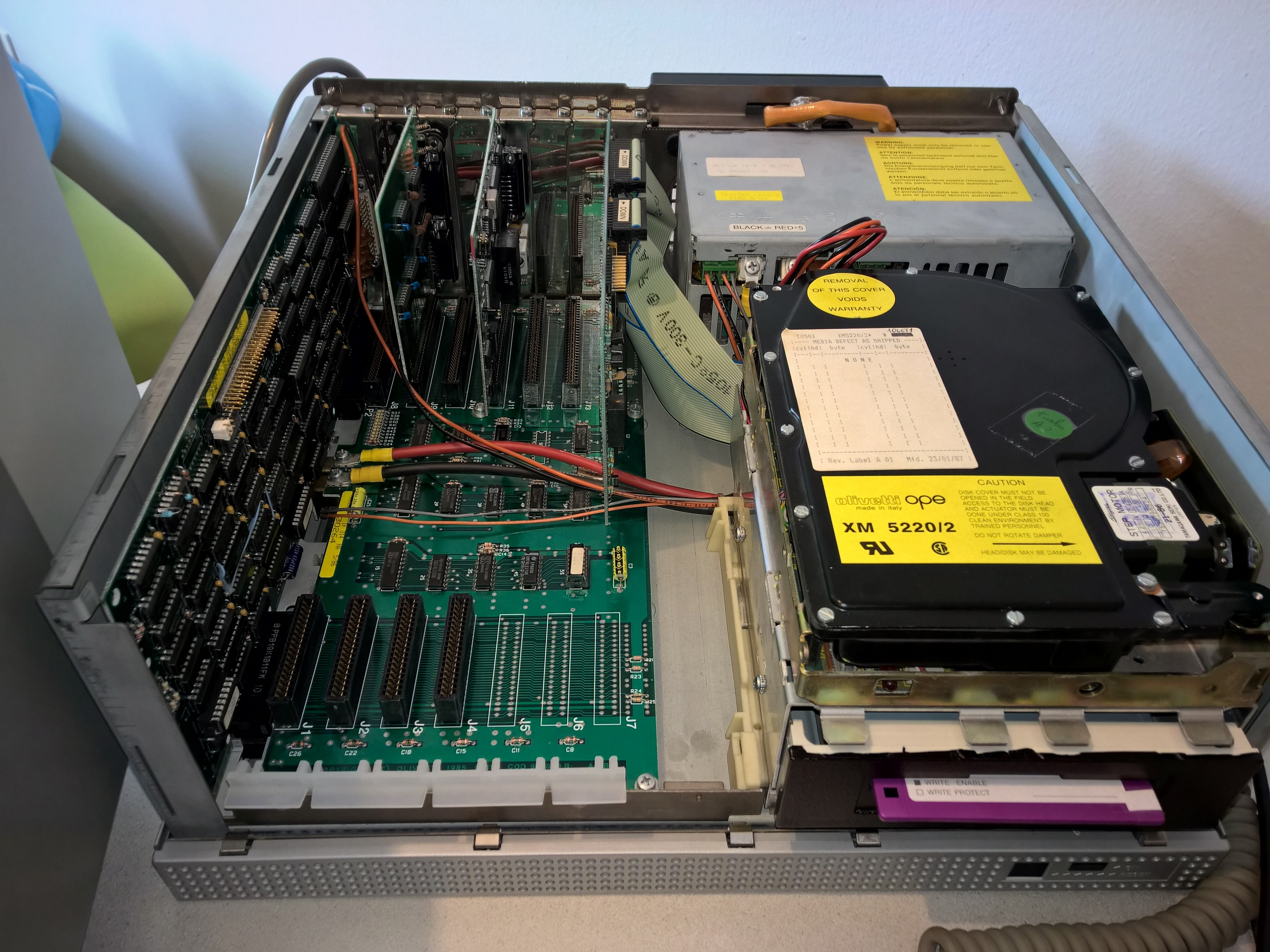
Olivetti M24SP I/O Board

In Europe, Olivetti launched a 10 MHz version: the Olivetti M24 SP, announced in November 1985, a contender for the title of "highest clocked 8086 computer" as its processor was the fastest grade of 8086-2, rated for a maximum speed of exactly the same 10 MHz. To support this, the motherboard now featured a switchable 24/30 MHz master crystal, still divided by 3 to produce the 33% duty CPU clock, with an additional 4 MHz crystal to maintain that clock signal for peripherals that required it, and the video board receiving its own 24 MHz crystal to maintain the same image size and scan frequencies at both processor speeds.

In October 1985, AT&T launched the 6300 Plus that used a 6 MHz 286 microprocessor in the same case as the 6300. Prior to release, this machine had been referred to as the 8300 and codenamed "Safari 5" (PC 7300 was "Safari 4"). On the hardware level, this machine was criticized by an InfoWorld reviewer for being incompatible with AT cards. On the other hand, AT&T sold a package of the 6300 Plus bundled with Simultask, which ran MS-DOS and UNIX System V simultaneously, at a cost—with all software licenses included—on par with the IBM PC/AT with MS-DOS alone. A review in PC Magazine declared that AT&T's 6300 Plus was "flat out the better machine" compared to the IBM PC/AT.

The version of Simultask included with the 6300 Plus was based on Locus Computing Corporation's Merge software. In order to allow MS-DOS applications to run as "concurrent UNIX tasks", a non-standard hardware unit known as OS Merge was provided, allowing DOS applications to "think" that they had "complete control over the system" and offering "almost complete compatibility with IBM PC software", with a reported performance penalty when running applications such as Microsoft Flight Simulator of around 15 percent. Such additional hardware was necessary to support these virtualisation features due to the limitations of the 80286. The PC 6300 Plus shipped with MS-DOS in 1985 though, because its Unix System V distribution would not be ready until the end of March 1986. The 6300 Plus did not sell as well as the original 6300. Forrester Research estimated in December 1986 that AT&T's financial losses in PC market were about $600M for the year.

In 1986, AT&T began offering 3.5" 720 KB floppies and 20 MB hard disks. The Xerox 6060 came standard with a single 360 KB 5.25" drive and a 20 MB hard drive. An Iomega Bernoulli 10/10 removable cartridge drive was also offered as a factory option, as well as a "small expansion" sidecar hosting a hard drive for users who found themselves with no internal space left between floppies and expansion cards.

After the 6300 Plus, AT&T announced that it was turning over both production and development of its PC products to Olivetti. In 1987, AT&T offered a true AT-based 286, their 6310— a rebadge of Olivetti M28. Equipped with a one-wait state 8 MHz processor, it was a pretty slow machine for its class, even slower than the IBM XT 286. Simultask was also an option for the 6310. The later-released 6312 addressed the speed problem with a 12-MHz CPU. After the announcement of the 6310, in April 1987, AT&T announced price cuts across its 6300 PC product line, with the 6300 Plus discounted by 27-38%, while the original 6300 was discounted by 17-23% (depending on configuration).

6300s made in 1986-1987 have BIOS Version 1.43 which added proper support for 3.5" floppies and fixed a number of bugs. As with all contemporary systems, a BIOS upgrade required a physical chip replacement, which AT&T provided for $35.

== Features ==
The M24 was designed to be highly compatible with IBM PC. One of its characteristics was the use of the more powerful 8.0 MHz Intel 8086 CPU rather than the 4.77 MHz Intel 8088 used in IBM's own PC XT, configured for "maximum mode" that allowed direct installation of an 8087 math co-processor (also at 8 MHz) to the motherboard. The CPU clock, along with most others in the machine (other than the serial baud rate generator and an IBM-standard 14.3 MHz crystal used on the expansion board), was divided down from a 24.0 MHz master crystal, with the CPU timing in particular using an Intel 8284 clock generator, as per the IBM PC, to produce the 33% duty cycle pulse wave required by the 8086.

The system was designed "split-level", with the motherboard screwed onto the underside of the computer case and connected to the ISA bus backplane in the top section of the case via the video card which, rather than occupying an ISA slot, has two female edge connectors and plugs onto the ends of both the motherboard and the backplane, doubling as a bridge between them. The M24 has seven 8-bit ISA slots, as were standard for its time, but a number of slots (exact figure seeming to vary between one and at least four across extant machines) have proprietary second connectors to accept Olivetti-specific 16-bit cards. The machine had the bad luck of launching just a few months before the IBM PC/AT, which introduced the entirely different 16-bit connector and signalling standard extension to the PC bus now known simply as "ISA", and so ended up featuring slots incompatible on all three fronts of physical configuration, complement and arrangement of signals, and data transfer rate, significantly restricting the number of compatible 16-bit cards produced for it.

=== CGA compatible video card ===
The M24/6300 had an unusual enhanced 32 KB CGA-compatible video card (Video Enhanced Adapter - EGC 2413) which, in addition to standard 200-line CGA graphics modes (automatically line doubled, transparent to software, with text modes also using 400 scanlines with higher quality 8×16 pixel fonts, or even 16×16 in 40-column mode with an expansion ROM), also supported an additional 640×400 pixel graphics mode, as well as a poorly documented 512×256 mode for compatibility with the earlier M20 model (in conjunction with a Z8000-based emulator card that included a necessary additional clock source). All modes were non-interlaced, albeit running at a then-common 50 Hz Vsync rate, and required the dedicated OEM 26.3 kHz, 12" monitor (either colour or multi-level monochrome) because of their comparatively high line frequency, with all but the M20 mode using the 24 MHz system master crystal to drive the pixel clock either directly or (320×200 and 8×16 40-character only) divided in two (in comparison, contemporary IBM displays ran at 15.8 to 21.9 kHz with 14.3 to 16.3 MHz dot clocks).

Colour depth remained the standard fixed 4-colour CGA palettes in 320×200, and "monochrome" in all higher modes (any selectable RGB(I) foreground colour/one of 15 shades, with a fixed black background), but could be expanded to 4 or 8 colours/greyscales in all resolutions, and 16 in all but 512×256, with the addition of a graphics memory expansion board holding between 32 and 96 KB RAM (the resolution:colour relationship being unintuitive due to Motorola HD6845 CRTC bandwidth and addressing limitations - 16 colours in the 640-pixel modes effectively combined the standard and expansion memory spaces into a single 64-bit wide bank); the expansion card also had its own monitor port built in allowing native dual-monitor support.

CGA compatibility was necessarily limited to "RGB" modes, and "well behaved" software that only used the BIOS-preset modes and didn't attempt too much clever direct reprogramming of the CRTC registers (including setting of pseudo-text hack modes like 160×100 16 colours), as there was no composite video output available and although some basic register settings remained the same, others were necessarily very different because of the line doubling trickery (itself a type of CRTC hack) and altered scan rates, and Olivetti's protective "scrambler" chip that attempted to convert custom settings to the nearest safe equivalents could only go so far. In its turn, the machine's headline 640×400 graphics mode received a moderate level of support from software developers, mostly for "serious" applications such as Lotus 1-2-3 and Symphony (Earl Weaver Baseball is however an example of a game that can use it), and was for a time both supported and emulated (as well as extended to e.g. 752x410) by various "Super EGA"/"any mode on any monitor" cards such as the ATI EGA Wonder. These, as well as any other replacement video card, could be used in the 6300 so long as they were designed to work either specifically with the machine (for high speed 16-bit cards), or in an IBM PC compatible mode (necessarily 8-bit at 4.77 MHz). However, the original graphics card had to remain in place even if no longer in use, as it formed an essential part of the bridge connecting the expansion board to the motherboard, and although it featured DIP switch jumpers to select between MDA/Hercules, 40 and 80 column CGA, and expanded video options including its own (as per the IBM motherboard settings), there was no "disable" switch. Instead, the (socketed) Motorola HD6845 CRTC main controller chip had to be removed, and replaced with a simple but remarkably expensive bridging circuit (or a user installed set of jumper wires to the correct half-dozen socket terminals) to bypass the necessary bus signals through the card untouched.

Some plasma-screen and early LCD based portables from Compaq and other manufacturers also copied the M24/6300's graphics hardware to make better use of early square-pixel 640×400 panels popular for Japanese and other non-IBM portables (still well suited to the basic CGA/EGA resolutions, but not so much EGA-high or MDA/EGA text, and unable to show MCGA/VGA-high or Hercules graphics without cropping or losing details) in an IBM Compatible hardware ecosystem that otherwise avoided the mode. However, it remained on the whole a poorly supported oddity, much like IBM's own PGC and most Super EGAs outside of their limited library of applications with direct driver support, and PC graphics on the whole did not exceed 640×350 in 16 colours or 720×348 in monochrome until the arrival of both the VGA standard, and Windows 3.0 which provided a simple one-driver-for-all-programs framework for future expansion cards to build on.

=== Keyboard ===
Olivetti produced 2 official keyboards for the M24

- Keyboard 1 - ANK 2463 (With 83 keys)
- Keyboard 2 - ANK 2462 (With 92 keys)

The keyboard used a proprietary 9-pin D-sub connector built into the system board and had the unconventional option of plugging a mouse into the keyboard via another 9-pin D-sub connector. The mouse could be configured to simulate the usage of the keyboard's arrow keys in DOS applications without mouse support, aided by the choice of a parallel quadrature encoding design (as per the Microsoft Bus Mouse, Amiga, and Atari ST mice, all of which can be modified to work with the 6300) instead of the latterly more common 9-pin serial transmission.

== Reception ==
A January 1985 review in InfoWorld declared it "a fair performer, better than the 8088-equipped IBM PC and PC XT and about equal to the 8086-based Compaq Deskpro", and taking pricing into account concluded that it was "a good deal, but by no means perfect." The reviewer wondered how the "5 MHz" 8086 in the Compaq ran as fast as the same processor at 8 MHz in the AT&T machine; however, this appears to be a misunderstanding given that the Compaq was switchable between a guaranteed IBM PC-compatible 4.77 MHz and an enhanced-performance 7.16 MHz clock rate (respectively one-third and one-half of the same NTSC colourburst crystal used in the IBM, but not the Olivetti/AT&T), and defaulted to the latter on boot, as detailed in other publications of the time, and endlessly misreported (including as "8 MHz", about as frequently as the miscalculated "7.14 MHz") ever since. The reason behind the M24/6300's failure to perform any better than equal with the 1/9th-slower Deskpro may be traceable, as hinted at in the InfoWorld review, to poorly optimised graphics routines in the BIOS, which would have a particularly noticeable effect in the high resolution 640x400 and extended colour modes.

A November 1985 review in PC Magazine of the hard drive-equipped version found it on par with the (6 MHz, 80286 equipped) IBM PC AT as far as processor performance was concerned, but with considerably slower I/O.

The initial model of the AT&T 6300 (no hard disk and only 360K floppy) had slow sales in 1984 with only 28,500 sold compared to 1.5 million IBM PCs. The sales were not much better in the first three months of 1985, with only 8,500 sold in that time period. If fact, worldwide sales of the Olivetti M24 were only 42,000 in the first year, well below the planned production capacity of 200,000. As a result, AT&T introduced the faster models with hard drive and a math co-processor in March. Still, after about one year on the market, AT&T had only claimed about 1% of the PC market, on par with that of TeleVideo and Columbia Data Products, but well below that of Compaq and Kaypro. By December 1986 however, AT&T's PC line (including the 6300 Plus, described below) put it in the fourth place in terms of market share in the US.

Olivetti's M24 did much better in Europe, where it became the market leader in 1986. The company produced almost half a million M24 machines that year, about 200,000 of which went to the United States. As it claimed the crown of most PC machines sold in Europe that year, Olivetti also became the third largest PC manufacturer worldwide. Olivetti would however be unable to repeat the feat in the subsequent years, and so 1986 represents the company's apogee in terms of PC market share.

The 6300 was also supported by Unix-based operating systems particularly by Venix/86 Encore, released in September 1984, and by a version of Xenix adapted for the machine by the Santa Cruz Operation and announced in June 1985.

== Successors in Olivetti's product line ==
In response to IBM's launch of their PS/2 line, Olivetti revamped their product line in July 1987 to include 3.5" floppy drives (in 5.25-to-3.5" converted bays though) and also introduced new 80386-based products. The M24 (and M24 SP) were succeeded by the M240 (8086 at 10 MHz, which AT&T marketed in the USA as the 6300 WGS) while the M28 (and M28 SP) was succeeded by the M280 (80286 at 12 MHz). Olivetti also introduced an M380 series (both tower and desktop) using the 80386 processor.

== See also ==
- AT&T UNIX PC (7300)
- Computing for All, a French government plan to introduce computers to the country's pupils
- Olivetti M19
- Polaroid Palette
