= Olivetti M28 =

Olivetti personal computer released in 1983

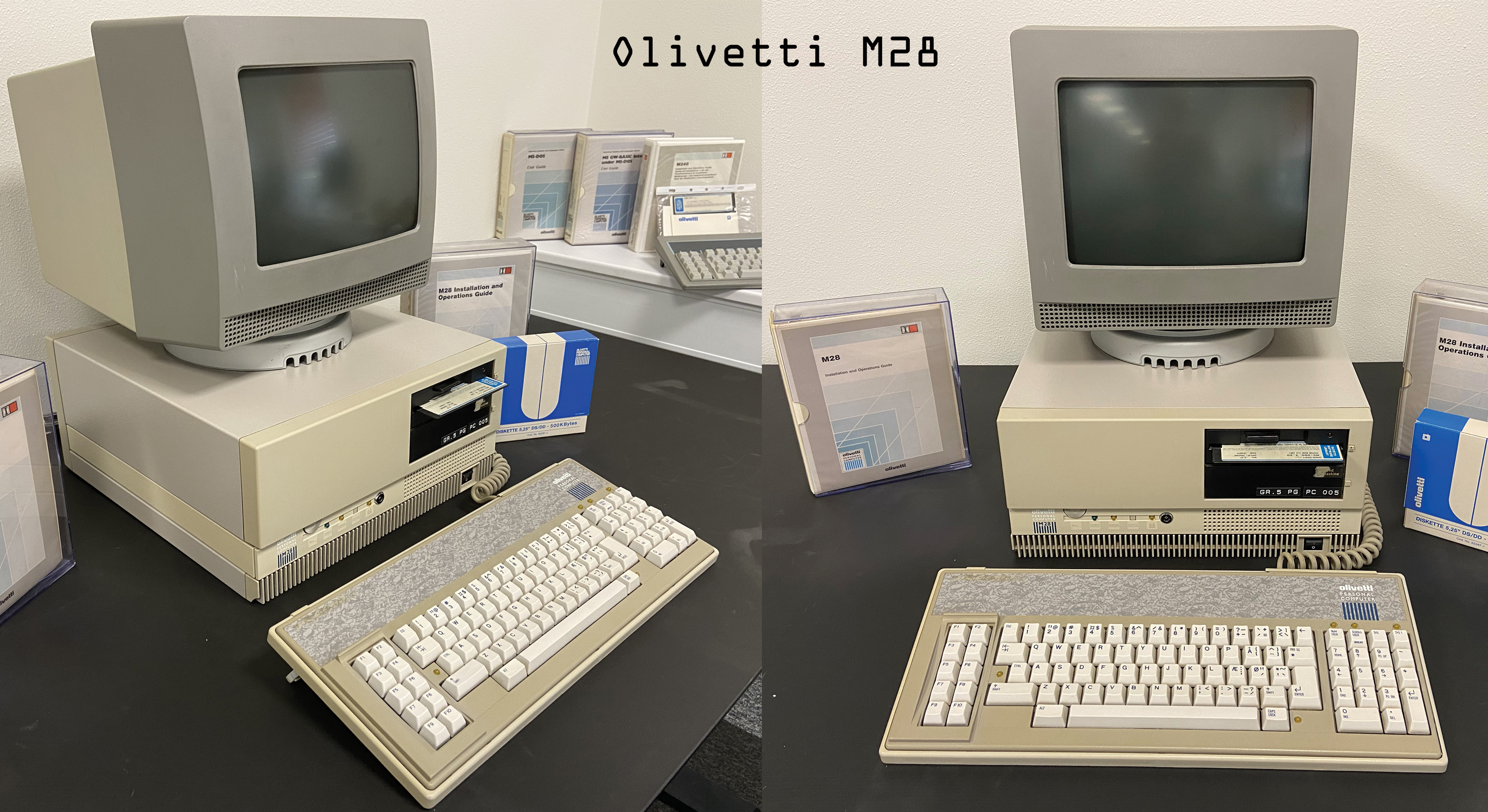
- Also known as: AT&T PC 6310, LogAbax Persona 1800
- Manufacturer: Olivetti
- Type: Personal computer
- Released: 1986; 40 years ago
- Operating system: MS-DOS 3.2, XENIX
- CPU: Intel 80286 @ 8 MHz
- Memory: 512 KB (expandable to 1024 KB on the motherboard)
- Storage: 20MB hard drive
- Removable storage: Floppy Drive
- Display: 12" monochrome or 14" color monitor; proprietary DB25 interface; 640x400, 640x200 monochrome; 320x200 in 4 colors; 80x25, 40x24 characters in 16 colors
- Sound: Internal Speaker
- Connectivity: Serial RS-232 port, Centronics parallel port
- Predecessor: Olivetti M24

The Olivetti M28 personal computer, introduced in 1986, was the successor to the Olivetti M24. It had an Intel 80286 CPU running at 8 MHz and 512 KB (expandable to 1024 KB on the motherboard) of RAM, featuring a 5.25" floppy drive and a 20 MB hard drive. The operating systems were MS-DOS 3.2 and XENIX.

The computer had room to install three disk units, as opposed to only two on the M24. It was possible to install a 70 MB hard drive, a 80287 math coprocessor and an enhanced CGA compatible graphic card capable of displaying 640 × 400 pixels monochrome. An additional graphics card, EGC2413 (also known as DEB, Display Enhancement Board) was available to extend the number of colors to 16, plus some other additional features as combined text plus 8 color graphics, dithering, blinking etc.

The Olivetti M28 was rebranded as the AT&T PC 6310 by AT&T in 1987 and sold on the US market.

It was available in France as the Persona 1800, sold by LogAbax.

== See also ==
- Olivetti M24
