= LogAbax =

French computer manufacturer

- Industry: IT company
- Founded: 1942
- Defunct: 1988
- Products: Computers

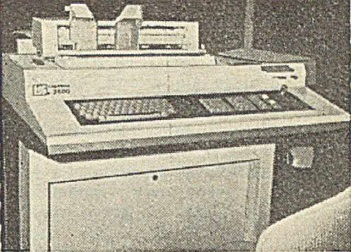
Logabax 2600

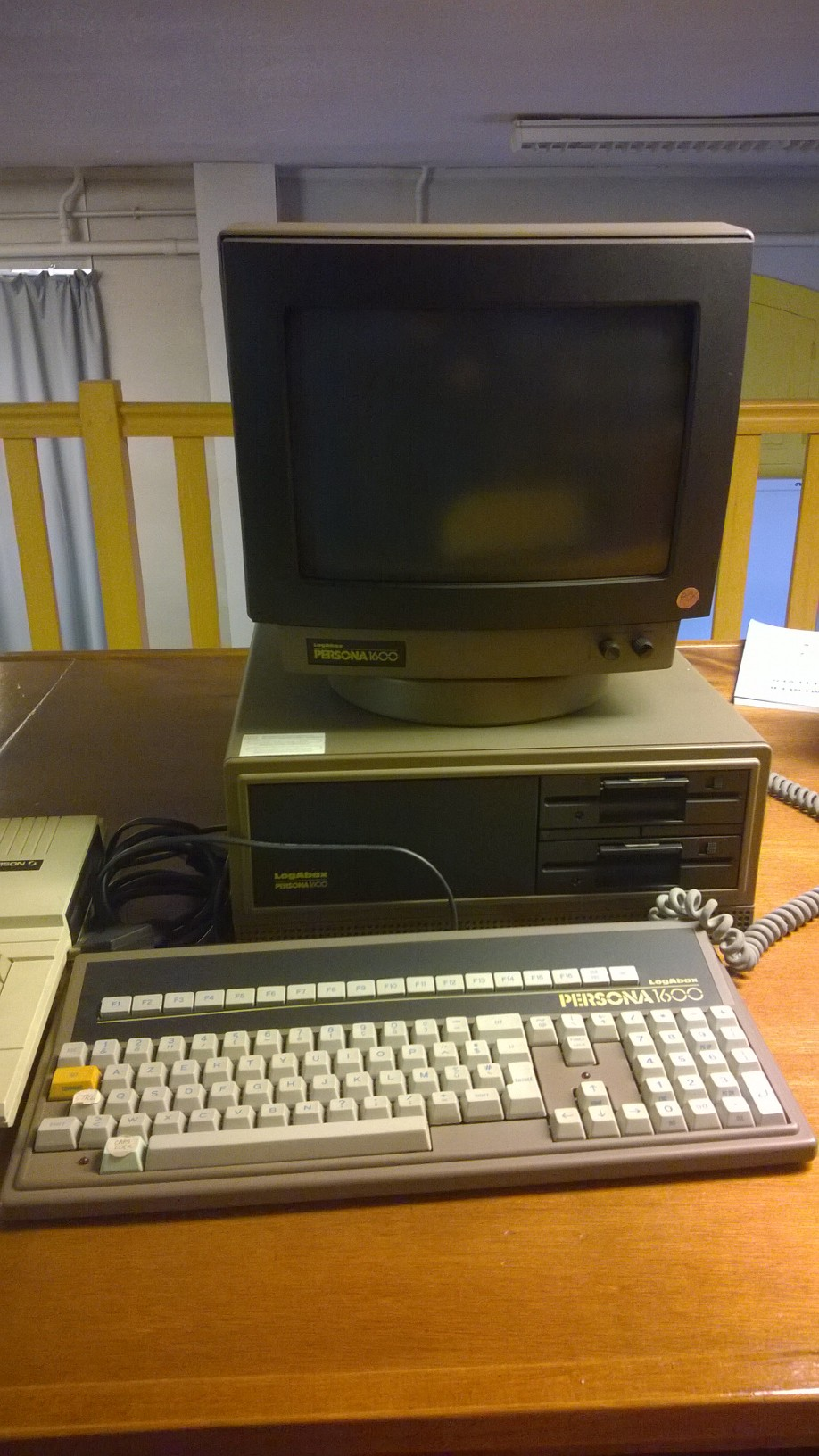
LogAbax Persona 1600

LogAbax was a French computer brand. Founded in 1942, the company was one of France's pioneers in computer manufacturing. The name is composed of two abbreviations: Log from logarithm and Abax from abacus.

== History ==
The company was created in 1942 as “La Société Française des Brevets LogAbax”. In 1947 it employs twenty people and has a factory located at Malakoff. The company obtains a contract from CNRS for the construction of a "Couffignal machine", intended to be the fist French "electronic calculation machine". Between 1948 and 1950 LogAbax studies an electronic meter, related to the electronic calculator development.

In 1968 LogAbax and Bariquand et Marre merge, forming LogAbax SA.

The LX 500, a personal computer based on the Z80 microprocessor and running the CP/M operating system, is presented in 1978.

Due to poor results in the late 1970s, LogAbax files for bankruptcy in 1981, with Olivetti becoming the majority shareholder, creating a new entity named Société Nouvelle LogAbax.

The Persona 1600, a PC compatible machine with an Intel 8086 CPU (similar to Olivetti M24) is presented in 1985. Other rebranded Olivetti PCs follow (Persona 1800 and 1300).

In 1988 Olivetti France and Société Nouvelle LogAbax merge, becoming Olivetti-LogAbax.

== Machines ==
- LX 3200 - office computer, calculator, typewriter, printer, 1969
- LX 2200, 2600 - office computer, calculator, typewriter, printer, 1974/75
- LX 4200, 4300, 4400, 4500, 4600 - office computer, 1970s/75
- LX 5000, 5076, 5200 - multi-user 16-bit computer, 64 Kb RAM, 1976/77
- LX 2000, 2010, 2500 - 1976
- LX 500, 518, 528 - Z80A, 128Kb RAM, CP/M, 1978
- LX 3000, 3128, 3500 - multi-user office computer, 1980
- Hyper 32 - fault tolerant redundant computer, 1983
- Persona 800 - Z80 @ 4 MHz, 64KB RAM, CP/M, 1985
- Persona 1600 (Olivetti M24) - Nanoréseau network machine, 8086 @ 8 MHz, 1985
- Persona 1800 (Olivetti M28) - 80286 @ 8 MHz, 1986
- Persona 1300 (Olivetti M19) - 8088 @ 4.77 MHz, 256KB RAM, 1986
- 3B modèle 400 (Olivetti CPS/32 Stratos) - 68030, VOS, 1986

== See also ==
- Computing for All, a French government plan to introduce computers to the country's pupils
