= Léanord =

French computer brand

- Industry: IT company
- Founded: 1960
- Defunct: 1989
- Products: Computers

Léanord (Laboratoire d'Electronique et d'Automatisme du Nord) was a French computer brand, founded in 1960 at Haubourdin, near Lille. It was a subsidiary of Creusot-Loire and started to develop computers in the late 1970s.

The first machines, called Picolog 8, Picolog 80 and Picodidac 80 were based on Intel 8008, 8080 and 8085 microprocessors and designed for automation and machine code learning.

Léanord's first microcomputer was the Silex, released in 1978. Based on a licensed Apple II motherboard with a MOS 6502 running at 1Mhz and 32Kb RAM, the machine was expensive for the time (costing 29,000 Francs) and came with SILBasic (a BASIC interpreter), SILPascal (a Pascal interpreter) and SILDOS (a disk operating system). It had an 8-inch floppy disc drive and came in a 54x35x59 cm box, that also included the keyboard and monitor.

In 1979 Léanord released the Sil'z, similar in appearance to the Silex but CP/M compatible. It was powered by a Zilog Z80 at 2.5 MHz, had 64 Kb of RAM, 80x24 character monochrome display, two 5'' 1/4 320Kb disc drives, two RS-232c ports (for printer and modem), and measured 54x33x57 cm.

It was followed by the Sil'z II in 1981 (adding a Western WD1795 controller for extra floppy disc drives) and Sil'z III in 1982. In 1983, the Sil'z IV was released, with a different design featuring a separate keyboard and monitor and adding a hard drive.

The Sil'z 16 was released in 1983 with relation to the Computing for All government program, featuring the Nanoréseau, a small network based on the RS422 standard, and developed in connection with Lille university. This machine came with a Intel 8088 CPU running at 4.77Mhz, 128 Kb of RAM, MS-DOS, CP/M-86 and Microsoft Basic.

Later machines were PC compatible. The Challenger Elan series, released in 1986, were 16-bit ISA backplane machines with 8086, 8088, 80286 and 80386 processors.

In 1989 Léanord merged with Intertechnique, being eventually absorbed by Siemens-Nixdorf.

== Models ==
- Picolog 8 - Intel 8008, 1977
- Picolog 80 - Intel 8080, 1977
- Picodidac 80 - Intel 8085, 1979
- Silex - Licensed Apple II motherboard, MOS 6502 @ 1Mhz, 32Kb RAM, 1978
- Sil’z - Zilog Z80 @ 2.5 MHz, 64 Kb RAM, CP/M, 1979–1980
- Sil’z II - Zilog Z80 @ 2.5 MHz, 64 Kb RAM, CP/M 2.2, 1981
- Sil’z III - Zilog Z80 @ 2.5 MHz, 64 Kb RAM, CP/M 2.2, 1982
- Sil’z IV - Zilog Z80 @ 2.5 MHz, 64 Kb RAM, CP/M, Separate keyboard and monitor, hard drive, 1983
- Sil’z 16 - Intel 8088 @ 4.77Mhz, 128 Kb RAM, MS-DOS, CP/M-86, Nanoréseau network machine, based on the ProtoPC from Future Computers, 1983
- Challenger Elan - First backplane PCs, 8086, 8088, 80286 and 80386, 1986

== See also ==
- Computing for All, a French government plan to introduce computers to the country's pupils
