= Polaroid Palette =

Series of digital film recorders

The Polaroid Palette and Polaroid ProPalette are a series of digital film recorders from Polaroid Corporation. The line started in the early 1980s, using 35mm film to produce slides for presentations. All versions of GEM provide drivers.

== Models ==
- Polaroid Palette
- Polaroid Palette Plus
- Polaroid HR-6000
- Polaroid ProPalette 7000
- Polaroid ProPalette 8000
- Polaroid Palette ColorTune

== See also ==
- Olivetti M24
