= SFENA =

Société française d'équipements pour la navigation aérienne or SFENA was a former French avionics company.

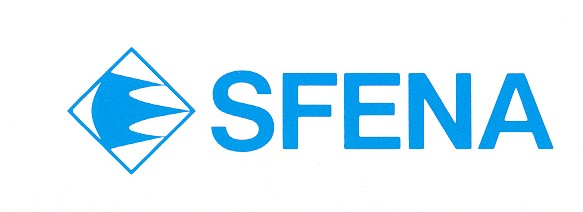
SFENA

== History ==
It was founded in 1947. It was disbanded in 1989. It made the flight control system (AFCS) for Concorde, as well as its artificial horizon and horizontal situation indicator (HSI), and automatic throttle system (ATS).

=== Ownership ===
It was merged with Crouzet in 1981, when Crouzet took its ownership from 35% to 85%.

== Structure ==
It was headquartered at Neuilly-sur-Seine in Hauts-de-Seine (Île-de-France region) until 1970 when it moved to Vélizy-Villacoublay in a technical research centre near Vélizy – Villacoublay Air Base.

Horizontal situation indicator

== Products ==
It made guidance systems for aircraft including:

- Artificial horizons (attitude indicators or ADI)
- Horizontal situation indicators (HSI)
- Autopilots
- Flight controls (AFCS)
- Sensors

== See also ==
- Smiths Industries, similar British company
